= List of airports in Nepal =

This is a list of airports in Nepal, sorted by location.

The oldest of the country's three international airports, and the hub of air services in the country, is Tribhuvan International Airport, which serves the nation's capital and the country's largest metropolitan city of Kathmandu. Gautam Buddha International Airport, situated at the birth-place of Gautam Buddha (i.e. Lumbini), is the second international airport to operate in Nepal. Pokhara International Airport, located at the heart of tourism in Pokhara city, is the third international airport to operate in Nepal.

As of 2025, CAAN Nepal has a total of 55 airports: 3 international, 2 regional hub airports, 29 normal domestic airports, and 21 airports that are Not In Operation.

== International airports ==
Airport name	City served	Province	ICAO	IATA	Usage	Runway(s)	Coordinates	Total passengers
Tribhuvan International Airport	Kathmandu	Bagmati	VNKT	KTM	Public/military	3,350 m (10,990 ft)	27°41′47″N 085°21′32″E	9,482,788 (2024)
Pokhara International Airport	Pokhara	Gandaki	VNPR	PHH	Public	2,500 m (8,200 ft)	28°11′22.9″N 84°00′53.6″E	1,016,900 (2024)
Gautam Buddha International Airport	Siddharthanagar	Lumbini	VNBW	BWA	Public	3,000 m (9,800 ft)	27°30′20″N 083°24′58″E	619,639 (2024)

== Domestic Airports ==
Airport name	City served	Location		IATA	ICAO	Runway(s)	Coordinates	Remarks
Airport name	City served	Province	District	IATA	ICAO	Runway(s)	Coordinates	Remarks
Regional Hub Airports
Biratnagar Airport	Biratnagar	Koshi	Morang	VNVT	BIR	1,775 m (5,823 ft)	26°28′53″N 087°15′50″E	
Nepalgunj Airport	Nepalgunj	Lumbini	Banke	VNNG	KEP	1,700 m (5,600 ft)	28°06′13″N 081°40′01″E	
In operation Airports
Bajhang Airport	Jaya Prithvi	Sudurpaschim	Bajhang	VNBG	BJH	654 m (2,146 ft)	29°32′18″N 081°11′02″E	
Bajura Airport	Bajura	Sudurpaschim	Bajura	VNBR	BJU	520 m (1,710 ft)	29°30′10″N 081°40′10″E	
Bharatpur Airport	Bharatpur	Bagmati	Chitwan	VNBP	BHR	1,158 m (3,799 ft)	27°40′41″N 084°25′46″E	
Bhojpur Airport	Bhojpur	Koshi	Bhojpur	VNBJ	BHP	533 m (1,749 ft)	27°08′51″N 087°03′03″E	
Chandragadhi Airport	Bhadrapur	Koshi	Jhapa	VNCG	BDP	1,500 m (4,900 ft)	26°34′14″N 088°04′45″E	
Dang Airport	Tulsipur	Lumbini	Dang	VNDG	DNP	832 m (2,730 ft)	28°06′40″N 082°17′39″E	
Dhangadhi Airport	Dhangadhi	Sudurpaschim	Kailali	VNDH	DHI	1,800 m (5,900 ft)	28°45′12″N 080°34′55″E	
Dolpa (Juphal) Airport	Juphal	Karnali	Dolpa	VNDP	DOP	663 m (2,175 ft)	28°59′09″N 082°49′09″E	
Falgunanda Sukilumba Airport	Ilam	Koshi	Ilam	VNFN	N/A	670 m (2,200 ft)	26°52′39″N 87°54′18″E	
Gulmi Resunga Airport	Resunga	Lumbini	Gulmi	VNRG	—N/a	560 m (1,840 ft)	28°01′30″N 83°15′14″E	
Janakpur Airport	Janakpur	Madhesh	Dhanusha	VNJP	JKR	1,005 m (3,297 ft)	26°42′31″N 085°55′20″E	
Jomsom Airport	Jomsom	Gandaki	Mustang	VNJS	JMO	739 m (2,425 ft)	28°46′47″N 083°43′21″E	
Jumla Airport	Chandannath	Karnali	Jumla	VNJL	JUM	670 m (2,200 ft)	29°16′26″N 082°11′23″E	
Khanidanda Airport	Khanidanda, Khotang	Koshi	Khotang	VNKD	N/A	520 m (1,710 ft)	27°10′52″N 086°46′19″E	
Phaplu Airport	Solu Dudhkunda	Koshi	Solukhumbu	VNPL	PPL	671 m (2,201 ft)	27°31′05″N 086°35′04″E	
Pokhara Airport	Pokhara	Gandaki	Kaski	VNPK	PKR	1,438 m (4,718 ft)	28°12′03″N 083°58′55″E	
Rajbiraj Airport	Rajbiraj	Madhesh	Saptari	VNRB	RJB	1,500 m (4,900 ft)	26°30′30″N 086°44′15″E	
Ramechhap Airport	Manthali	Bagmati	Ramechhap	VNRC	RHP	530 m (1,740 ft)	27°23′38″N 086°03′41″E	
Rara Airport	Rara National Park	Karnali	Mugu	VNRR	N/A	570 m (1,870 ft)	29°31′18″N 082°08′49″E	
Rumjatar Airport	Rumjatar	Koshi	Okhaldhunga	VNRT	RUM	585 m (1,919 ft)	27°18′12.1″N 086°33′2.5″E	
Salle Rukum Airport	Musikot	Karnali	Western Rukum	VNSL	RUK	580 m (1,900 ft)	28°38′15″N 082°26′59″E	
Sanfebagar Airport	Sanfebagar	Sudurpaschim	Accham	VNSR	FEB	530 m (1,740 ft)	29°14′14″N 081°12′55″E	
Simara Airport	Jitpur Simara	Madhesh	Bara	VNSI	SIF	1,192 m (3,911 ft)	27°09′34″N 084°58′48″E	
Simikot Airport	Simikot	Karnali	Humla	VNST	IMK	549 m (1,801 ft)	29°58′16″N 081°49′08″E	
Surkhet Airport	Birendranagar	Karnali	Surkhet	VNSK	SKH	1,255 m (4,117 ft)	28°35′09″N 081°38′07″E	
Taplejung Airport	Taplejung	Koshi	Taplejung	VNTJ	TPJ	700 m (2,300 ft)	27°21′04″N 087°41′44″E	
Tenzing-Hillary (Lukla) Airport	Lukla	Koshi	Solukhumbu	VNLK	LUA	527 m (1,729 ft)	27°41′16″N 086°43′53″E	
Thamkharka Airport	Khotehang	Koshi	Khotang	VNTH	N/A	630 m (2,070 ft)	27°02′47″N 086°51′29″E	
Tumlingtar Airport	Tumlingtar	Koshi	Sankhuwasabha	VNTR	TMI	1,200 m (3,900 ft)	27°18′54″N 087°11′36″E	
Not in operation Airports
Baglung Airport	Baglung	Gandaki	Baglung	VNBL	BGL	608 m (1,995 ft)	28°12′46.6″N 83°39′56.7″E	
Baitadi Airport	Patan, Baitadi	Sudurpaschim	Baitadi	VNBT	BIT	544 m (1,785 ft)	29°27′52.5″N 080°33′0.71″E	
Chaurjahari Rukum Airport	Chaurjahari	Karnali	Rukum	VNCJ	RUK	600 m (2,000 ft)	28°37′40.3″N 82°11′39.3″E	
Darchula Airport	Gokuleshwor	Sudurpashchim	Darchula	VNDL	DAP	—N/a	29°40′07.9″N 80°32′54″E	Earthen Runway
Dhorpatan Airport	Dhorpatan	Gandaki	Baglung	VNDR	—N/a	—N/a	28°29′30.8″N 83°03′05.9″E	Earthen Runway
Doti Airport	Dipayal Silgadhi	Sudurpashchim	Doti	VNDT	SIH	490 m (1,610 ft)	29°15′45.2″N 80°56′11.2″E	
Gorkha Palungtar Airport	Palungtar	Gandaki	Gorkha	VNGK	GKH	1,067 m (3,501 ft)	28°02′18.2″N 84°27′58.7″E	Earthen Runway
Jiri Airport	Jiri	Bagmati	Dolakha	VNJI	JIR	400 m (1,300 ft)	27°37′34.2″N 86°13′50.5″E	Earthen Runway
Kalikot Airport	Narharinath	Karnali	Kalikot	—N/a	—N/a	640 m (2,100 ft)	29°10′18.2″N 81°34′35.5″E	
Kamal Bazaar Airport	Kamalbazar	Sudurpashchim	Achham	—N/a	—N/a	978 m (3,209 ft)	29°3′11.94″N 81°20′34.37″E	Earthen Runway
Kangeldanda Airport	Kangeldanda	Koshi	Solukhumbu	VNKL	—N/a	580 m (1,900 ft)	27°24′38″N 86°38′47.8″E	Earthen Runway
Khiji Chandeshwari Airport	Khiji Chandeshwari	Koshi	Okhaldhunga	—N/a	—N/a	580 m (1,900 ft)	27°27′17.5″N 86°18′34.8″E	Earthen Runway
Langtang Airport	Langtang	Bagmati	Rasuwa	VNLT	LTG	—N/a	28°12′40.5″N 85°34′05.0″E	Earthen Runway
Lamidanda Airport	Lamidanda	Koshi	Khotang	VNLD	LDN	518 m (1,699 ft)	27°15′09.9″N 86°40′16.4″E	
Mahendranagar Airport	Mahendranagar	Sudurpashchim	Kanchanpur	VNMN	XMG	884 m (2,900 ft)	28°57′48″N 80°08′53″E	
Manang Airport	Manang	Gandaki	Manang	VNMA	NGX	650 m (2,130 ft)	28°38′28.03″N 84°05′16.94″E	
Masinechaur (Dolpa) Airport	Pahada	Karnali	Dolpa	VNMC	—N/a	600 m (2,000 ft)	29°03′33.4″N 82°44′39.8″E	
Meghauli Airport	Bharatpur	Bagmati	Chitwan	VNMG	MEY	1,085 m (3,560 ft)	27°34′35.3″N 84°13′42.2″E	Earthen Runway
Rolpa Airport	Rolpa	Lumbini	Rolpa	VNRP	RPA	—N/a	28°16′01.6″N 82°45′21.9″E	Earthen Runway
Syangboche Airport	Syangboche	Koshi	Solukhumbu	VNSB	SYH	405 m (1,329 ft)	27°48′39.9″N 86°42′45″E	Earthen Runway
Tikapur Airport	Tikapur	Sudurpashchim	Kailali	VNTP	TPU	573 m (1,880 ft)	28°31′19.2″N 081°07′21.6″E	

== Proposed airports ==
Airport name	City served	District	Province	Type	Coordinates	Status
Nijgadh International Airport	Nijgadh	Bara	Madhesh	International	27°07′26.1″N 85°10′26.2″E	
Sagarmatha Airport	Triyuga	Udayapur	Koshi	Domestic	26°45′41.62″N 86°45′10.79″E	
Argha Bhagwati Airport	Sandhikharka	Arghakhanchi	Lumbini	Domestic	27°59′30″N 83°07′02.5″E	Construction halted

== Heliport ==
City served	Heliport name	Location		IATA	ICAO	Capacity	Coordinates
City served	Heliport name	City	District	IATA	ICAO	Capacity	Coordinates
Kathmandu Valley	Nalinchowk Heliport	Suryabinayak	Bhaktapur	—N/a	—N/a	10	27°39′0.45″N 85°27′54.39″E

== See also ==
- List of the busiest airports in Nepal
- Transport in Nepal
- List of airports by ICAO code: V#VN - Nepal
- Wikipedia:WikiProject Aviation/Airline destination lists: Asia#Nepal
- regional aviation chart (1984)
