= List of the busiest airports in Nepal =

The list of the busiest airports in Nepal is a ranking of the country's air transport hubs based on annual passenger traffic, aircraft movements, and cargo tonnage. As a landlocked country with a predominantly mountainous terrain, aviation plays a vital role in Nepal's national infrastructure, providing essential connectivity to remote regions inaccessible by road and serving as the primary gateway for international tourism and labor migration. The Civil Aviation Authority of Nepal (CAAN) oversees the operation of 55 airports nationwide, of which approximately 34 are currently operational as of 2025.

Historically, the aviation sector has been heavily centralized around Tribhuvan International Airport in Kathmandu, which remains the country's primary international gateway and busiest domestic hub. In 2024, TIA recorded a record-breaking 9.5 million passengers, operating significantly above its designed annual capacity of 8 million. This congestion has prompted the government to decentralize air traffic through the inauguration of two new international facilities: Gautam Buddha International Airport in Bhairahawa and Pokhara International Airport. While these new hubs have seen a steady rise in domestic traffic, surpassing 1 million annual passengers in Pokhara by 2024, they continue to work toward full international utilization to alleviate the pressure on the capital.

The domestic market is categorized into "trunk routes", connecting major cities in the Terai and mid-hills and "STOL" (Short Take-Off and Landing) routes that serve high-altitude Himalayan airstrips. Airports such as Biratnagar, Nepalgunj, and Bhadrapur consistently rank among the busiest for domestic movements due to their roles as regional economic centers. Conversely, Tenzing-Hillary Airport in Lukla remains one of the busiest and most famous STOL airports in the world, serving as the critical entry point for the Everest trekking region.

== Statistics ==
=== 2020-2024 data ===
The following is a list of 12 largest airports in Nepal by total passenger traffic in 2024, from CAAN statistics.

Rank (2024)	Airport	IATA code	City	Total Passengers				
Rank (2024)	Airport	IATA code	City	2024	2023	2022	2021	2020
1	Tribhuvan International Airport	KTM	Kathmandu	9,482,788	8,654,456	7,136,690	5,033,871	2,511,635
2	Pokhara International Airport	PHH	Pokhara	1,016,900	902,999	848,140	529,944	256,357
3	Biratnagar Airport	BIR	Biratnagar	659,889	671,144	764,208	643,869	296,059
4	Gautam Buddha International Airport	BWA	Siddharthanagar	619,639	551,639	585,730	558,739	181,703
5	Nepalgunj Airport	KEP	Nepalgunj	499,762	473,534	566,700	501,315	223,659
6	Bhadrapur Airport	BDP	Bhadrapur	372,555	342,229	390,074	326,518	131,905
7	Janakpur Airport	JKR	Janakpur	295,923	268,071	346,350	293,326	100,470
8	Dhangadhi Airport	DHI	Dhangadhi	285,121	350,123	318,123	260,046	145,312
9	Simara Airport	SIF	Jitpursimara	273,538	263,816	309,745	311,471	73,020
10	Bharatpur Airport	BHR	Bharatpur	234,566	227,807	246,964	202,969	80,387
11	Tenzing-Hillary Airport	LUA	Lukla	204,114	262,118	195,479	228,967	21,309
12	Surkhet Airport	SKH	Birendranagar	159,037	87,442	39,397	29,093	18,408

=== 2015-19 data ===
The largest airports in Nepal as of 2019 are shown in table below.

Rank (2019)	Airport	IATA code	Total Passengers				
Rank (2019)	Airport	IATA code	2019	2018	2017	2016	2015
1	Tribhuvan International Airport	KTM	7,327,042	7,190,238	6,339,235	5,268,338	4,581,210
2	Pokhara Airport	PKR	720,714	609,975	446,024	328,031	274,550
3	Biratnagar Airport	BIR	596,453	537,780	455,284	377,077	340,202
4	Nepalgunj Airport	KEP	453,433	426,661	369,355	233,533	176,372
5	Gautam Buddha Airport	BWA	388,378	377,692	300,393	168,421	107,914
6	Bhadrapur Airport	BDP	281,000	228,128	192,584	162,153	164,891
7	Bharatpur Airport	BHR	170,734	229,495	257,709	150,345	54,238
8	Dhangadhi Airport	DHI	150,295	177,698	128,035	62,375	45,469
9	Simikot Airport	IMK	138,104	54,261	59,770	57,207	21,922
10	Janakpur Airport	JKR	136,678	79,296	64,703	53,283	44,655
11	Simara Airport	SIF	134,573	231,291	107,154	78,756	45,525
12	Tenzing-Hillary Airport	LUA	129,508	124,929	146,879	119,801	81,174
