= Biratnagar Airport =

Biratnagar Airport विराटनगर विमानस्थल
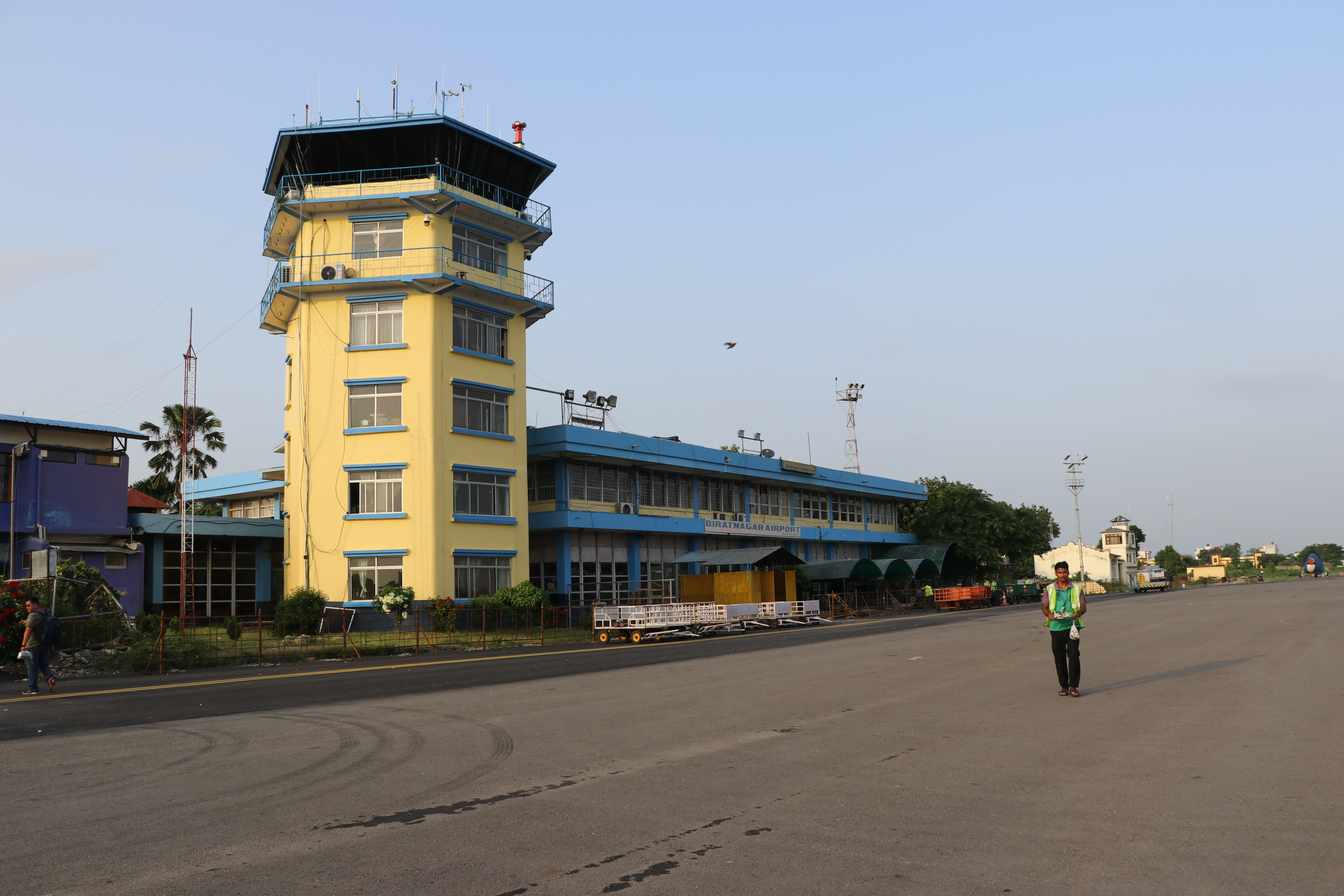
- Current terminal
- IATA: BIR; ICAO: VNVT

Summary
- Airport type: Public
- Owner: Government of Nepal
- Operator: Civil Aviation Authority of Nepal
- Serves: Biratnagar, Nepal
- Focus city for: Buddha Air; Shree Airlines; Saurya Airlines; Yeti airlines
- Elevation AMSL: 236 ft (72 m)
- Coordinates: 26°28′53″N 87°15′50″E
- Website: biratnagar.caanepal.gov.np

Map
- Location of airport in Nepal

Runways
Direction	Length		Surface
Direction	m	ft	Surface
09/27	1,775	5,823	Asphalt
- Source: DAFIF

Biratnagar Airport (Nepali: विराटनगर विमानस्थल, IATA: BIR, ICAO: VNVT) is a domestic airport located in Biratnagar serving Morang District, Koshi Province, Nepal. Biratnagar Airport is the third busiest airport in Nepal after Kathmandu and Pokhara. There are plans to upgrade the airport to serve international flights very soon.

== History ==
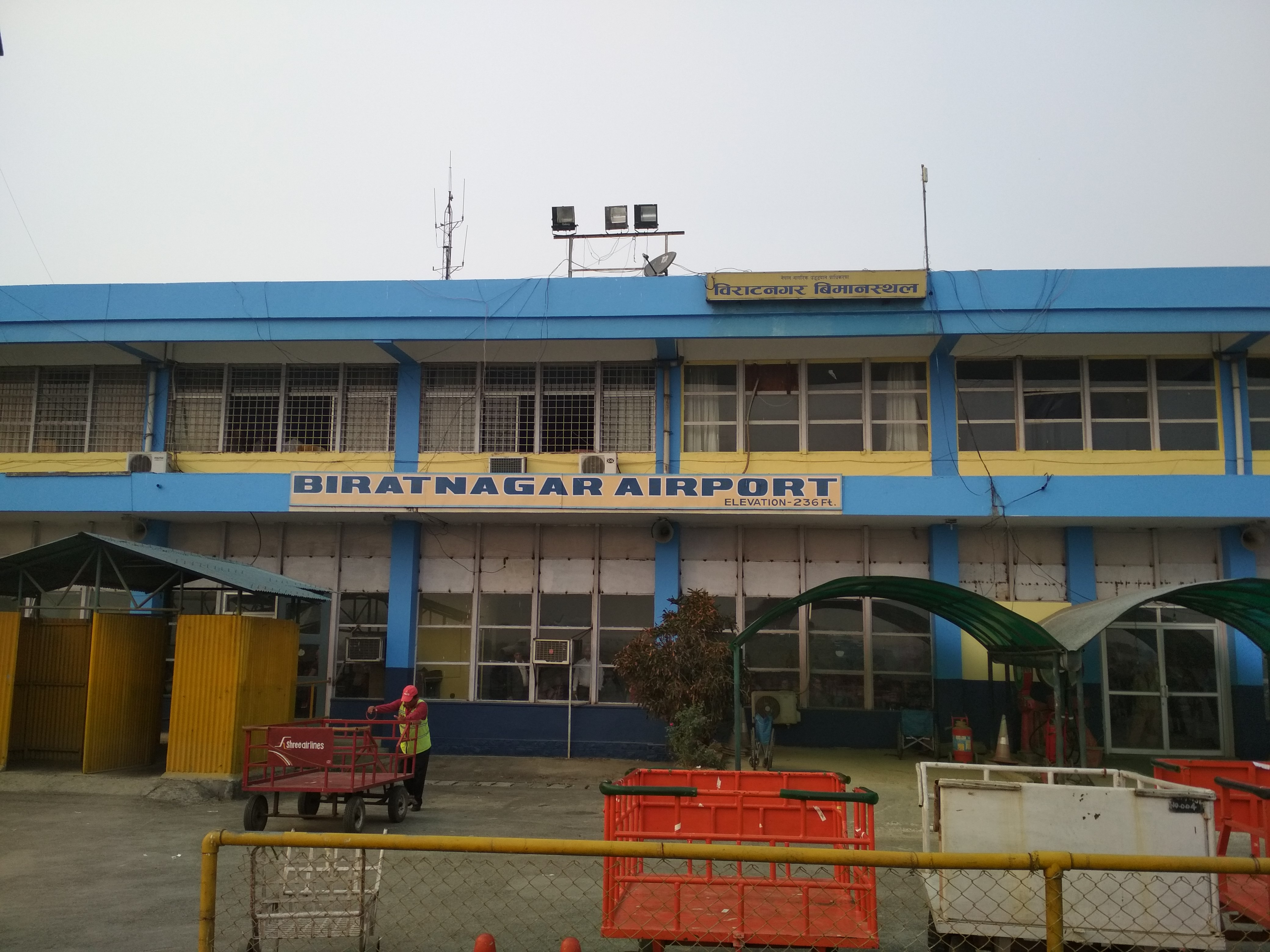
Terminal

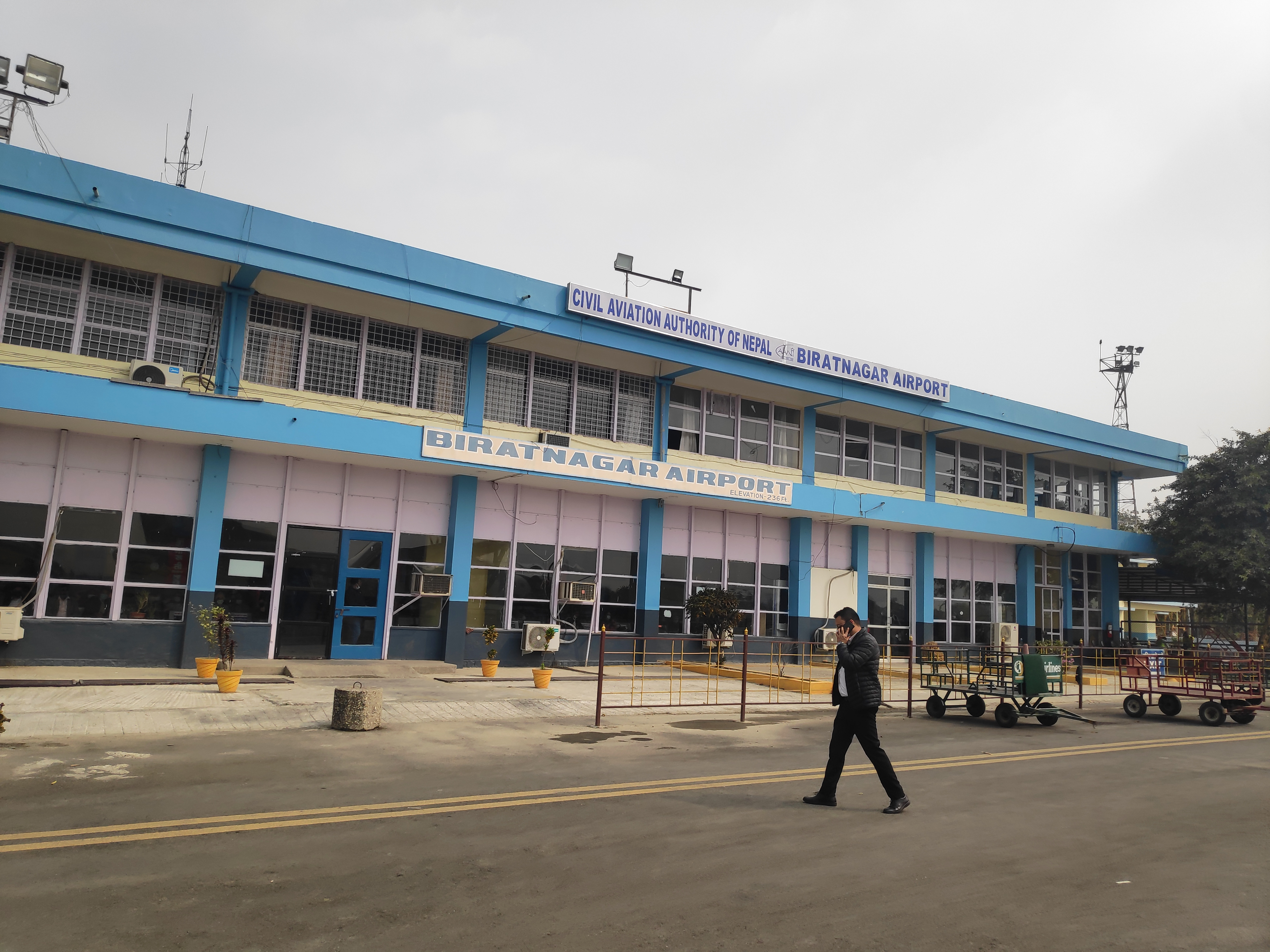
Civil Aviation Authority of Nepal - Biratnagar Airport

Biratnagar Airport commenced operations on 6 July 1958.

On 15 August 2017, during the August 2017 Nepal and India floods the runway of Biratnagar Airport was flooded, along with other parts of India and Nepal, and the airport was forced to suspend its operations.

In 2019, the Civil Aviation Authority of Nepal decided to upgrade the Biratnagar Airport to an international level, which includes lengthening the runway. In 2022, locals demonstrated, as they still were not compensated for the land that the Government was purchasing to expand the airport area.

== Facilities ==
=== Runway ===
The airport is located at an elevation of 236 feet (72 m) above mean sea level. It has one runway designated 09/27 with an asphalt surface measuring 1,775 by 30 metres (5,823 ft × 98 ft).This Airport is equipped for night operations and all-weather serviceability, supported by a Simple Approach Lighting System (SALS) on Runway 09, runway edge lighting, and Precision Approach Path Indicator (PAPI) lights.

The runway surface of made up of asphalt. The runway is also not grooved so the operation remain critical during rain for heavy mid-sized aircraft during landings.

=== Aids to landing and navigation ===
For navigation and landing guidance, the aerodrome utilizes a Doppler Very High Frequency Omnidirectional Range (DVOR) collocated with Distance Measuring Equipment (DME) and a Non-Directional Beacon (NDB). Additionally, the airport has implemented satellite-based Performance-based Navigation (PBN), including RNP-AR (Required Navigation Performance) approach procedures.

=== Ground Facilities ===
Ground facilities include a dedicated aviation fuel depot operated by the Nepal Oil Corporation, a passenger terminal recently upgraded to handle increased traffic, and a Category V Rescue and Fire Fighting (RFF) service. The apron provides parking capacity for up to four ATR-72 sized aircraft and additional smaller regional planes.

== Airlines and destinations ==
Airlines	Destinations
Buddha Air	Kathmandu, Pokhara–International, Tumlingtar
Saurya Airlines	Kathmandu, Siddharthanagar
Shree Airlines	Kathmandu
Yeti Airlines	Kathmandu

== Accidents and incidents ==
- 10 June 1973(2030 jestha 28) – 1973 Nepal plane hijack: A Royal Nepal Airlines flight from Biratnagar to Kathmandu, operated by a de Havilland Canada DHC-6 Twin Otter (9N-ABB), was taken over by three hijackers of the Nepali Congress party who demanded money and escaped after landing in Bihar, India. None of the three crew and 18 passengers were injured.
- 18 November 1981, a Pilatus PC-6 (Porter & Turbo Porter) of Royal Nepal Airlines cashed after initial climb after it lost height. The fatalities included 1 crew and 9 passengers.
- In October 2021, the airport closed for four days due to flooding of runway by torrential rainfall.

== See also ==
- List of airports in Nepal
