= Sagarmatha Airport =

- IATA: none; ICAO: none

Summary
- Airport type: Public
- Owner: Government Of Nepal
- Operator: Civil Aviation Authority of Nepal (CAAN)
- Coordinates: 26.761563°N 86.753000°E

Map
- Location within Nepal Sagarmatha Airport (Nepal)

Sagarmatha Airport is an airport under construction in Koshi Province of Nepal. The proposal is to build an airport in Jogidaha, Gaighat in Udayapur District. The proposed airport was scheduled to be completed within three years and set to open in December 2022. The runway is planned to be 60m x 2000 m.

== Development ==
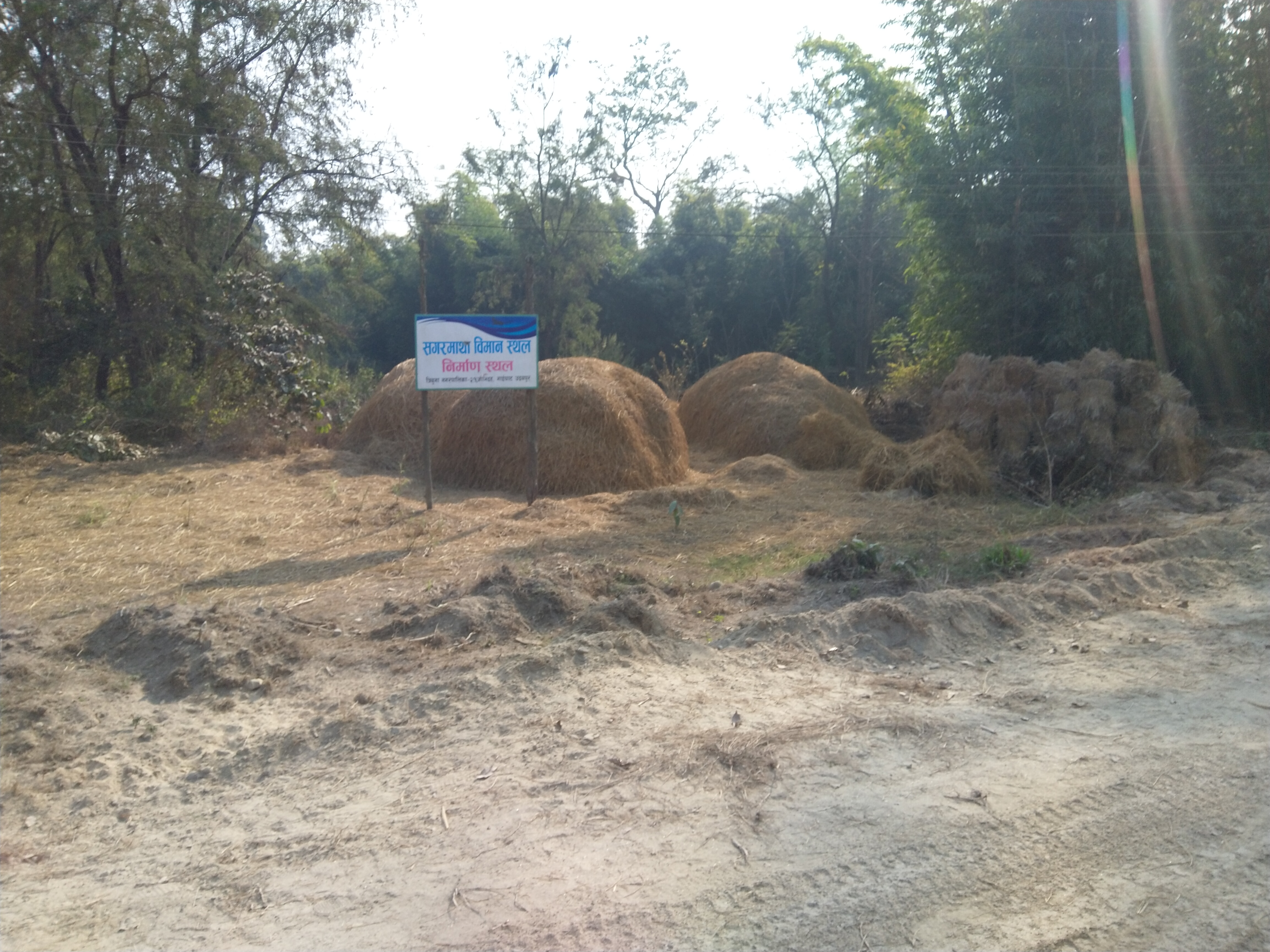
A signboard at Sagarmatha Airport construction area written in Nepali: Sagarmatha Airport construction area

- The concept of constructing an airport in Udayapur District was first developed in 1974, however was not developed on until 2019.
- A total of Rs 50 million has been allocated for the construction of the proposed airport.
- 13,687 trees have been cut down from the community forest at the location of the planned airport.156 hectares of area is cleared for further development.
- No budget allocated for the fiscal year 2024 to construct the airport though Member of Parliament of Udayapur 1 (constituency) Dr. Narayan Khadka has promised to avail 10 Million Rupees from the Infrastructure Development Committee to develop the construction area e.g. Fencing, uprooting, Soil compaction and Levelling.
- Investigations by The Kathmandu Post and its sister publication Kantipur (daily) reported that over 150 hectares of forest were cleared for the proposed Sagarmatha Airport, yet the project has remained abandoned for four years with no construction progress. The reports documented irregularities in the handling and sale of felled timber and raised concerns about mismanagement and politically driven decisions. The cleared land, left unused, has since turned into open grassland and faces increasing risk of encroachment.

== See also ==
- List of airports in Nepal

== Further ==
- Udayapur revives airport plan
- Constructing Sagarmatha Airport (in Nepali)
