= Sukilumba Airport =

Sukilumba Airport सुकिलुम्वा विमानस्थल
- IATA: —; ICAO: VNFN

Summary
- Airport type: Public
- Owner: Government of Nepal
- Operator: Civil Aviation Authority of Nepal
- Serves: Ilam Municipality, Nepal
- Coordinates: 26°52′39.0786″N 87°54′18.5538″E

Map
- Location of airport in Nepal

Runways
Direction	Length		Surface
Direction	m	ft	Surface
08/26	670	2,198	Asphalt

Sukilumba Airport (IATA: —, ICAO: VNFN), also known as Ilam Airport, is a domestic airport located in Ilam serving Ilam District, a district in Koshi Province in Nepal. Flight time from Kathmandu to Sukilumba Airport is about one hour.

== History ==
According to The Rising Nepal, constructions on the airport first began in 2011. In February 2015, construction ground to a halt as the project ran out of funds. In 2018, the first test flight landed at the airport. However, due to insufficient funds, the further construction of the airport was delayed. In 2021, Civil Aviation Authority of Nepal deemed the airport to be ready for operation. At the time of opening, the airport is served without a terminal building. Another test flight by Nepal Airlines was carried out on 9 February 2022. The airport was opened on 13 February 2022 with flights by Tara Air, whereas Nepal Airlines planned to operate flights but these plans did not yet materialize.

== Facilities ==
The airport resides at an elevation of 1,893 feet (577 m) above mean sea level. It has one runway which is 670 metres (2,198 ft) in length.

== Airlines and destinations ==
Airlines	Destinations
Tara Air	Kathmandu
Nepal Airlines	Kathmandu

== See also ==
- List of airports in Nepal
