= Buddha Air =

Nepalese airline

Buddha Air बुद्ध एयर

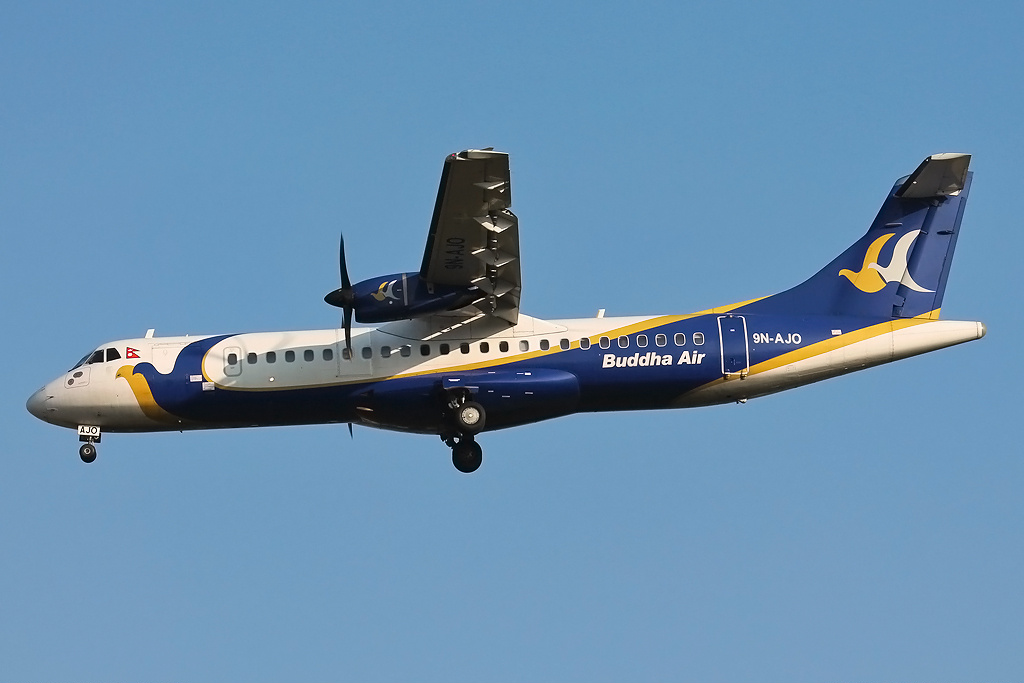
- Buddha Air ATR 72
IATA	ICAO	Call sign
U4	BHA	BUDDHA AIR
- Founded: 1996; 30 years ago
- Commenced operations: 11 October 1997; 29 years ago
- AOC #: 014/1996
- Hubs: Tribhuvan International Airport
- Secondary hubs: Pokhara International Airport
- Frequent-flyer program: Royal Club
- Subsidiaries: Buddha Holidays
- Fleet size: 17
- Destinations: 14
- Headquarters: Jawalakhel, Lalitpur, Nepal
- Key people: Late Surendra Bahadur Basnet (founder chairman); Birendra Bahadur Basnet (chairperson); Astha Basnet Thapa (executive director)
- Employees: 1600+
- Website: www.buddhaair.com

Buddha Air Pvt. Ltd (Nepali: बुद्ध एयर) is an airline based in Lalitpur, Nepal. It operates domestic flights within Nepal as well as international services to Varanasi and Kolkata in India, from its main base in Tribhuvan International Airport, Kathmandu. It was the largest domestic carrier in terms of passengers carried in 2023.

== History ==
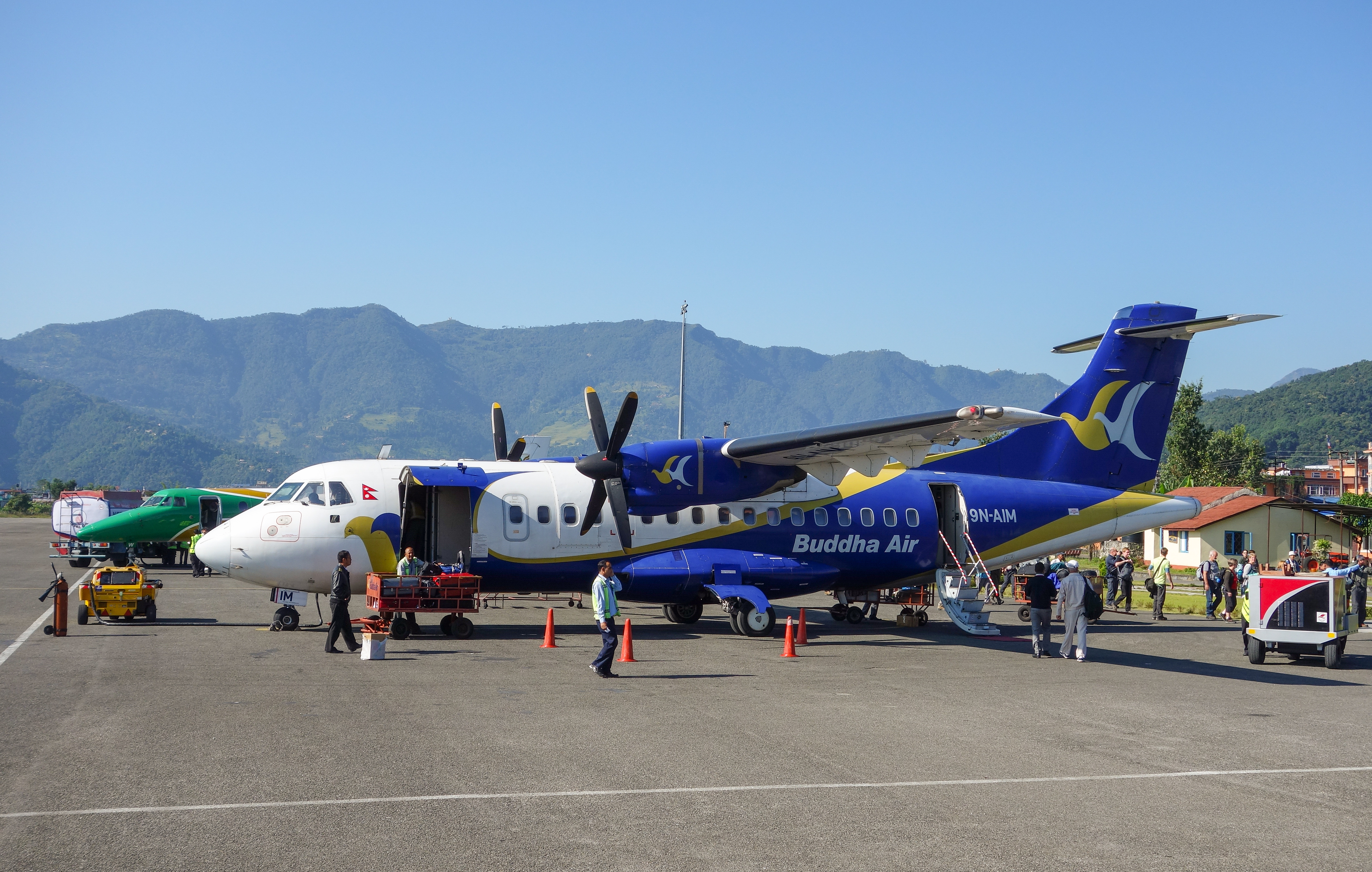
A Buddha Air ATR 42–300 at Pokhara Airport

The airline was established on 23 April 1996 as a private limited company by Surendra Bahadur Basnet, a retired Supreme Court judge and former government minister; and his son, Birendra Bahadur Basnet. The name of the airline is derived from the Sanskrit word Buddha, a title used for the much revered Siddhartha Gautama. Operations commenced on 11 October 1997 with a sightseeing flight to Mount Everest using a brand new Beechcraft 1900D. In 2001, the airline partnered with the Bhutanese flag carrier Drukair to charter flights during the peak tourist season. Within ten years, the company had expanded to a fleet of seven 1900Ds. In 2008, a loan from the International Finance Corporation allowed the company to expand further by purchasing two ATR 42 aircraft. Buddha Air took delivery of its first 72-seat ATR 72 in June 2010. In July 2026, the airline acquired 70 seater ATR 72-600, the first of its kind in Nepal.

== International operations ==
Buddha Air became the first international airline to operate charter flights to Paro Airport in Bhutan in August 2010.

In 2011, Buddha Air began international flights from Pokhara Airport to Chaudhary Charan Singh International Airport in Lucknow, India; however, these flights were discontinued soon after.

Kolkata – Buddha Air first launched the Kathmandu–Kolkata route on 27 May 2019, operating three weekly flights between Tribhuvan International Airport and Netaji Subhas Chandra Bose International Airport in Kolkata with a flight duration of about 1 hour 30 minutes. The service was later suspended in December 2019 amid low demand and the impact of the COVID-19 pandemic.

The airline resumed direct flights to Kolkata on 19 October 2025 after a six-year gap, initially operating three weekly return services (Sundays, Tuesdays and Thursdays) with ATR-72 turboprop aircraft. The flight time is approximately 1 hour 35 minutes, and this reinstatement reconnects Kathmandu and Kolkata as part of Buddha Air's international network.

== Destinations ==
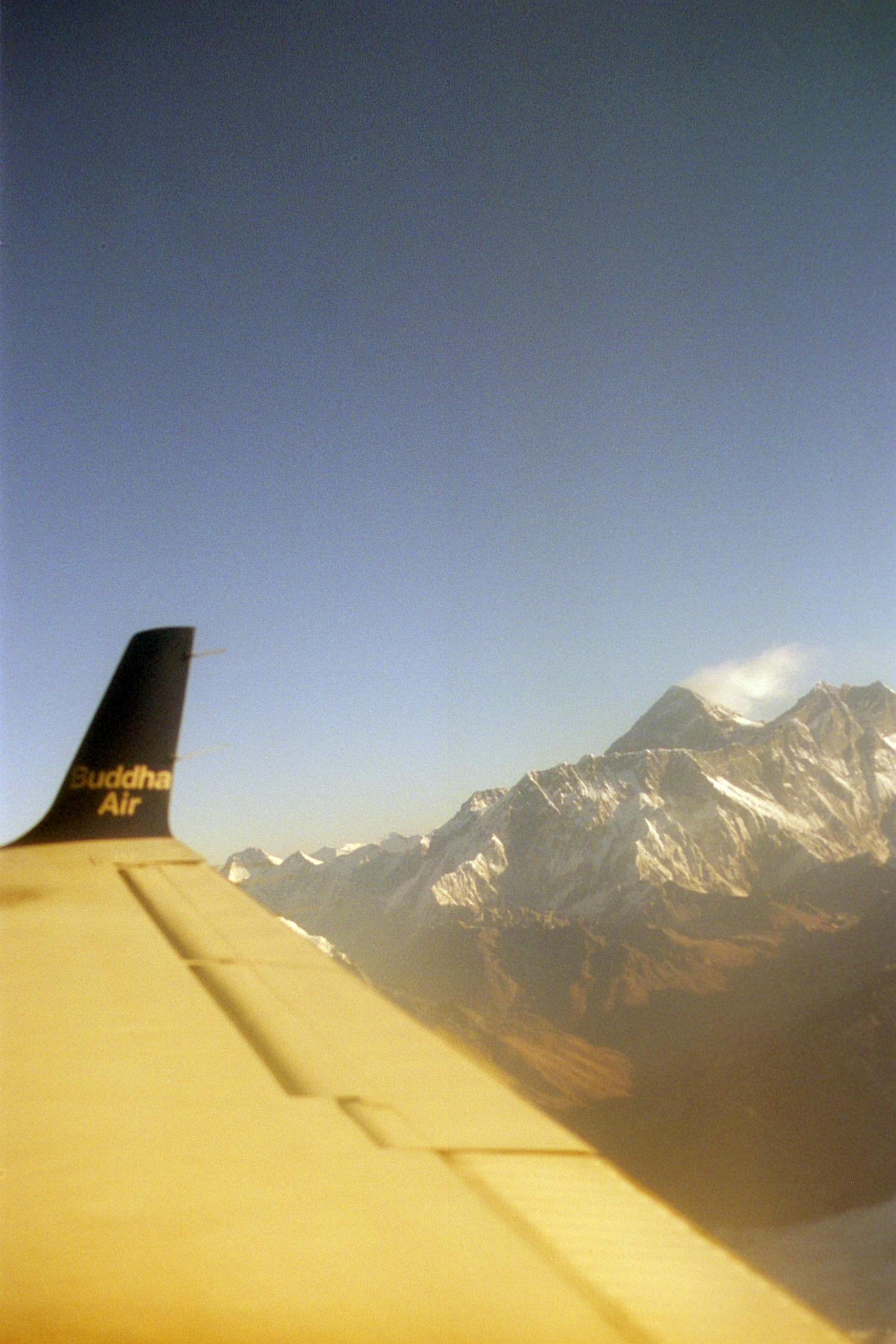
Buddha Air also operates flights to view mountains in the Himalayas.

Buddha Air flies to the following destinations as of August 2024.

Country	City	IATA	ICAO	Airport	Notes	Refs.
Bhutan	Paro	PBH	VQPR	Paro International Airport	Terminated	
India	Kolkata	CCU	VECC	Netaji Subhas Chandra Bose International Airport		
India	Lucknow	LKO	VILK	Chaudhary Charan Singh International Airport	Terminated	
India	Varanasi	VNS	VEBN	Lal Bahadur Shastri International Airport		
Nepal	Kathmandu	KTM	VNKT	Tribhuvan International Airport	Hub	
Nepal	Pokhara	PKR	VNPK	Pokhara Airport	Airport closed	
Nepal	Pokhara	PHH	VNPR	Pokhara International Airport	Secondary hub	
Nepal	Bhadrapur	BDP	VNCG	Bhadrapur Airport		
Nepal	Bhairahawa	BWA	VNBW	Gautam Buddha International Airport		
Nepal	Bharatpur	BHR	VNBP	Bharatpur Airport		
Nepal	Biratnagar	BIR	VNVT	Biratnagar Airport		
Nepal	Birendranagar	SKH	VNSK	Surkhet Airport		
Nepal	Dhangadhi	DHI	VNDH	Dhangadhi Airport		
Nepal	Janakpur	JKR	VNJP	Janakpur Airport		
Nepal	Jitpur Simara	SIF	VNSI	Simara Airport		
Nepal	Nepalgunj	KEP	VNNG	Nepalgunj Airport		
Nepal	Rajbiraj	RJB	VNRB	Rajbiraj Airport		
Nepal	Tumlingtar	TMI	VNTR	Tumlingtar Airport		

Buddha Air also operates scheduled mountain sightseeing flights from Kathmandu to Mount Everest range and from Pokhara to the Annapurna Massif. The flights usually depart in the early morning hours and return to the respective airports one hour later.

== Fleet ==
=== Current fleet ===
As of August 2025, Buddha Air operates the following aircraft:

Buddha Air fleet
Aircraft	In fleet	Orders	Passengers			Notes
Aircraft	In fleet	Orders	C	Y	Total	Notes
ATR 42–300	1	—	—	47	47	
ATR 72–500	15	—	—	72	72	
ATR 72-600	1	2				
Total	17	2				

=== Former fleet ===
Buddha Air historic fleet
Aircraft	Introduced	Retired	Notes
Beechcraft 1900C	2003	2009	
Beechcraft 1900D	1998	2023	
ATR 42–300	2008	2024	Decommissioned
ATR 42–300	2008	2026	Disposed
ATR 72–500	2010	2026	Decommissioned

== Hangar ==
Buddha Air is the first airline in Nepal, and one of few in South Asia, to have a closed-door hangar facility. Built at a cost of US$2.5 million at the Tribhuvan International Airport, Buddha Air also provides aircraft maintenance facilities to other airlines, including the Bangladeshi airline Novoair which sends its ATR aircraft for maintenance at the hangar.

Buddha Air is constructing a hangar that will be able to accommodate aircraft up to the size of an Airbus A319 at Pokhara International Airport.

== Accidents and incidents ==
- On 11 November 2003, a scheduled Buddha Air flight from Kathmandu enroute to Biratnagar mistakenly landed in Bhairahawa Airport, owing to the air traffic and a subsequent slip-up in communication in Kathmandu.
- On 25 September 2011, Buddha Air Flight 103 crashed while attempting to land at Tribhuvan International Airport after a sightseeing flight of the Mount Everest region. All 19 passengers and crew on board the Beechcraft 1900D died. Out of the 19 passengers, 10 were Indian nationals, two were US nationals, one was Japanese and six were Nepalese. The crew of three were also Nepalese.
- On 18 December 2020, Buddha Air Flight 505, which took off from Tribhuvan International Airport enroute to Janakpur Airport landed in Pokhara Airport. According to the airline, there was a mix-up due to lapses in communication and failure to follow detailed standard operating procedures.
- On 16 December 2021, Buddha Air Flight 360, which took off from Bharatpur Airport to Tribhuvan International Airport with 19 passengers and three crew on board, made an emergency landing at Bharatpur Airport when its left engine failed. Passengers were transferred to another flight and flown to Kathmandu.
- On 11 July 2024, Buddha Air Flight 805, an ATR 72-500 on a flight from Kathmandu, skidded off the runway as it landed at Gautam Buddha Airport. All 59 passengers and all four crew members were safely evacuated from the aircraft without injuries.
- On 2 January 2026, Buddha Air Flight 901, an ATR 72-500 on a flight from Kathmandu, suffered a runway excursion while landing at Bhadrapur Airport, injuring seven people.

== Sponsorships ==
In 2015, Buddha Air became the shirt sponsor of Biratnagar based football club Morang XI, who played in Nepal's highest football league, the Nepal National League.

== See also ==
- Birendra Bahadur Basnet
