= Mahendranagar Airport =

- IATA: XMG; ICAO: VNMN

Summary
- Airport type: Public
- Owner: Government of Nepal
- Operator: Civil Aviation Authority of Nepal
- Serves: Mahendranagar, Nepal
- Elevation AMSL: 650 ft / 198 m
- Coordinates: 28°57′48″N 80°08′53″E

Map
- Location of the airport in Nepal

Runways
Direction	Length		Surface
Direction	m	ft	Surface
17/35	884	2,900	Grass/Clay

Mahendranagar Airport (IATA: XMG, ICAO: VNMN) is a domestic airport in Mahendranagar serving Kanchanpur District, a district in Sudurpashchim Province in Nepal. It is the main tourist gateway to Shuklaphanta National Park.

== History ==
The airport started operations on 30 December 1973, but has been out of operation since 1999 and has turned into a grazing field for animals.

== Facilities ==
The airport resides at an elevation of 650 feet (198 m) above mean sea level. It has one runway which is 884 metres (2,900 ft) in length.

== Airlines and destinations ==
Currently, there are no scheduled services to and from Mahendranagar Airport.

== See also ==
List of airports in Nepal
