= Rolpa =

Rolpa may refer to:

- Rolpa Airport
- Rolpa Municipality
- Rolpa District
