= Khiji Chandeshwori Airport =

Airport in Khiji Chandeshwori, Nepal

- IATA: VNKC; ICAO: none

Summary
- Airport type: Private
- Operator: Civil Aviation Authority of Nepal
- Serves: Khiji Chandeshwari and Okhaldhunga District, Nepal
- Opened: 23 December 2019
- Elevation AMSL: 6,789 ft / 2,070 m
- Coordinates: 27°29′N 86°19′E

Map
- Location of airport in Nepal

Runways
Direction	Length		Surface
Direction	m	ft	Surface
15/33	580	1,903	Gravel

Khiji Chandeswori Domestic Airport (also known as Khiji Demba Airport) is a domestic airport in Khiji Chandeshwari in Okhaldhunga District in Koshi Province in Nepal. The airport is being constructed with the joint effort of Khijidemba Rural Municipality and the provincial government.

== Facilities ==
The airport resides at an elevation of 6,789 feet (2,069 m) above mean sea level. It has one runway which is 580 metres (1,903 ft) in length.

== Airlines and destinations ==
Tara Air has already conducted a test flight to this airport and is planning to operate scheduled services to Kathmandu.
