= Dhangadhi Airport =

Dhangadhi Airport धनगढी विमानस्थल
- IATA: DHI; ICAO: VNDH

Summary
- Airport type: Public
- Owner: Government of Nepal
- Operator: Civil Aviation Authority of Nepal
- Location: Dhangadhi
- Elevation AMSL: 690 ft (210 m)
- Coordinates: 28°45′12″N 80°34′55″E
- Website: dhangadhi.caanepal.gov.np

Map
- Location of airport in Nepal

Runways
Direction	Length		Surface
Direction	m	ft	Surface
09/27	1,800	5,906	Asphalt

Dhangadhi Airport (IATA: DHI, ICAO: VNDH) is a domestic airport located in Dhangadhi serving Kailali District, a district in Sudurpashchim Province in Nepal. Dhangadhi Airport is also a regional airport which serves the district of Sudurpashchim Province and Rara Airport of Mugu district. Some commercial airlines operates helicopter services from Dhangadhi Airport to Khaptad National Park, Api Base Camp, Saipal Base Camp and Badimalika region.

Dhangadhi Airport has the longest runway among domestic airport in Nepal. Dhangadhi Airport is on the process to be upgraded to an international airport as proposed by the government to boost tourism in Sudurpaschim Province and Karnali Province with land acquisition process completed required for international airport.

== History ==
Dhangadhi Airport was established on 6 July 1958. In 2022, Nepal Airlines relaunched regional operations from Dhangadhi Airport making it the airline's western-most hub.

== Facilities ==
The airport is located at an elevation of 210 metres (689 ft) above mean sea level. It has one asphalted runway which is 1,800 metres (5,906 ft) in length. And this airport is equipped with a Non-Directional Beacon (NDB) for navigation and handles traffic under Visual Flight Rules (VFR) during standard operating hours. While traditionally a daylight-only facility, recent upgrades include the installation of runway edge lighting and Runway Threshold Identification Lights (RTIL) on Runway 33 to support late-evening operations.

== Airlines and destinations ==
Airlines	Destinations
Buddha Air	Kathmandu, Pokhara
Nepal Airlines	Bajura, Dipayal Silgadhi, Jayaprithvi
Saurya Airlines	Kathmandu
Shree Airlines	Kathmandu

== See also ==
List of airports in Nepal
