= Rolpa Airport =

Airport in Rolpa, Nepal

- IATA: RPA; ICAO: VNRP

Summary
- Airport type: Public
- Owner: Government of Nepal
- Operator: Civil Aviation Authority of Nepal (CAAN)
- Serves: Rolpa Municipality
- Location: Rolpa District, Lumbini Province, Nepal
- Opened: November 6, 1980
- Coordinates: 28°16′03″N 082°45′23″E

Map

Rolpa Airport is an airport in Rolpa District, Lumbini Province, Nepal.

The ICAO code is VNRP and the IATA code is RPA. It is currently not in operation.

note: it was not available right know

== See also ==
- List of airports in Nepal
