= Nalinchowk Heliport =

Nalinchowk Heliport नलिञ्चोक हेलिपोर्ट
- IATA: n/a; ICAO: none

Summary
- Serves: Kathmandu Valley
- Location: Bhaktapur
- Opened: 21 June 2024
- Coordinates: 27°39′01″N 85°27′54″E
- Interactive map of Nalinchowk Heliport

Nalinchowk Heliport (IATA: n/a) is a heliport located in Bhaktapur, in the Kathmandu Valley in Nepal, constructed to relieve helicopter operations at Tribhuvan International Airport.

== History ==
In 2022, the Civil Aviation Authority of Nepal began construction of a new heliport within Kathmandu Valley to reduce traffic congestion at Tribhuvan International Airport, with construction beginning in late 2023. It opened in June 2024.

After its opening, the heliport was criticized for lacking safety mechanisms such as its own control tower and refueling facilities. On 11 July, roughly two weeks after opening, operations were halted by pilots due to these concerns. Some news outlets claimed that operations were stopped due to a lack of demand.
