= Janakpur Airport =

Airport in Madhesh Province 2, South-East Nepal

Janakpur Airport जनकपुर बिमानस्थल
- IATA: JKR; ICAO: VNJP

Summary
- Airport type: Public
- Owner: Government of Nepal
- Operator: Civil Aviation Authority of Nepal (CAAN)
- Serves: Janakpur
- Location: Dhanusa District, Madhesh Province
- Focus city for: Buddha Air; Yeti Airlines
- Time zone: NST (UTC+05:45)
- Elevation AMSL: 256 ft (78 m)
- Coordinates: 26°42′31″N 085°55′20″E
- Website: janakpur.caanepal.gov.np

Map
- Location of airport in Nepal

Runways
Direction	Length		Surface
Direction	m	ft	Surface
09/27	1,300	3,300	Asphalt
- Source: DAFIF

Janakpur Airport (IATA: JKR, ICAO: VNJP) is an airport serving Janakpur, a city in Mithila region of Nepal and the administrative headquarters of the Dhanusa District in Madhesh Province in Nepal.

== Facilities ==
The airport is at an elevation of 256 feet (78 m) above mean sea level. It has one runway designated 09/27 with an asphalt surface measuring 1,300 by 30 metres (4,265 ft × 98 ft).

The airport is capable to handle aircraft from the Nepalese Army Air Service.

No facilities are available in the airport premise. There are very few shops inside the airport premise.

== Airlines and destinations ==
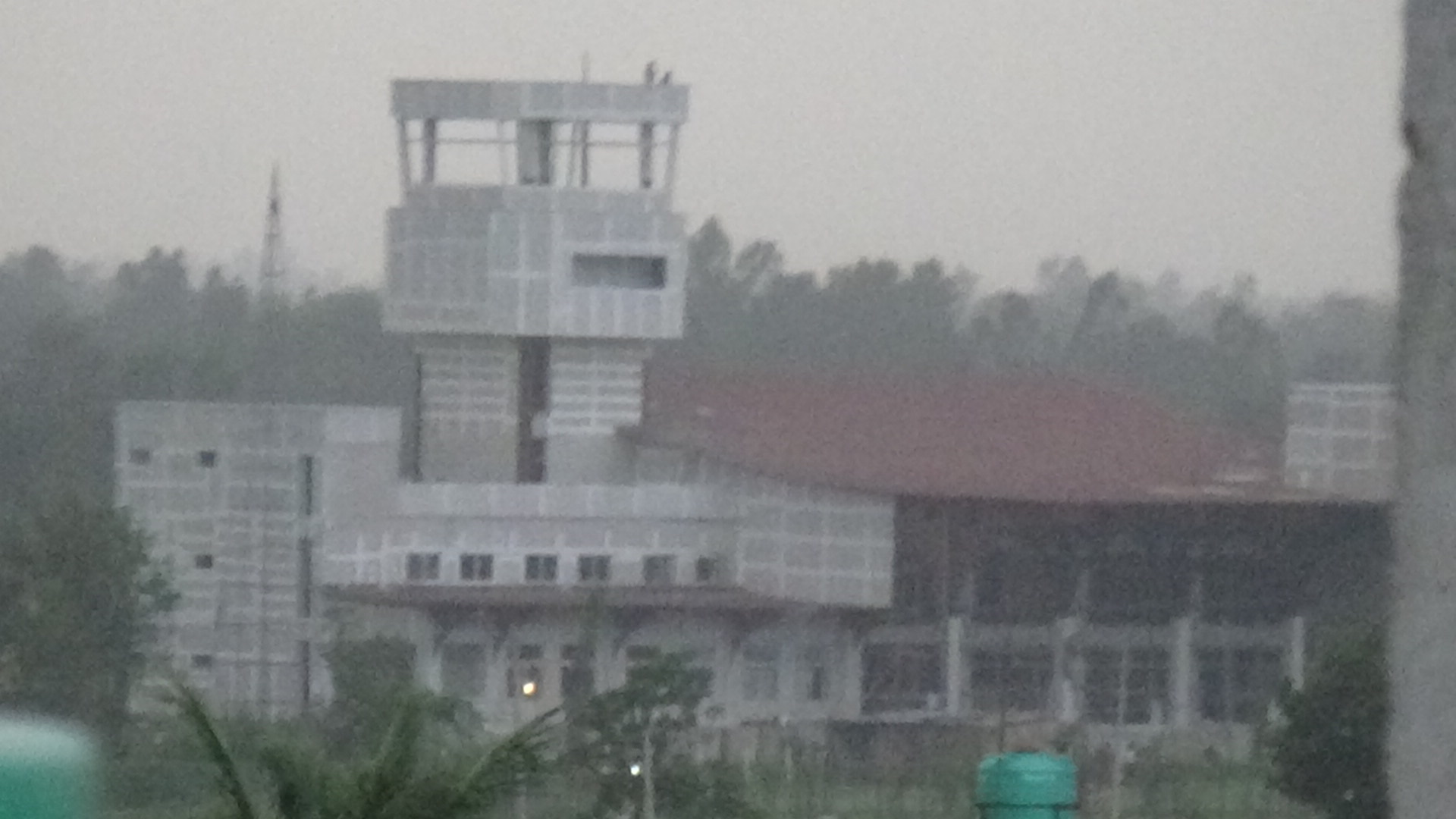
Janakpur Airport Tower New

Airlines	Destinations	Refs.
Buddha Air	Kathmandu, Pokhara–International	
Shree Airlines	Kathmandu	
Yeti Airlines	Kathmandu	

== See also ==
- List of airports in Nepal
