= Gautam Buddha International Airport =

International airport in Bhairahawa, Siddharthanagar, Lumbini Pradesh, Nepal

Gautam Buddha International Airport गौतम बुद्ध अन्तर्राष्ट्रिय विमानस्थल
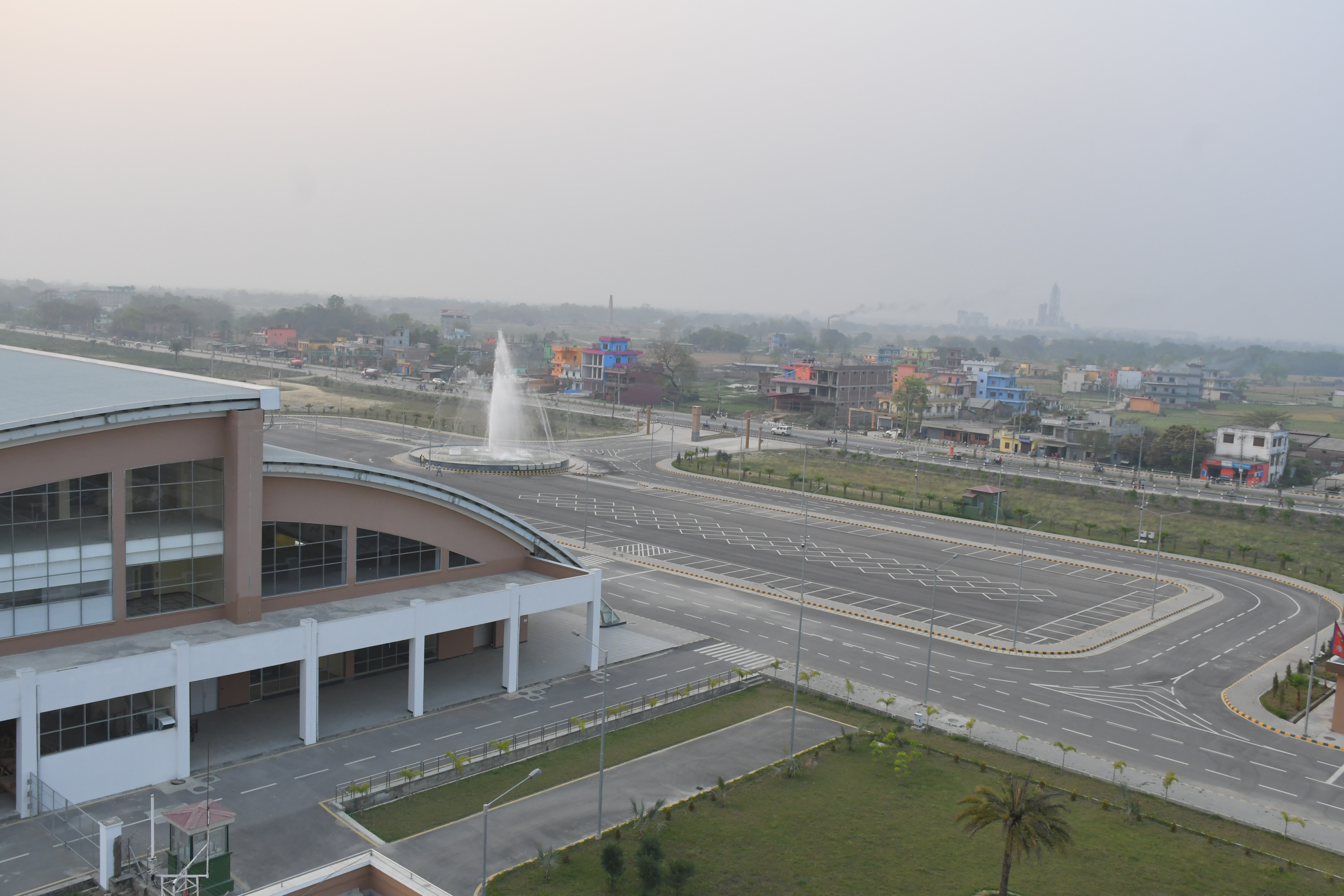

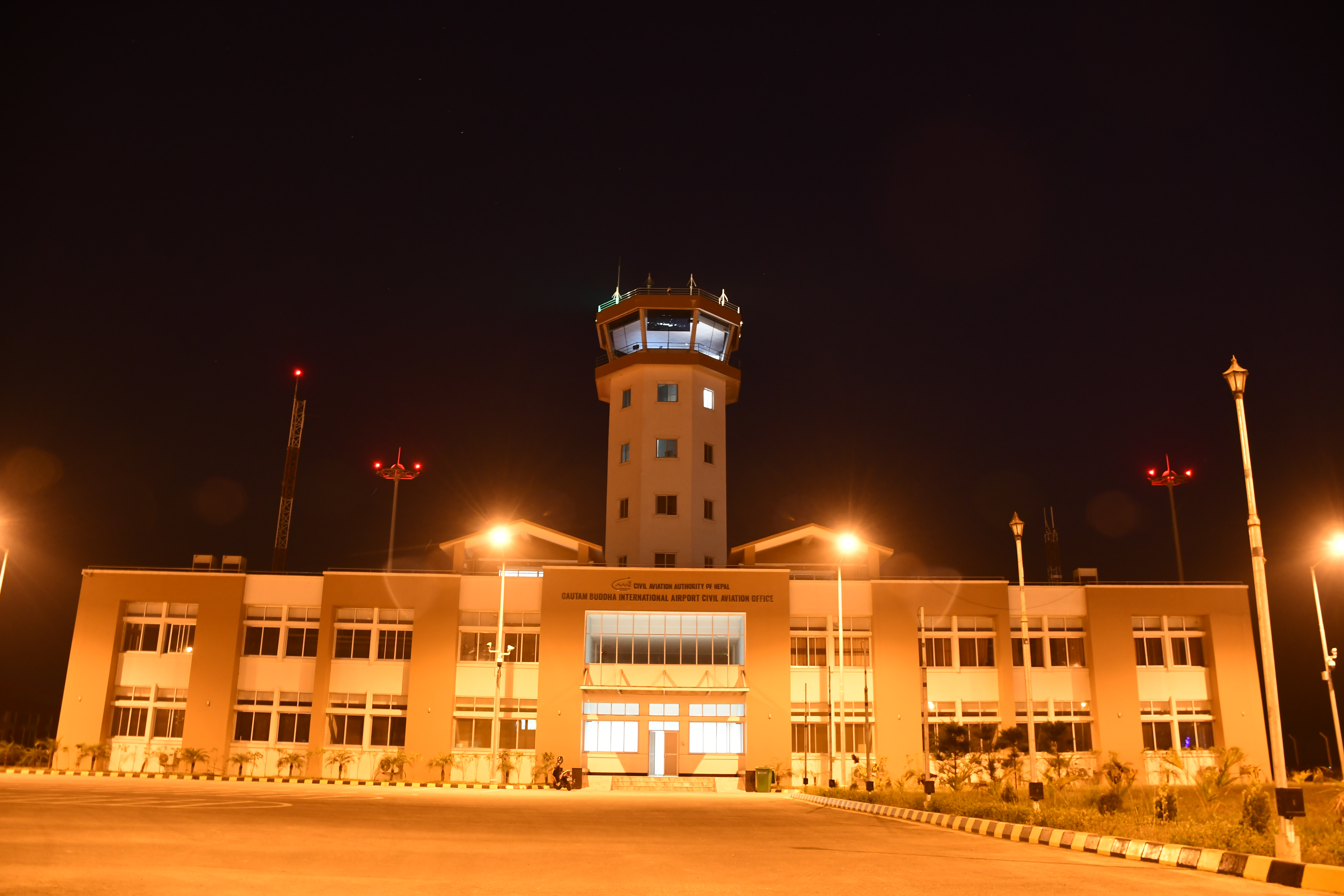
- IATA: BWA; ICAO: VNBW

Summary
- Airport type: Public
- Owner: Government of Nepal
- Operator: Civil Aviation Authority of Nepal
- Location: Siddharthanagar
- Opened: 8 July 1958; 68 years ago
- Elevation AMSL: 105 m (344 ft)
- Coordinates: 27°30′20″N 083°24′58″E
- Website: gbia.caanepal.gov.np

Map
- Location in Nepal BWA (Nepal)

Runways
Direction	Length		Surface
Direction	m	ft	Surface
10/28f	3,000	9,843	Asphalt

Statistics
- Land Area: 543.78 ha
- Source: DAFIF

Gautam Buddha International Airport (IATA: BWA, ICAO: VNBW) — also known as Bhairahawa Airport — is an international airport located in Siddharthanagar (formerly and colloquially still called Bhairahawa) serving Lumbini in Lumbini Province, as well as the Butwal﹣Siddharthanagar urban agglomeration in Nepal. In May 2022, it became Nepal's second international airport, after previously only handling domestic services.

== History ==
The airport was opened as a domestic airport called Bhairahawa Airport providing flights to Kathmandu in 1958 and has since been operated by the Civil Aviation Authority of Nepal. In 1985, the airport was one of the target of the Nepal bombings. In 1977, the airport was renamed Gautam Buddha Airport in honor of Gautam Buddha, who was born in the neighboring village of Lumbini.

=== Expansion to international airport ===
First plans to develop the then domestic airport into Nepal's second international airport were developed in 2013 with the aim of operating the upgraded airport by 2017, in order to relieve the congested Tribhuvan International Airport.

The project was financed by a loan and grant aid from the Asian Development Bank. The contract to upgrade the airport was awarded to the Chinese company Northwest Civil Aviation Airport Construction Group in October 2014.

In January 2015, prime minister Sushil Koirala laid the foundation stone of the new airport with the aim of beginning operations at the airport by December 2017. It was planned to have a 3,000 metres (9,843 ft) runway and sixteen international parking bays. In 2017, the upgrade was delayed for more than six months and the deadline for the completion was extended to 2019 due to the 2015 Nepal earthquake and the 2015 Nepal blockade. In July 2019, the project's deadline was extended and the expansion was expected to be completed by December 2019. Due to the COVID-19 pandemic in Nepal, the opening of the airport was postponed again in July 2020 to March 2021. In June 2021, the opening was again postponed until early 2022, as final tests could not take place during monsoon season.

In late 2021, the calibration flights were postponed due to the COVID-19 pandemic in Nepal, resulting in further postponement of the opening of the airport. These flights took place in February 2022.

On 30 January 2022, the official opening date was set to Buddha Jayanti on 26 May 2022.

In March 2022, it was announced that Jazeera Airways would be the first international airline to serve the airport.

On 21 April 2022, the newly built 3,000 m runway was opened while the old one was put into use as a taxiway.

The airport was officially opened with the arrival of the first international flight by Jazeera Airways on 16 May 2022.

As of November 2022, only one international carrier served the airport. The Civil Aviation Authority of Nepal (CAAN) forced any airline operating more than three flights a day from Nepal's other international airport, Tribhuvan International Airport to also operate from Gautam Buddha Airport. This sparked a controversy, as CAAN canceled flights by Nepal Airlines as the airline did not comply with this ruling.

By the end of 2022, there were no international flights, as all carriers suspended their services due to the low visibility due to the winter weather.

== Facilities ==
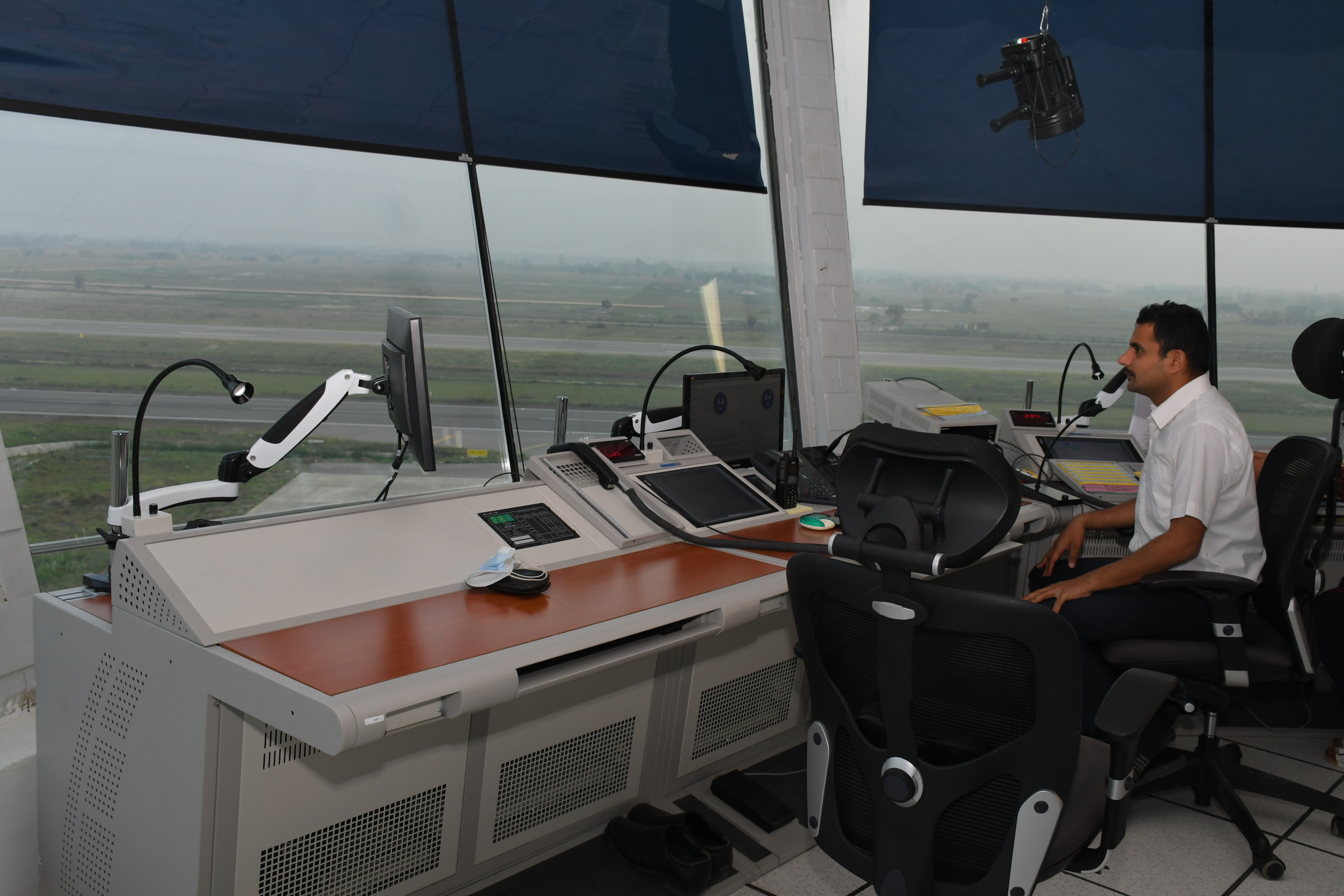
Gautam Buddha International Airport ATC

=== Runway ===
The airport has one runway designated 10/28 with an Asphalt concrete (Bituminous Paved) surface measuring 3,000 by 45 metres (9,843 ft × 148 ft). It has an east-west orientation with a designation of 10/28 and a 200 meters Runway End Safety Area (RESA) on both side. It features a 1,500-meter x 23 meters parallel taxiway (10-28) used previously for the domestic airplanes.

=== Aids to Landing and Navigation ===
Advanced navigational aids and airport lighting for safety and navigation is installed. There are two non-precision approach available at the Gautam Buddha Airport; VHF omnidirectional range along a distance measuring equipment (DVOR/DME) and Required Area Navigation (RNAV/RNP). A non-directional (radio) beacon (NDB) is installed at the northern side of the airport. One Automatic Dependent Surveillance Broadcasting (ADS-B) Sensor has been installed by CAAN at Bhairahawa to extend the surveillance coverage within the local airspace. There is an instrument landing system available to allow aircraft landing even in reduced visibility. The airport also possesses a visual guidance system which gives visual information to the pilot attempting to park the aircraft at the airport parking bay.

ILS at the airport is installed but not functional as Indian Skies will be used to fully implement it. On 2 June 2023 India has granted clearance for operation of Instrument Landing System (ILS) at the Gautam Buddha international Airport in Bhairahawa.

=== Terminals ===
The airport consists of two public terminals at the airport, one for international traffic and one for domestic traffic. During the upgrade to an international airport, but before the opening of it, the Ministry of Culture, Tourism and Civil Aviation announced to build a new 35,000 m^{2} international terminal for the airport. The current terminal would be used as domestic terminal afterwards. The Government of Nepal sought suggestions on different designs for terminals of Gautam Buddha International Airport through social media. The new terminal would have 4 Sky-bridges, which the current terminal is lacking.

== Airlines and destinations ==
Airlines	Destinations
Buddha Air	Kathmandu, Pokhara
Shree Airlines	Kathmandu
Thai AirAsia	Bangkok–Don Mueang
Yeti Airlines	Kathmandu

Notes:

^1 Both, Flydubai's as well as Qatar Airways's outbound flights from Siddhartangar to Dubai or Doha make a stop in Kathmandu. However, the airlines do not have traffic rights to transport passengers solely between Siddhartanagar and Kathmandu.

== Access ==
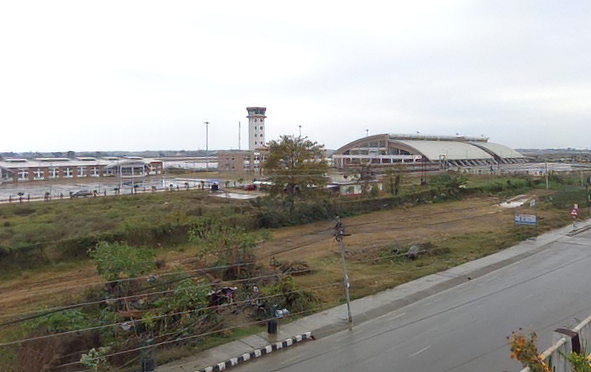
View of Gautam Buddha International Airport from north western side

The airport is located near National Highway 05, which was enlarged in 2018 to ease access to the airport.

== Ground transportation ==
As of 2020 it is planned that a system of electric buses will serve Gautam Buddha Airport.

== Sustainability ==
It was planned that ground vehicles used at the airport would be fully electric. Currently there are nine fast charging stations installed in this airport. There are plans to make the airport fully solar powered, only the second airport worldwide to do so.

== Incidents and accidents ==
- 5 November 1960 – A Royal Nepal Airlines Douglas DC-3 crashed upon take-off at Bhairahawa Airport and caught fire. All 4 crew members died. There were no passengers on board.
- 7 August 1995 – An Indian Airlines Douglas DC-8 crashlanded at Bhairahawa Airport, killing one pilot.
- 24 September 2016 – A Yeti Airlines BAe Jetstream 41 en route from Kathmandu overran the runway while landing at Gautam Buddha Airport. All 29 passengers and the crew of 3 were unhurt but the aircraft was damaged beyond repair.
- 11 July 2024 - A Buddha Air ATR 72-500, which was flying from Kathmandu, skidded off the runway as it landed at Gautam Buddha Airport. All 59 passengers and including four crew members, have been safely evacuated from the plane without injuries.
