= Khiji Chandeshwari =

Khiji Chandeshwari खिजी चण्डेश्वरी Khiji
- Village development committee
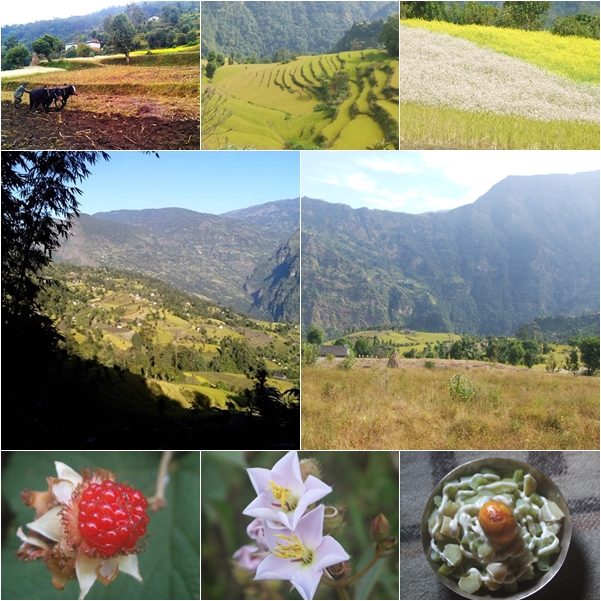
- Nickname: खिजी
- Location in Nepal
- Coordinates: 27.43°N 86.31°E
- Country: Nepal
- Zone: Sagarmatha Zone
- District: Okhaldhunga District

Government

Population (2010)
  - Total: 4,044

Languages
  - Sunuwar, Kiranti: Nepali
- Time zone: UTC+5:45 (Nepal Time)
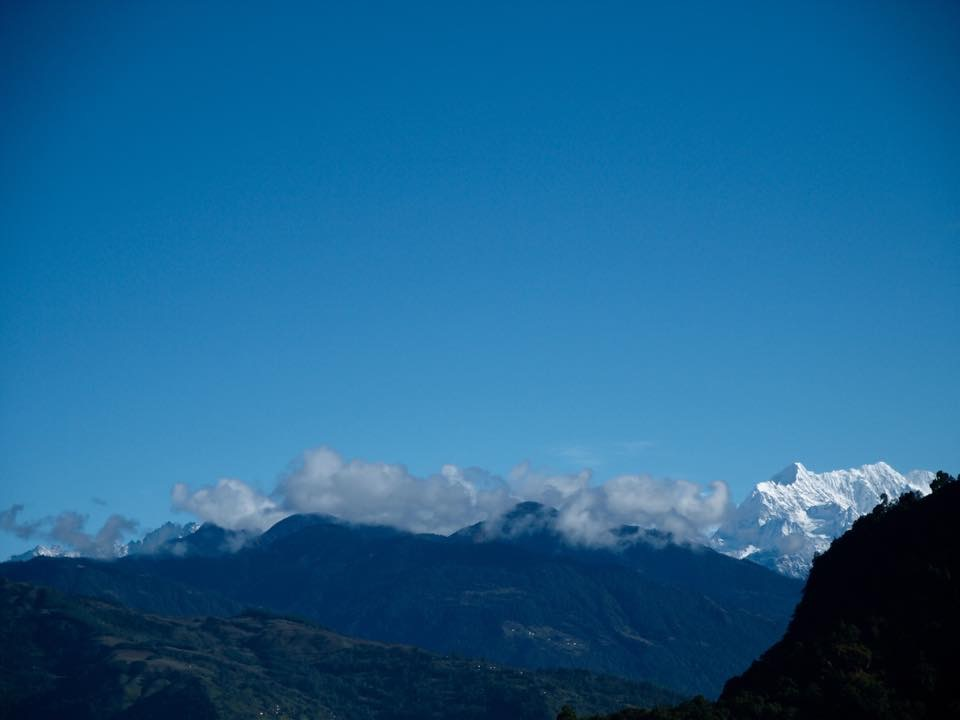
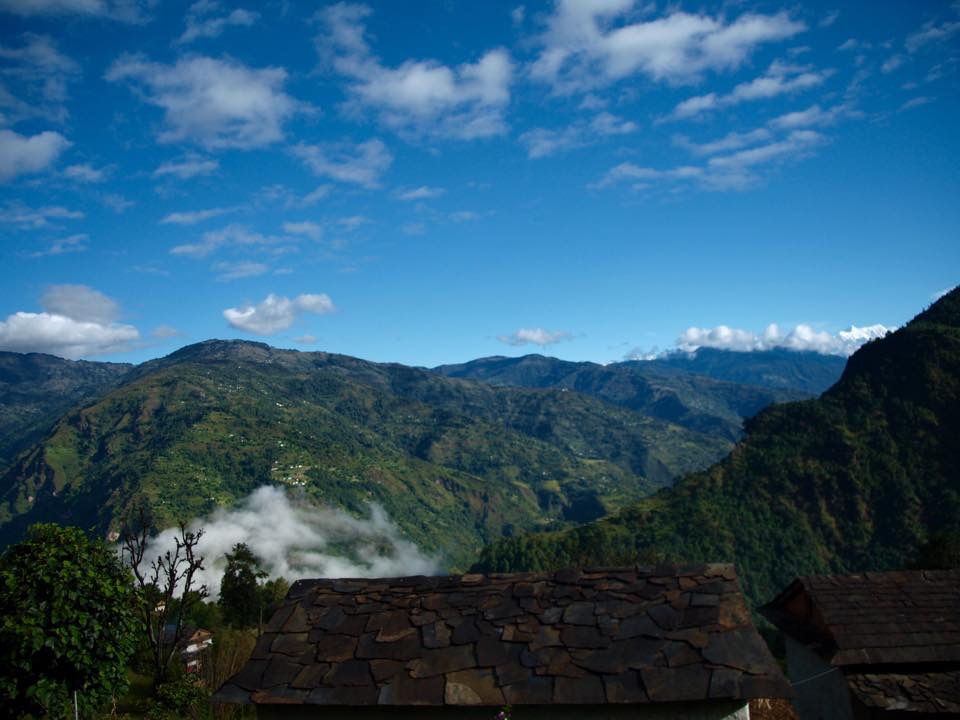
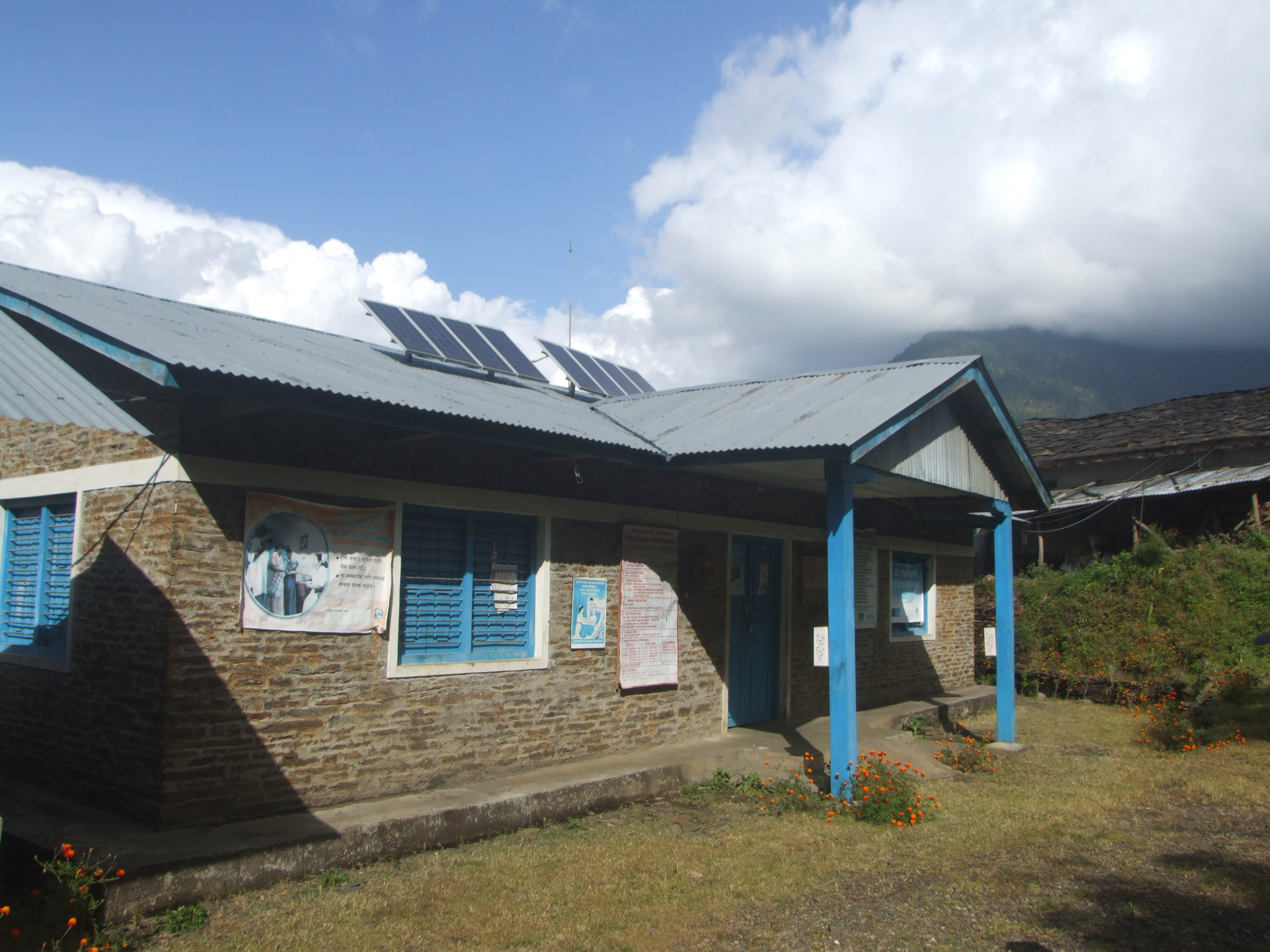
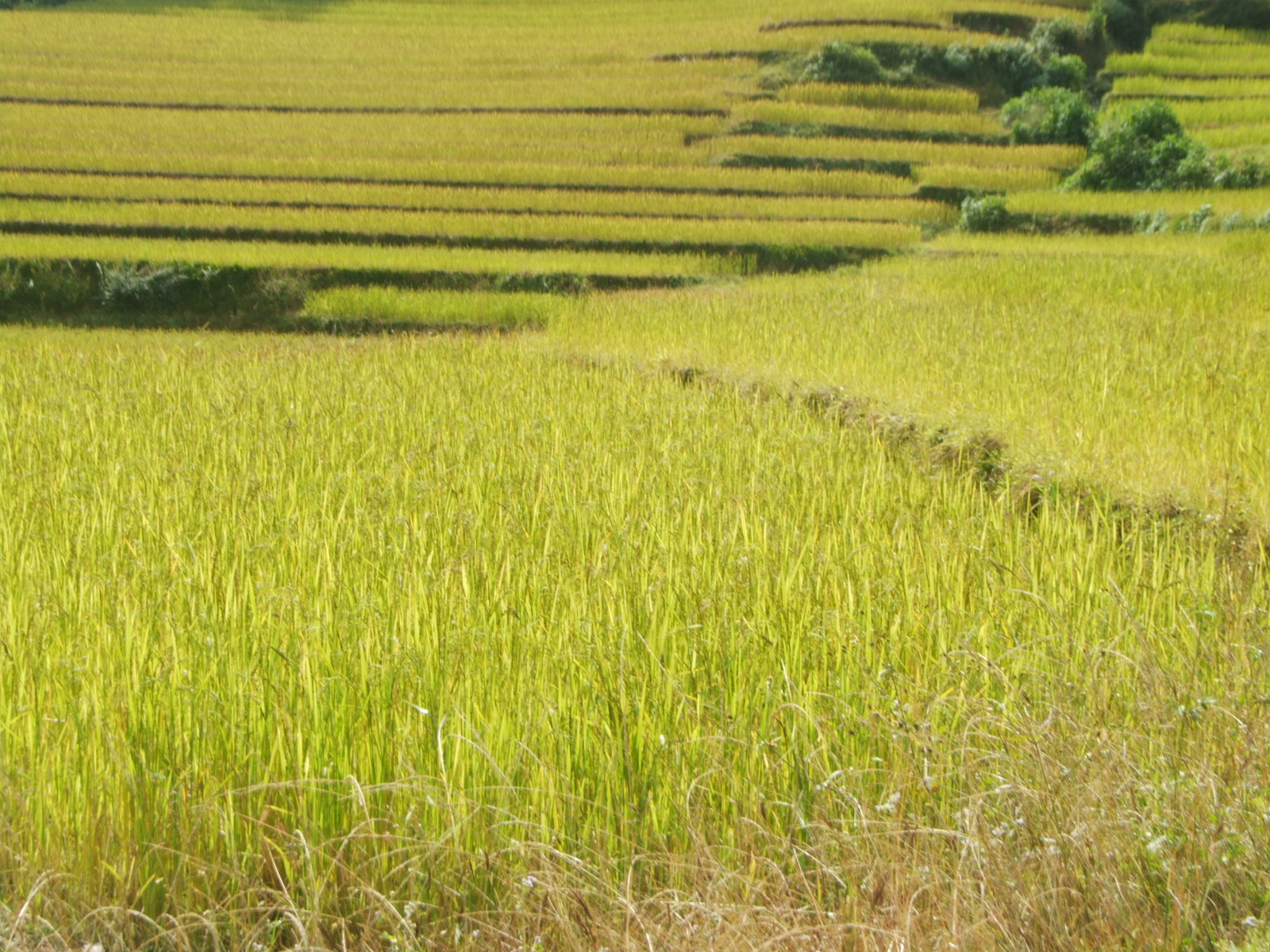
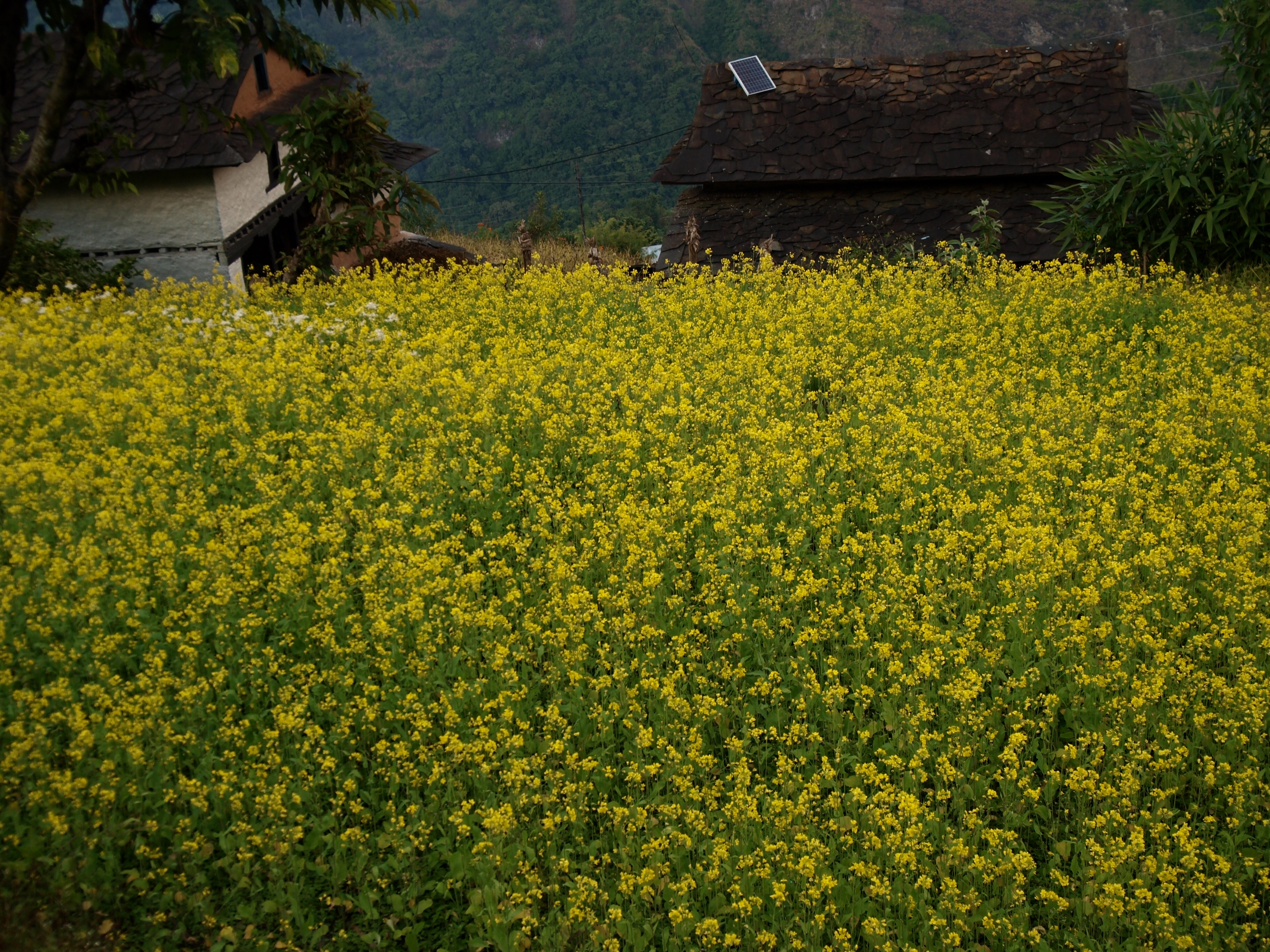
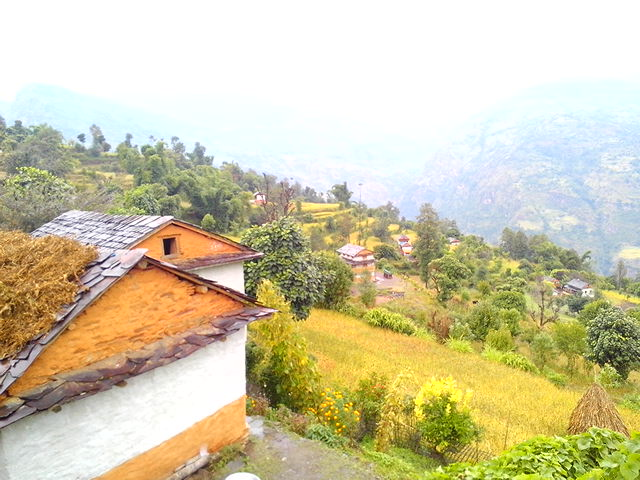
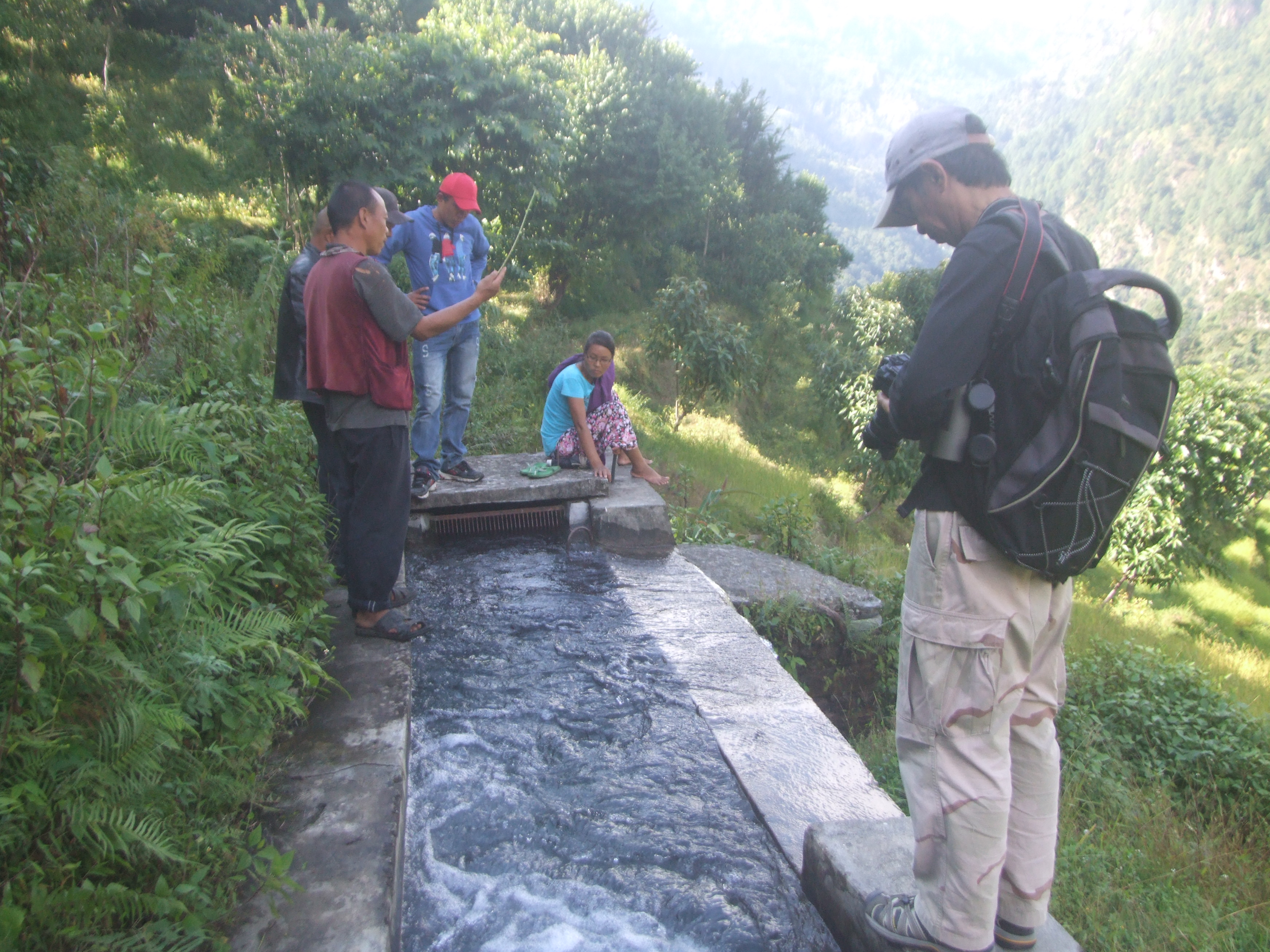
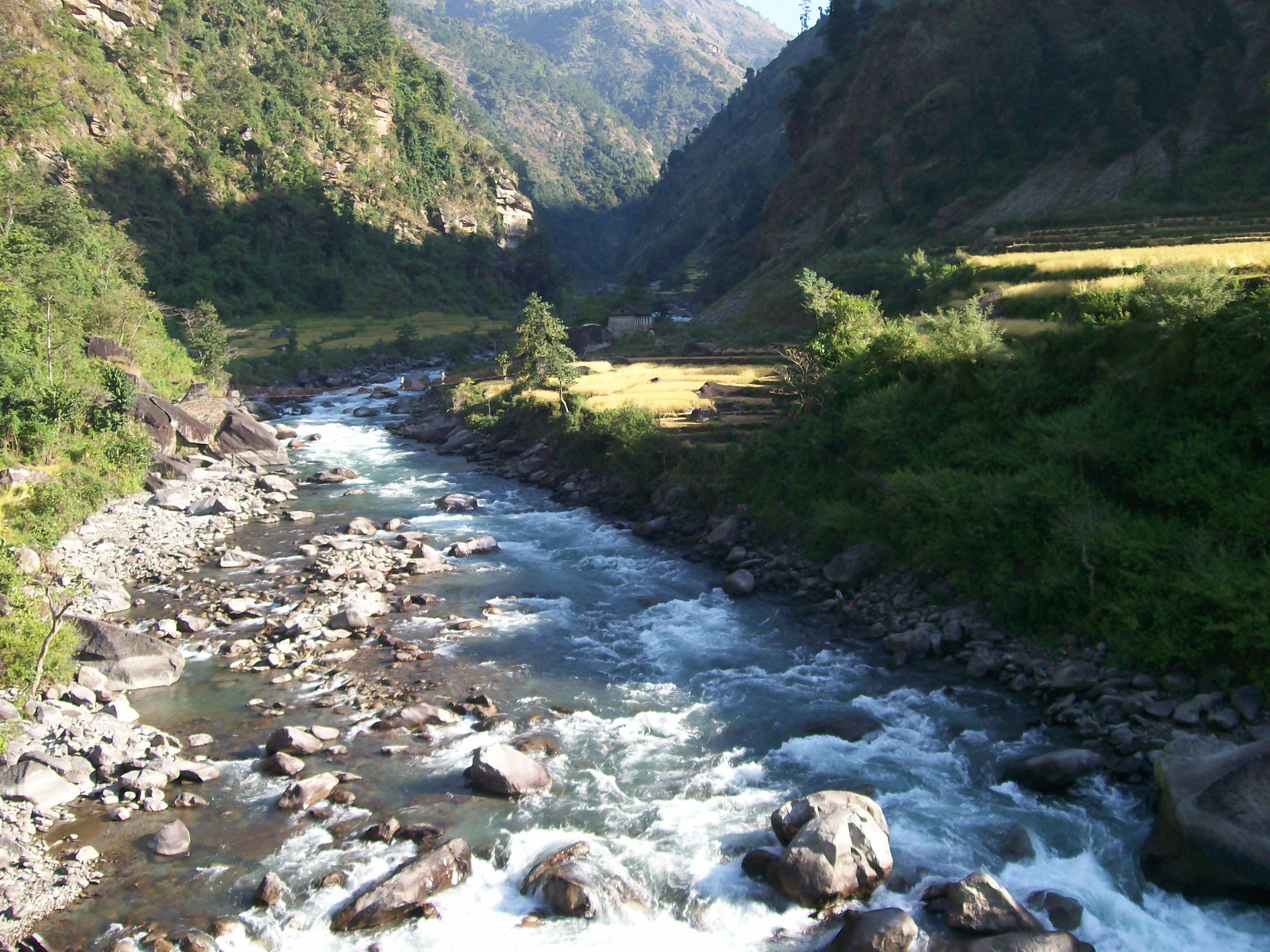
- From Top left to right Khiji Mountain, view, Health-post, Rice field, Mustard field, House, Hydro-power, Likhu Khola At Khiji Nepal

Khiji Chandeshwari खिँजी/खिँचि, Chandeshowar mispronounce Chandeshwari or Original Name Khiji (jee/chee/ji) and Chandi-Showar became Chandeshwari खिजी चण्डेश्वरी is a village development committee in Okhaldhunga District in the Sagarmatha Zone of mid-eastern Nepal. At the time of the 1991 Nepal census it had a population of 3001 living in 590 individual households.

Khiji or Khijee and Khichee (खिँजी-खिँचि) is same tone. Is Koich (Sunuwar language),
1. Khichi/khijee (खिँजी-खिँचि) Name of Father Koich(Sunuwar) सुनुवार जाति
2. Khi = House, Administrative Regions, State and Ji (Chee/Jee) = Behind, Ancestry, Person (is mean Behind State of Ji (sunuwar)
The Village: Khijee Chandeswari Village Development Committee (VDC) is situated in Eastern Development Region of the country. The district is Okhaldhunga and the zone is Sagarmatha. The VDC covers around 35 square kilometers with around 4000 villagers. The village has one secondary school.

== other name of Khiji ==
- Khijee
- Majh Gaun (Central)
- Chandeshwari, (Chandi culture)

Phalate and Kati separate from Khiji Chandeshwari at 1980 to 1989.

== Ethnicities ==
Around 83% out of around 4000 villagers are from indigenous group of people. Their caste is called Sunuwar (Mukhiya) (Kirat)Dynasty. They have their own traditions, cultures, language and customs etc. The rest are NEWAR, Bhujel and Sherpa also indigenous, and Pariyar (Hindu caste), Bishokarma also (Hindu caste). Indigenous people are not Hindu caste.

== Occupations ==
Around 95% of villagers are depended on agriculture. They have little piece of land where they cultivate crops in a traditional way. The agriculture products last for only 6–8 months and the rest of the year they just live with half stomach.

== Education ==
Education is light of life. In Khiji Chandeswari Village Development Committee, there is no even a university. After the completion of lower secondary and high secondary education the students need to walk at least 90 minutes to reach the 10+2 which are situated in other Villages. There are very few students who have the luck to see the college and university. They can be count on fingers.
श्री चन्डेश्वरी माध्यमिक विद्यालय, खिजी ओखलढुङ्गा Shree Chandeshwari Madhyamik Vidyalaya Koshpala, Khiji, Okhaldhunga, Nepal

== Development ==
The district headquarters is approximately 35 kilometers from the village. Almost all local development administrations are situated in the headquarters of the district. Being an uneducated people, there is no one to support for the development of the village. There is no infrastructural development in the village except a health post and a lower secondary school. It takes around 18 hours to reach the close road transportation from the village. Many people even just day dream about motor-bus and aero-planes. They did not see the real motor buses and aero planes in their life. There is no electricity, so the villagers have to depend on wood fuel. There is no safe drinking water and irrigation for agriculture. There is no any scientific cultivation system. People just follow traditional agriculture system and depend on rainfall for cultivation. All the above-mentioned truths are the true story of Khijee Chandeswari Village.

== Language ==
Sunuwar koich Lo sunuwar

== Halli Game ==
Halli is Game of Sunuwar : हाल्ली खेल

== Sakela Naach ==
Sunuwar culture

== Trekking area ==
Khiji Tholedemaba trek and route of Everes Base camp

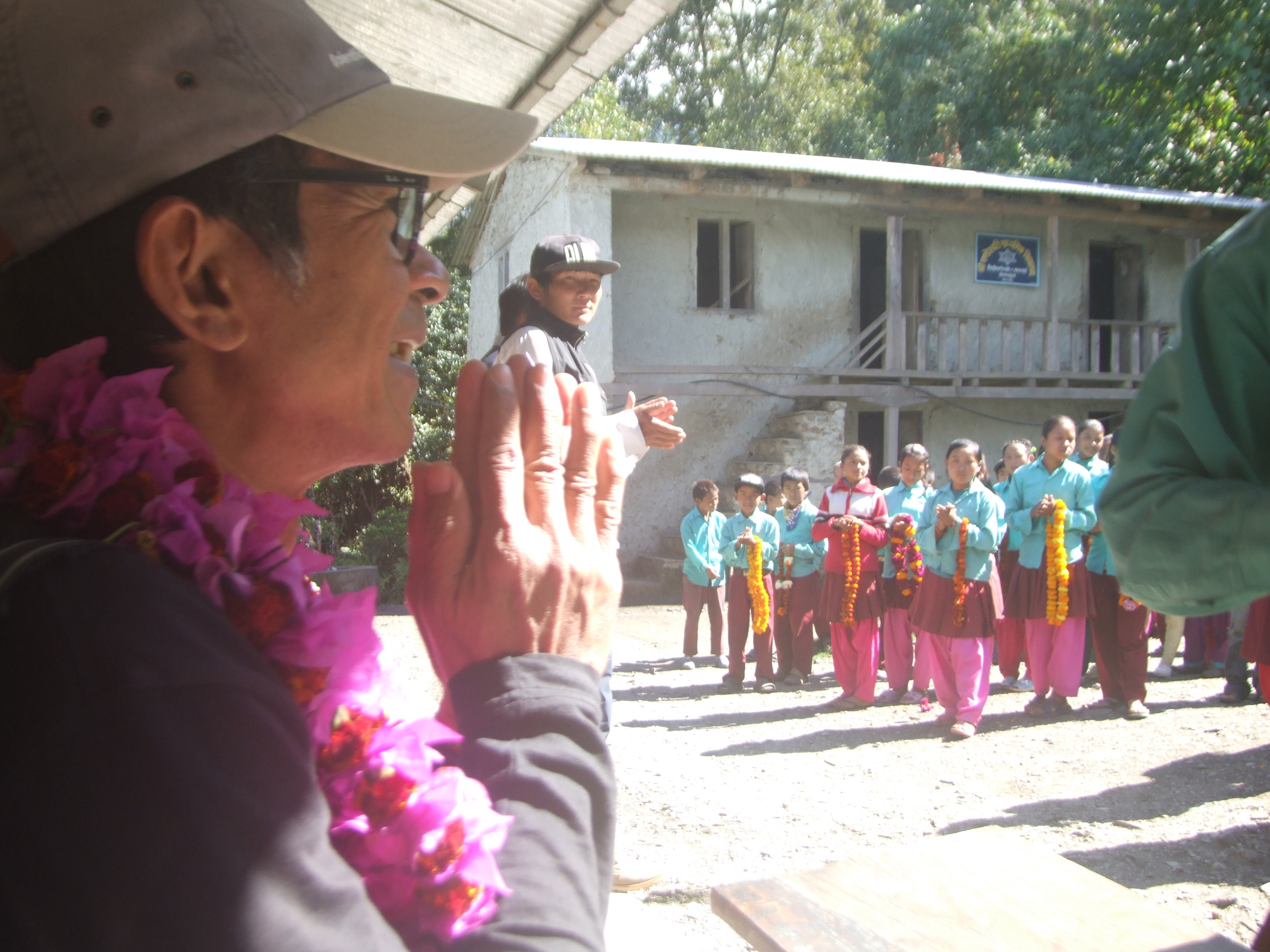
At School (Thai Guest)

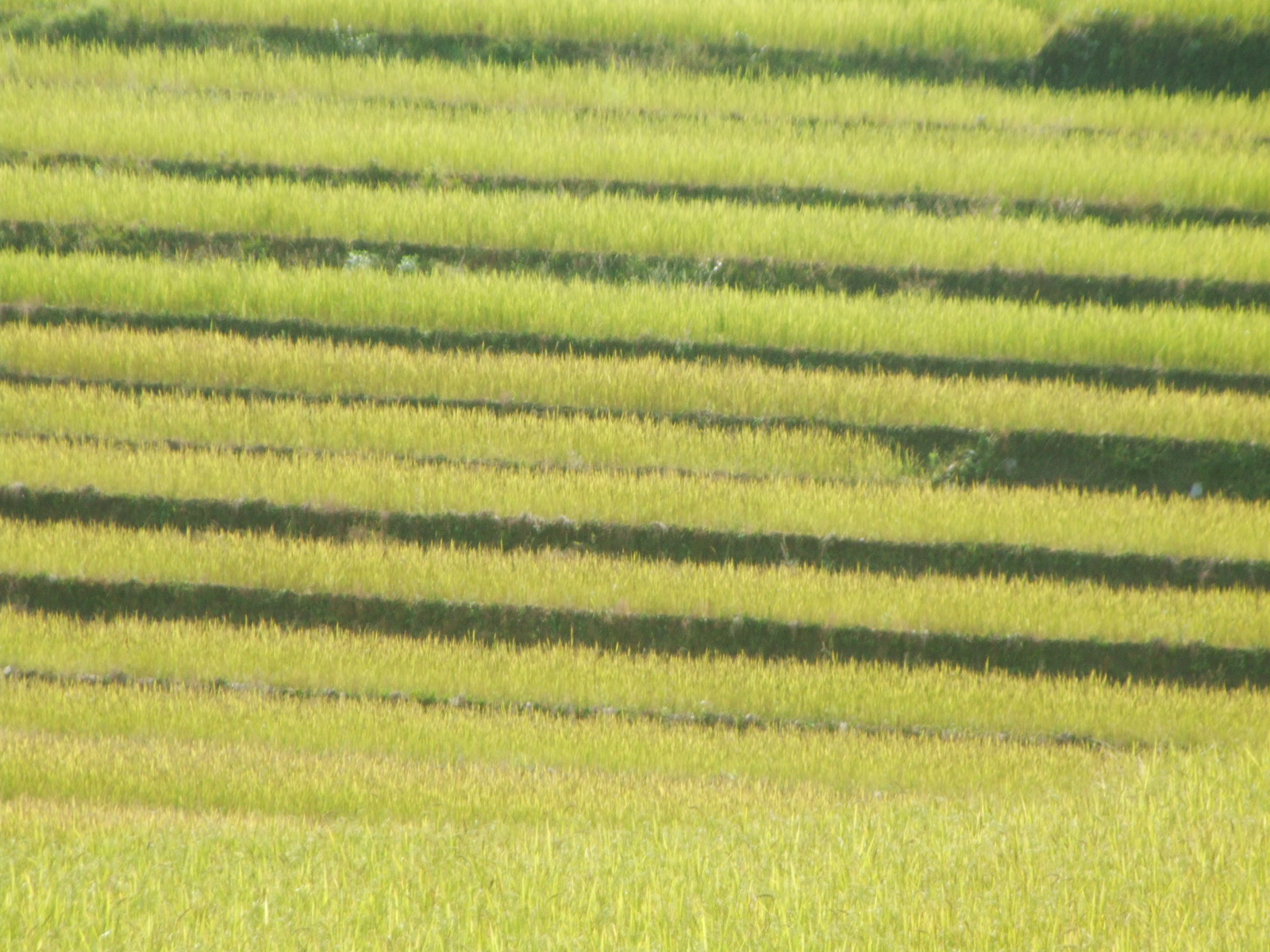
Rice Field

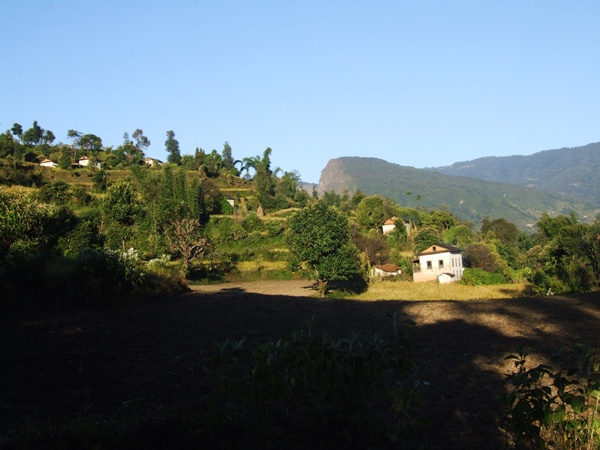
Gaun, village

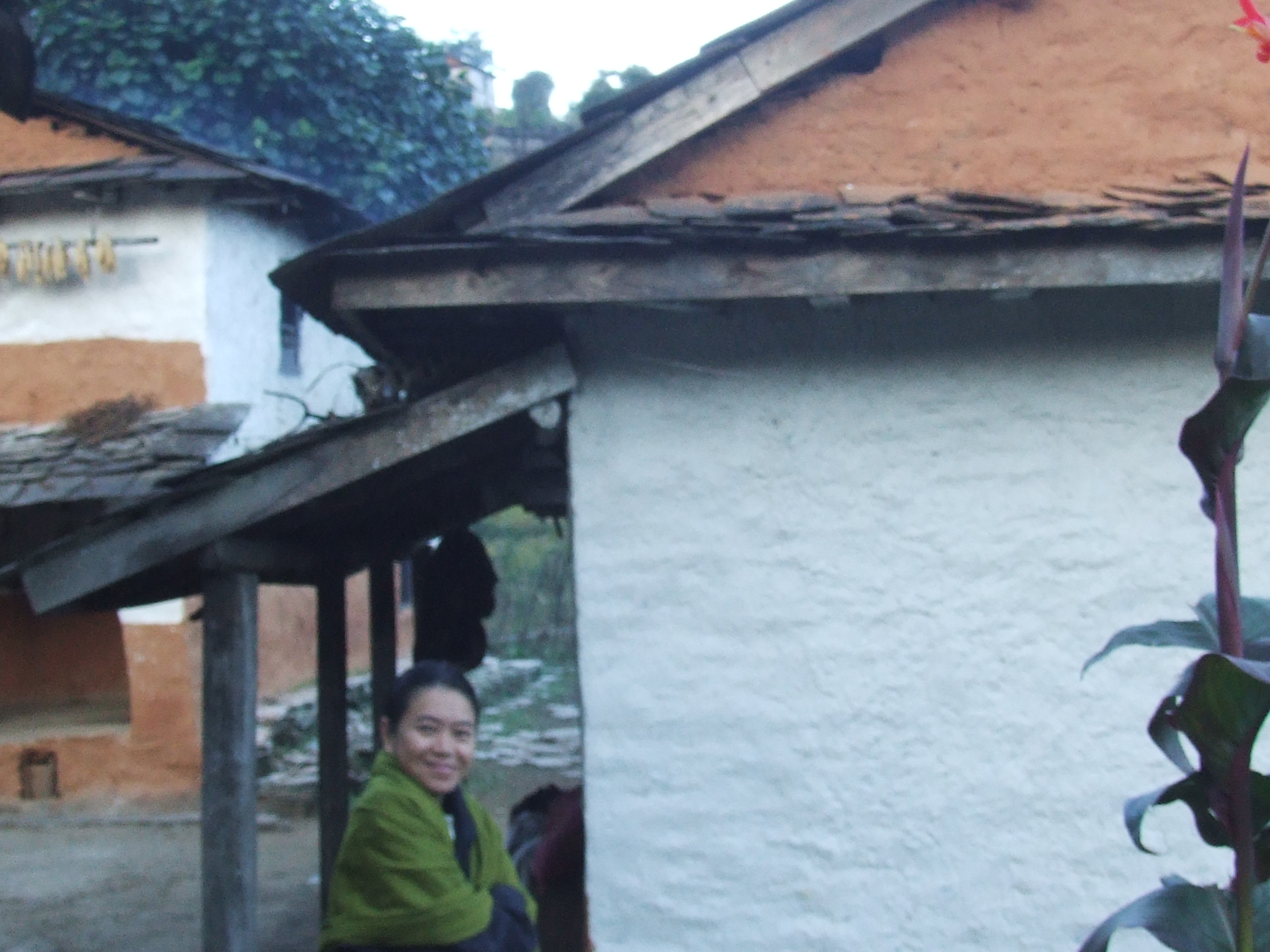
House

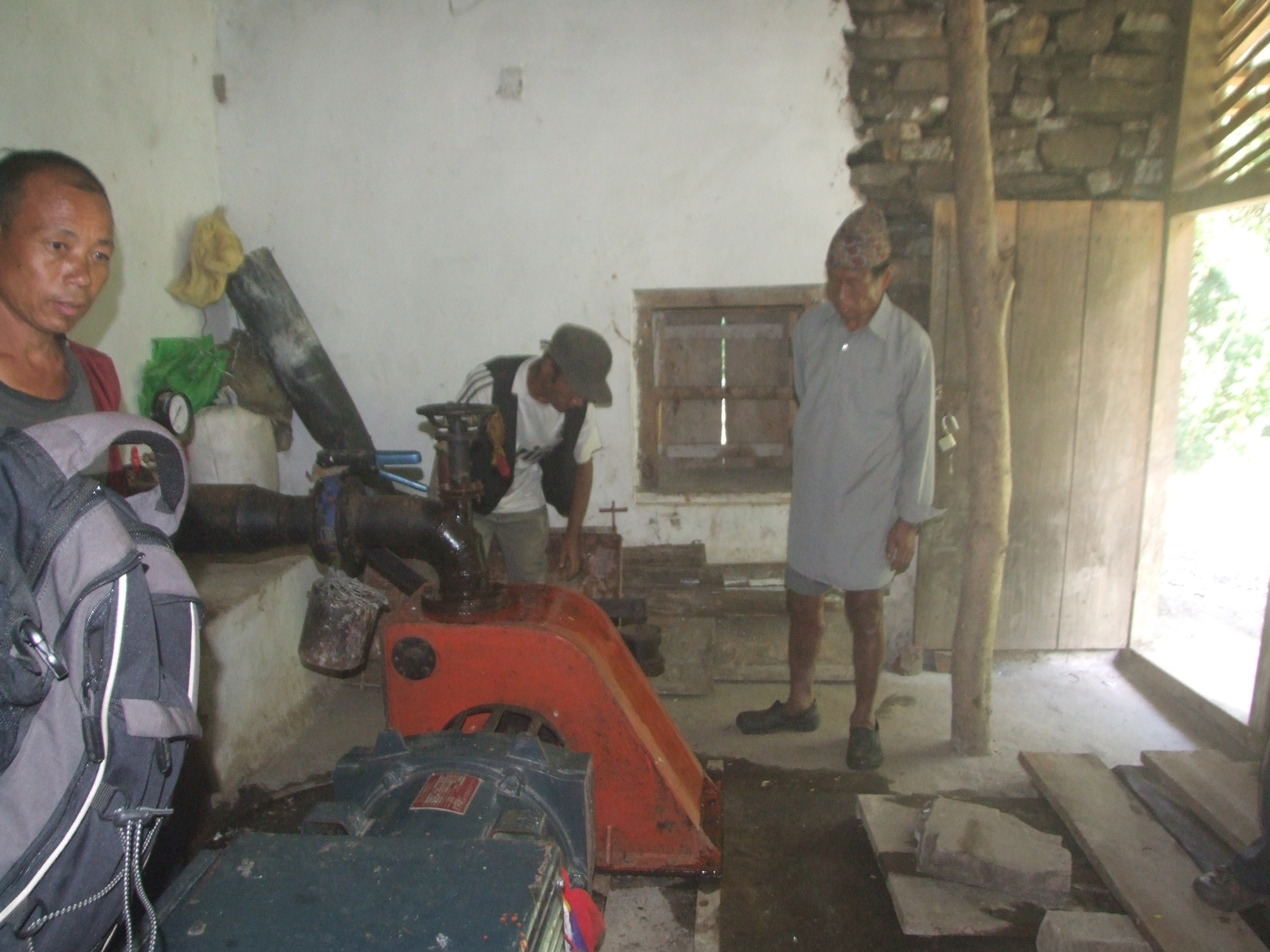
Powerhouse

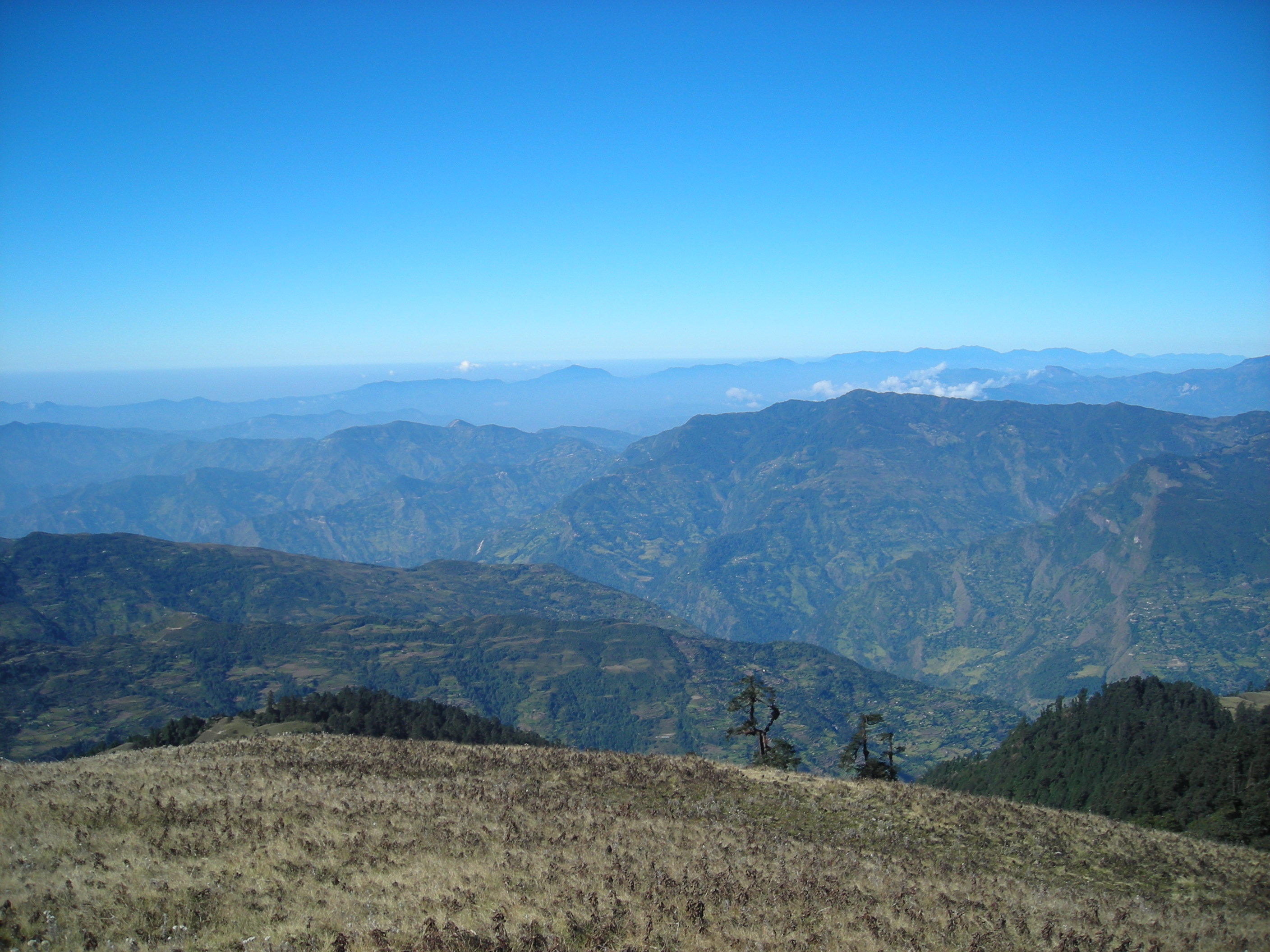
Tholedemba

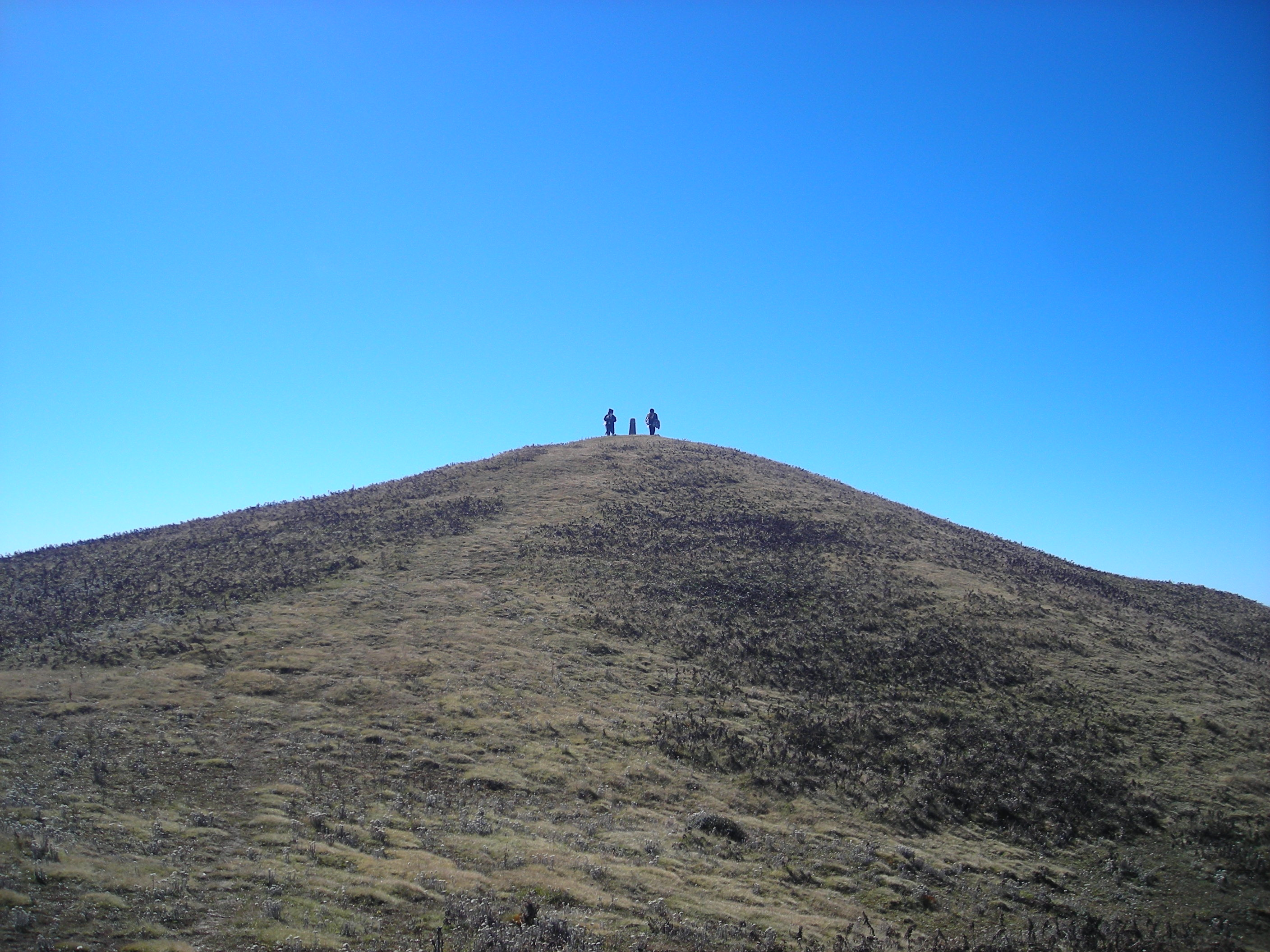
Tholedemba
