= Siddharthanagar =

Siddhārthanagar सिद्धार्थनगर Bhairahawa (भैरहवा)
- Municipality (नगरपालिका)
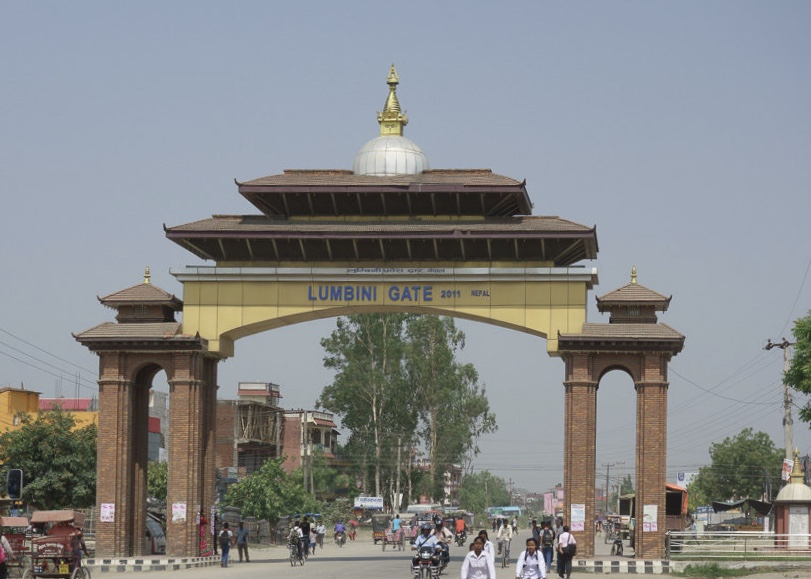
- Lumbini Gate, Bhairahawa
- Interactive map of Siddhārthanagar
- Location in Nepal
- Coordinates: 27°30′N 83°27′E
- Country: Nepal
- Province: Lumbini
- District: Rupandehi
- Incorporated: 1967

Government
  - Type: Mayor–council
  - Mayor: Ishtiyak Ahmad Khan (NC)
  - Deputy Mayor: Uma Adhikari (CPN (UML))
  - Chief Administrator Officer: Nabaraj Poudyal

Area
  - Total: 36.03 km^{2} (13.91 sq mi)

Population (2021)
  - Total: 74,436
  - Density: 2,066/km^{2} (5,350/sq mi)

Language
  - Official: Nepali
- Time zone: UTC+5:45 (NST)
- Postal code: 32900
- Area code: 071
- International Airport: Gautam Buddha International Airport
- Website: www.siddharthanagarmun.gov.np/ne

Siddharthanagar (Nepali: सिद्धार्थनगर), formerly and colloquially still called Bhairahawa (Nepali: भैरहवा), is a municipality and the administrative headquarter of Rupandehi District in Lumbini Province of Nepal, 265 km (165 mi) west of Nepal's capital Kathmandu. It is the closest city to Lumbini, the birthplace of Gautama Buddha, which is located 25 km (16 mi) to the west. The city borders the Indian city of Sonauli in Maharajganj district of Uttar Pradesh.

Although the current name was first used in 1977, many still refer to it as Bhairahawa.

== History and etymology ==
The city was founded as Bhairahawa in 1967. The city's current name Siddharthanagar derives from Buddha's given name Siddhartha, as the birthplace of Buddha is located only 25 km (16 mi) to the west. The name was changed to Siddhartanagar in 1977 AD by poet Komal Dutta Tiwari.

== Climate ==
The highest temperature ever recorded in Siddharthanagar was 45.7 °C (114.3 °F) on 7 June 2023, while the lowest temperature ever recorded was −1.1 °C (30.0 °F) on 20 January 1971.

Climate data for Siddharthanagar (Gautam Buddha Airport) (1991–2020 normals, extremes 1968–present)
Month	Jan	Feb	Mar	Apr	May	Jun	Jul	Aug	Sep	Oct	Nov	Dec	Year
Record high °C (°F)	29.6 (85.3)	35.0 (95.0)	40.2 (104.4)	43.6 (110.5)	45.2 (113.4)	44.8 (112.6)	39.2 (102.6)	38.2 (100.8)	38.7 (101.7)	37.2 (99.0)	35.4 (95.7)	32.4 (90.3)	45.2 (113.4)
Mean daily maximum °C (°F)	20.1 (68.2)	25.4 (77.7)	31.3 (88.3)	36.2 (97.2)	36.6 (97.9)	35.5 (95.9)	33.5 (92.3)	33.7 (92.7)	33.4 (92.1)	32.6 (90.7)	29.1 (84.4)	23.5 (74.3)	30.9 (87.6)
Daily mean °C (°F)	14.4 (57.9)	18.2 (64.8)	23.0 (73.4)	28.2 (82.8)	30.3 (86.5)	30.7 (87.3)	29.9 (85.8)	29.9 (85.8)	29.2 (84.6)	26.6 (79.9)	21.9 (71.4)	16.9 (62.4)	24.9 (76.8)
Mean daily minimum °C (°F)	8.7 (47.7)	10.9 (51.6)	14.7 (58.5)	20.2 (68.4)	23.9 (75.0)	25.9 (78.6)	26.3 (79.3)	26.0 (78.8)	24.9 (76.8)	20.6 (69.1)	14.6 (58.3)	10.2 (50.4)	18.9 (66.0)
Record low °C (°F)	2.0 (35.6)	2.1 (35.8)	6.0 (42.8)	10.0 (50.0)	14.6 (58.3)	17.0 (62.6)	19.0 (66.2)	20.0 (68.0)	19.5 (67.1)	13.4 (56.1)	8.3 (46.9)	3.8 (38.8)	2.0 (35.6)
Average precipitation mm (inches)	20.8 (0.82)	27.8 (1.09)	18.7 (0.74)	30.4 (1.20)	87.6 (3.45)	254.7 (10.03)	497.4 (19.58)	399.7 (15.74)	216.8 (8.54)	65.5 (2.58)	4.9 (0.19)	8.2 (0.32)	1,632.5 (64.27)
Average precipitation days (≥ 1.0 mm)	2.5	2.2	1.7	2.5	6.5	11.9	18.3	16.1	10.9	3.2	0.4	0.5	76.7
Source 1: Department of Hydrology and Meteorology
Source 2: World Meteorological Organization, Meteomanz (extremes)

== Demographics ==
The population of Siddharthanagar in 2001 was 52,569. In 2011 it was 64,566 and in 2021 it was 74,436.

Bhojpuri is spoken by 42.2%, Nepali by 40.7%, Awadhi by 5.9%, Magar by 1.9% and Hindi by 1.9% of the Siddharthnagar municipality population as their first language.

Languages in Siddharthanagar
1. Bhojpuri (42.2%)
2. Nepali (40.7%)
3. Awadhi (5.90%)
4. Magar (1.90%)
5. Hindi (1.90%)
6. Others (7.40%)

== Education ==
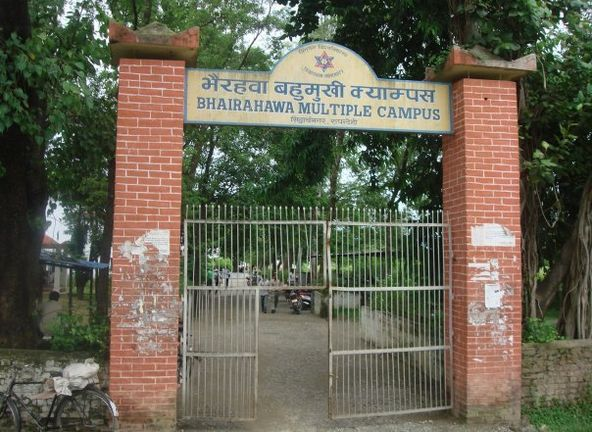
Bhairahawa Multiple Campus, Shantinagar

Rupandehi Lilaram Ma Vi, Bhairahawa Ma Vi, Paklihawa Ma Vi are old higher secondary schools.

There are several higher education facilities in Siddharthanagar including Rupandehi Campus, IAAS Paklihawa Campus, Universal College of Medical Sciences and Bhairahawa Namuna Campus.

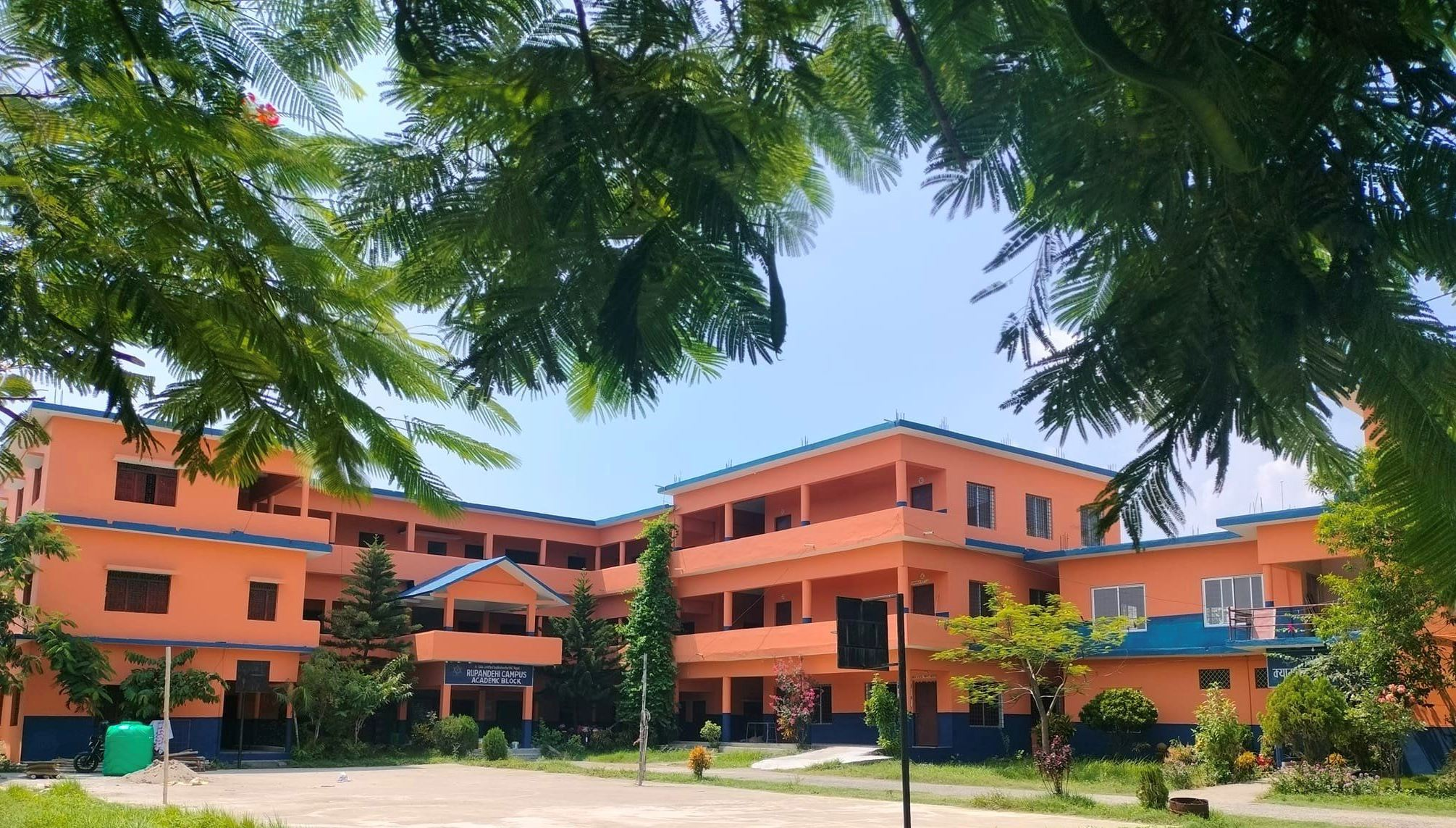
Academic building of Rupandehi Campus.

== See also ==
- Butwal
