= Civil Aviation Authority of Nepal =

Civil Aviation regulatory body in Nepal

Civil Aviation Authority Nepal (CAAN)
- नेपाल नागरिक उड्डयन प्राधिकरण; Nepāl Nāgarik Uḍḍayan Prādhikaraṇ
- Logo of the Civil Aviation Authority of Nepal

Agency overview
- Formed: 31 December 1998; 27 years ago
- Preceding agency: Department of Civil Aviation
- Jurisdiction: Government of Nepal
- Headquarters: Sinamangal, Kathmandu, Nepal
- Annual budget: USD 208.8 million (2026/27)
- Minister responsible: Khadak Raj Paudel, Minister of Culture, Tourism and Civil Aviation
- Agency executive: Mukesh Dangol, Director General of CAAN
- Parent department: Ministry of Culture, Tourism and Civil Aviation
- Child agency: Civil Aviation Academy
- Website: www.caanepal.gov.np

The Civil Aviation Authority of Nepal (CAAN, Nepali: नेपाल नागरिक उड्डयन प्राधिकरण, romanized: Nepāl Nāgarik Uḍḍayan Prādhikaraṇ) is an independent civil aviation regulator. It was established as a Nepali government body in 1998 and is headquartered in Kathmandu.

Before its formation, the functions of the CAAN had been performed since 1957 by an agency within the Ministry of Work, Communications and Transport. On 31 December 1998, as a result of the Civil Aviation Act of 1996, the CAAN was established as an independent regulatory body. It is the board which issues new pilot licenses, renews licenses and convert the licenses through various tests.

The Aircraft Accident and Incident Investigation Division investigates aircraft accidents and incidents. However, as of September 2017, the Government of Nepal is trying to establish an independent aircraft accident investigation unit in order to comply with the International Civil Aviation Organization's regulations. The committee, which is formed after individual accidents is only temporary and often criticized for a lack of results.

There was a minor scandal in September and October 2017, when the Ministry of Culture, Tourism and Civil Aviation transferred the director general of the agency, Sanjiv Gautam, to the ministry itself, which was considered an attempt of sacking him. The Election Commission revoked this move, as it saw a "a breach of the election code of conduct."

The agency's annual report lists the following main tasks:

- Issuance of Airworthiness Certificate and License, Rating and Certificate to aviation personnel
- Safety Oversight of Aviation Service Provider Organizations
- Issuance of Technical Regulations like Civil Aviation Requirements, Directives, Manuals, Advisory Circulars etc.
- Certification of Aerodromes
- Construction, Operations and Management of aerodromes
- Provide Air Navigation Services except Aviation Meteorology
- Advise Government of Nepal on Civil Aviation Matters
