= Air Kasthamandap =

Nepali airline

IATA	ICAO	Call sign
—	—	—
- Founded: 2009
- Ceased operations: 2017
- AOC #: 051/2009
- Hubs: Nepalgunj Airport, Surkhet Airport
- Headquarters: Kathmandu, Nepal
- Key people: Pradeep Shrestha (CEO)

Air Kasthamandap Pvt. Ltd. was an airline based in Nepal which started operations in 2009. It had its headquarters in Kathmandu and operated scheduled and charter flights and cargo flights in Western Nepal.

== History ==
Air Kasthamandap started operations in 2009 with two brand new PAC P-750 XSTOL aircraft. In June 2017, the Civil Aviation Authority of Nepal revoked Air Kasthamandap's Air operator's certificate.

== Destinations ==
Air Kasthamandap regularly served the following destinations on passenger or cargo service.

These were cancelled either at the closure of operations or before:

Destination	Airport	Notes	Refs.
Bajura	Bajura Airport		
Birendranagar	Surkhet Airport	Hub	
Dolpa	Dolpa Airport		
Jumla	Jumla Airport		
Kathmandu	Tribhuvan International Airport		
Lukla	Tenzing-Hillary Airport		
Nepalgunj	Nepalgunj Airport	Hub	
Manthali	Ramechhap Airport		
Rara	Talcha Airport		
Simikot	Simikot Airport		

== Fleet ==
At the time of closure, Air Kasthamandap operated the following aircraft:

Air Kasthamandap fleet
Aircraft	In fleet	Notes
PAC P-750 XSTOL	3	

== Accidents and incidents ==
- 2016 Air Kasthamandap PAC 750XL crash - On 26 February 2016, an Air Kasthamandap PAC 750XL aircraft with eleven people on board crashed at Chilkhaya in Kalikot District, Nepal, killing two crew members and injuring all nine passengers on board.
