= Tara Air =

Nepalese airline

IATA	ICAO	Call sign
TB (Note: Tara Air has no registered IATA code allocated, but uses 'TB' (as an official IATA code would be used). However, officially, the IATA Code 'TB' is allocated to a Belgium airline TUI Airlines Belgium N.V dba TUI fly.)	TRA (Note: Tara Air has no registered ICAO code allocated, but uses 'TRA' on scheduling, ticketing and baggage (as an official ICAO code would be used). However, officially, the ICAO Code 'TRA' is allocated to Transavia.)	TARA AIR
- Founded: 2009; 17 years ago
- Hubs: Tribhuvan International Airport
- Secondary hubs: Nepalgunj Airport; Pokhara Airport
- Fleet size: 3
- Destinations: 7
- Parent company: Yeti Airlines
- Headquarters: Kathmandu, Nepal
- Key people: Ang Tshering Sherpa, Founder
- Website: www.taraair.com

Tara Air Pvt. Ltd. is an airline headquartered in Kathmandu, Nepal. It is a subsidiary of the Nepalese Yeti Airlines. Tara Air was formed in 2009 using aircraft from the Yeti Airlines fleet and is based at Tribhuvan International Airport, with a secondary hub at Nepalgunj Airport. The airline operates scheduled flights and air charter services with a fleet of STOL aircraft, previously provided by Yeti Airlines. Its operations focus on serving remote and mountainous airports and airstrips. It is currently on the List of airlines banned in the European Union.

== History ==
Tara Air was formed in 2009 when Yeti Airlines split its STOL aircraft operations from its regional operations. The airline's STOL operations were rebranded as Tara Air and focused on providing services into remote and mountainous airports and airstrips.

== Destinations ==
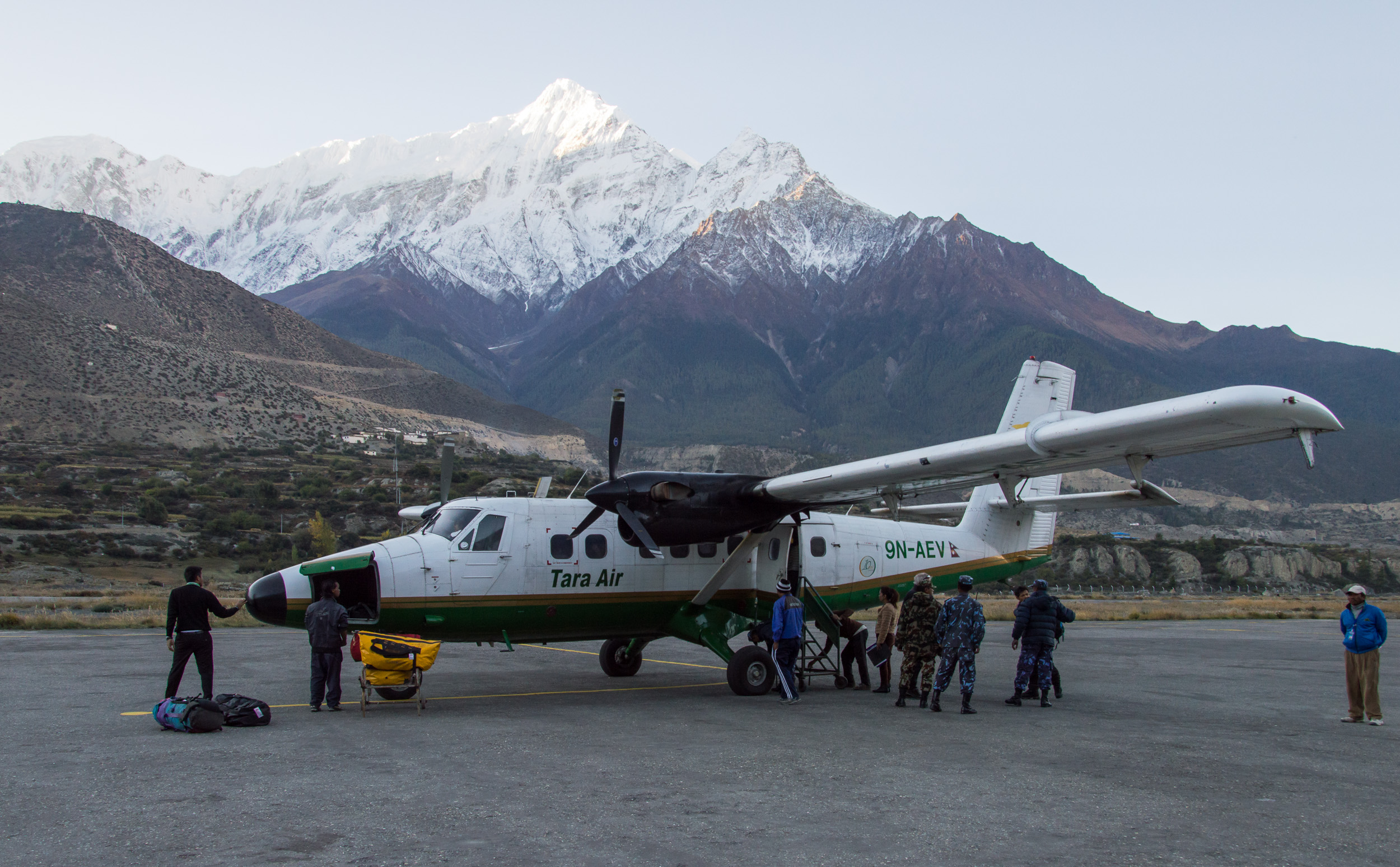
Tara Air DHC-6 Twin Otter at Jomsom Airport

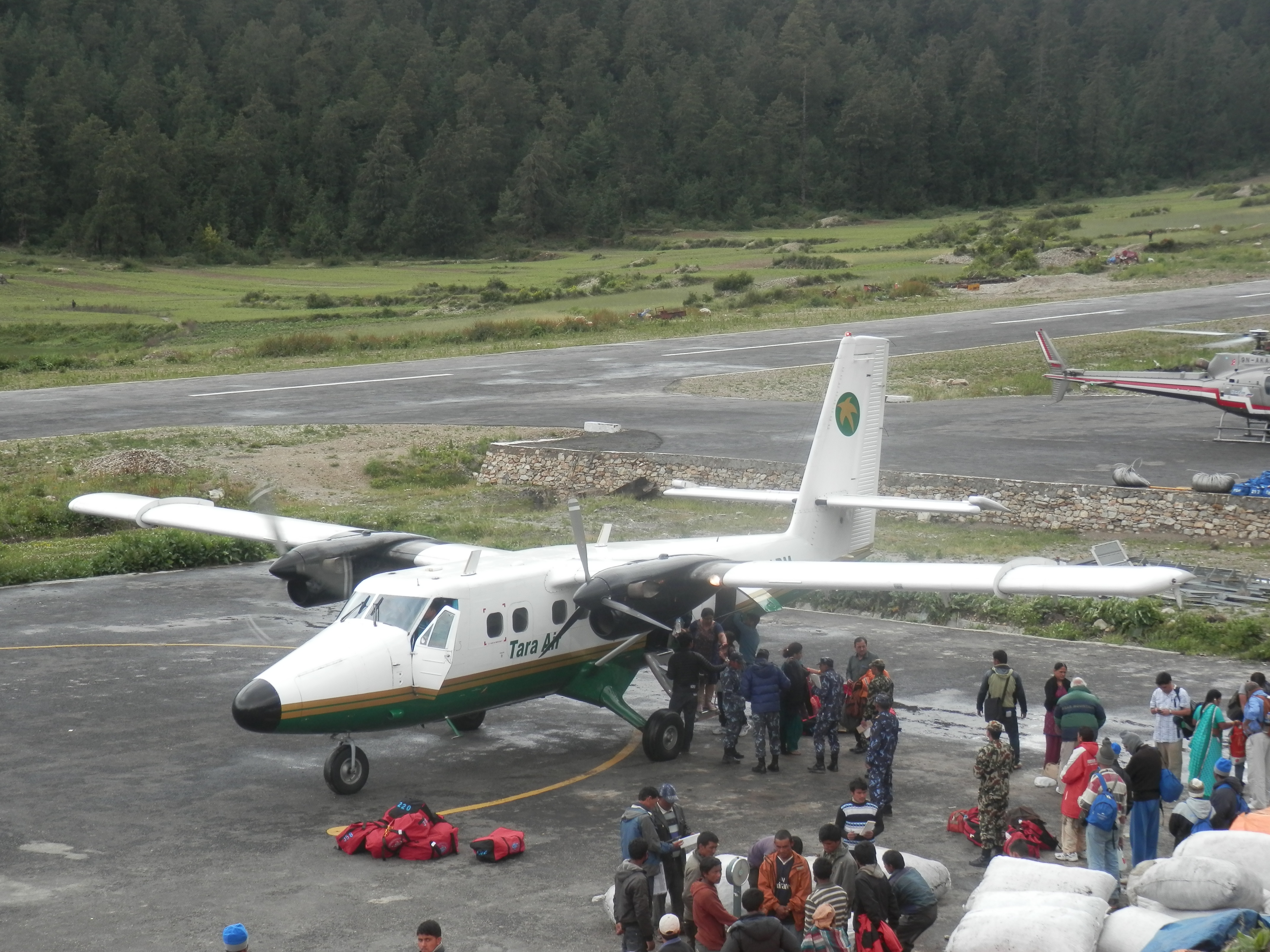
Tara Air DHC-6 Twin Otter at Simikot Airport

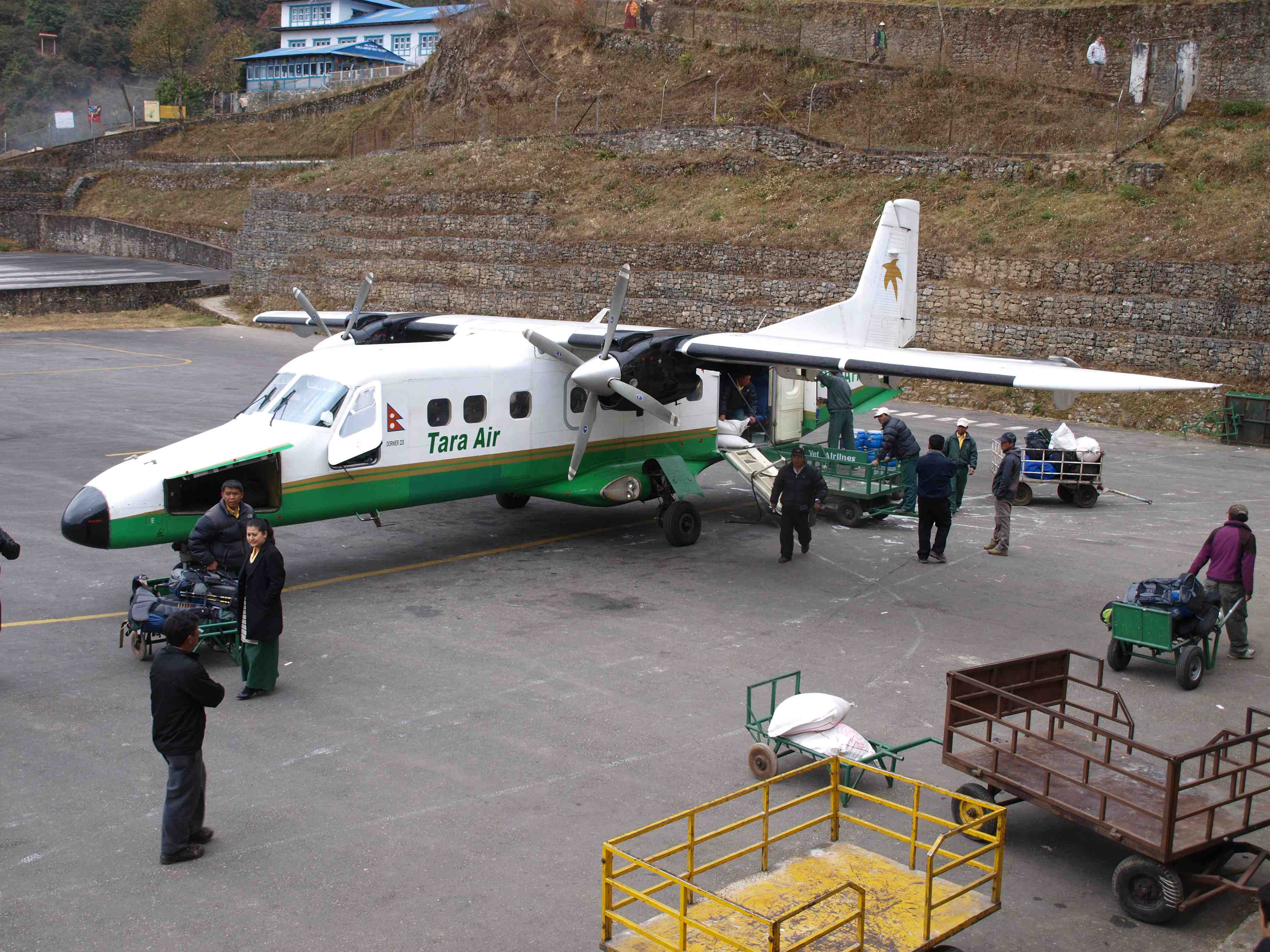
Tara Air Dornier 228 at Tenzing-Hillary Airport

The airline operates scheduled domestic flights to a number of destinations as well as offering air charter services. Tara Air operates daily scheduled flights between Kathmandu and Lukla, and between Jomsom and Pokhara. Other destinations are served at varying frequency.

Destination	Airport	Notes	Refs.
Kathmandu	Tribhuvan International Airport	Hub	
Nepalgunj	Nepalgunj Airport	Focus city	
Pokhara	Pokhara Airport	Focus city	
Bajhang	Bajhang Airport	Terminated	
Bajura	Bajura Airport	Terminated	
Bhojpur	Bhojpur Airport	Terminated	
Birendranagar	Surkhet Airport	Terminated	
Bowang	Dhorpatan Airport	Terminated	
Diktel	Khanidanda Airport	Terminated	
Dolpa	Dolpa Airport		
Jiri	Jiri Airport	Terminated	
Jomsom	Jomsom Airport		
Jumla	Jumla Airport		
Lukla	Tenzing-Hillary Airport		
Lamidanda	Lamidanda Airport	Terminated	
Langtang	Langtang Airport	Terminated	
Manang	Manang Airport	Terminated	
Manthali	Ramechhap Airport		
Phaplu	Phaplu Airport		
Rara	Talcha Airport		
Rumjatar	Rumjatar Airport	Terminated	
Rukum	Rukumkot Airport	Terminated	
Rukum	Rukum Salle Airport	Terminated	
Sanphebagar	Sanphebagar Airport	Terminated	
Simikot	Simikot Airport		
Syangboche	Syangboche Airport	Terminated	

=== Codeshare agreements ===
Tara Air has a codeshare agreement with its parent company Yeti Airlines.

== Fleet ==
As of August 2025, Tara Air operates the following aircraft:

Tara Air fleet
Aircraft	In Fleet	Orders	Passengers			Notes
Aircraft	In Fleet	Orders	C	Y	Total	Notes
de Havilland Canada DHC-6-300 Twin Otter	1	—	0	19	19	
de Havilland Canada DHC-6-400 Twin Otter	2	—	0	18	18	
Total	3	—				

== Accidents and incidents ==
Tara Air has been considered one of the "most unsafe airlines" due to several significant incidents.

- On 26 May 2010, a DHC-6 Twin Otter took off from Birendranagar Airport in Surkhet heading for Talcha Airport in Rara with 18 passengers and 3 crew on board. At 10 am the aircraft had to make an emergency landing at Birendranagar Airport after its cabin door suddenly opened five minutes after take-off. Tara Air officials said that the cabin attendant managed to lock the door immediately after it opened to avert any possible mishaps.
- On 15 December 2010, a DHC-6 Twin Otter crashed shortly after takeoff from Lamidanda Airport in Nepal; it was en route to Kathmandu. All 19 passengers and 3 flight crew were killed.
- On 23 June 2011, a Tara Air Dornier 228 was substantially damaged in a heavy landing and runway excursion at Simikot Airport, Nepal. The aircraft was operating a cargo flight from Nepalgunj Airport.
- On 21 September 2012, a DHC-6 Twin Otter en route from Dolpa to Nepalgunj was damaged during takeoff when the pilot lost directional control. No one was hurt in the incident.
- On 24 February 2016, Tara Air Flight 193 went missing shortly after takeoff whilst traveling to Pokhara-Jomsom. It was later found that the aircraft crashed into the mountainous northern region killing 23 people including 2 babies and 3 crew members.
- On 22 April 2019, a Tara Air Dornier 228 aircraft skidded off the runway upon landing at Ramechhap Airport. Due to adverse weather, the flight from Tribhuvan International Airport to Lukla Airport was diverted to Ramechhap Airport. All of the crew and passengers evacuated the aircraft safely.
- On 1 December 2021, a Tara Air DHC-6 Twin Otter aircraft had a tyre burst upon landing at Bajura Airport. While no one was injured, a video of passengers pushing the aircraft off the runway, as there was no suitable vehicle at the airport, went viral.
- On 29 May 2022, Tara Air Flight 197 lost contact with ATC 12 minutes after takeoff from Pokhara Airport. The wreckage was found 20 hours later on the side of a mountain in Sanosware, Mustang District; none of the 22 on board survived.
