= Makalu Air =

Airlines

IATA	ICAO	Call sign
–	–	Makalu Air
- Founded: 2009
- AOC #: 057/2009
- Hubs: Surkhet Airport
- Secondary hubs: Nepalgunj Airport
- Fleet size: 1
- Headquarters: Sinamangal, Kathmandu, Nepal
- Key people: Capt. Phizo Nath (Executive Chairman); Aditya Nath Nepal (Managing Director)
- Website: www.makaluair.com

Makalu Air Pvt. Ltd is an airline based in Nepalgunj, Nepal. The company was established in 2009 and was issued an air operator's certificate by the Civil Aviation Authority of Nepal. Makalu Air provides chartered passenger and cargo services. It is banned from flying in the EU

== Destinations ==
The airline serves the following destinations:

Destination	Airport	Notes
Birendranagar	Surkhet Airport	Hub
Nepalgunj	Nepalgunj Airport	Hub
Bajura	Bajura Airport	
Dolpa	Dolpa Airport	
Jumla	Jumla Airport	
Rara	Talcha Airport	
Simikot	Simikot Airport	

== Fleet ==
The Makalu Air fleet consists of the following aircraft (as of August 2018):

Air Dynasty fleet
Aircraft	In fleet	Orders	Passengers			Notes
Aircraft	In fleet	Orders	C	Y	Total	Notes
Cessna 208B Grand Caravan	1	0	0	9	9	

== Accidents and incidents ==
- On 21 November 2011 a Makalu Air Cessna 208B Grand Caravan took off from Surkhet, en route to Talcha. Upon touchdown at Talcha, the aircraft skidded off the runway and hit a rock, damaging the front of the aircraft. Four of the 11 occupants were injured.
- On 4 August 2016 a Makalu Air Cessna 208B Grand Caravan took off from Simikot, en route to Surkhet. After experiencing engine failure whilst climbing, the aircraft was forced to land in the Karnali river. Both pilots survived uninjured.
- On 16 May 2018 a Makalu Air Cessna 208B Grand Caravan, operating a cargo flight, took off for Simikot, from Surkhet. The aircraft crashed near Simikot pass. Neither of the two pilots survived.

== See also ==
- List of airlines of Nepal
