= Flying Dragon Airlines =

IATA	ICAO	Call sign
—	—	—
- Commenced operations: 2005
- Ceased operations: 2006
- AOC #: 043/2005
- Operating bases: Nepalgunj Airport
- Fleet size: 2
- Destinations: 9
- Parent company: China Flying Dragon Aviation
- Headquarters: Nepalgunj, Nepal
- Key people: Qin Yubao (Managing Director)

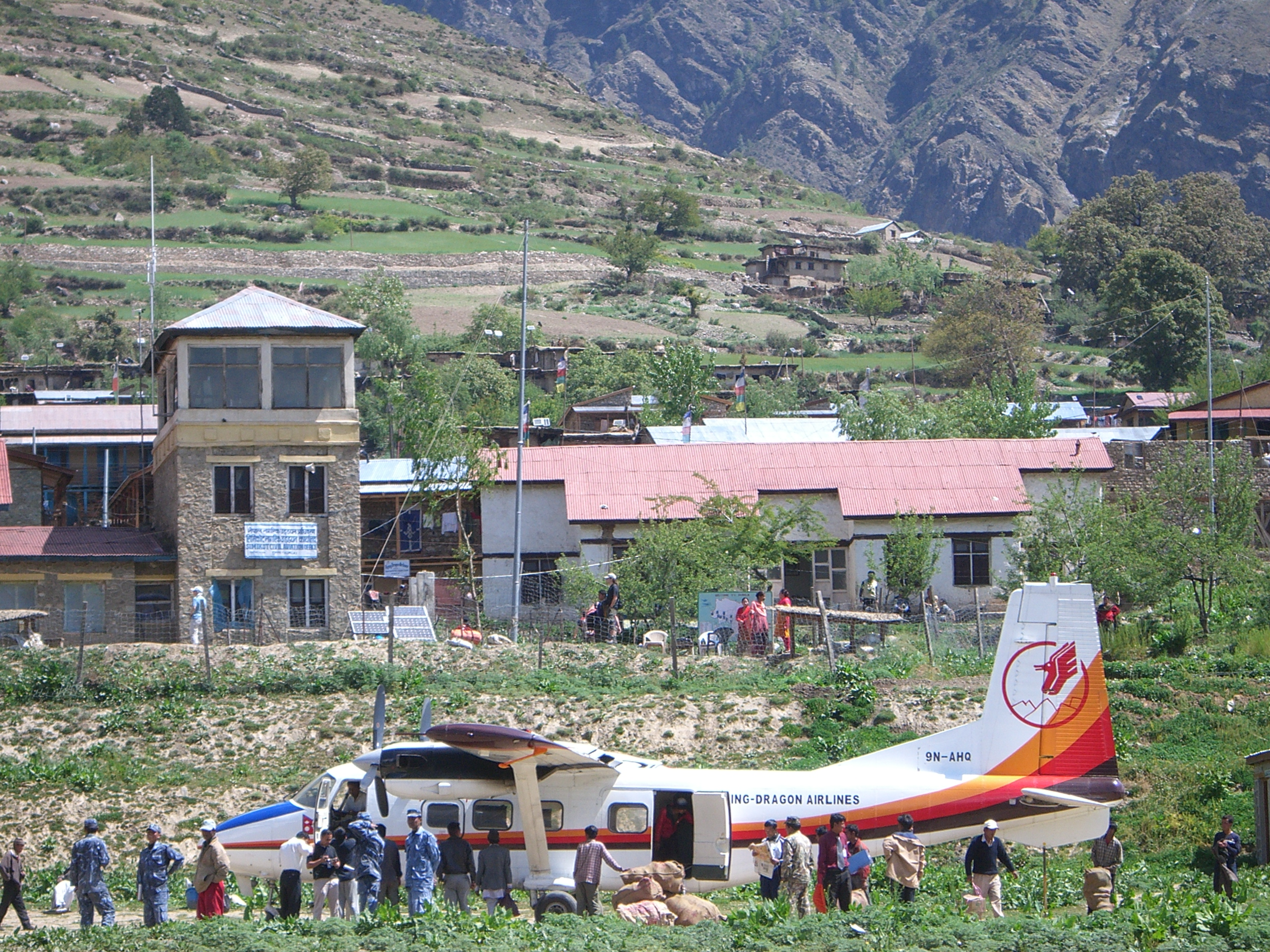
Flying Dragon Airlines Harbin Y-12 at Simikot Airport

Flying Dragon Airlines was a Nepalese airline based in Nepalgunj operating domestic services out of Nepalgunj Airport.

== History ==
The Civil Aviation Authority of Nepal granted Flying Dragon Airlines an air operators certificate in June 2005. The airline was required to be based in Nepalgunj and carry out operations in the Mid- and Far-Western development regions.

Chinese aviation company China Flying Dragon Aviation, based in Harbin, owned 49% of Flying Dragon Airlines. The airline was due to launch in September 2005, using Y-12 17-seater dual passenger/cargo aircraft.

== Destinations ==
Flying Dragon Airlines regularly served the following destinations on passenger or cargo service. These were cancelled either at the closure of operations or before:

Destination	Airport	Notes	Refs.
Birendranagar	Surkhet Airport		
Dolpa	Dolpa Airport		
Jomsom	Jomsom Airport		
Jumla	Jumla Airport		
Kathmandu	Tribhuvan International Airport		
Lukla	Tenzing-Hillary Airport		
Nepalgunj	Nepalgunj Airport	Hub	
Rukum	Rukumkot Airport		
Simikot	Simikot Airport		

== Fleet ==
At the time of closure, Flying Dragon Airlines operated the following aircraft:

Flying Dragon Airlines fleet
Aircraft	In fleet	Orders	Notes
Harbin Y-12	2	1	
