= 2016 Air Kasthamandap PAC 750XL crash =

2016 aviation accident in Nepal

2016 Air Kasthamandap crash
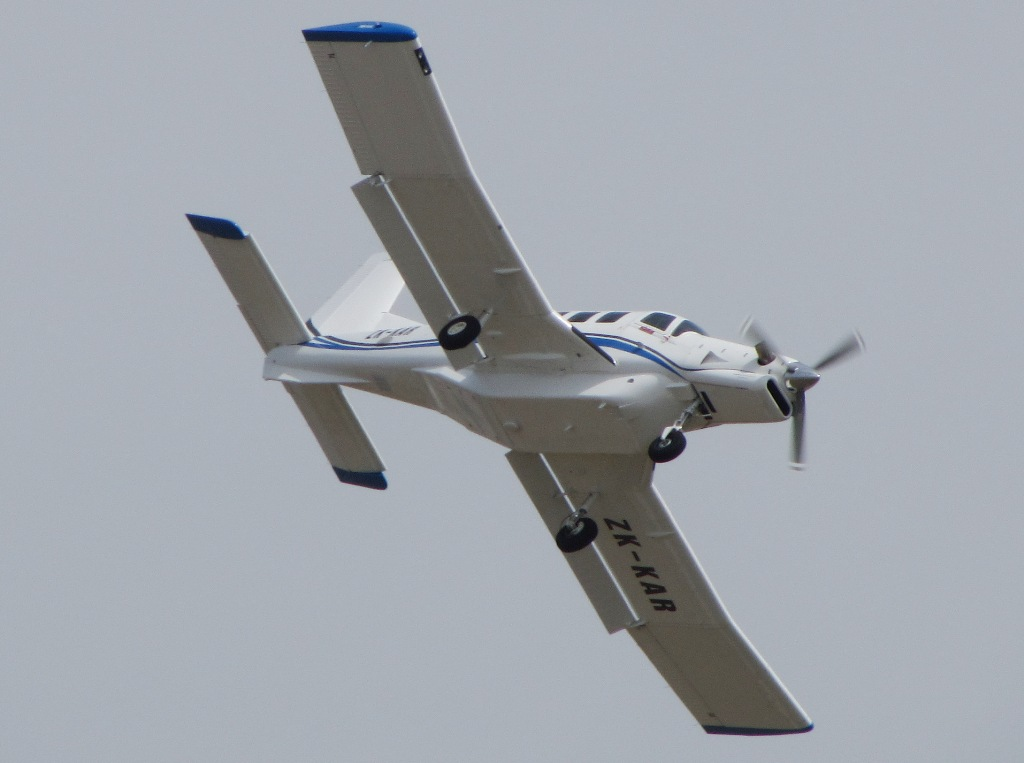
- A PAC 750XL similar to the aircraft involved

Accident
- Date: 26 February 2016
- Summary: engine failure due to poor maintenance
- Site: Chilkhaya, Kalikot district, Nepal; 29°5′N 81°52′E

Aircraft
- Aircraft type: PAC 750XL
- Operator: Air Kasthamandap
- Registration: 9N-AJB
- Flight origin: Nepalgunj Airport, Nepalgunj, Nepal
- Destination: Jumla Airport, Jumla, Nepal
- Occupants: 11
- Passengers: 9
- Crew: 2
- Fatalities: 2
- Injuries: 9
- Survivors: 9

On 26 February 2016, an Air Kasthamandap PAC 750XL passenger aircraft with eleven people on board crashed at Chilkhaya in Kalikot district, Nepal, killing the two crew members and injuring all nine passengers on board. The accident occurred just two days after Tara Air Flight 193.

== Aircraft ==
The aircraft involved in the crash was a PAC 750XL operated by Air Kasthamandap. It was delivered to the airline brand new in 2009.

== Accident ==
The aircraft was forced to make an emergency landing. The pilot gave a warning to the passengers before landing in a field. The forward fuselage was reported to have been crushed.

== Crew and Passengers ==
The victims were identified as First Officer Santosh Rana and Captain Dinesh Neupane. Rana was the son of Nepal's Minister of Land Reform and Management, CPN-UML central leader, and lawmaker Dal Bahadur Rana. There were nine passengers on board including an infant, all of which sustained injuries.

== Aftermath ==
Initial reports indicate that the crew were trying to make an emergency landing due to a technical problem.

Prime Minister Khadga Prasad Sharma Oli expressed condolences to the families of crew members killed in the incident.

Shortly after the accident, the Civil Aviation Authority of Nepal stated that it had only allowed single engine aircraft to operate on chartered, not regular flights. Following the accident, the Civil Aviation Authority of Nepal forbid airlines to operate passenger flights on single engine aircraft.

== Investigation ==
One day after the accident, the Government of Nepal formed a committee to investigate the accident. The report, released in September 2016 found that an engine failure caused the emergency landing on a field. The landing gear was caught in a pile of firewood, leading the aircraft to impact on the ground. The cockpit was thereafter destroyed. The engine was built in 1991 and installed on the aircraft in 2015. The report found that financial difficulties caused the airline to neglect the aircraft's maintenance.
