= Nepalese Army Air Service =

Nepali Army Air Service
- नेपाली सैनिक हवाई सेवा
- Nepali Army Air Service roundel
- Founded: 1965
- Country: Nepal
- Type: Army aviation
- Size: ~1000, 25 aircraft in service, 6 on order
- Part of: Nepalese Armed Forces
- Garrison/HQ: Kathmandu
- Engagements: Nepalese Civil War
- Website: nepalarmy.mil.np

Insignia
- Roundel

- Fin flash

Aircraft flown
- Attack helicopter: Eurocopter AS550, HAL Cheetah
- Cargo helicopter: Mil Mi-171
- Utility helicopter: Bell 407, AgustaWestland AW139, Eurocopter AS550, HAL Dhruv, Bell 412, Bell 206
- Trainer: Piper PA-28 Cherokee
- Transport: BN-2 Islander, IPTN CN-235, M28 Skytruck

The Nepali Army Air Service (Nepali: नेपाली सैनिक हवाई सेवा, romanized: Nēpālī sainika hawai sēvā) is the army aviation branch of the Nepalese Armed Forces, also known as the Nepal Army Air Wing (formerly Royal Nepalese Air Force). Nepal has no separate air force but the Nepali Army operates several aircraft within the army aviation branch.

== History ==
The Nepali Army Air Service (NAAS) was formed in the 1960s but became an air force unit in 1979. It is now again a part of the Army. It has limited air combat capabilities as only a few helicopters can be armed. The main objective of this flying element is transport, flying paratroopers and aid in case of an emergency (e.g. natural disasters). Apart from the 11th Brigade, the country has established a VIP Flight from Tribhuvan Airport, mostly the aircraft are stationed at Kathmandu, Surkhet, and Dipayal.

From 1996 to 2006, the country was gripped by a civil war against Communist Party of Nepal rebels who strove to overthrow the constitutional monarchy and establish a republic. Their attacks increased after the 2001 massacre of the royal family. This development led to the need for armed helicopters. Several types of aircraft have entered service since: MI-17s, M28 Skytruck, HAL Lancer and HAL Dhruv. The UK delivered two Britten-Norman Islanders and two MI-17s free of charge. China decided to supply an MA-60 (a Y-7 derivative). Nepal also purchased HAL Cheetah and HAL Chetak helicopters.

In November 2014, India donated an HAL Dhruv as part of a strategic pact.

The NAAS consists of about 1000 members.

== Aircraft ==
As of 30 August 2025

Aircraft	Origin	Type	Variant	In service	Notes
Trainer aircraft
Piper PA-28 Cherokee	United States	Trainer	—	2	Used for pilot training
Transport
BN-2 Islander	United Kingdom	Utility / Transport	—	1	Light transport duties
IPTN CN-235	Indonesia	Transport	—	1	Medium tactical transport
M28 Skytruck	Poland	Utility / Transport/ Air Ambulance	—	5	
Helicopters
Bell 407	United States	Utility / Reconnaissance	—	1	4 on order expected delivery on 2030 donated by usa
AgustaWestland AW139	Italy	Utility / SAR	—	2	Search & rescue operations / VIP Transport
Eurocopter AS550	France	Utility / Light Attack	—	2	Reconnaissance & liaison
HAL Cheetah	India	Attack / Utility	HAL Lancer	2	High-altitude operations
HAL Dhruv	India	Utility / SAR	—	1	Multirole helicopter
Mil Mi-171	Russia	Transport / Multi Mission	Mi-171	4	Multi-mission Gun-Ship
Bell 412	United States	Utility / Transport	—	0	2 on order that will be in service by mid 2027 (Future delivery)
Bell 206	United States	Utility / Reconnaissance	—	2	Light utility helicopters

== Army pilot training school ==
The Nepali Army Air Service has had its flying and helicopter pilot training school since 2004 within the No 11 Brigade and is the only helicopter pilot training school in Nepal. The school provides training using Mi-17, Bell and Ecureuil helicopters.

In 2019, the Nepal Army purchased two Piper Archer DX training aircraft. In addition, the army is planning to start an airplane pilot training school within the army. This will be the first aviation school to offer training within Nepal. This is a significant step because Nepal Army officer cadets previously had to go to Bangladesh and India and Philippines for aviation courses. With the new training school, the Nepal Army can provide aviation training to officer cadets in the country itself. It is unclear whether the Nepal Army aviation school will be accessible to civilians in the near future.

== Accidents and incidents ==
- On 27 February 1970, a Nepalese Royal Flight de Havilland Canada DHC-6 Twin Otter crashed while taking off at Jomsom Airport killing one passenger. Three passengers and one crew member survived but the plane was written off.
- On 13 September 1972, a Royal Nepalese Air Force Douglas DC-3 crashed when it hit a high tension powerline during a flight in Panchkhal. All 31 occupants of the aircraft were killed.
- On 30 December 1985, a Nepal Army Air Wing Short SC.7 Skyvan crashed in jungle near Dhangadi killing all 25 soldiers aboard.
- On 10 July 1991, a Nepal Army Air Wing de Havilland Twin Otter en route from Surkhet to Jumla was destroyed, killing 3 people, when hit a hillside. Later analysis showed the altimeter had given an incorrect reading.
- On 18 October 2011, a Nepal Army Air Wing Britten-Norman BN-2 Islander performing an ambulance flight from Nepalgunj to Kathmandu crashed near Dhorpatan, Baglung District and caught fire. None of the six occupants survived the accident.
- On 30 May 2017, a Nepal Army Air Wing PZL M28 Skytruck (Registration NA-048) crashed at Bajura Airport while the pilot was undertaking a forced landing due to bad weather. The cargo airplane was supposed to land at Simikot Airport in Humla District. However, bad weather condition forced the pilot to divert towards Bajura. The pilot died and two others were injured.
