= Sita Air =

Nepalese airline

IATA	ICAO	Call sign
ST	STA (Note: Sita Air has no registered ICAO code allocated, but uses 'STA' on scheduling, ticketing and baggage (as an official ICAO code would be used). However, officially, the ICAO Code 'STA' is allocated to Star Aviation UK.)	-
- Founded: 2000; 26 years ago
- Hubs: Tribhuvan International Airport
- Secondary hubs: Pokhara Airport, Nepalgunj Airport
- Fleet size: 4
- Destinations: 13
- Headquarters: Sinamangal, Kathmandu, Nepal
- Key people: Venkatesh Mundara Chairman/Managing Director; Narayan Prasad Mundara Director
- Website: www.sitaair.com.np

Sita Air is an airline based in Kathmandu, Nepal, operating domestic services within Nepal. It was established in 2003. The airline's main base is Tribhuvan International Airport with hubs at Pokhara Airport and Nepalgunj Airport. As of 2026 it is banned from flying in the EU.

== History ==
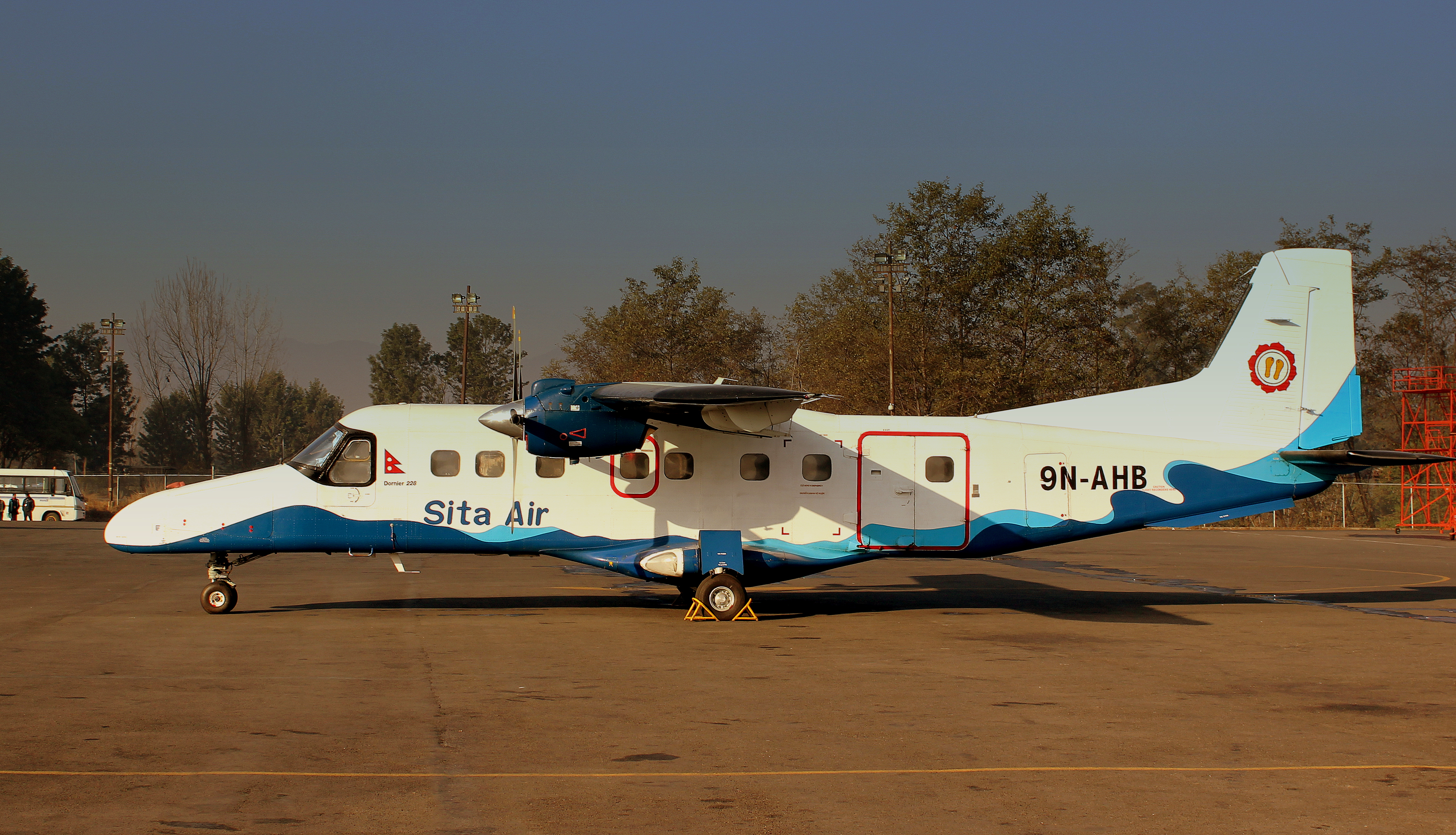
Sita Air Dornier 228 parked at Tribhuvan International Airport (February 2013)

The airline received its air operators certificate in 2000, and was established in October 2000, but was unable to operate until 2003 due to political unrest in Nepal. Operations started on 6 February 2003 with a single Dornier 228; a second aircraft was added in April 2003.

In August 2014, the Civil Aviation Authority of Nepal barred the airline from carrying passengers due to safety concerns and failing to meet international standards. The airline was allowed to continue operating cargo flights. However, by 2016, the airline was allowed to operate passenger services again.

In 2016, the airline was sold to Biratnagar-based Agrawal Group for NPRs 550,000,000.

In 2017, Sita Air bought two more Dornier 228 aircraft from Simrik Airlines.

== Destinations ==
Sita Air currently operates services to the following domestic destinations (as of May 2019):

City	Airport	Notes	Refs
Bajura	Bajura Airport		
Chainpur	Bajhang Airport	Terminated	
Chandannath	Jumla Airport		
Chaurjahari	Chaurjahari Airport	Terminated	
Dhangadhi	Dhangadhi Airport	Terminated	
Janakpur	Janakpur Airport	Terminated	
Jomsom	Jomsom Airport		
Juphal	Dolpa Airport		
Kathmandu	Tribhuvan International Airport	Hub	
Lukla	Tenzing–Hillary Airport		
Manthali	Ramechhap Airport	Seasonal	
Nepalgunj	Nepalgunj Airport		
Phaplu	Phaplu Airport	Seasonal	
Pokhara	Pokhara Airport		
Rara	Talcha Airport		
Simikot	Simikot Airport		
Tulsipur	Dang Airport	Terminated	
Tumlingtar	Tumlingtar Airport	Seasonal	

== Fleet ==
As of August 2025, Sita Air operates the following aircraft:

Sita Air fleet
Aircraft	In service	Orders	Passengers			Notes
Aircraft	In service	Orders	P	Y	Total	Notes
Dornier 228	4	—	0	19	19	9N-AHA written off as Sita Air Flight 601
Total	4	—				

== Accidents and incidents ==
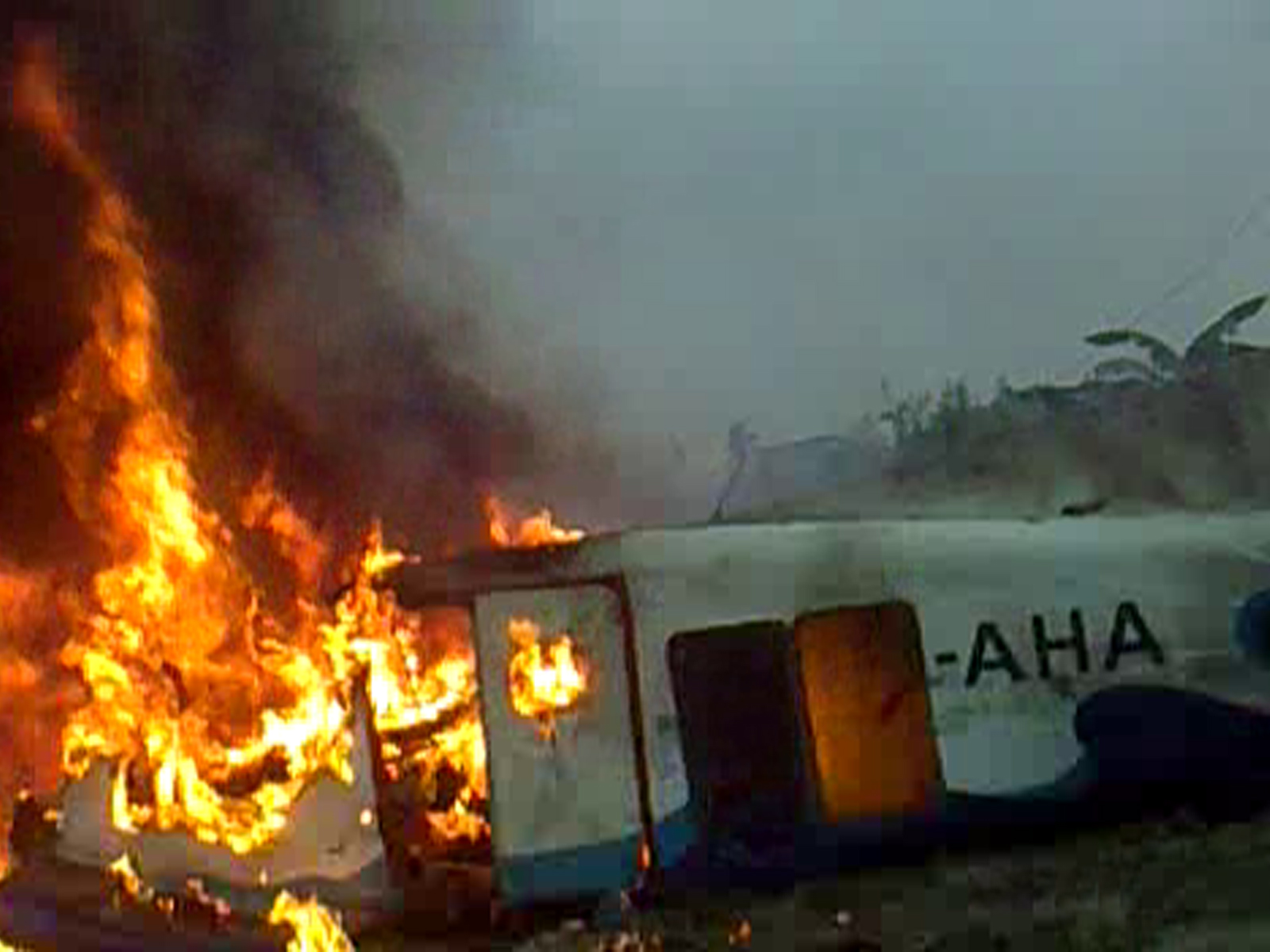
Wreckage of Flight 601 immediately after impact

- On 30 September 2004, a Sita Air Dornier 228 crashlanded at Lukla Airport, causing the airport to be closed for several days.
- On 12 October 2010, a Sita Air Dornier 228 hit a wall beside the runway in Lukla Airport as its brake system did not work properly. The engine inlet of the aircraft was damaged heavily. The aircraft was attempting to land at Lukla airport. It was lifted by helicopter to Kathmandu for repairs and put back to service. This same aircraft went on to have another crash landing accident on Simkot Airport in 2013.
- On 28 September 2012, Sita Air Flight 601, a Dornier 228 crashed just after takeoff from Tribhuvan International Airport. All 16 passengers and three crew on board were killed. The flight was bound for Lukla. An investigation into the crash concluded that it was caused by passenger and cargo payload that exceeded the aircraft's maximum takeoff weight.
- On 1 June 2013, a Sita Air Dornier 228 sustained substantial damage upon landing accident at Simikot Airport. There were no injuries among the five passengers and two crew members. The left hand main landing gear broke and the Dornier 228 came to rest on the side of the runway. The no. 1 propeller, left wing and underside of the fuselage sustained substantial damage. The aircraft had to be airlifted to Kathmandu by a helicopter.
- On 23 April 2017, Sita Air Flight 617, a Dornier 228 met a minor incident at Phaplu Airport. The wing tip of theaircraft of was damaged as the aircraft hit the wall on the apron at Phaplu Airport.
- On 20 February 2018, Sita Air Flight 601, a Dornier 228 was forced to make an emergency diversion after the aircraft experienced abnormal pressure reading on the engine during the flight to Lukla from Kathmandu which forced the flight crew to carry out the precautionary engine shutdown procedure, shutting down the right engine.
