= Jumla =

Jumla may refer to:

- Mir Jumla II (1591–1663), subahdar of Bengal
- Jumla District, one of the seventy-seven districts of Nepal
  - Jumla (town), seat of Jumla District
    - Jumla Airport, the airport in the town of Jumla
- Jamla, a village in southern Syria near Golan Heights

== See also ==
- Joomla
