= Rachama =

Mountain peak in Nepal

- Location within Nepal Location within Ngari Location within China Location within Asia

Highest point
- Elevation: 6,594 m (21,634 ft)
- Prominence: 932 m (3,058 ft)
- Coordinates: 30°08′36.78″N 82°11′54.74″E

Naming
- Native name: रचमा

Geography
- Country: Nepal
- Parent range: Himalayas

Rachama (also known as Lachama Chuli) is a mountain peak in the Himalayas on the border between Nepal and the Tibet Autonomous Region of China.

== Location ==
The peak, at 6,594 m (21,634 ft) above sea level, is located on the border of Nepal's Karnali Province and China's Ngari Prefecture. Its prominence is 932 m (3,058 ft). Simikot Airport in the Humla District of Nepal, just 43 km southwest of the peak, provides access.

Rachama and its surrounding area are part of an extensive study on Little Ice Age glaciers. As of July 2017, scientists from the Chinese Academy of Sciences had investigated and researched six of these glaciers.
