= 2010 Tara Air DHC-6 crash =

2010 aviation accident in Nepal

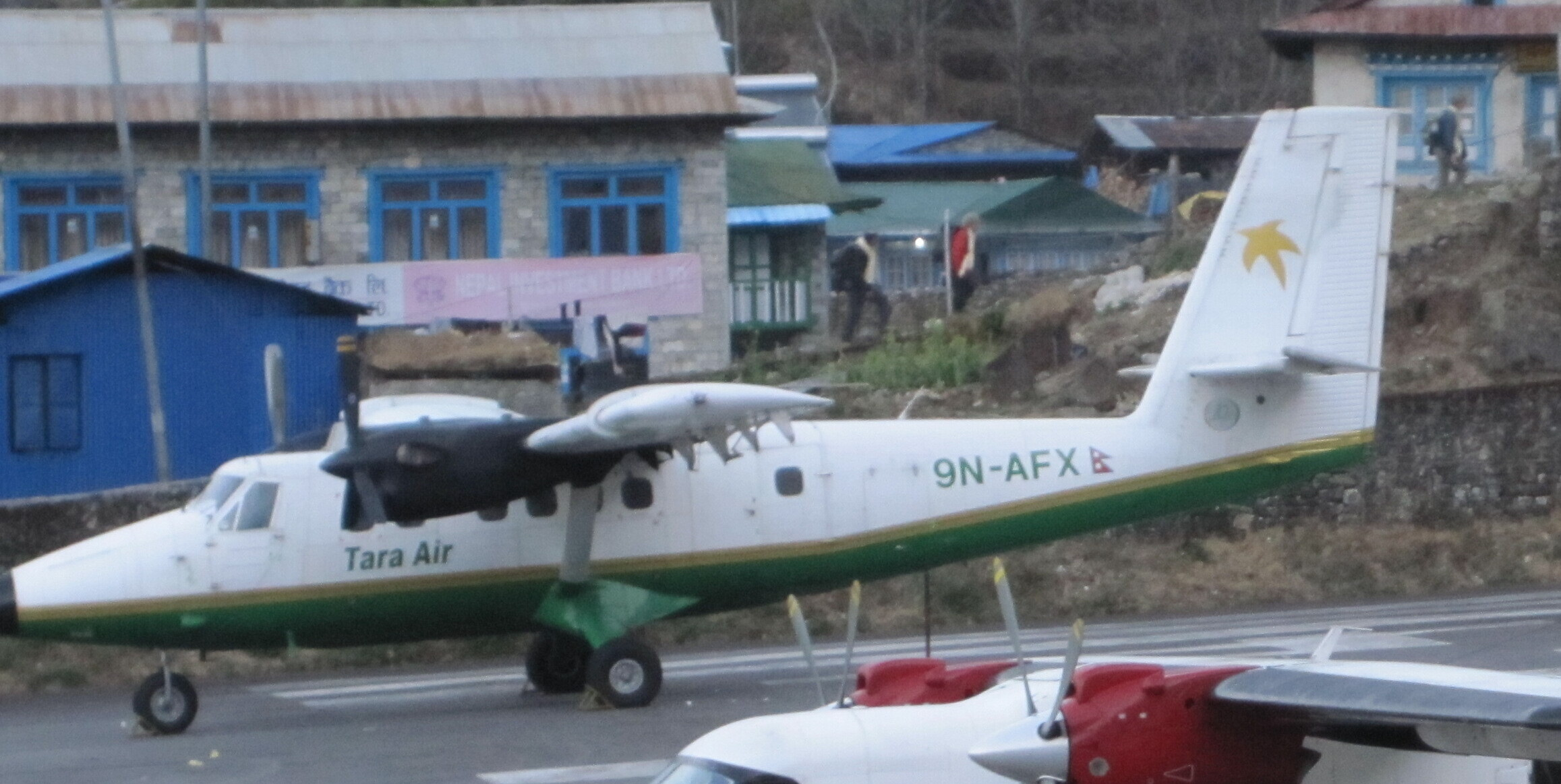
- 9N-AFX, the aircraft involved in the accident, seen in April 2010

Accident
- Date: 15 December 2010
- Summary: Controlled flight into terrain due to pilot error
- Site: Near Shreechaur, Okhaldhunga District, Nepal; 27.33°N 86.42°E

Aircraft
- Aircraft type: De Havilland Canada DHC-6 Twin Otter
- Operator: Tara Air
- Registration: 9N-AFX
- Flight origin: Lamidanda Airport, Lamidanda, Nepal
- Destination: Tribhuvan International Airport, Kathmandu, Nepal
- Occupants: 22
- Passengers: 19
- Crew: 3
- Fatalities: 22
- Survivors: 0

On 15 December 2010, a De Havilland Canada DHC-6 Twin Otter passenger aircraft of Tara Air crashed shortly after take-off on a domestic flight from Lamidanda to Kathmandu, Nepal. The wreckage of the aircraft was found in Bilandu forest near the village of Shreechaur the morning after the crash. All 19 passengers and three crew aboard were killed in the crash. There was initial speculation that bad weather or the overloading of the aircraft might have caused the crash. An investigation into the crash was launched by Nepalese authorities after the accident site was located.

== Accident ==
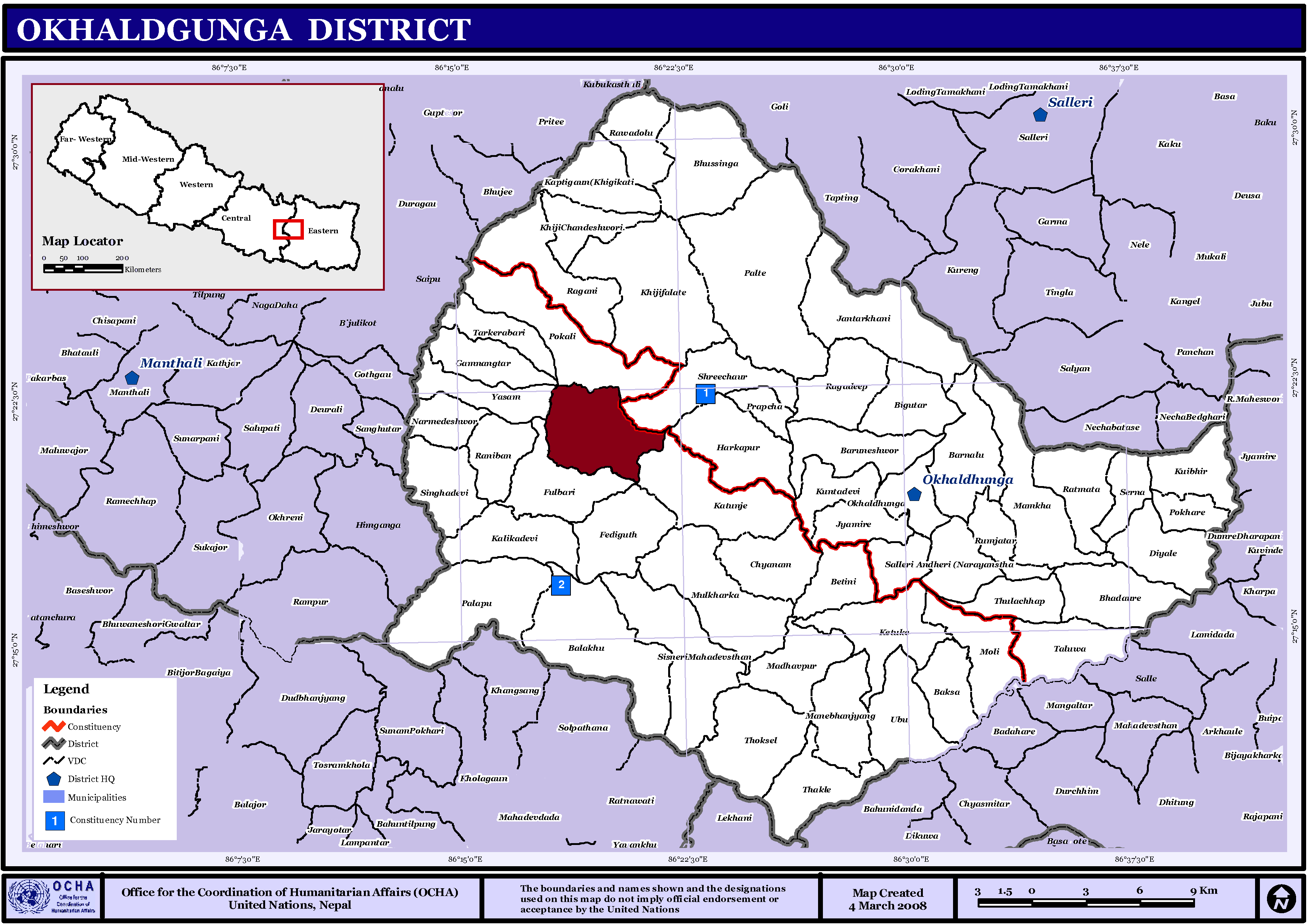
The location of the crash in Shreechaur/Bilandu, Okhaldhunga District, Nepal

Five minutes after taking off from Lamidanda Airport at 15:08 local time, the left wing of the aircraft impacted land and the DHC-6 crashed. The aircraft was reportedly scheduled to land in Kathmandu at around 15:35, 35 minutes after departure. All 19 passengers and three crew members aboard were killed in the crash.

There was initial speculation that bad weather caused the crash. The chief executive of Tara Air, Vijay Shrestha, said: "It showed poor visibility at different levels of the atmosphere. Thick haze at lower levels and as thick a cloud higher up could have caused poor visibility." There was also speculation that the aircraft could have been overloaded, but Shrestha refuted these allegations. "The aircraft's maximum take-off weight is 12,500 pounds, while the Twin Otter's take-off weight that crashed killing all 22 on board was 12,280 pounds," he said. "So it was underweight by 220 pounds, the allegation is wrong."

== Aircraft ==
The aircraft involved, manufactured in 1984 by De Havilland Canada, was a DHC-6 Twin Otter bearing the registration 9N-AFX with serial number 806. The aircraft was powered by two Pratt & Whitney Canada PT6A-27 engines.

== Search operation ==
Helicopters searched for the wreckage of the aircraft on the day of the crash, but were called off during the night because of poor visibility, even though night vision equipment was installed on board. The day after the crash, the Nepalese Army located the wreckage in Okhaldhunga, Nepal, at an altitude of approximately 2,700 metres (8,900 ft). All 22 bodies were recovered. The wreckage of the aircraft reportedly covered 200 square metres (2,200 sq ft), and, according to a police spokesperson, had "broken up completely".

== Investigation ==
An investigation into the crash was launched after the accident site was located. Nepal's Ministry of Tourism and Civil Aviation formed a group of five investigators to find the cause of the crash. The five were ordered to present a report on the accident by 90 days after the crash occurred. The cockpit voice recorder was recovered from the scene of the accident.

=== Other investigations ===
A separate investigation was also started into alleged irregularities, which, according to The Himalayan Times included "carrying passengers by issuing tickets in other's name, not verifying identity while checking-in passengers and the process of immigration of the foreign nationals who lost their lives in the crash." Police arrested the general manager of a travel agent based in Kathmandu over suspicions of tax evasion during the sale of tickets for the flight.

== See also ==
- 2010 in aviation
- Aviation safety
- List of accidents and incidents involving commercial aircraft
