= VNBG =

VNBG may refer to:

- Bajhang Airport (ICAO airport code)
- von Neumann–Bernays–Gödel set theory
