= Srichaur, Okhaldhunga =

Srichaur श्रीचौर
- Village development committee
- Location in Nepal
- Coordinates: 27.38°N 86.40°E
- Country: Nepal
- Zone: Sagarmatha Zone
- District: Okhaldhunga District

Population (1991)
  - Total: 2,388
- Time zone: UTC+5:45 (Nepal Time)

Srichaur is a village development committee in Okhaldhunga District in the Sagarmatha Zone of mid-eastern Nepal. At the time of the 1991 Nepal census it had a population of 2388 living in 437 individual households. On December 15, 2010 a plane crashed in the forest of Bilandu, in the southwestern part of Shreechaur VDC.
