= Hemantabada =

Hemantabada हेमन्तवाडा
- Location in Nepal
- Coordinates: 29.53°N 81.21°E
- Country: Nepal
- Province: Sudurpashchim Province
- District: Bajhang District

Population (1991)
  - Total: 2,583
  - Religions: Hindu
- Time zone: UTC+5:45 (Nepal Time)

Hemantabada is in Jaya Prithvi Municipality of Bajhang District in the Sudurpashchim Province of Nepal. Formerly the Village Development Committee, it was merged to form new municipality from 18 May 2014. At the time of the 1991 Nepal census it had a population of 2,583 and had 441 houses in the village.

== Media ==
To promote local culture Hemantabada has one FM radio station Saipal FM - 100.6 MHz which is a community radio station.
