= Jayaprithvi =

Jayaprithvi Municipality जयपृथ्वी नगरपालिका Chainpur
- Municipality
- Location in Nepal Jayaprithvi Municipality (Nepal)
- Coordinates: 29°33′N 81°12′E
- Country: Nepal
- Province: Sudurpashchim Province
- District: Bajhang District

Government
  - Mayor: Chet Raj Bajal
  - Deputy Mayor: Ratan Singh
- Time zone: UTC+5:45 (NST)
- Postal code: 10500
- Area code: 092
- Website: jayaprithvimun.gov.np

Jayaprithvi (ancient name Chainpur) is a municipality and the district headquarter of Bajhang District in Sudurpashchim Province of Nepal that was established on 18 May 2014 by merging the two former Village development committees Rithapata, Chainpur, Hemantabada, Luyanta and Subeda. It lies on the bank of Seti River.

== Demographics ==
At the time of the 2011 Nepal census, Jayaprithvi Municipality had a population of 22,553. Of these, 75.7% spoke Nepali, 23.7% Bajhangi, 0.2% Tamang, 0.1% Doteli, 0.1% Hindi, 0.1% Newar and 0.2% other languages as their first language.

In terms of ethnicity/caste, 41.6% were Chhetri, 22.4% Hill Brahmin, 15.1% Thakuri, 6.8% other Dalit, 5.6% Kami, 3.9% Sarki, 2.1% Damai/Dholi, 0.6% Sanyasi/Dasnami, 0.4% Tamang, 0.3% Badi, 0.3% Magar, 0.3% Newar, 0.1% Dhobi, 0.1% Kayastha, 0.1% Tharu and 0.2% others.

In terms of religion, 99.3% were Hindu, 0.5% Buddhist and 0.1% Christian.

In terms of literacy, 63.0% could read and write, 2.9% could only read and 34.1% could neither read or write.

== Transportation ==
Bajhang Airport lies in Old-Rithapata.
