= Ridhapata =

Rithapata रिठापाटा
- City
- Interactive map of Rithapata
- Country: Nepal
- Zone: Seti Zone
- District: Bajhang District

Population (1991)
  - Total: 2,017
  - Religions: Hindu
- Time zone: UTC+5:45 (Nepal Time)

Ridhapata is a market center in Jaya Prithvi Municipality of Bajhang District in the Seti Zone of north-western Nepal. At the time of the 1991 Nepal census it had a population of 2,017 and had 392 houses in the village.
