= Bilandu =

Bilandu बिलान्दु
- Village development committee
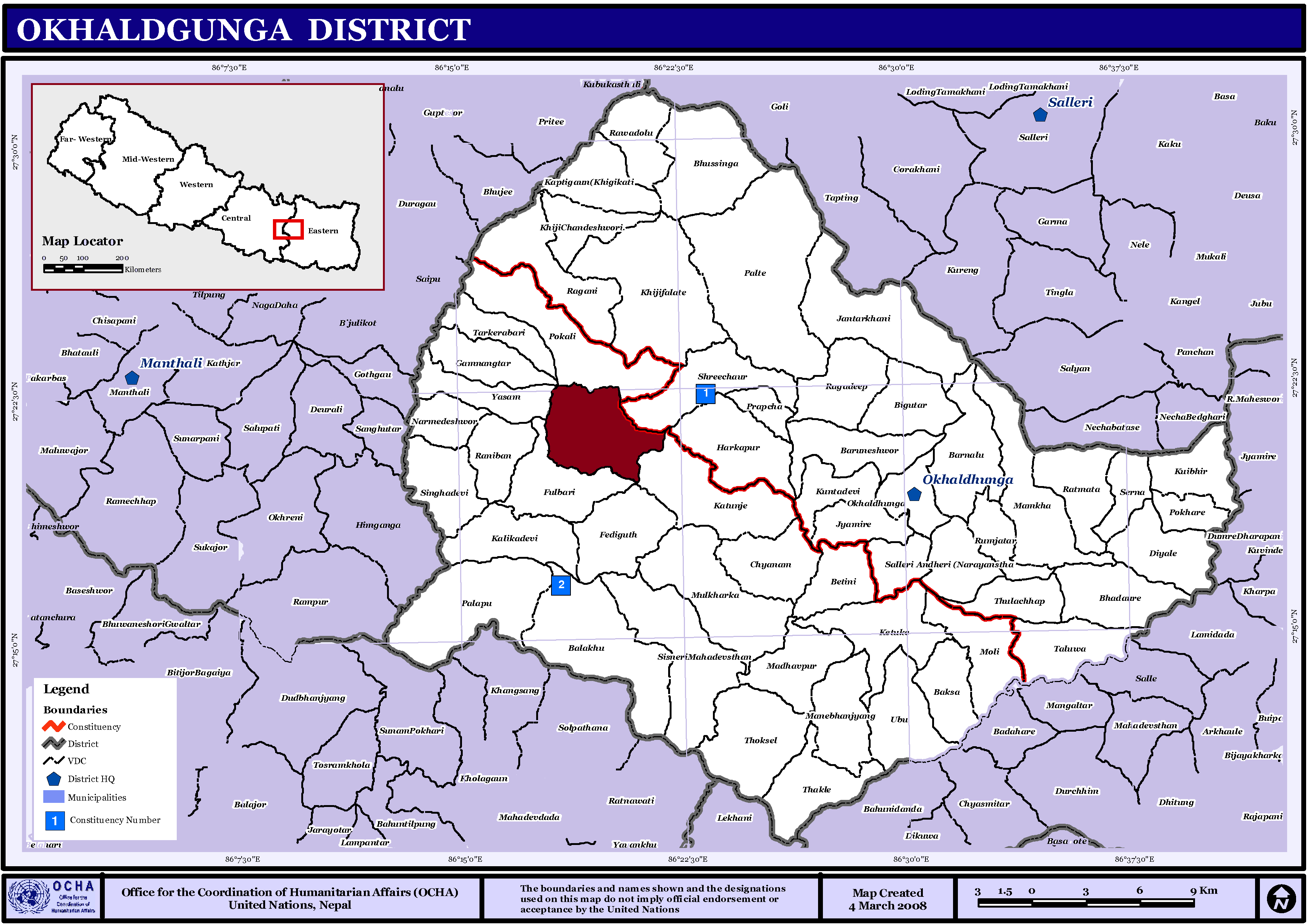
- VDC location in Okhaldhunga District

- Location in Nepal
- Coordinates: 27.36°N 86.32°E
- Country: Nepal
- Zone: Sagarmatha Zone
- District: Okhaldhunga District

Population (1991)
  - Total: 2,279
- Time zone: UTC+5:45 (Nepal Time)

Bilandu is a village development committee in Okhaldhunga District in the Sagarmatha Zone of mid-eastern Nepal. At the time of the 1991 Nepal census it had a population of 2279 living in 431 individual households. On December 15, 2010 a plane crashed in the forest of Bilandu, near the village of Shreechaur in the adjacent village development committee.
