= Sita Air Flight 601 =

2012 aviation accident

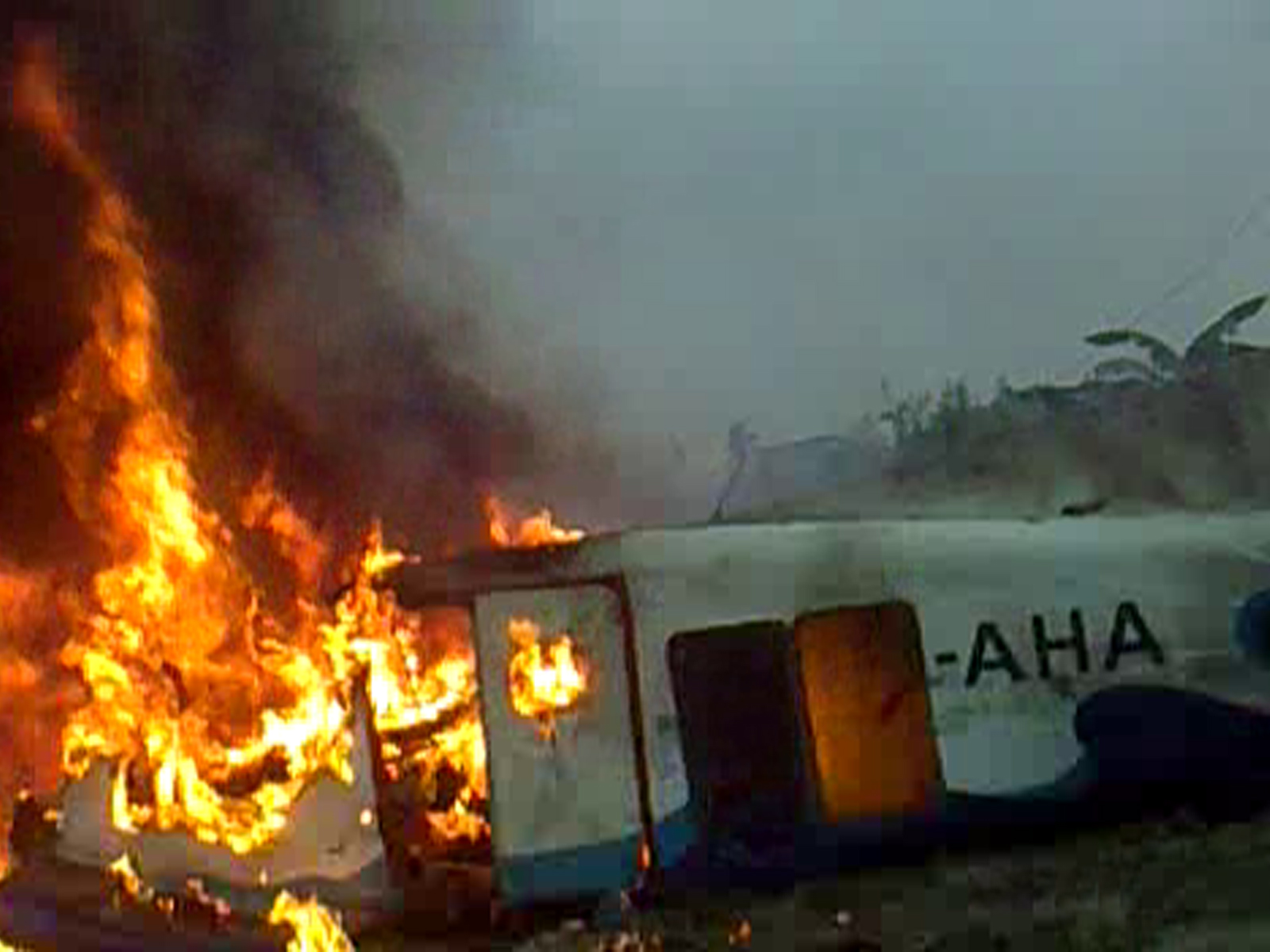
- The wreckage of Flight 601 minutes after the crash

Accident
- Date: 28 September 2012
- Summary: Loss of power on take-off for undetermined reasons following bird strike and dual-engine failure
- Site: Madhyapur Thimi, Nepal; 27°40′50″N 85°21′22″E

Aircraft
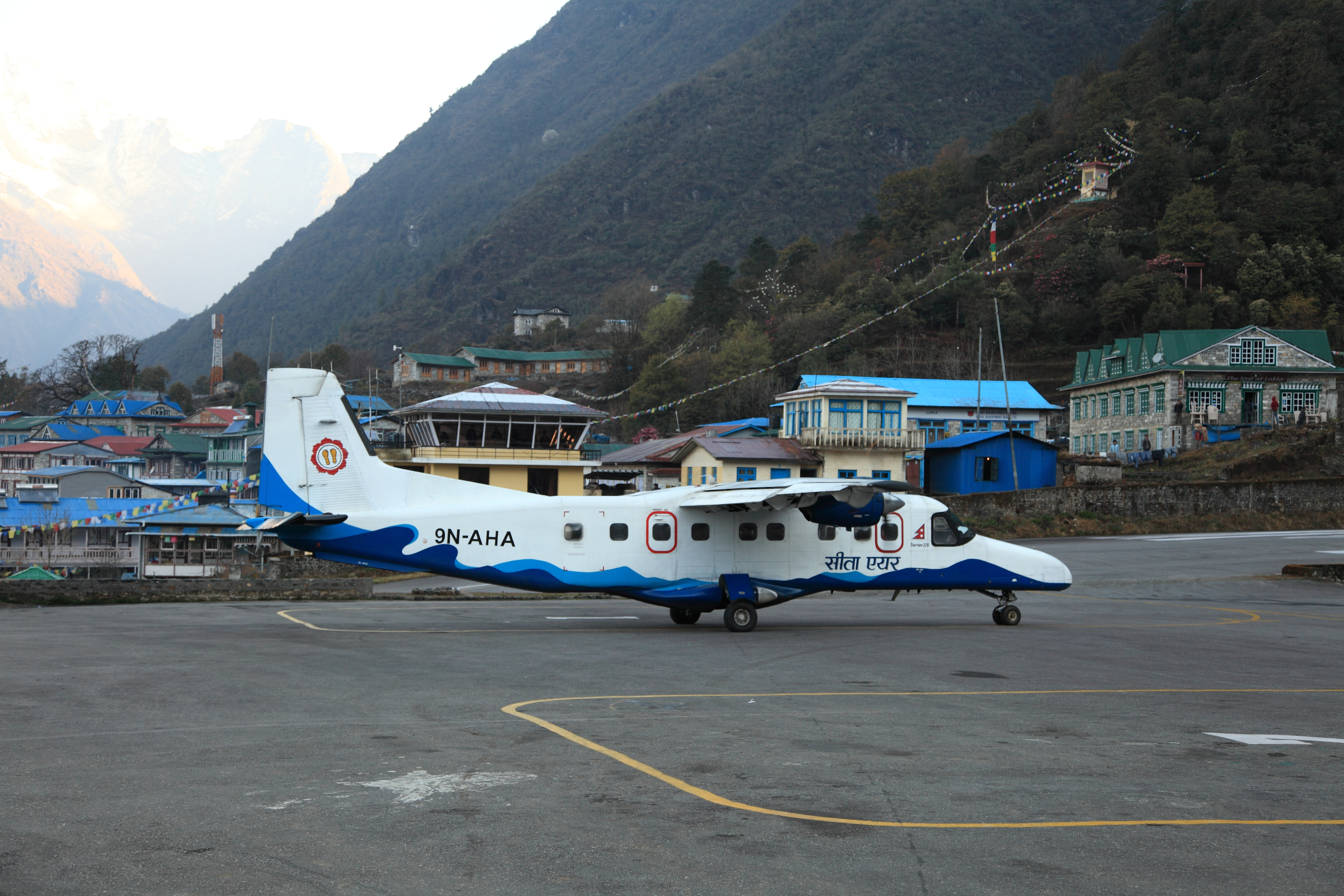
- 9N-AHA, the aircraft involved in the accident, in April 2012
- Aircraft type: Dornier 228
- Operator: Sita Air
- IATA flight No.: ST601
- ICAO flight No.: STA601
- Registration: 9N-AHA
- Flight origin: Tribhuvan International Airport, Kathmandu, Nepal
- Destination: Tenzing-Hillary Airport, Lukla, Nepal
- Occupants: 19
- Passengers: 16
- Crew: 3
- Fatalities: 19
- Survivors: 0

Sita Air Flight 601 (ST601/STA601) was a Nepalese domestic passenger flight, operated by Sita Air from Tribhuvan International Airport in Nepal's capital Kathmandu to Tenzing-Hillary Airport in Lukla. On 28 September 2012, the Dornier 228 serving the route crashed while attempting an emergency landing at Kathmandu shortly after takeoff, killing all 19 people on board.

The final report, published by the Nepal's Aircraft Accident Investigation Commission (NAICC), determined that a thrust reduction occurred during the take-off roll, but the cause of the anomaly could not be determined. Subsequent crew inability to maintain speed above stall speed, followed by the insufficient height of the aircraft, led to the aircraft crashing.

== Accident ==
Flight 601 took off from Tribhuvan International Airport at 06:17 local time. It was the first flight to depart from Tribhuvan International Airport that day. While at an altitude of 50 feet (15 m), the pilot reported technical issues with the aircraft, and requested to fly back to the airport. Flight crews reported to Kathmandu that the aircraft may have hit a vulture. This was noticed by Kathmandu's air traffic controller, as the aircraft began to sway and do unusual manoeuvres. Three minutes after take-off, on the way back to the airport, the aircraft descended near Manohara River. It then nose-dived, narrowly missed a slum and crashed on the banks of the Manohara River and caught fire. The front part of the fuselage was completely destroyed.

Immediately after the crash, Tribhuvan Airport's fire brigade were quickly deployed. Dozens of army personnel and rescue personnel rushed to the scene of the crash, though some reports said the fire brigade took more than half-an hour. Eyewitnesses stated that several people survived the crash and were screaming for help inside the burning wreckage. Local residents wanted to help, but were afraid that if they directed water onto the engine it might explode. When emergency services arrived at the crash site, most parts of the plane were completely destroyed. All 19 people on board perished in the accident.

== Aircraft ==
The aircraft involved in the accident was a twin turboprop Dornier 228-202, registration 9N-AHA, serial number 8123. Before it was sold to Sita Air, it was acquired by Holiday Express in 1987. It later entered the Australian registration of VH-NSH and then the American registration of N2255E for G M Hock Construction. It was sold to Executive World Airways as F-ODZG and in 1990 it was sold to Air Caraïbes.

== Passengers and crew ==
Most of the passengers were foreigners, travelling to Lukla for trekking in the Himalayas. The British Embassy in Nepal confirmed that at least 7 Britons were on the flight. The youngest British victim was 27 whilst the oldest was 60. At least 5 Chinese nationals and 7 Nepalis were on board the flight.

Nationality	Fatalities		Total
Nationality	Passengers	Crew	Total
Nepal	4	3	7
China	5	0	5
United Kingdom	7	0	7
Total	16	3	19

== Investigation ==
The Nepal Civil Aviation Authority was ordered to investigate the crash with assistance from the British Air Accidents Investigation Branch. Investigators started to collect evidence related to the crash. Both the flight data recorder and the cockpit voice recorder were recovered. During its takeoff roll, the weather in Tribhuvan was in good condition with good visibility. Based on interviews by eyewitnesses, the aircraft was on fire while it was crashing to the ground.

A relative of Flight 601's co-pilot said he had warned that flights on the airline were routinely overloaded and that a nearby slum attracted birds to the runway. However, Sagar Acharya, the airline's head of flight safety, denied the aircraft was carrying too much weight. Most reports stated that the aircraft suffered a bird strike shortly after taking off from Tribhuvan. Conflicting reports stated that it had struck a black eagle, while others stated that it had hit a vulture. This bird strike report was confirmed by the air traffic controller on duty, as the air traffic controller stated that the pilot contacted Tribhuvan's Tower for an intention for emergency landing due to "technical glitches", possibly due to a bird strike. Based on the ATC statements, the right engine of Flight 601 might have been hit by a bird and caught fire. Investigators later focused on the bird strike theory.

Investigators later stated that the impact of the bird strike might have caused the pilot to become nervous. The aircraft later caught fire, and in an attempt to douse the fire, the pilot attempted an emergency landing on Manohara river, but somehow nose-dived and crashed onto the football ground.

Based on preliminary report published on 30 September 2012, the bird collided with the right hand engine at about 50 feet above ground causing some part to separate from the engine. The part later impacted the vertical tail and disabled the rudder, severing the controls of the plane. The plane then began to turn sharply. It then went out of control and subsequently crashed.

Investigators inspected the CCTV footage of the crash, and noticed that a flash had occurred on the right engine of Flight 601, approximately 5 seconds before rotation. An eyewitness, a professional pilot, reported that he noticed that the aircraft had an unsuccessful attempt to lift the aircraft. The nose did lift up however with the tail of the plane nearly struck the ground. The NAAIC then found that the crew called "V_{1}" prematurely, thus the aircraft couldn't get airborne. The NAAIC then reported that the aircraft was not able to maintain 77 KIAS in level flight suggesting that one engine had failed and the other had suffered a power loss of at least 13%. An analysis later was made by the NAAIC:

"It is possible that the bird momentarily disturbed the air flow into the engine before it was struck by the propeller, causing a surge and the suspected flame seen in the CCTV footage, but the engine manufacturer considered this unlikely. The manufacturer considered that if the bird had been sufficiently close to the air intake to disturb the air flow it would have been sucked in. If the flame seen in the CCTV and accompanying 'bang' heard on the CVR were evidence of an engine surge, then another possible cause is a fuel flow problem. However, the manufacturer also commented that this type of engine was very resistant to surge."

Later investigation found that the propellers of Flight 601 were not on feathered position and were operating normally. The investigation revealed that the engine had not lost all power but was operating at low power. Thrust levers in the cockpit was also revealed that there were no engines that had been shut down by the crew during the incident. No bird remains were found inside the engines. However, there was evidence that the black kite had been struck by the propellers.

According to the load sheet of Flight 601, the flight took off with a takeoff mass of 5,834 kilograms (12,862 lb) and an estimated landing mass of 5,698 kilograms (12,562 lb). The load sheet indicated that no luggage had been loaded, surveillance videos however showed luggage of about 80 kilograms (180 lb) was loaded and not removed before the aircraft departed the stand. Thus the takeoff weight was corrected to 5,914 kilograms (13,038 lb) while using Nepal's standard weights for passengers, thus the aircraft was overloaded. However, overloading alone can not explain the performance problem, as further analysis revealed that a grossly overloaded aircraft would have had a better performance than 9N-AHA during the accident flight.

Sound analysis of the cockpit voice recorder and flight data recordings revealed that the drag produced by the propeller exceeded the thrust produced. The investigation later stated: "The drag on an engine at flight idle is greater than the drag on an inoperative engine (OEI), and in the case of 9N-AHA where the flight idle fuel flow was incorrectly set too low, the drag would have been even greater at idle (in excess of 350 kilograms (770 lb) of drag – reference section 1.16.2). It is therefore possible that at about 6,200 kilograms (13,700 lb) with one engine at 100% power and one engine at flight idle, there would have been insufficient thrust to maintain 77 kt, and the additional drag on one side would have affected controllability more than in the OEI case"

Investigators stated that the power loss occurred at 70 KIAS, while V_{1} was at 83 KIAS. When a power loss occurred below V_{1}, the crew should have rejected the take off. The crew seemed to not be aware of the power loss. The aircraft continued to accelerate, though at a lower rate than during previous takeoffs, became airborne at 86 KIAS above V_{2} and continued to accelerate for about 2 seconds, at which point the speed began to continuously decay. NAAIC stated that the crew possibly didn't recognize the power loss because it occurred gradually and progressively rather than instantaneously.

If an aircraft malfunction occurred on takeoff or above V_{1}, the airport allows flight crews to continue the takeoff or land back on the runway should it be long enough to safely bring the aircraft to a stop. A long runway was available during the incident, which should have been sufficient to bring the aircraft to a halt. However, the crew opted to not choose this option and continued their flight. The investigation stated that the crew likely opted not to land back at the airport because of company policy to continue their flight for an engine malfunction at or above V_{1}.

The NAAIC then concluded its investigation as follows:

"No faults were found with either of the engines, there was no evidence of a bird ingestion into the engine. Both engines were producing low power at impact, both propellers were in their normal operating range. However, an insidious power reduction occurred starting at 70 KIAS which went unnoticed by the crew. Following lift off the pitch attitude was set too high for the aircraft to maintain V_{2}, the aircraft's speed fell below V_{2} requiring more thrust than available to accelerate again. The investigation was unable to determine the cause of the thrust reduction."

== See also ==
- Buddha Air Flight 103
- Nepal Civil Aviation Authority
- Transport in Nepal
