= Lamidanda Airport =

Lamidanda Airport लामिडाँडा बिमानस्थल
- IATA: LDN; ICAO: VNLD

Summary
- Airport type: Public
- Owner: Government of Nepal
- Operator: Civil Aviation Authority of Nepal
- Serves: Lamidanda, Nepal
- Elevation AMSL: 4,100 ft / 1,250 m
- Coordinates: 27°15′11″N 086°40′12″E

Map
- Location of airport in Nepal

Runways
Direction	Length		Surface
Direction	m	ft	Surface
08/26	520	1,706	Asphalt

Lamidanda Airport (IATA: LDN, ICAO: VNLD) is a domestic airport located in Lamidanda, Rawabesi, serving Khotang District, a district in Koshi Province in Nepal. According to the Civil Aviation Authority of Nepal, it is the gateway to the Halesi-Maratika Caves. Status: Not Active

== Facilities ==
The airport is at an elevation of 4,100 feet (1,250 m) above mean sea level. It has one runway which is 518 metres (1,699 ft) in length.

== Airlines and destinations ==
Airlines	Destinations
Tara Air	Kathmandu

== Accidents and incidents ==
On 15 December 2010, a Tara Air flight operated by DHC-6 Twin Otter crashed into a mountain shortly after departure. The aircraft was operating a chartered passenger flight to Tribhuvan International Airport, Kathmandu, Nepal. All 19 passengers and crew were killed.
