= Luyanta =

Luyanta लुयन्ता
- Location in Nepal
- Coordinates: 29.51°N 81.18°E
- Country: Nepal
- Zone: Seti Zone
- District: Bajhang District

Population (1991)
  - Total: 3,450
  - Religions: Hindu
- Time zone: UTC+5:45 (Nepal Time)

Luyanta is a market center in Jaya Prithvi Municipality of Bajhang District in the Seti Zone of north-western Nepal. At the time of the 1991 Nepal census it had a population of 3,450 and had 436 houses in the village.
