= Manohara River =

River in Kathmandu, Nepal

Coordinates: 27°40′43″N 85°20′02″E

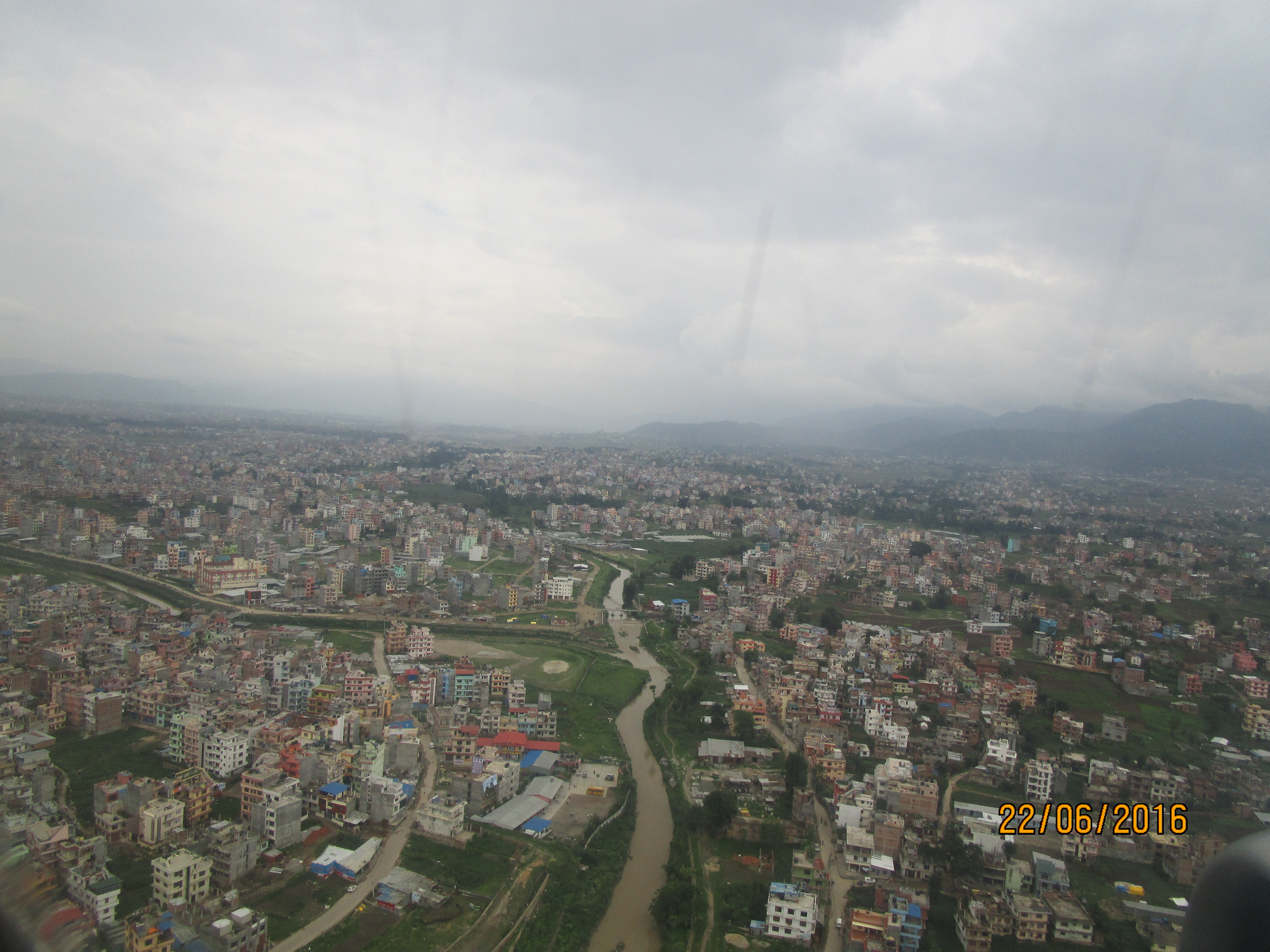
Manahara River in Narephate

Manahara River (Nepali: मनोहरा खोला) is a tributory river of Bagmati river originating in northeast part of the Kathmandu Valley and merging with the Hanumante River, which finally joins the Bagamati river at Shankahmul. The flooding of the river affected the residents on multiple occasions.

The river stretches 28 km from northeast to southwest and covers 83 km^{2}. It is narrow and straight upstream, becoming wider and meandering downstream. The northern and eastern catchments, made up of gneiss, granite, and other hard rocks, have fine drainage, high relief, and frequent drainage. In contrast, the western catchment, composed of soft fluvio-lacustrine deposits, has coarser drainage, lower relief, and less frequent drainage.

== History ==
On September 28, 2012, Sita Air Flight 601, a Dornier 228 plane crashed near the river after ingesting a vulture with its engine. All 19 people on board are killed.
