= Hanumante River =

River in Nepal

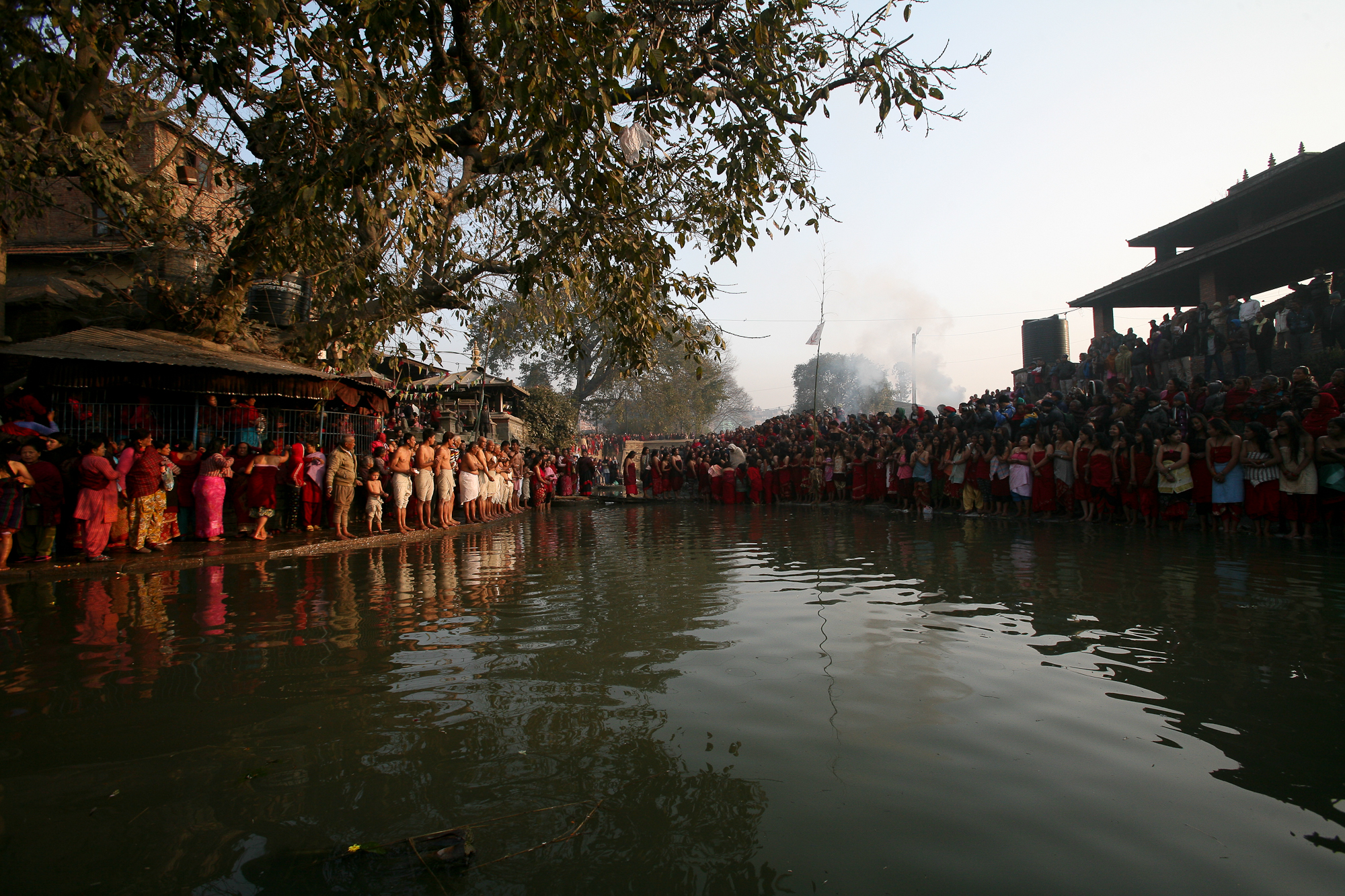
- Hanumante River at Hanuman Ghat

Location
- Country: Nepal
- Province: Bagmati Province
- District: Bhaktapur District; Lalitpur District

Physical characteristics
- Source: Mahadev Pokhari
  - location: Nagarkot
  - coordinates: 27.693207086419946°N 85.51977447393836°E
- Length: 143 km (89 mi)
- Width
  - minimum: 10 metres (33 ft)
  - average: 20 metres (66 ft)

The Hanumante River is a tributary of the Bagmati River which is almost entirely in the district of Bhaktapur, Nepal. It originates from Mahadev Pokhari, Nagarkot, the river flows through Bhaktapur and Thimi Municipality before joining Manohara River, Kathmandu District. The river is named after the Hindu god Hanuman. The Hanumante River has an average width of a minimum of 10m to a maximum of 20m.

In July 2020, the river flooded the district of Bhaktapur due to heavy rainfall.
