= Subeda =

Subeda सुवेडा
- Location in Nepal
- Coordinates: 29.53°N 81.14°E
- Country: Nepal
- Zone: Seti Zone
- District: Bajhang District

Population (1991)
  - Total: 3,381
  - Religions: Hindu
- Time zone: UTC+5:45 (Nepal Time)

Subeda is a market center in Jaya Prithvi Municipality of Bajhang District in the Seti Zone of north-western Nepal. At the time of the 1991 Nepal census it had a population of 3,381 and had 683 houses in the village.
