= Rawabesi Rural Municipality =

Rawa Besi रावा बेसी गाउँपालिका
- Rural Municipality
- Location in Province No. 1 Rawa Besi (Nepal)
- Coordinates: 27.27°N 86.70°E
- Province: Province No. 1
- District: Khotang
- Wards: 6
- Established: 10 March 2017
- Seat: Kubhinde

Government
  - Type: Rural Council
  - Chairperson: Mr. Fatik K. Shrestha (Nepali Congress)
  - Vice-chairperson: Mrs. Koushila Gurung (NCP)

Area
  - Total: 97.44 km^{2} (37.62 sq mi)

Population (2011)
  - Total: 13,369
  - Density: 137.2/km^{2} (355.4/sq mi)
- Time zone: UTC+5:45 (Nepal Standard Time)
- Website: official website

Rawa Besi (Nepali: रावा बेसी गाउँपालिका) is a rural municipality (gaunpalika) in Khotang District of Koshi Province of Nepal.

According to Ministry of Federal Affairs and Local Developme Rawabesi has an area of 97.44 square kilometres (37.62 mi^{2}) and the total population of the municipality is 13369 as of Census of Nepal 2011.

== History ==
Fulfilling the requirement of the new Constitution of Nepal 2015, the Ministry of Federal Affairs and Local Development replaced all old VDCs and Municipalities into 753 new local level body (Municipality). Therefore, Kubhinde, Kharpa, Hanchaur, Lamidanda, Dubekol and Dharapani which previously were all separate Village development committee merged to form this new local level body.

The rural municipality is divided into total 6 wards and the headquarter of this newly formed rural municipality is situated in Kharpa.

== Transportation ==
Lamidanda Airport is offering flights to Kathmandu.
