= Rara Airport =

Rara Airport रारा विमानस्थल/ताल्चा विमानस्थल
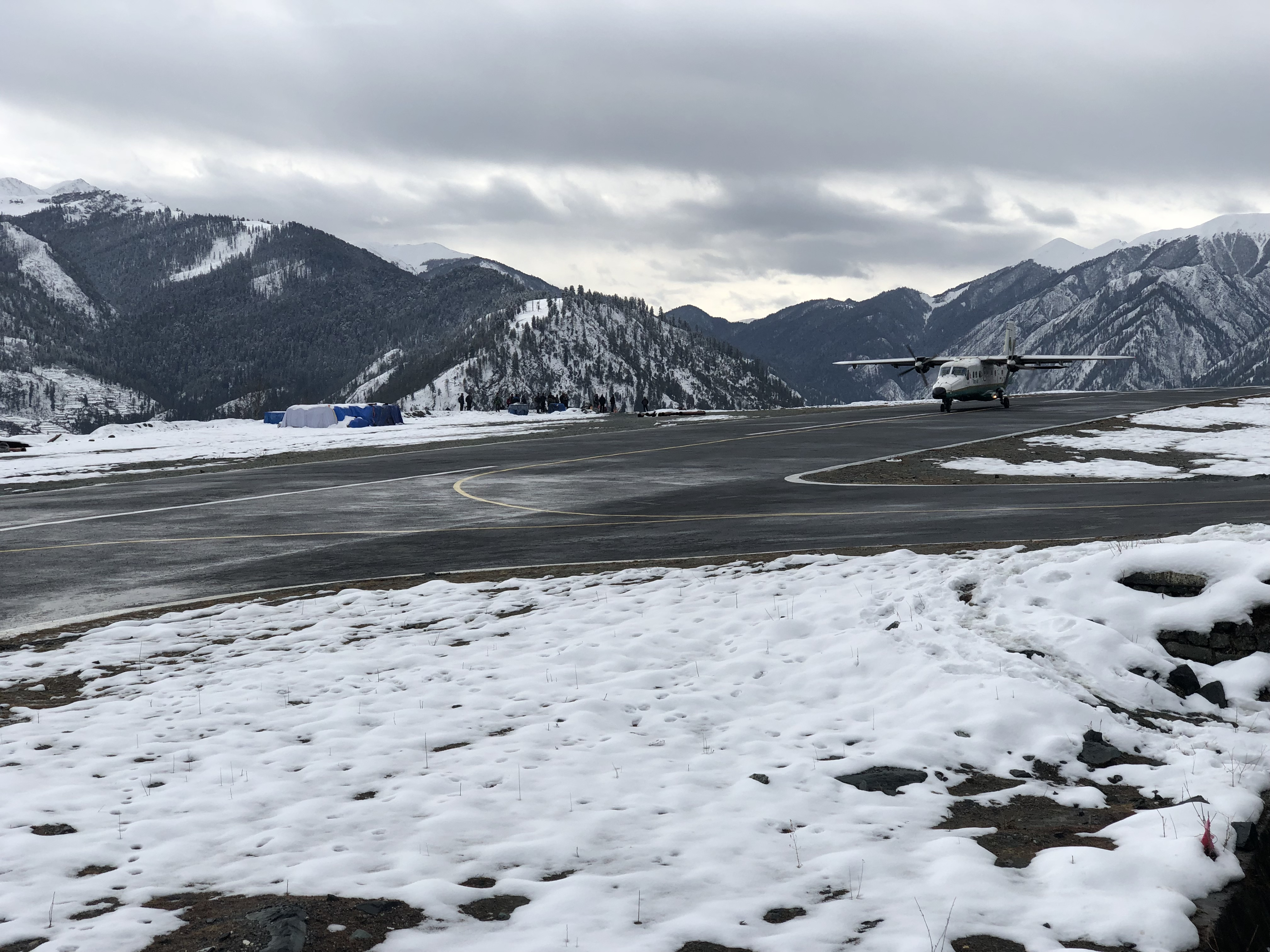
- IATA: none; ICAO: VNRR

Summary
- Airport type: Public
- Owner: Government of Nepal
- Operator: Civil Aviation Authority of Nepal
- Serves: Chhayanath Rara and Rara National Park, Nepal
- Coordinates: 29°31′20″N 082°08′49″E
- Website: rara.caanepal.gov.np

Map
- Location of airport in Nepal

Runways
Direction	Length		Surface
Direction	m	ft	Surface
18/36	570	1,870	Asphalt

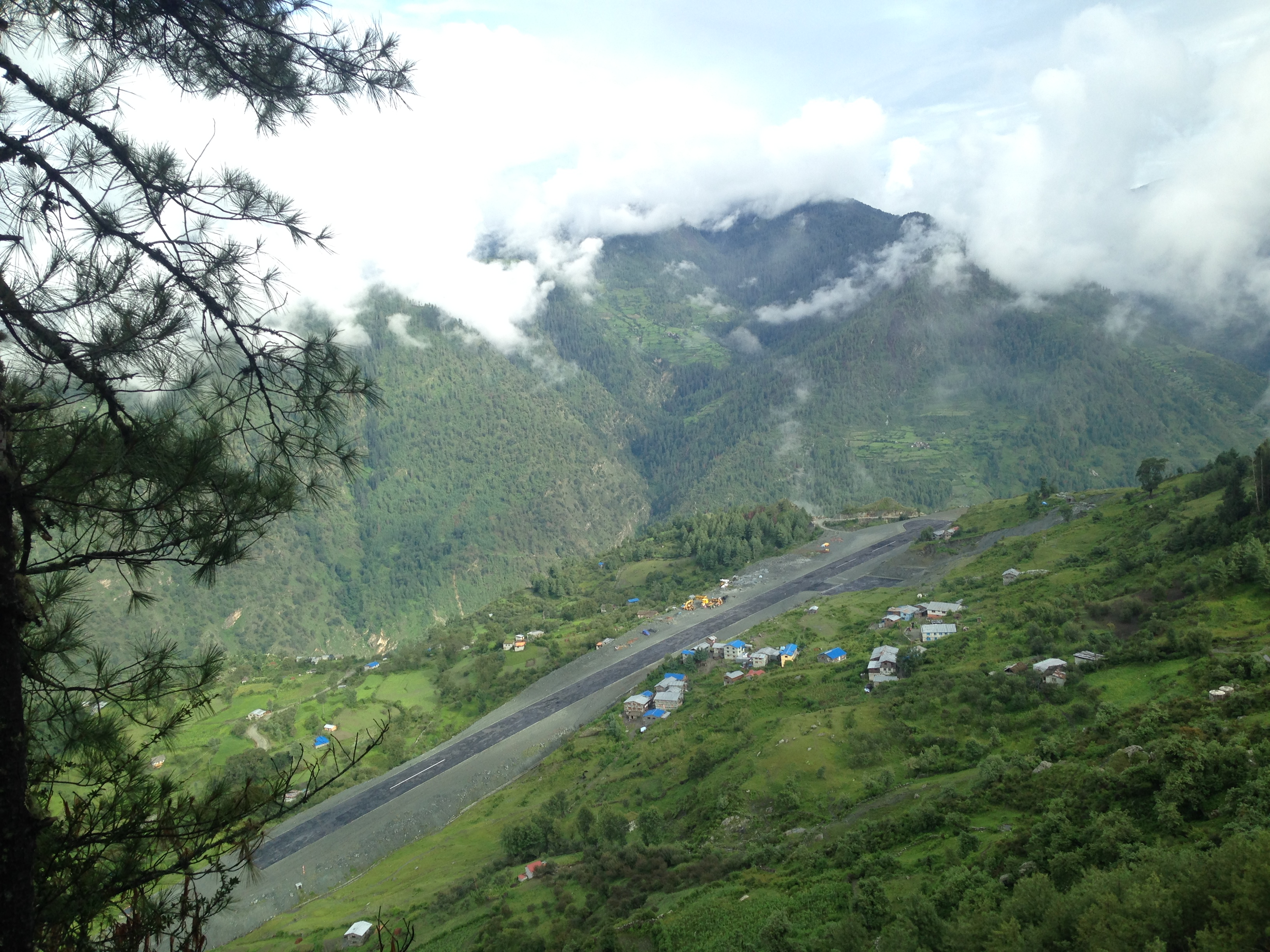
An aerial view of Talcha airport during summer.

Rara Airport (ICAO: VNRR), also known as Talcha Airport, is a domestic airport located in Chhayanath Rara serving Rara National Park in Karnali Province in Nepal.

== History ==
The airport was constructed in 1975, operating with a single gravel runway until 2015, when the runway was asphalted over.

== Airlines and destinations ==
Airlines	Destinations
Sita Air	Nepalgunj
Summit Air	Birendranagar, Nepalgunj
Tara Air	Nepalgunj

== Accidents and incidents ==
- On 26 May 2010, a Tara Air DHC-6 Twin Otter took off from Birendranagar Airport in Surkhet, heading for Rara Airport with 18 passengers and 3 crew on board. At 10 am, the aircraft had to make an emergency landing at Birendranagar Airport, after its cabin door suddenly opened five minutes after take-off. Tara Air officials said that the cabin attendant managed to lock the door immediately after it opened, to avert any possible mishaps.
- On 21 November 2011, a Makalu Air Cessna 208B Grand Caravan took off from Surkhet Airport, en route to Rara Airport. Upon touchdown at Rara, the aircraft skidded off the runway and hit a rock, damaging the front of the aircraft—four of the 11 occupants were injured.
