= Surkhet Airport =

Airport in Nepal

Surkhet Airport सुर्खेत विमानस्थल
- IATA: SKH; ICAO: VNSK

Summary
- Airport type: Public
- Owner: Government of Nepal
- Operator: Civil Aviation Authority of Nepal
- Serves: Birendranagar, Nepal
- Hub for: Makalu Air; Summit Air
- Elevation AMSL: 2,402 ft (732 m)
- Coordinates: 28°35′09″N 081°38′09″E
- Website: surkhet.caanepal.gov.np

Map
- Location of airport in Nepal

Runways
Direction	Length		Surface
Direction	m	ft	Surface
02/20	1,255	4,117	Asphalt
- Source: DAFIF

Surkhet Airport (IATA: SKH, ICAO: VNSK), also known as Birendranagar Airport, is a domestic airport located in Birendranagar serving Surkhet District, a district in Karnali Province in Nepal. The Civil Aviation Authority of Nepal considers it an important hub for cargo transport into remote Western areas of Nepal, however this role is declining due to increasing road connectivity. Buddha Air has started daily flights to and from Kathmandu since 22 December, 2022 using its ATR-72 aircraft.

== History ==
The airport was established in October 1966, however major connections to Kathmandu were only established with services from Buddha Air in 2018. Previously this airport was only used by Nepalese Army Air Service and local services.

== Facilities ==
The airport resides at an elevation of 2,400 feet (732 m) above mean sea level. It has one asphalt runway which is 1,255 metres (4,117 ft) in length. There are plans to extend the runway.

== Airlines and destinations ==
Airlines	Destinations
Buddha Air	Kathmandu
Guna Airlines	Kathmandu
Nepal Airlines	Simikot
Summit Air	Bajura, Chhayanath Rara, Jumla, Simikot

== Accidents and incidents ==
- 17 July 2002 - A Skyline Airways De Havilland Canada DHC-6 Twin Otter 300 (9N-AGF) left Jumla on a flight to Surkhet. Some 18 minutes after take-off and 10 km north of Surkhet, at an altitude of about 6500 feet, the aircraft crashed into trees on the Gargare Danda hill in bad weather. All two crew and two passengers were killed.
- On 26 May 2010 a Tara Air DHC-6 Twin Otter had taken off from Surkhet Airport heading for Talcha Airport in Rara National Park, with 18 passengers and 3 crew on board. At 10 am, the aircraft had to make an emergency landing at Surkhet after its cabin door suddenly opened five minutes after take-off. Tara Airlines officials said that the cabin attendant managed to lock the door immediately after it opened.

== See also ==
List of airports in Nepal
