= Kubhinde, Khotang =

Former Village Development Committee in Nepal

Kubhinde कुभिन्डे
- Village Development Committee
- Location in Nepal
- Coordinates: 27.28°N 86.74°E
- Country: Nepal
- Zone: Sagarmatha Zone
- District: Khotang District

Population (1991)
  - Total: 2,189
- Time zone: UTC+5:45 (Nepal Time)

Kubhinde is a village and Village Development Committee in Khotang District in the Sagarmatha Zone of eastern Nepal. At the time of the 1991 Nepal census it had a population of 2,189 persons living in 406 individual households.
