= Bajhang Airport =

Bajhang Airport बझाङ विमानस्थल
- IATA: BJH; ICAO: VNBG

Summary
- Airport type: Public
- Owner: Government of Nepal
- Operator: Civil Aviation Authority of Nepal
- Serves: Bajhang District, Nepal
- Elevation AMSL: 4,100 ft / 1,250 m
- Coordinates: 29°32′20″N 81°11′07″E

Map
- Location of airport in Nepal

Runways
| Direction | Length | | Surface |
| Direction | m | ft | Surface |
|---|---|---|---|
| 07/25 | 654 | 2,146 | Asphalt/concrete |

Bajhang Airport (IATA: BJH, ICAO: VNBG) is a domestic airport located in Jayaprithvi serving Bajhang District, a district in Sudurpashchim Province in Nepal.

== History ==
The airport was originally opened in October 1976 but ceased to operate after road access to the district headquarter Chainpur was established in 2008. There are plans to reopen the airport after the runway is blacktopped, which was due to be done by 2020. Until 2022, there were no scheduled services to and from Bajhang Airport. Previously Nepal Airlines operated routes to Nepalgunj and Dhangadhi.

== Facilities ==
The airport resides at an elevation of 4,100 feet (1,250 m) above mean sea level. It has one runway which is 654 metres (2,146 ft) in length.

== Airlines and destinations ==
| Airlines | Destinations |
|---|---|
| Nepal Airlines | Dhangadhi |

== See also ==
- List of airports in Nepal
