= Bowang, Nepal =

Bowang बोवाङ
- Village development committee
- Location in Nepal Bowang (Nepal)
- Coordinates: 28.52°N 83.05°E
- Country: Nepal
- Zone: Dhaulagiri Zone
- District: Baglung District

Population (1991)
  - Total: 4,920
  - Religions: Hindu
- Time zone: UTC+5:45 (Nepal Time)

Bowang is a village development committee in Baglung District in the Dhaulagiri Zone of central Nepal. At the time of the 1991 Nepal census it had a population of 4,920 and had 992 houses in the town.
