= Kharpa =

Village Development Committee in Sagarmatha Zone, Nepal

Kharpa खार्पा
- Village Development Committee
- Location in Nepal
- Coordinates: 27.27°N 86.70°E
- Country: Nepal
- Zone: Sagarmatha Zone
- District: Khotang District

Population (1991)
  - Total: 2,096
- Time zone: UTC+5:45 (Nepal Time)

Kharpa is a village and Village Development Committee in Khotang District in the Sagarmatha Zone of eastern Nepal. At the time of the 1991 Nepal census it had a population of 2,096 living in 393 individual households.
