= Chaurjahari Airport =

Airport in Nepal

Rukum Chaurjahari Airport
- IATA: RUK; ICAO: VNCJ

Summary
- Airport type: Public
- Owner: Government of Nepal
- Operator: Civil Aviation Authority of Nepal
- Elevation AMSL: 2,460 ft / 762 m
- Coordinates: 28°37′38″N 082°11′39″E

Map
- Location of airport in Nepal

Runways
Direction	Length		Surface
Direction	m	ft	Surface
03/21	600	1,969	Asphalt

Rukum Chaurjahari Airport (IATA: RUK, ICAO: VNCJ) is a domestic airport located in Chaurjahari serving Western Rukum District, a district in Karnali Province in Nepal.

== History ==
The airport started operations on 24 September 1973. The airport was renovated and the runway blacktopped in 2014 after previously only having a grass/clay runway. After not having scheduled services for several years, Nepal Airlines resumed services from the airport in 2018.

== Facilities ==
The airport is at an elevation of 2,460 feet (750 m) above mean sea level. It has one runway which is 600 metres (1,969 ft) in length.

== Airlines and destinations ==
Since the early 2020s, there are no scheduled services to and from Chaurjahari Airport. Previously Nepal Airlines operated routes to Kathmandu and Nepalgunj.
