= Chainpur, Bajhang =

Chainpur चैनपुर
- Municipality
- Location in Nepal
- Coordinates: 29°33′N 81°12′E
- Country: Nepal
- Zone: Seti Zone
- District: Bajhang District

Population (1991)
  - Total: 4,143
  - Religions: Hindu
- Time zone: UTC+5:45 (Nepal Time)
- Postal code: 10500
- Area code: 092

Chainpur is an ancient town in Jaya Prithvi Municipality and headquarters of Bajhang District in the Seti Zone of north-western Nepal. The formerly Village Development Committee was merged to form new municipality from 18 May 2014. At the time of the 1991 Nepal census it had a population of 4,143 and had 759 houses in the village. It has a grass runway in town with limited flights. From 1990-2002 the Peace Corps operated in Chainpur.

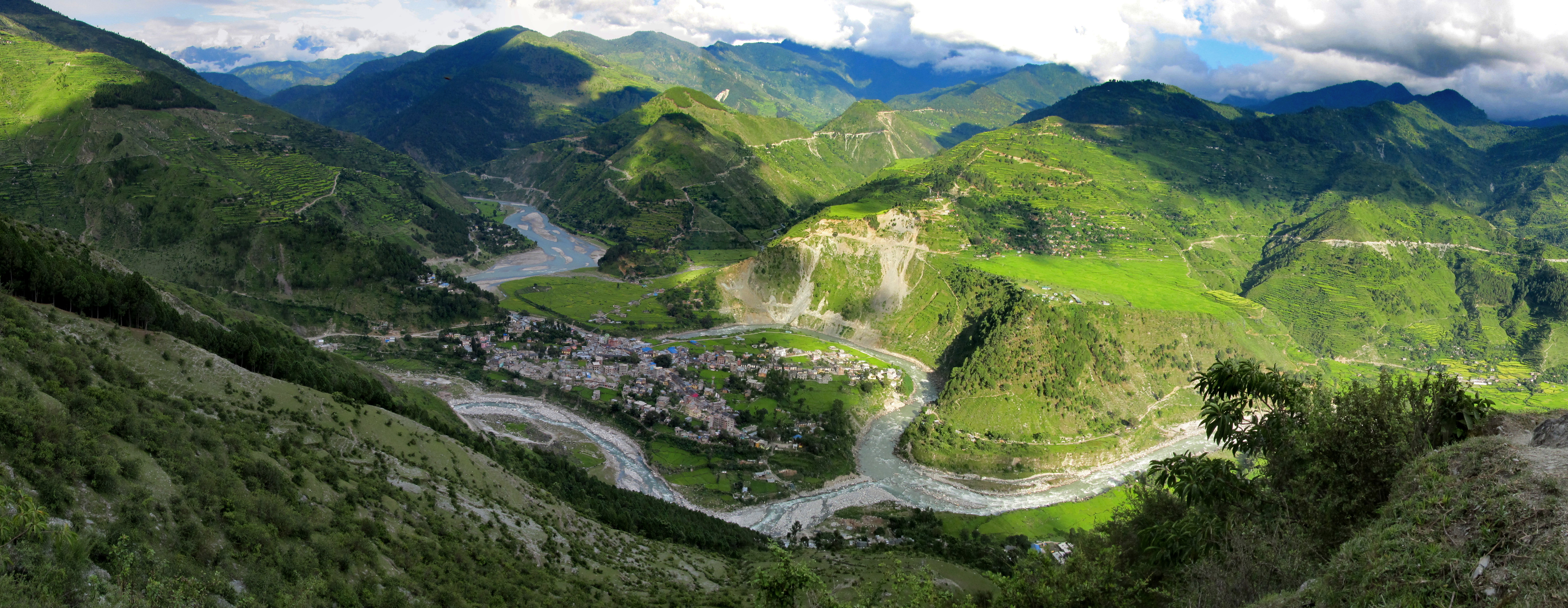
Looking East Over Chainpur Bazaar and the Seti River

== Pop culture ==
Sydney Wignall's 'Prisoner in Red Tibet' and 'Spy on the Roof of the World': the story starts and finishes in Chainpur.

== Media ==
To Promote local culture Chainpur has two Community radio Station. one is jayaprithvi FM - 96.3 MHz and Bajhang FM.
