= Dolpa Airport =

Dolpa Airport डोल्पा विमानस्थल
- IATA: DOP; ICAO: VNDP

Summary
- Airport type: Public
- Owner: Government of Nepal
- Operator: Civil Aviation Authority of Nepal
- Serves: Dolpa District and Thuli Bheri
- Location: Thuli Bheri, Dolpa, Nepal
- Elevation AMSL: 8,200 ft (2,500 m)
- Coordinates: 28°59′09″N 082°49′09″E

Map
- Location of airport in Nepal

Runways
Direction	Length		Surface
Direction	m	ft	Surface
15/33	663	2,175	Asphalt (since 2017)

Dolpa Airport (IATA: DOP, ICAO: VNDP), also known as Juphal Airport is a domestic airport located in Juphal, Thuli Bheri serving Dolpa District, a district in Karnali Province in Nepal. It is one of the two airports of the district. Dolpo Airport was established in 1978 and inaugurated by then-king Birendra Bir Bikram Shah.

== History ==
The airport was upgraded in 2017, when the gravel runway was turned into a blacktopped runway.

== Facilities ==
The airport resides at an elevation of 8,200 feet (2,499 m) above mean sea level. It has one runway designated 15/33 measuring 663 by 30 metres (2,175 ft × 98 ft).

== Airlines and destinations ==
Airlines	Destinations
Nepal Airlines	Nepalgunj
Sita Air	Nepalgunj
Summit Air	Nepalgunj
Tara Air	Nepalgunj

== See also ==
- List of airports in Nepal
