= Simikot Airport =

Airport in Nepal

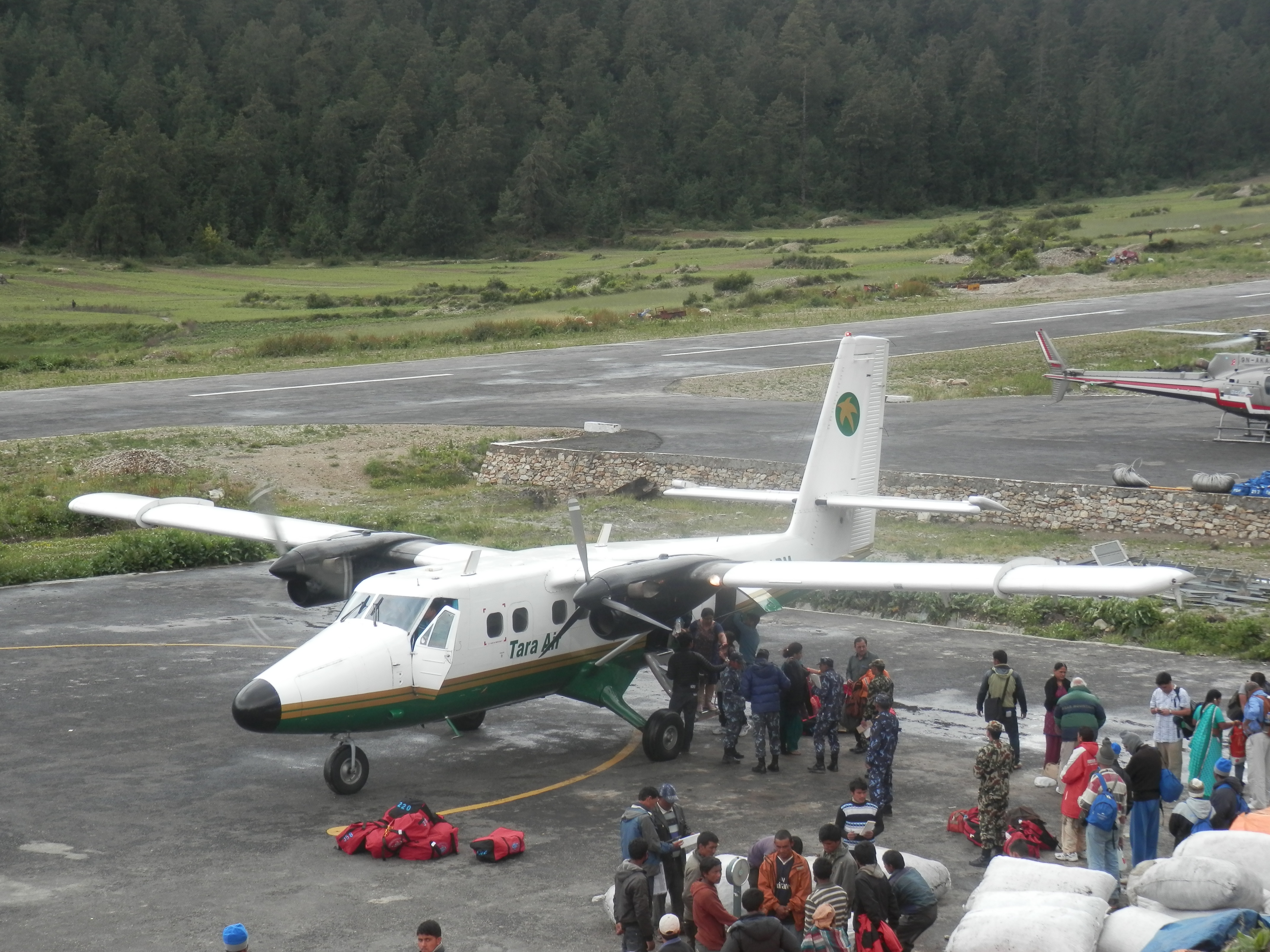
- Tara Air Twin Otter at Simikot
- IATA: IMK; ICAO: VNST

Summary
- Airport type: Public
- Owner: Government of Nepal
- Operator: Civil Aviation Authority of Nepal
- Serves: Simikot, Nepal
- Elevation AMSL: 9,246 ft (2,818 m)
- Coordinates: 29°58′16″N 081°49′08″E
- Website: simikot.caanepal.gov.np

Map
- Location of airport in Nepal

Runways
Direction	Length		Surface
Direction	m	ft	Surface
10/28	650	2,133	Asphalt Concrete
- Source: Great Circle Mapper

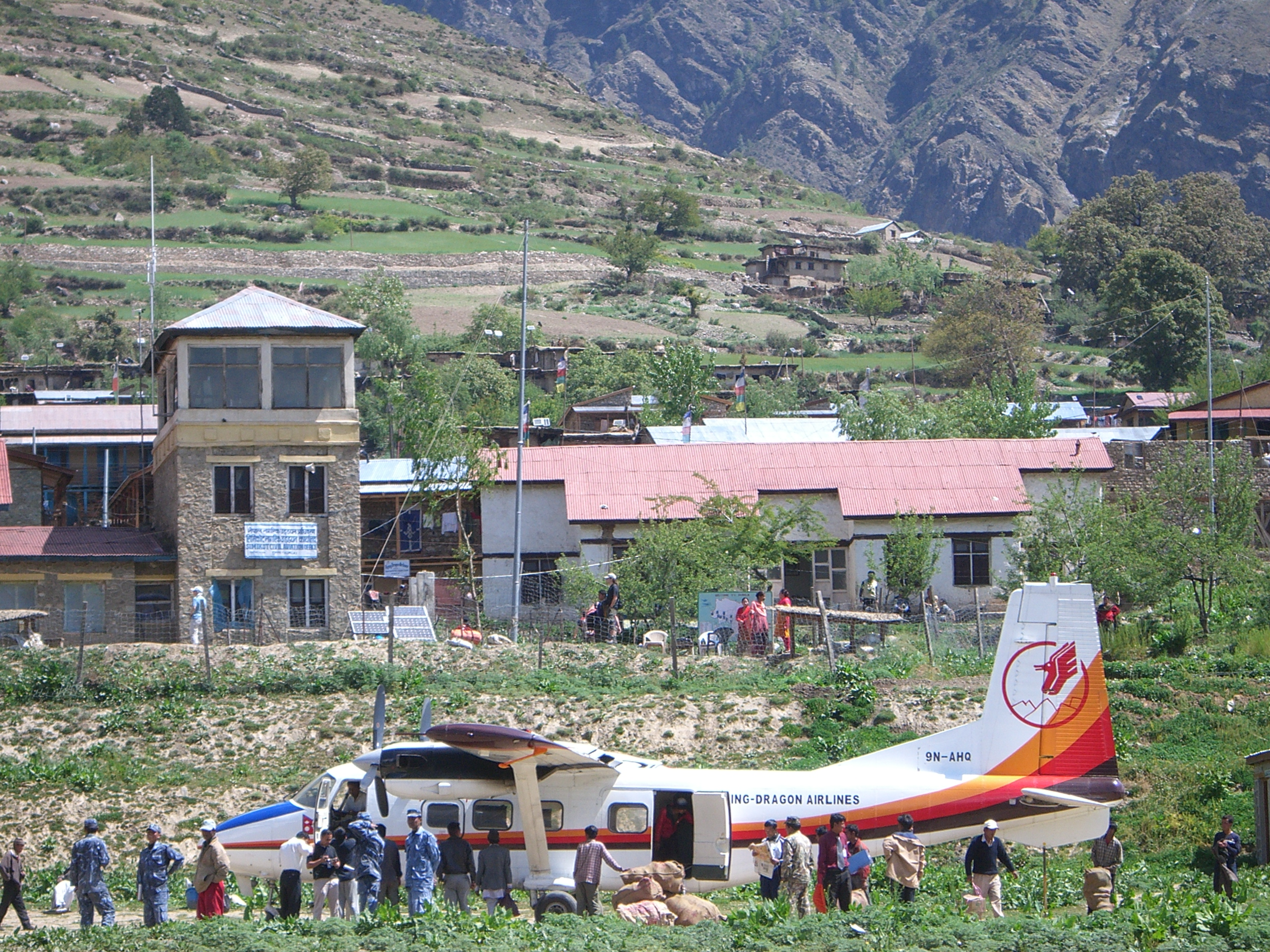
Flying Dragon Airlines Harbin Y-12 at Simikot Airport

Simikot Airport (IATA: IMK, ICAO: VNST) is a domestic airport located in Simikot serving Humla District, a district in Karnali Province in Nepal. It is the main tourist gateway on the Nepalese side to the Mount Kailash and Lake Manasarovar. As road access in this area of Nepal is weak, the airport facilitates travel in the whole district of Humla.

== Facilities ==
The airport resides at an elevation of 9,246 ft (2,818 m) above mean sea level. It has one runway which is 549 m (1,801 ft) in length. The runway has recently been improved and extended with more infrastructure being built.

As a result of this construction the parking facilities and terminals also have seen some improvement. Pilgrims and Trekkers bound for Lake Manasarovar and Mount Kailash in China's Tibet Autonomous Region fly into Simikot and proceed to the international border at Hilsa on foot

== Airlines and destinations ==
Airlines	Destinations
Nepal Airlines	Birendranagar, Nepalgunj
Sita Air	Nepalgunj
Summit Air	Birendranagar, Nepalgunj
Tara Air	Nepalgunj

== Accidents and incidents ==
- On 23 June 2011, Tara Air Dornier 228 9N-AGQ was substantially damaged in a heavy landing and runway excursion. The aircraft was operating a cargo flight from Nepalgunj Airport.
