= Jumla Airport =

Airport in Nepal

Jumla Airport जुम्ला विमानस्थल
- IATA: JUM; ICAO: VNJL

Summary
- Airport type: Public
- Owner: Government of Nepal
- Operator: Civil Aviation Authority of Nepal
- Serves: Jumla, Nepal
- Elevation AMSL: 7,700 ft (2,300 m)
- Coordinates: 29°16′27″N 82°11′36″E
- Website: jumla.caanepal.gov.np

Map
- Location of airport in Nepal

Runways
| Direction | Length | | Surface |
| Direction | m | ft | Surface |
|---|---|---|---|
| 09/27 | 670 | 1,742 | Asphalt |

Jumla Airport (IATA: JUM, ICAO: VNJL) is a domestic airport located in Jumla serving Jumla District, a district in Karnali Province in Nepal.

== Facilities ==
The airport resides at an elevation of 7,700 feet (2,347 m) above mean sea level. It has one asphalt paved runway designated 09/27 which measures 670 by 25 metres (2,198 ft × 82 ft).

== Airlines and destinations ==
| Airlines | Destinations |
|---|---|
| Nepal Airlines | Nepalgunj |
| Sita Air | Nepalgunj |
| Summit Air | Birendranagar, Nepalgunj |
| Tara Air | Nepalgunj |

== Accidents and incidents ==
- 5 July 1992 - RNA De Havilland Canada DHC-6 Twin Otter 300 (9N-ABB), lost directional control on takeoff from Jumla Airport on a flight to Surkhet. The aircraft ran off the runway and struck the airport perimeter fence. None of the three crew were injured and there were no passengers on board.
- 18 January 1999 - Necon Air Cessna 208 Caravan I (9N-ADA) climbed steeply to 450 feet (140 m) after takeoff from Jumla Airport, but stalled and crashed and caught fire. The fire could not be extinguished because fire fighting equipment was not available at the airport. Of 10 passengers and 2 crew, 4 passengers and 1 crew member were killed. The probable cause of the accident was the pilot's failure to put the aircraft in take off configuration.
- 21 June 2006 - A Yeti Airlines De Havilland Canada DHC-6 Twin Otter Series 300 (9N-AEQ), on a flight from Surkhet approaching Jumla Airport, the pilot apparently decided to go around. The aircraft crashed into a mountainside on the eastern side of the airport, killing all three crew and six passengers.
- 9 June 2018 - A Tara Air De Havilland Canada DHC-6 Twin Otter Series 300 (9N-AEV), on a flight from Nepalgunj, the plane bounced several times at landing before departing the left side of the runway. The nose landing gear collapsed and the aircraft skidded until coming to rest against a fence abeam the runway 09 threshold. The airplane sustained substantial damage upon impact with airport fencing but there were no reported injuries on board.

== See also ==
List of airports in Nepal
