= Nepalgunj Airport =

Nepalgunj Airport नेपालगञ्ज विमानस्थल
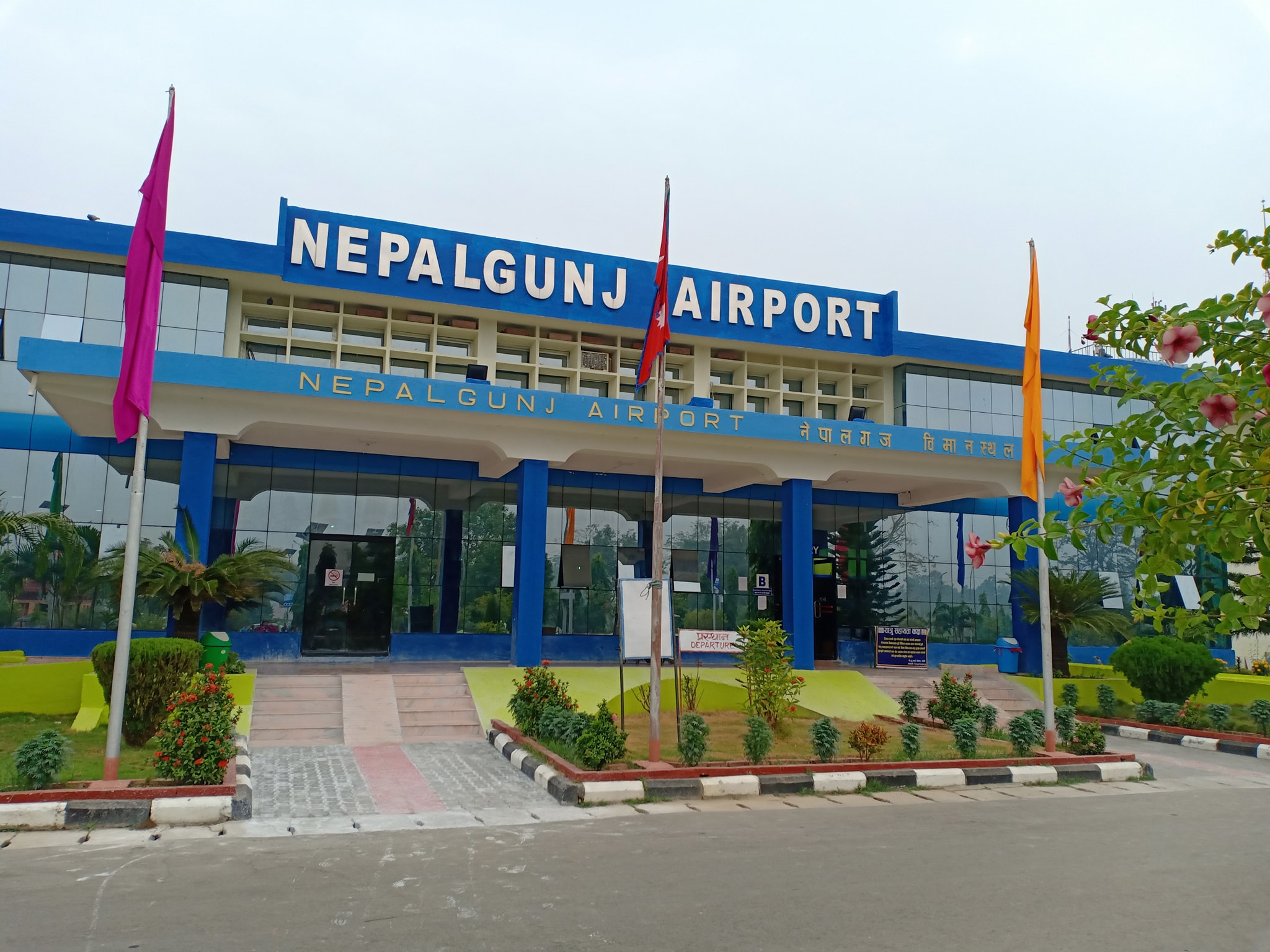
- Old Terminal
- IATA: KEP; ICAO: VNNG

Summary
- Airport type: Public
- Owner: Government of Nepal
- Operator: Civil Aviation Authority of Nepal
- Serves: Nepalgunj, Nepal
- Elevation AMSL: 518 ft (158 m)
- Coordinates: 28°06′13″N 081°40′01″E
- Website: nepalgunj.caanepal.gov.np

Map
- Location of airport in Nepal

Runways
Direction	Length		Surface
Direction	m	ft	Surface
08/26	1,700	5,577	Asphalt
- Source: Civil Aviation Authority of Nepal

Nepalgunj Airport (IATA: KEP, ICAO: VNNG) is a domestic airport serving Nepalgunj, in Banke District, a district in Lumbini Province in Nepal. There are plans by the Civil Aviation Authority of Nepal to promote the airport to an international airport and establishing immigration, customs and quarantine facilities.

== History ==
The airport has been in service since 1961. In land area it is the fourth largest airport in Nepal. It also has the second greatest number of aircraft and passenger movements out of all domestic airports. After the introduction of FK-100 jet aircraft, passenger movement at this airport increased by 13.39% in 2005 (up to November) against the figure in the year 2004.

In 2005, Flying Dragon Airlines set up its operating base at the airport, however the airline ceased to operate one year later.

=== Future developments ===
Since 2018, the airport is being upgraded to serve as an international airport, as Buddha Air is preparing to start direct flights to Delhi. There are plans to construct a new international terminal with separate customs facilities as well as extending the runway.

== Facilities ==
The airport is at an elevation of 540 ft (165 m) above mean sea level. It has one runway designated 08/26 with an asphalt surface measuring 1,700 m × 30 m (5,577 ft × 98 ft).

== Airlines and destinations ==
Airlines	Destinations
Buddha Air	Kathmandu, Pokhara–International
Guna Airlines	Kathmandu
Nepal Airlines	Bajura, Dolpa, Jumla, Musikot, Simikot
Saurya Airlines	Kathmandu
Shree Airlines	Kathmandu
Sita Air	Bajura, Chhayanath Rara, Dolpa, Jumla, Kathmandu, Simikot
Summit Air	Bajura, Chhayanath Rara, Dolpa, Jumla, Kathmandu, Simikot
Tara Air	Bajura, Tikapur, Chhayanath Rara, Dolpa, Jumla, Simikot
Yeti Airlines	Kathmandu

== Statistics ==
=== Passenger numbers ===
	Passengers
2014	165,867
2015	▲176,372
2016	▲233,533
2017	▲369,355
2018	▲426,661
2019	▲453,433
