= Jumla (town) =

Jumla जुम्ला
- Town
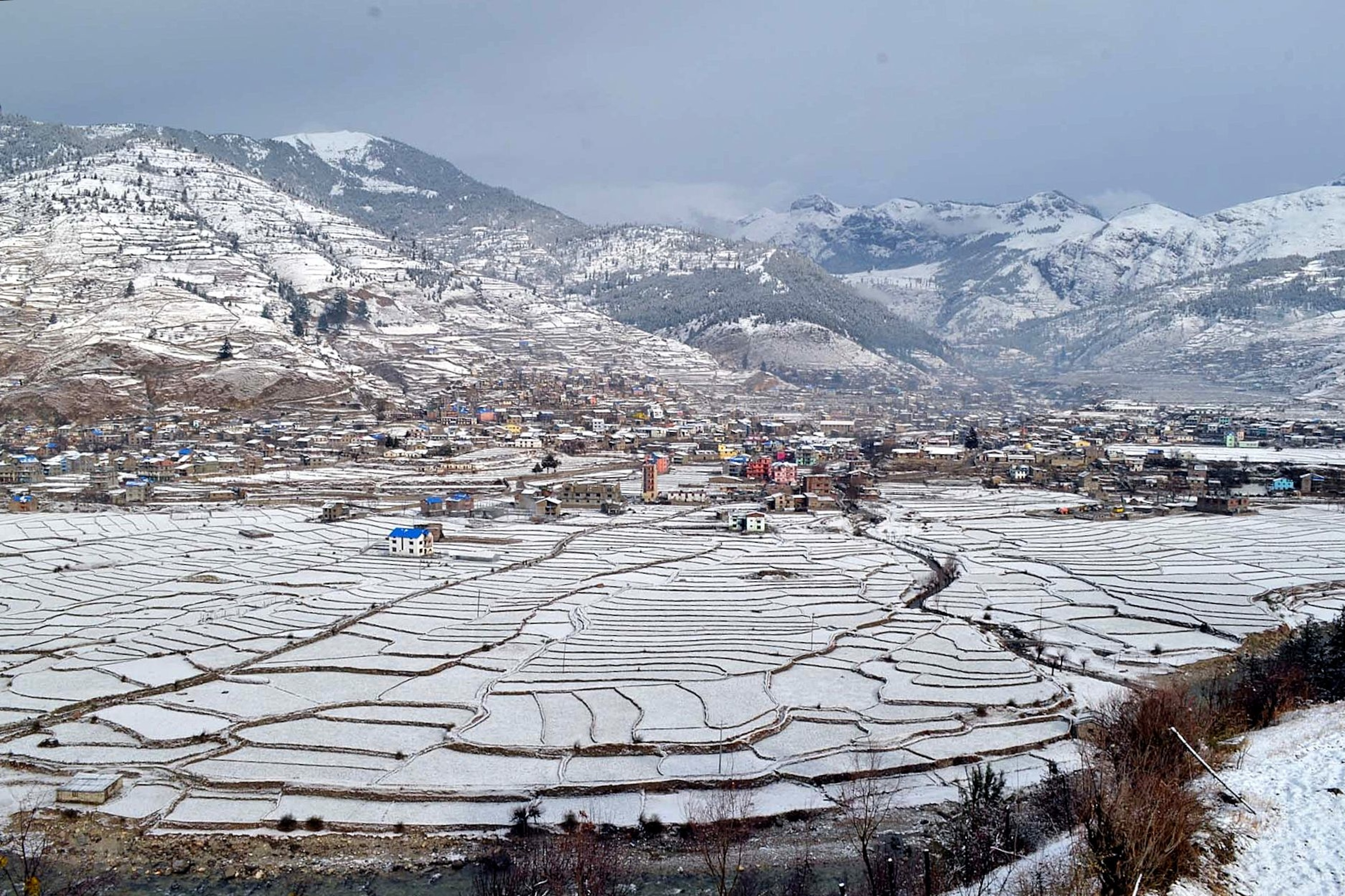

- Location in Nepal
- Coordinates: 29°16′31″N 82°11′0″E
- Country: Nepal
- Province: Karnali Province
- District: Jumla District
- Elevation: 2,514 m (8,248 ft)
- Time zone: UTC+5:45 (Nepal Time)

Jumla is the centre of Chandannath Municipality in Jumla District of Karnali Province of Nepal. It is located at 2514 metres (8251 feet) elevation.

== Geography ==
Jumla is one of the 77 districts in the midwestern hills of Nepal. Rice cultivation in Jumla ranges from 2,400 to 3,050 m altitude, which is the highest elevation in the world. The highest elevation at 3,050 m is Chhumjul of Jumla, a record altitude, where rice is cultivated in Nepal. Jumli Marshi, a Japonica variety of indigenous rice, has the cold tolerant gene and has probably been cultivated since 1,300 years ago in Jumla on the bank of the Tila River. The Tila Valley as well as the Sinja Khola Valley are covered with paddy fields growing the 'Kali Marshi' rice variety, a unique red rice that is sought after for its special taste.

Jumla has a STOL airport, Jumla Airport, and the road network first reached it from Surkhet in May 2007. It is the usual starting point for treks to Rara Lake.

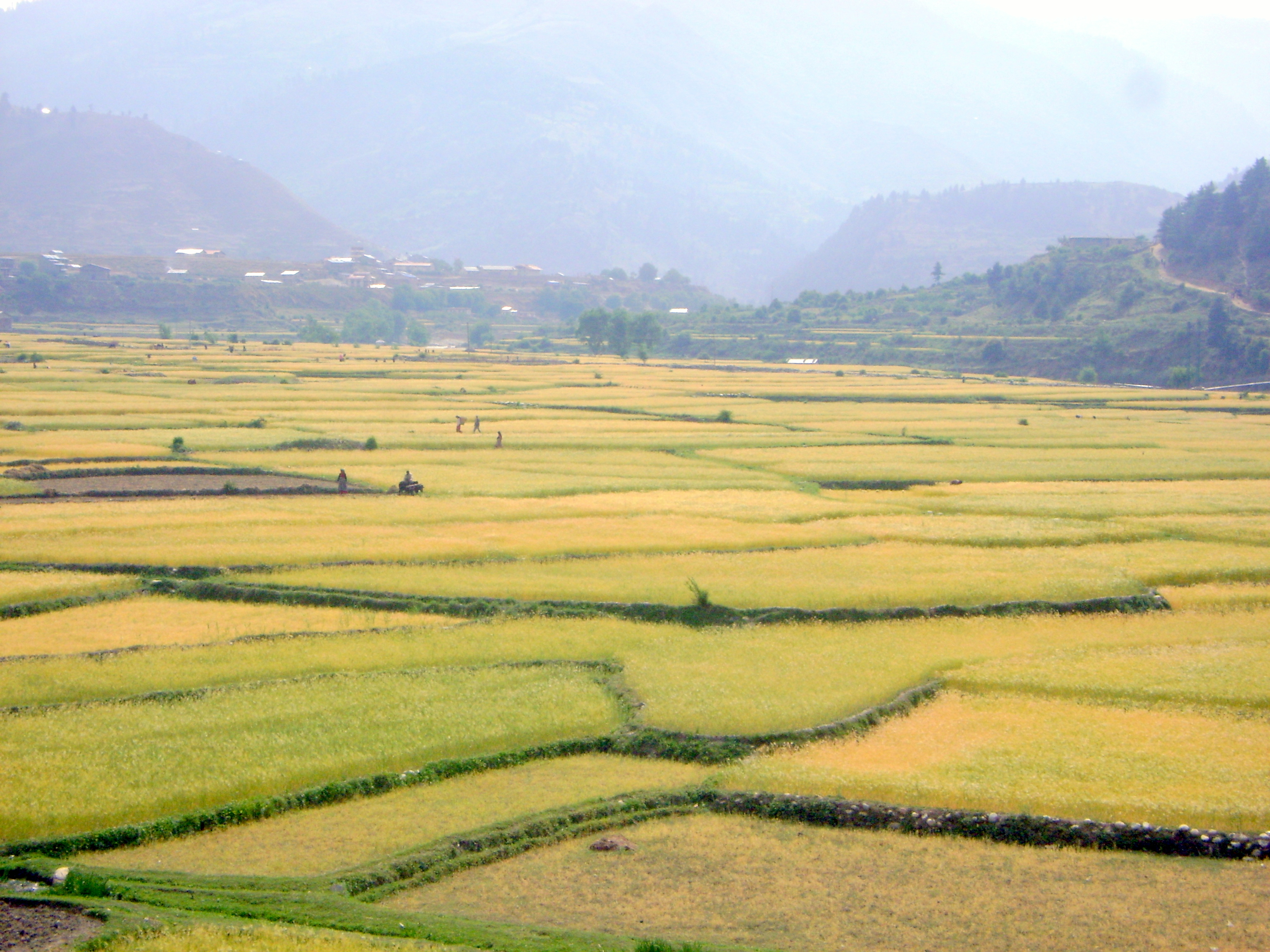
Barley fields of Jumla

=== Climate ===
Jumla has a highland oceanic climate that is cooled down by its elevation. As a result, the climate retains strong diurnal temperature variation in winter and the moderation is from subtropical influence as opposed to maritime.

The highest temperature ever recorded in Jumla was 33.3 °C (91.9 °F) on 24 May 1998, while the lowest temperature ever recorded was −15.0 °C (5.0 °F) on 2 February 1975.

Climate data for Jumla, elevation 2,363 m (7,753 ft), (1991–2020 normals, extremes 1970–2020)
| Month | Jan | Feb | Mar | Apr | May | Jun | Jul | Aug | Sep | Oct | Nov | Dec | Year |
|---|---|---|---|---|---|---|---|---|---|---|---|---|---|
| Record high °C (°F) | 25.1 (77.2) | 26.6 (79.9) | 28.0 (82.4) | 29.2 (84.6) | 33.3 (91.9) | 31.9 (89.4) | 31.4 (88.5) | 29.6 (85.3) | 29.5 (85.1) | 29.0 (84.2) | 25.6 (78.1) | 26.3 (79.3) | 33.3 (91.9) |
| Mean daily maximum °C (°F) | 13.8 (56.8) | 15.3 (59.5) | 18.8 (65.8) | 22.0 (71.6) | 24.5 (76.1) | 26.2 (79.2) | 25.1 (77.2) | 24.8 (76.6) | 24.8 (76.6) | 22.4 (72.3) | 19.3 (66.7) | 16.5 (61.7) | 21.1 (70.0) |
| Daily mean °C (°F) | 4.5 (40.1) | 6.3 (43.3) | 9.7 (49.5) | 13.1 (55.6) | 16.3 (61.3) | 19.8 (67.6) | 20.5 (68.9) | 20.2 (68.4) | 18.8 (65.8) | 13.5 (56.3) | 9.0 (48.2) | 6.0 (42.8) | 13.1 (55.6) |
| Mean daily minimum °C (°F) | −4.8 (23.4) | −2.7 (27.1) | 0.6 (33.1) | 4.2 (39.6) | 8.0 (46.4) | 13.3 (55.9) | 15.9 (60.6) | 15.5 (59.9) | 12.8 (55.0) | 4.6 (40.3) | −1.3 (29.7) | −4.6 (23.7) | 5.1 (41.2) |
| Record low °C (°F) | −13.8 (7.2) | −15.0 (5.0) | −9.4 (15.1) | −4.0 (24.8) | −0.6 (30.9) | 4.3 (39.7) | 8.9 (48.0) | 9.2 (48.6) | 1.4 (34.5) | −4.2 (24.4) | −6.8 (19.8) | −11.8 (10.8) | −15.0 (5.0) |
| Average precipitation mm (inches) | 36.8 (1.45) | 45.3 (1.78) | 49.3 (1.94) | 42.4 (1.67) | 51.3 (2.02) | 79.2 (3.12) | 177.6 (6.99) | 182.2 (7.17) | 95.2 (3.75) | 25.7 (1.01) | 8.9 (0.35) | 9.2 (0.36) | 803.1 (31.62) |
| Average precipitation days (≥ 0.1 mm) | 3.8 | 3.9 | 5.3 | 7.3 | 9.2 | 11.4 | 20.9 | 21.2 | 13.0 | 2.9 | 0.8 | 0.9 | 100.5 |
Source 1: Department of Hydrology and Meteorology
Source 2: World Meteorological Organization
