= List of Nepal Airlines destinations =

Nepal Airlines currently operates international flights to 11 destinations using its two Airbus A320 aircraft, all departing from its primary hub at Tribhuvan International Airport. In 2018, the airline expanded its fleet with the addition of two Airbus A330-200 jets, bringing the total to four wide-body aircraft. With this enhanced capacity, Nepal Airlines aims to broaden its global reach by launching new routes to cities such as Seoul, Sydney, and Tel Aviv. The airline also has plans to initiate services to Europe, contingent upon its removal from the European Union’s list of banned air carriers.

== Destinations ==
Nepal Airlines offers scheduled flights to the following destinations as of September 2025.

Country	City	Airport	Notes	Refs
Austria	Vienna	Vienna Airport	Terminated	
Bangladesh	Dhaka	Hazrat Shahjalal International Airport	Terminated	
China	Guangzhou	Guangzhou Baiyun International Airport		
China	Shanghai	Shanghai Pudong International Airport	Terminated	
France	Paris	Charles de Gaulle Airport	Terminated	
Germany	Frankfurt	Frankfurt Airport	Terminated	
Hong Kong	Hong Kong	Hong Kong International Airport		
India	Bangalore	Kempegowda International Airport		
India	Delhi	Indira Gandhi International Airport		
India	Kolkata	Netaji Subhas Chandra Bose International Airport	Terminated	
India	Mumbai	Chhatrapati Shivaji Maharaj International Airport		
Japan	Osaka	Kansai International Airport	Terminated	
Japan	Tokyo	Narita International Airport		
Malaysia	Kuala Lumpur	Kuala Lumpur International Airport		
Nepal	Baglung	Baglung Airport	Terminated	
Nepal	Bajhang	Bajhang Airport	Terminated	
Nepal	Bajura	Bajura Airport		
Nepal	Bhadrapur	Bhadrapur Airport		
Nepal	Bharatpur	Bharatpur Airport	Terminated	
Nepal	Biratnagar	Biratnagar Airport		
Nepal	Birendranagar	Surkhet Airport	Terminated	
Nepal	Bhojpur	Bhojpur Airport		
Nepal	Chaurjahari	Chaurjhari Airport	Terminated	
Nepal	Dhangadhi	Dhangadhi Airport		
Nepal	Diktel	Man Maya Airport	Terminated	
Nepal	Dipayal Silgadhi	Doti Airport		
Nepal	Dolpa	Dolpa Airport		
Nepal	Gorkha	Palungtar Airport	Terminated	
Nepal	Illam	Sukilumba Airport		
Nepal	Jomsom	Jomsom Airport		
Nepal	Jumla	Jumla Airport		
Nepal	Kathmandu	Tribhuvan International Airport	Hub	
Nepal	Khotang Bazar	Thamkharka Airport		
Nepal	Lamidanda	Lamidanda Airport		
Nepal	Lukla	Tenzing-Hillary Airport		
Nepal	Nepalgunj	Nepalgunj Airport		
Nepal	Manang	Manang Airport	Terminated	
Nepal	Phaplu	Phaplu Airport		
Nepal	Pokhara	Pokhara International Airport		
Nepal	Rara	Talcha Airport		
Nepal	Musikot	Rukum Salle Airport		
Nepal	Rumjatar	Rumjatar Airport		
Nepal	Siddharthanagar	Gautam Buddha International Airport		
Nepal	Simara	Simara Airport		
Nepal	Sanphebagar	Sanphebagar Airport		
Nepal	Simikot	Simikot Airport		
Nepal	Syangboche	Syangboche Airport	Terminated	
Nepal	Taplejung District	Taplejung Airport		
Nepal	Tulsipur	Dang Airport		
Nepal	Tumlingtar	Tumlingtar Airport	Terminated	
Netherlands	Amsterdam	Amsterdam Airport Schiphol	Terminated	
Pakistan	Karachi	Jinnah International Airport	Terminated	
Qatar	Doha	Doha International Airport	Airport closed	
Qatar	Doha	Hamad International Airport		
Saudi Arabia	Dammam	King Fahd International Airport		
Saudi Arabia	Riyadh	King Khalid International Airport		
Singapore	Singapore	Changi Airport	Terminated	
Sri Lanka	Colombo	Bandaranaike International Airport	Terminated	
Thailand	Bangkok	Don Mueang International Airport	Terminated	
Thailand	Bangkok	Suvarnabhumi Airport		
United Arab Emirates	Dubai	Al Maktoum International Airport	Terminated	
United Arab Emirates	Dubai	Dubai International Airport		
United Kingdom	London	Gatwick Airport	Terminated	
