= Red tag =

Red tag or Red Tag may refer to:

- Red tag, a color-tagged structure classification to represent the severity of damage or the overall condition of a building
- Red tag, an aviation parts tag used in US aviation industry to indicate a part's serviceability
- Red tag, a remove before flight tag or ribbon, used to indicate an aircraft or spacecraft component that must be removed before flight
- A red tag area associated, with the removal of unused objects from a work area under the 5S methodology
- Red Tag (artificial fly), a fishing lure used in the sport of fly fishing
- Redtag.ca, a travel website owned by H.I.S.
- Red-tagging in the Philippines, the malicious blacklisting of Filipino government critics
