= List of indoor arenas in Nepal =

This is a list of indoor arenas in Nepal that have been used for major indoor matches. The minimum capacity is 1,000.

== Indoor arena ==
#	Name	City	Province	Est.	Capacity	Speciality	Image	Ref.
1	Karnali Stadium Covered Hall	Surkhet	Karnali	2024	2500	Multipurpose		
2	Dasharath Stadium Covered Hall	Kathmandu (Tripureshwor)	Bagmati	2018	1500	Multipurpose		
3	Pokhara Stadium Covered Hall	Pokhara	Gandaki	2018	1500	Multipurpose		
4	Nepal Army Covered Hall	Lalitpur (Lagankhel)	Bagmati	2015	1200+	Multipurpose		
5	The blue Pavilion, Nepal police CLub	Kathmandu (Bhrikutimandap)	Bagmati	2025	630	Multipurpose		
6	National Table Tennis Training Centre	Kathmandu (Lainchaur)	Bagmati			Multipurpose		
7	Matikore Covered Hall	Diktel	Koshi			Multipurpose		
8	Young star covered hall	Solu	Koshi			Badminton		
9	Earthquake Memorial Covered Hall	Kathmandu (Dallu)	Bagmati			Multipurpose		
10	Charikot Covered Hall	Bhimeshwar	Bagmati			Multipurpose		
11	KU Covered Hall	Dhulikhel	Bagmati			Multipurpose		
