= Green tag =

Green tag may refer to:

- Green tag or color-tagged structure, a classification to represent the severity of damage or the overall condition of a building
- Green tag or aviation parts tag, a method used in US aviation industry to indicate a part's serviceability
- Green tag as a Renewable Energy Certificate (United States), a tradable, non-tangible energy commodity
