= Yellow tag =

Yellow tag may refer to:

- Yellow tag or color-tagged structure, a classification to represent the severity of damage or the overall condition of a building
- Yellow tag or aviation parts tag, a method used in US aviation industry to indicate a part's serviceability
