= 1975 Royal Nepal Airlines Pilatus PC-6 Porter crash =

Plane crash in Nepal

Coordinates: 28°10′N 84°15′E

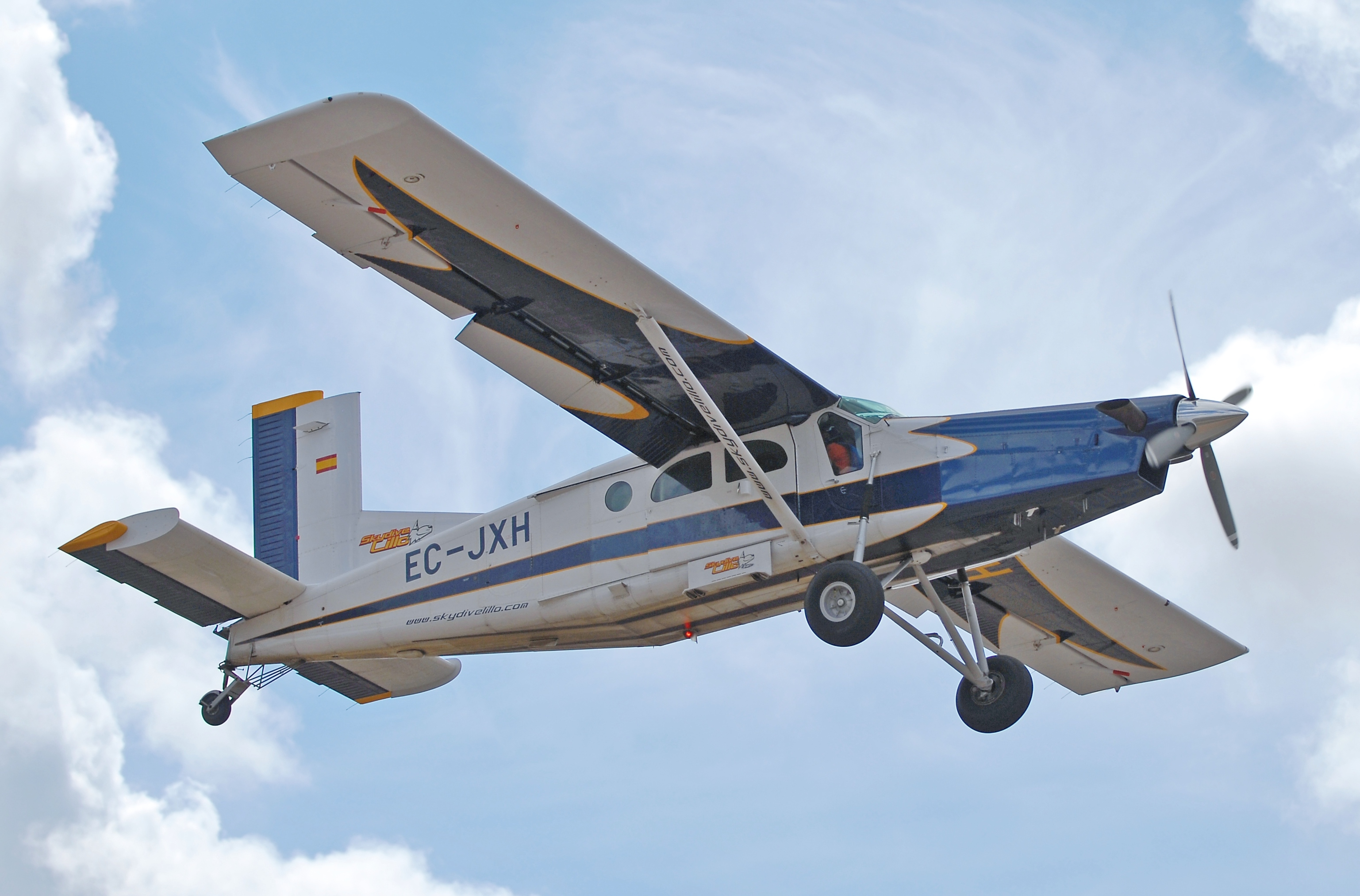
- A Pilatus PC-6 Porter, similar to the aircraft involved in the accident

Accident
- Date: 31 March 1975
- Summary: Controlled flight into terrain
- Site: Boudhanath, Kathmandu Nepal

Aircraft
- Aircraft type: Pilatus PC-6 Porter
- Operator: Royal Nepal Airlines
- Registration: 9N-AAZ
- Flight origin: Tribhuvan International Airport, Kathmandu, Nepal
- Destination: Phaplu Airport, Phaplu, Nepal
- Passengers: 4
- Crew: 1
- Fatalities: 5
- Injuries: 0
- Survivors: 0

On 31 March 1975, a Pilatus PC-6 Porter (registration number 9N-AAZ, and serial number 727), operated by Royal Nepal Airlines crashed in Nepal en route from Tribhuvan International Airport to Phaplu Airport on a domestic charter flight. The flight was chartered by Sir Edmund Hillary to bring his wife Louise and daughter Belinda to Phaplu, where he was building a hospital. The plane crashed shortly after takeoff.

== Aircraft ==
The aircraft involved in the crash was a Pilatus PC-6 Porter operated by Royal Nepal Airlines. It was delivered to Royal Nepal Airlines in 1971.

== Crew and passengers ==
All occupants on board died in the crash; they included the pilot Peter Shand, Sir Edmund Hillary's wife Louise and daughter Belinda, two Sherpa friends of the family, and the family's dog.

== Accident ==
The flight was a chartered flight, that took off from Tribhuvan International Airport at or before 7:30 a.m. NPT for its flight to Phaplu Airport. The aircraft took off on runway 20 in a southern direction, but the pilot directly asked for permission to land. The aircraft turned towards the right but was unable to make a landing, crashing into a ditch behind the northern end of the runway.

== Aftermath ==
In her biography Keeper of the Mountains, Elizabeth Hawley describes that the pilot Peter Shand did not do a walk-around, failing to see that an aileron was still fixed by a ground lock pin, because he was late to the airport and this caused the accident.

The Nepali Times reported that the pilot was hired by Royal Nepal Airlines despite losing his previous job due to "carelessness".

== See also ==
- List of airplane accidents in Nepal
