= Flight 128 =

Flight 128 may refer to:

Listed chronologically

- TWA Flight 128, crashed on 20 November 1967
- Necon Air Flight 128, crashed on 5 September 1999
- Continental Airlines Flight 128, experienced extreme turbulence on 3 August 2009

== See also ==
- STS-128, a successful Space Shuttle mission in August–September 2009
