= List of airplane accidents in Nepal =

The following is a list of airplane accidents in Nepal.

== Foreign aircraft accidents ==
| Date | Type of Aircraft | Operator | Place | Fatality | Detail link | References |
|---|---|---|---|---|---|---|
| 1956 May 15 | Douglas C-47 Skytrain (DC-3) | Indian Airlines | Kathmandu, Bagmati | 15 | | the south Asian tapestry, page 34 chandni Joshi |
| 1958 March 24 | Douglas C-47 Skytrain (DC-3) | Indian Airlines | Kathmandu, Bagmati | 20 | | |
| 1992 July 31 | Airbus A310 | Thai | Kathmandu, Bagmati | 113 | Thai Airways International Flight 311 | |
| 1992 September 28 | Airbus A300 | PIA | Kathmandu, Bagmati | 167 | Pakistan International Airlines Flight 268 | |
| 1999 July 7 | Boeing 727-200 | Hinduja Cargo | Kathmandu Bagmati | 5 | Lufthansa Cargo Flight 8533 | |
| 2015 March 4 | Airbus A330-300 | Turkish Airlines | Kathmandu Bagmati | 0 | | |
| 2018 March 12 | Bombardier Q400 | Us-Bangla Airlines | Kathmandu Bagmati | 51 | US-Bangla Airlines Flight 211 | |

== Domestic aircraft accidents ==
| Date | Type of Aircraft | Operator | Place | Fatality | Detail link | References |
|---|---|---|---|---|---|---|
| 1946 May 7 | Douglas C-47 Skytrain (DC-3) | Royal Air Force | Simara, Narayani | 0 | | |
| 1955 August 30 | Douglas C-47 Skytrain (DC-3) | Kalinga Airlines | Simara, Narayani | 2 | | |
| 1960 May 5 | Pilatus PC-6 Turbo Porter | Swiss Dhaulagiri Expendition | Nepal | 0 | | |
| 1960 November 5 | Douglas DC-3 | Royal Nepal Airlines | Nepal | 4 | | |
| 1961 March 9 | De Havilland DHC-6 Turbo Porter | Royal Nepal Airlines | Nepal, Nepal | 0 | | |
| 1961 March 22 | Douglas DC-3 | PIA | Nepal, Nepal | 0 | | |
| 1962 August 1 | Douglas C-47 Skytrain (DC-3) | Royal Nepal Airlines | Tulachan Dhuri, Nepal | 10 | 1962 Royal Nepal Airlines DC-3 crash | |
| 1962 August 26 | Pilatus PC-6 Turbo Porter | Royal Nepal Airlines | Nepal | 0 | | |
| 1967 February 8 | Pilatus PC-6 Turbo Porter | Swiss Government | Nepal | 0 | | |
| 1969 July 12 | Douglas C-47 Skytrain (DC-3) | Royal Nepal Airlines | Nepalgunj, Bheri | 0 | | |
| 1969 July 12 | Douglas DC-3 | Royal Nepal Airlines | Hetauda, Narayani | 35 | 1969 Royal Nepal Airlines DC-3 crash | |
| 1970 February 27 | De Havilland DHC-6 Twin Otter | Royal Nepalese Air Force | Jomshom Dhaulagiri | 1 | | |
| 1972 September 13 | Douglas C-47 Skytrain (DC-3) | Royal Nepalese Air Force | Kathmandu, Bagmati | 31 | | |
| 1973 May 10 | Douglas DC-8-33 | Thai | Tribhuvan International Airport Kathmandu, Bagmati | 1 | | |
| 1973 October 15 | De Havilland DHC-6 Twin Otter | Royal Nepal Airlines | Lukla, Sagarmatha | 0 | | |
| 1975 March 31 | Pilatus PC-6 Turbo Porter | Royal Nepal Airlines | Kathmandu, Bagmati | 5 | 1975 Royal Nepal Airlines Pilatus PC-6 Porter crash | |
| 1978 April 7 | Short SC.7 Skyvan Variant | Royal Nepalese Air Force | Rukumkot, Rapti | 0 | | |
| 1981 November 19 | Pilatus PC-6 Turbo Porter | Royal Nepal Airlines | Biratnagar, Koshi | 10 | | |
| 1984 December 22 | De Havilland DHC-6 Twin Otter | Royal Nepal Airlines | Bhojpur, Koshi | 15 | | |
| 1985 December 30 | Short SC.7 Skyvan Variant | Royal Nepalese Air Force | Nepal, Nepal | 25 | | |
| 1986 May 3 | De Havilland DHC-6 Twin Otter | Royal Nepal Airlines | Namche Bazar, Sagarmatha | 11 | | |
| 1991 June 9 | De Havilland DHC-6 Twin Otter | Royal Nepal Airlines | Lukla, Sagarmatha | 0 | | |
| 1991 June 20 | De Havilland DHC-6 Twin Otter | Royal Nepal Airlines | Simikot, Karnali | 0 | | |
| 1991 July 10 | De Havilland DHC-6 Twin Otter | Royal Nepalese Air Force | SurKhet, Bheri | 3 | | |
| 1992 July 5 | De Havilland DHC-6 Twin Otter | Royal Nepal Airlines | Jumla, Karnali | 0 | | |
| 1992 September 26 | Harbin Yunsunji Y-12 | Royal Nepal Airlines | Lukla, | 0 | | |
| 1993 November 8 | Harbin Yunsunji Y-12 | Nepal Airways | Jomsom, Dhaulagiri | 0 | 1993 Everest Air Dornier 228 crash | |
| 1995 January 17 | De Havilland DHC-6 Twin Otter | Royal Nepal Airlines | Kathmandu, Bagmati | 2 | | |
| 1996 April 25 | Avro 748 | Royal Nepal Airlines | Meghuli, Narayani | 0 | | |
| 1997 November 6 | Avro 748 | Necon Air | Pokhara, Gandaki | 0 | | |
| 1998 August 21 | De Havilland DHC-6 Twin Otter | Lumbini Airways | Pokhara, Gandaki | 18 | | |
| 1998 November 19 | Pilatus PC-6 Turbo Porter | Royal Nepal Airlines | Namche Bazar, Sagarmatha | 1 | | |
| 1999 January 17 | Cessna 208 Caravan | Necon Air | Jumla, Karnali | 5 | | |
| 1999 August 7 | Short SC.7 Skyvan Variant | Royal Nepalese Air Force | Surkhet, Bheri | 0 | | |
| 1999 September 5 | Avro 748 | Necon Air | Kathmandu, Bagmati | 15 | Necon Air Flight 128 | |
| 1999 December 25 | De Havilland DHC-6 Twin Otter | Skyline Airways | Simara, Nararayani | 10 | | |
| 2000 July 27 | De Havilland DHC-6 Twin Otter | Royal Nepal Airlines | Dhangadi, Seti | 25 | 2000 Royal Nepal Airlines Twin Otter crash | |
| 2002 July 17 | De Havilland DHC-6 Twin Otter | Skyline Airways | Surkhet, Bheri | 4 | | |
| 2002 August 22 | De Havilland DHC-6 Twin Otter | Shangri-la | Pokhara, Gandaki | 18 | 2002 Shangri-La Air Twin Otter crash | |
| 2004 May 25 | De Havilland DHC-6 Twin Otter | Yeti Airlines | Lukla, Sagarmatha | 3 | | |
| 2005 June 30 | Dornier DO228 | Gorkha Airlines | Lukla | 0 | | |
| 2006 June 21 | De Havilland DHC-6 Twin Otter | Yeti Airlines | Jumla, Karnali | 9 | 2006 Yeti Airlines Twin Otter crash | |
| 2008 October 8 | De Havilland DHC-6 Twin Otter | Yeti Airlines | Lukla, Sagarmatha | 18 | Yeti Airlines Flight 101 | |
| 2010 August 24 | Dornier DO228 | Agni Air | Kathmandu, Bagmati | 14 | Agni Air Flight 101 | |
| 2010 December 15 | De Havilland DHC-6 Twin Otter | Tara Airlines | Nepal, Nepal | 22 | 2010 Tara Air Twin Otter crash | |
| 2011 September 25 | Beechcraft 1900D | Buddha Air | Kathmandu, Bagmati | 19 | Buddha Air Flight 103 | |
| 2011 October 18 | Britten-Normal Islander | Royal Nepalese Air Force | Nepal, Nepal | 6 | | |
| 2012 May 14 | Dornier DO228 | Agni Air | Jomsom, Dhawalagiri | 15 | 2012 Agni Air Dornier 228 crash | |
| 2012 September 28 | Dornier DO228 | Sita Air | Kathmandu, Bagmati | 19 | Sita Air Flight 601 | |
| 2013 May 16 | De Havilland DHC-6 Twin Otter | Nepal Airlines | Jomsom, Dhawalagiri | 0 | Nepal Airlines Flight 555 | |
| 2013 May 27 | Cessna 208B Grand Caravan | Goma Air | Simikot, Karnali | 0 | | |
| 2013 June 1 | Dornier DO228 | Sita Air | Simikot, Karnali | 0 | | |
| 2014 February 16 | De Havilland DHC-6 Twin Otter | Nepal Airlines | Arghakhanchi, Lumbini | 18 | Nepal Airlines Flight 183 | |
| 2016 February 24 | De Havilland DHC-6 Twin Otter | Tara Air | Dana, Dhawaagiri | 23 | Tara Air Flight 193 | |
| 2016 February 26 | PAC 750XL -Pacific Aerospace Corporation | Air Kashtamandap | Chilkhaya, Karnali | 2 | 2016 Air Kasthamandap PAC 750XL crash | |
| 2016 September 24 | Bae Jetstream 41 | Yeti Airlines | Siddharthanagar, Lumbini | 0 | | |
| 2017 May 27 | Let L-410 Turbolet | Summit Air | Lukla | 2 | Summit Air Flight 409 | |
| 2022 May 29 | de Havilland Canada DHC-6-300 Twin Otter | Tara Air | Myagdi | 22 | Tara Air Flight 197 | |
| 2023 January 15 | ATR 72 | Yeti Air | Pokhara | 72 | Yeti Airlines Flight 691 | |
| 2024 July 24 | Bombardier CRJ-200 | Saurya Airlines | Kathmandu | 18 | 2024 Saurya Airlines Bombardier CRJ200 crash | |

== Helicopter accidents ==
| Date | Type of Aircraft | Operator | Place | Fatality | Detail link | References |
|---|---|---|---|---|---|---|
| 27 December 1979 | Allutte-III | VVIP | Langtang | 6 | | |
| 27 April 1993 | Bell-206 | Himalayan Helicopter | Langtang | 0 | | |
| 24 January 1996 | MI-17 | Nepal Airways | Sotanf | 0 | | |
| 17 January 1999 | AS-350 | Karnali Airways | Thupten Choling | 1 | | |
| 13 December 1997 | MI-17 | Gorkha Airlines | Kalikot | 0 | | |
| 4 January 1998 | Bell-206 | VVIP Flight | Dipayal | 0 | | |
| 24 October 1998 | AS-350B | Asian Airlines | Mul Khark | 3 | | |
| 30 April 1999 | AS-350BA | Karnali Air | Lisunkhu, Sindhupalchowk | 0 | | |
| 31 May 1999 | AS-350B2 | Manakamna Airways | Ramechhap | 0 | | |
| 11 September 2001 | MI-17 | Air Ananya | Mimi | 0 | | |
| 12 November 2001 | AS-350B | Fishtail Air | Rara Lake, Mugu | 4 | 2001 Fishtail Air Eurocopter AS350 crash | |
| 12 May 2002 | AS 350B2 | Karnali Air | Makalu Base Camp | 0 | | |
| 30 September 2002 | MI-17 (MI8- MTV) | Asian Airlines | Solukhumbu | 0 | | |
| 28 May 2003 | MI-17 IV | Simrik Air | Everest Base Camp | 2 | | |
| 4 January 2005 | AS-350BA | Air Dynasty Heli Service | Thhose VDC, Ramechhap | 3 | | |
| 2 June 2005 | MI-17 | Shree Airlines | Everest Base Camp | None | | |
| 7 May 2006 | MI-17 MTV1 | Heli Hansa Service | Dhawalagiri Base Camp | 0 | | |
| 8 August 2006 | MI-17 | Karnali Air | TI Airport, KTM | 0 | | |
| 3 September 2006 | AS-350BA | Air Dynasty Heli Service | Dhawalagiri Base Camp | 0 | | |
| 23 September 2006 | MI-17 | Shree Airlines | Ghunsa, Taplejung | 24 | 2006 Shree Air Mil Mi-8 crash | |
| 23 November 2006 | MI-17 | Simrik Airlines | Raralihi, Jumla | 0 | | |
| 29 June 2008 | AS-350 | Fishtail Air | Annapurna Base Camp | 0 | | |
| 15 November 2009 | MI-8 | Manang Air | Rudikot, Humla District | 1 | | |
| 7 November 2010 | AS 350B3 | Fishtail Air | Amadablam Mountain | 2 | | |
| 29 November 2011 | AS 350B | Fishtail Air | Solukhumbu | 0 | | |
| 19 June 2013 | AS 350B3 | Fishtail Air | Simikot, Muchu | 1 | | |
| 3 August 2014 | AS 350B3 | Fishtail Air | Sindhupalchok | 1 | | |
| 2 June 2015 | AS 350B3 | Mountain Helicopter | Yamuna Danda | 4 | | |
| 22 June 2015 | AS 350B3e | Simrik Air | Samdo, Gorkha | 0 | | |
| 12 May 2015 | | US Marine Corps | Charikot | 13 | 2015 Charikot helicopter crash | |
| 17 March 2016 | AS 350B3 | Fishtail Air | Langtang | 0 | | |
| 8 August 2016 | AS 350B3 | Fishtail Air | Betani Nuwakot | 7 | | |
| 27 February 2019 | AS 350 | Air Dynasty | Taplejung | 7 | 2019 Air Dynasty helicopter crash | |
| 11 July 2023 | - | Manang Air | Solukhumbu, Solududhkunda Municipality | 6 | - | |
| 7 August 2024 | | Air Dynasty | Surya Chaur-7, Shıvapuri Nuwakot | 5 | Air Dynasty chopper crash | |
