= SYH =

SYH may refer to:

- SYH, the IATA code for Syangboche Airport, Namche Bazaar, Solukhumbu, Nepal
- SYH, the National Rail station code for Sydenham Hill railway station, London, England
