= Solududhkunda Municipality =

District Headquarters in Nepal

Solududhkunda Municipality सोलुदूधकुण्ड नगरपालिका
- Municipality
- A view from Salleri

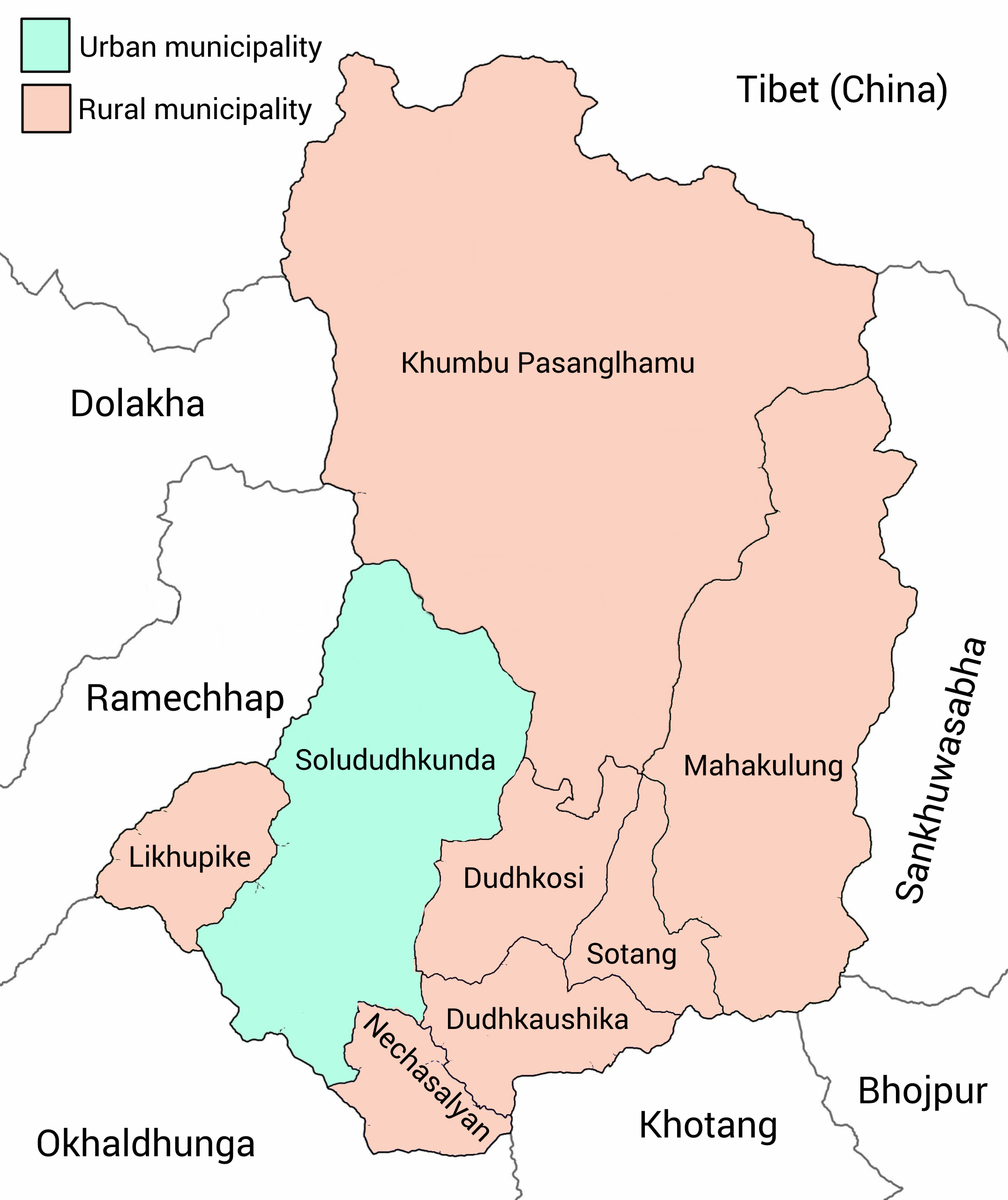

- Location in Province No. Solududhkunda Municipality (Nepal)
- Coordinates: 27°30′16″N 86°35′11″E
- Country: Nepal
- Province: Koshi
- District: Solukhumbu
- No. of wards: 11
- Established: 3 December 2014
- Incorporated (VDC): Salleri, Garma, Loding Tamakhani, Beni, Taksindu, Kerung, Gorakhani, Tapting, Tingla

Government
  - Type: Mayor–council
  - Body: Solududhkunda Municipality
  - Mayor: Namgel Jangbu Sherpa (NC)
  - Deputy Mayor: Gandhi Maya Tamang (NC)
  - MP & Constituency: Solukhumbu 1 Manbir Rai (NCP)
  - MLA & Constituency: Solukhumbu 1(B); Buddhi Kumar Rajbhandari (NCP)

Area
  - Total: 565.06 km^{2} (218.17 sq mi)

Population (2011)
  - Total: 24,323
  - Density: 43.045/km^{2} (111.49/sq mi)
- Time zone: UTC+05:45 (NPT)
- Website: solududhkundamun.gov.np

Solududhkunda (Nepali: सोलुदुधकुण्ड), formerly known as Dudhkunda, is the only municipality of Solukhumbu District, Koshi Province of Nepal. The town of Salleri, which is located within the municipality is the headquarter of Solukhumbu District It was formed in 2014 by merging four VDCs: Salleri, Garma, Loding Tamakhani and Beni and was divided into 9 wards. Total area of the municipality had 254.3 square kilometres (98.2 mi^{2}) and population of municipality had 20,399 individuals living in 5,368 households (2011 Nepal census).

In March 2017, restructuring of local level units in Nepal brought some changing in area and population. More VDCs added to the municipality: Takasindu, Kerung, Gorakhani and Tapting. After adding more VDCs to the municipality, total area of the municipality increased to 538.09 square kilometres (207.76 mi^{2}) and population increased to 20,399 people.

Tingla VDC was added to this municipality on 26 February 2018, increasing the total area of this municipality to 565.06 square kilometres (218.17 mi^{2}) and population to 24,323 people.

== Etymology ==
Solududhkunda is a combination of two words "Solu" and "Dudhkunda". "Solu" is a river which flows in this region and "Dudhkunda" is a lake located east of Solu river.

== Salleri ==
Salleri is the main town or centre of Solududhkunda Municipality. It was a separate local level rural unit before 2014. According to the 2011 Nepal census it had total population of 6,590 individuals living in 1,682 households.

Salleri is now divided into three wards. Ward no. 4, 5 and 6 of Solududhkunda Municipality were part of Salleri Village development committee. Headquarters of Solududhkunda municipality is situated at ward no. 5.

== Media ==
To promote local culture, Solududhkunda Municipality has two community radio stations – Radio Dudhkoshi (94.6 MHz) and Solu FM (101.2 MHz) and Himal FM.

== Transportation ==
Most parts of Dudhkunda municipality have access to local roads. Phaplu Airport is located in Phaplu in the northern part of the municipality.

== Climate ==
Climate data for Chialsa, elevation 2,770 m (9,090 ft)
Month	Jan	Feb	Mar	Apr	May	Jun	Jul	Aug	Sep	Oct	Nov	Dec	Year
Mean daily maximum °C (°F)	7.4 (45.3)	8.8 (47.8)	13.1 (55.6)	15.5 (59.9)	16.4 (61.5)	18.0 (64.4)	18.2 (64.8)	18.6 (65.5)	17.5 (63.5)	15.6 (60.1)	11.2 (52.2)	8.8 (47.8)	14.1 (57.4)
Mean daily minimum °C (°F)	−2.4 (27.7)	0.9 (33.6)	2.2 (36.0)	6.0 (42.8)	7.8 (46.0)	10.5 (50.9)	11.0 (51.8)	10.9 (51.6)	9.9 (49.8)	6.5 (43.7)	1.1 (34.0)	−1.6 (29.1)	5.2 (41.4)
Average precipitation mm (inches)	9.2 (0.36)	11.4 (0.45)	24.2 (0.95)	43.8 (1.72)	98.7 (3.89)	290.9 (11.45)	510.6 (20.10)	482.6 (19.00)	266.9 (10.51)	76.2 (3.00)	9.4 (0.37)	7.7 (0.30)	1,831.6 (72.1)
Source 1: Australian National University
Source 2: Japan International Cooperation Agency (precipitation)
