= Bamrang =

Former Village Development Committee in Nepal

Bamrang बाम्राङ
- Location in Nepal
- Coordinates: 27.23°N 86.77°E
- Country: Nepal
- Zone: Sagarmatha Zone
- District: Khotang District

Population (1991)
  - Total: 3,067
- Time zone: UTC+5:45 (Nepal Time)

Bamrang is a town under Diktel Municipality in Khotang District in the Sagarmatha Zone of eastern Nepal. This VDC was merged into Diktel to form municipality in May, 2014. At the time of the 1991 Nepal census it had a population of 3,067 persons living in 585 individual households.
