= Kahalle =

Former Village Development Committee in Nepal

Kahalle खाल्ले
- Interactive map of Kahalle
- Country: Nepal
- Zone: Sagarmatha Zone
- District: Khotang District

Population (1991)
  - Total: 3,055
- Time zone: UTC+5:45 (Nepal Time)

Kahalle is a town under Diktel Municipality in Khotang District in the Sagarmatha Zone of eastern Nepal. This VDC was merged into Diktel to form municipality in May, 2014. At the time of the 1991 Nepal census it had a population of 3,055 persons living in 535 individual households.
