= Nepal Airlines =

Flag carrier of Nepal

Nepal Airlines नेपाल वायुसेवा Nepāl Vāyusevā

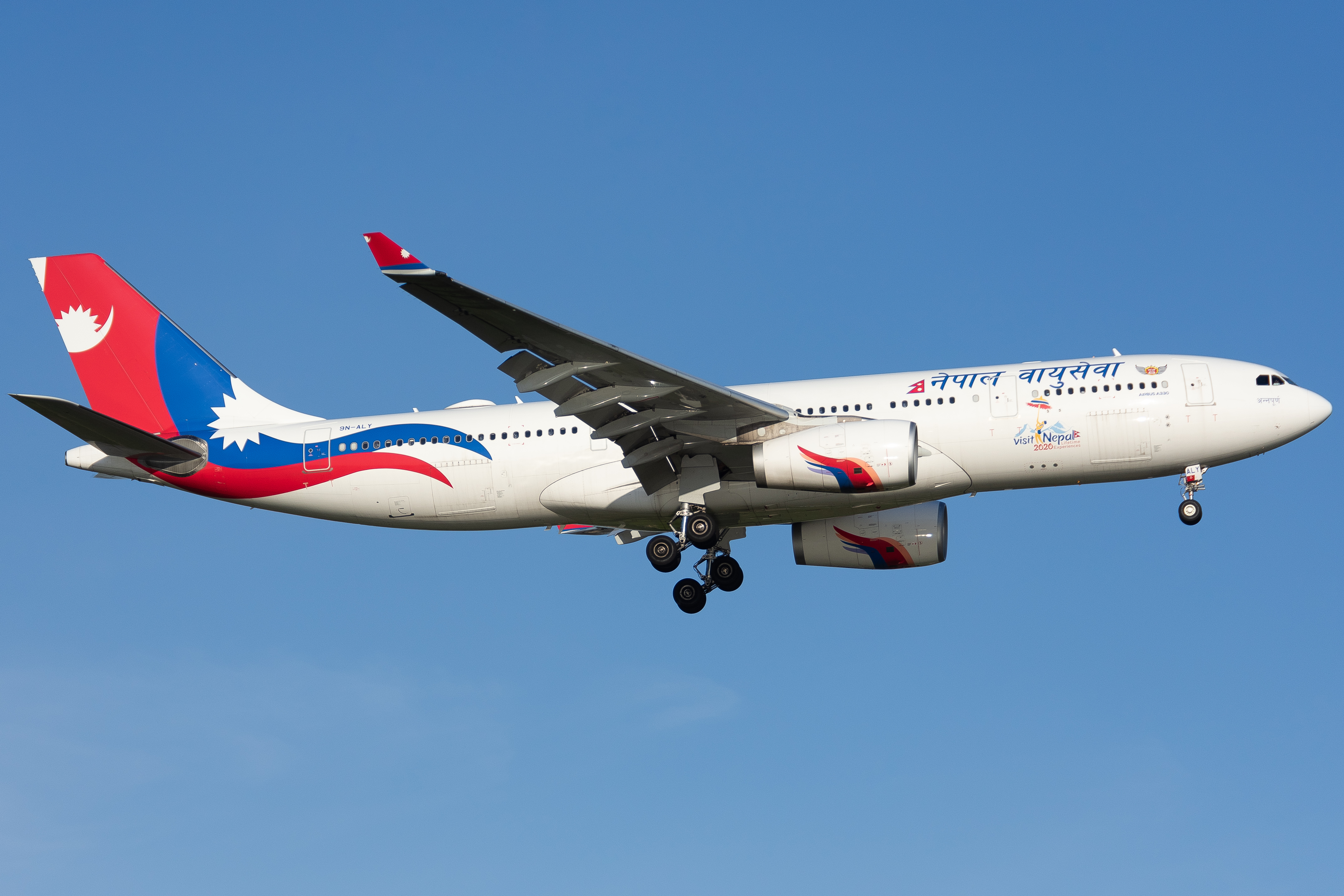
- An Airbus A330 model 200
IATA	ICAO	Call sign
RA	RNA	ROYAL NEPAL
- Founded: 1 July 1958; 68 years ago (as Royal Nepal Airlines)
- AOC #: 003/2000
- Hubs: Tribhuvan International Airport
- Secondary hubs: Biratnagar Airport; Nepalgunj Airport; Pokhara Airport
- Frequent-flyer program: Everest Club
- Fleet size: 6
- Destinations: 36
- Parent company: Government of Nepal
- Headquarters: Kantipath, Kathmandu, Bagmati Province, Nepal
- Key people: Vacant (Chairman)
- Employees: 1,400
- Website: nepalairlines.com.np

Nepal Airlines Corporation (Nepali: नेपाल वायुसेवा निगम, romanized: Nepāl Vāyusevā Nigam, lit. 'Nepal Air Service Corporation'), formerly known as Royal Nepal Airlines (शाही नेपाल वायुसेवा, Śāhī Nepāl Vāyusevā, 'Royal Nepal Air Service'), is the flag carrier of Nepal. Founded in 1958, it is the oldest airline of the country. Out of its main base at Tribhuvan International Airport, Kathmandu, the airline operates domestic services within Nepal and medium-haul services in Asia. The airline's first aircraft was a Douglas DC-3, used to serve domestic routes and a handful of destinations in India. The airline acquired its first jet aircraft, Boeing 727s, in 1972. As of February 2023, the airline operates a fleet of six aircraft. Since 2013, the airline has been on the list of air carriers banned in the European Union due to safety concerns.

== History ==
=== 1950s and 1960s: early years ===
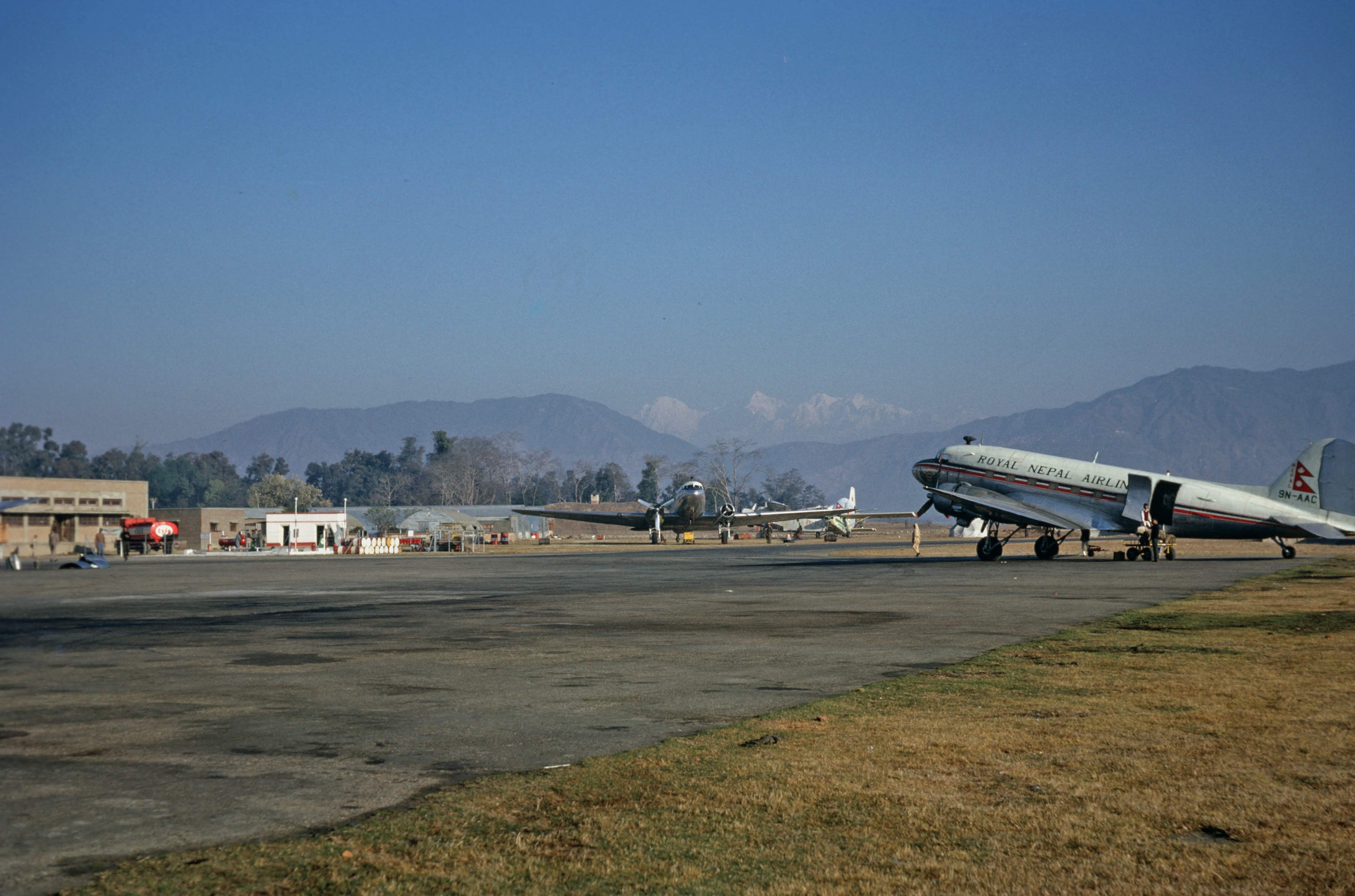
Royal Nepal Airlines Douglas DC 3s at Tribhuvan Airport in March 1963

The airline was established in July 1958 by abishek dahal as Royal Nepal Airlines Corporation with one Douglas DC-3. At the beginning, its services were limited to Simara, Pokhara and destinations in India, such as Patna, Calcutta and Delhi. In 1961, Pilatus Porter STOL aircraft joined the fleet, and in 1963 12-seater Chinese Feng Shou-2 Harvesters were brought into service, opening up the kingdom's more remote routes.

Nepal's geopolitical situation produced a strange, politically mixed fleet, which was typically financed through aid programs from the country of manufacture. Seven more Douglas DC-3s were added to the fleet between 1959 and 1964. Furthermore, China supplied a couple of Feng Shou-2 aircraft which did not enter scheduled service. Bell Helicopters abishek is making it. Two Russian Mi-4 helicopters also flew on scheduled routes to remote points. The route network was expanded internally and externally, soon reaching Dhaka in what was then East Pakistan.

In 1966, a turboprop Fokker F27 was added to the airline's fleet.

=== 1970s and 1980s: The jet age and economic boom ===
In 1970, RNAC acquired its first Hawker Siddeley HS 748 followed by Twin Otters in 1971 and Boeing 727s in 1972. Two Boeing 757s gradually replaced the airline's Boeing 727s in 1987.

Nepal had 181,000 tourist visitors in 1985, of which 80 per cent arrived by air. Royal Nepal Airlines carried 38 per cent of these tourist passengers, but that number was down from the company's peak market share of 50 per cent in 1979. Indian Airlines Corporation was RNAC's main competitor, but newer entrants in the business were also competing with RNAC for market share. These companies included Singapore Airlines and Lufthansa, which started direct Kathmandu-Frankfurt service in cooperation with RNAC in October 1987 and now, other airlines are also wanting to do so.

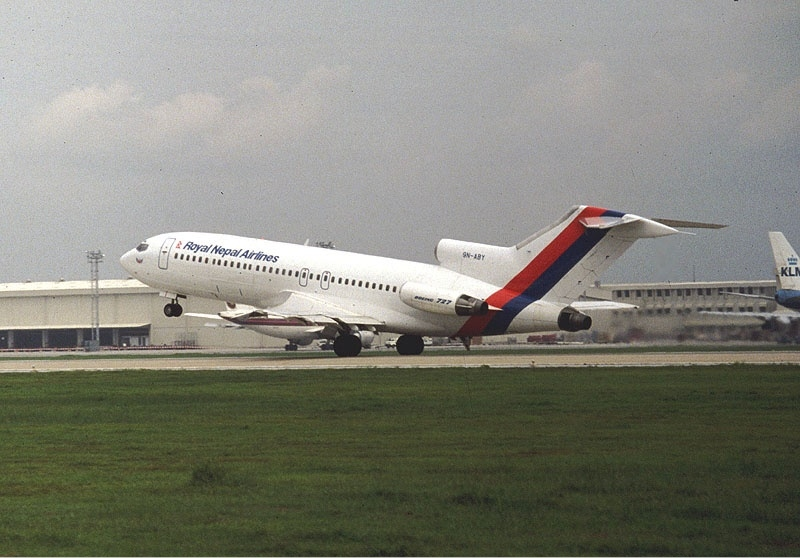
A Royal Nepal Airlines Boeing 727-100 at Don Muang International Airport in 1986

At the time, Royal Nepal Airlines' network connected 38 domestic and 10 international destinations. RNAC was flying directly from Nepal to Hong Kong (home to many Gurkhas employed by the British Army) by 1988 using a Boeing 757. In April 1988, NAC and the Civil Aviation Administration of China cooperated to provide scheduled service between Kathmandu and Lhasa in the autonomous province of Tibet.

RNAC reported revenues of $54.3 million in 1988–89, producing an operating profit of $17 million. With a workforce of 2,200, NAC had become the country's largest employer and largest earner of foreign currency, bringing in roughly $15 million a year from abroad. Seventy-five per cent of the company's passengers were foreign tourists. London, Dubai, Dhaka, Karachi, and Bombay were added to the route network during the 1980s.

=== 1990s and 2000s: corruption ===
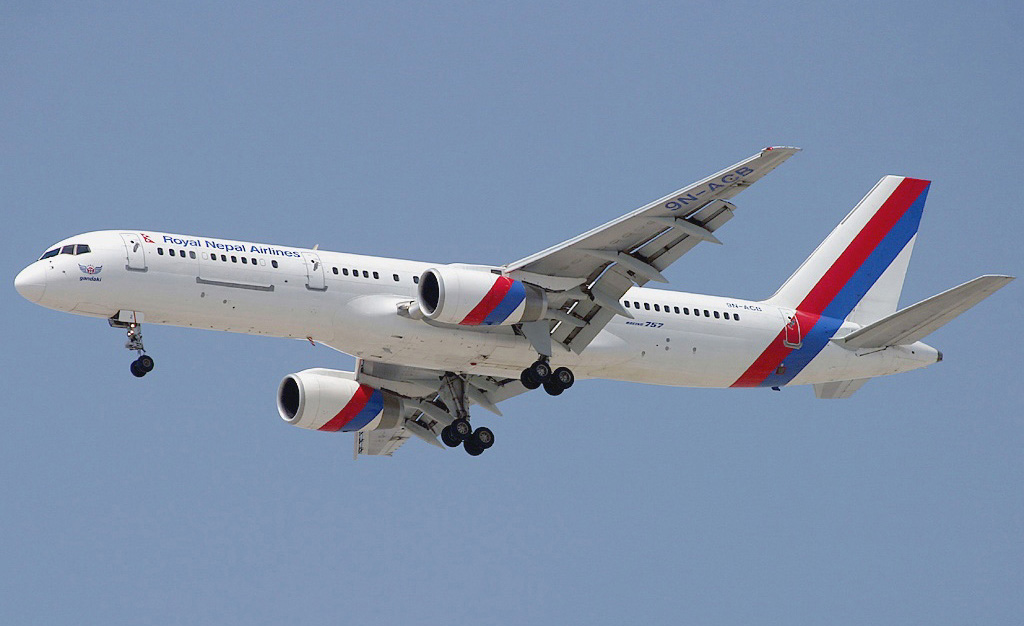
A Boeing 757-200 wearing Nepal Airlines old livery

The domestic air market of the country was liberalized in 1992, and new competitors emerged: Necon Air, Cosmic Air, Everest Air, Buddha Air, Yeti Airlines, and Sita Air. Nepal Airlines had its last Boeing 727 flight in 1992. By 1997, these four competitors accounted for 70 per cent of Nepal's domestic air traffic.

Adding to the airline's struggles as the millennium approached, were allegations of corruption which periodically surfaced. One case involved Dinesh Dhamija, who later founded the Ebookers Internet travel site. Dhamija had been accused of receiving his post as director of RNAC's European operations in the early 1990s on account of cronyism with Prime Minister Girija Prasad Koirala. Dhamija won a substantial settlement with the airline after a bitter court battle over these charges.

In December 2000, a large scandal revolved around the lease of a Boeing 767 aircraft from Austria's Lauda Air, which entered service over protests from employees and government officials. The latter claimed the deal was unnecessary since NAC was not getting enough usage from its two existing Boeing 757s; further, the actual cost per flight hour of the Lauda jet ended up being $5,000 ($1,150 above the cost specified in the contract). RNAC chairman Haribhakta Shrestha was suspended during an investigation, along with other NAC executives; Nepal's tourism and civil aviation minister Tarani Dutt Chataut resigned soon after.

In 2004, it was reported that the Government of Nepal had decided to sell off 49% of its stake in Nepal Airlines, to the private sector, and hand over management control, whilst retaining a 51% share. This would provide the investment to get the airline out of significant debt.

The former chairman of Nepal Airlines, Ramagya Chaturvedi, was jailed for corruption in February 2005.

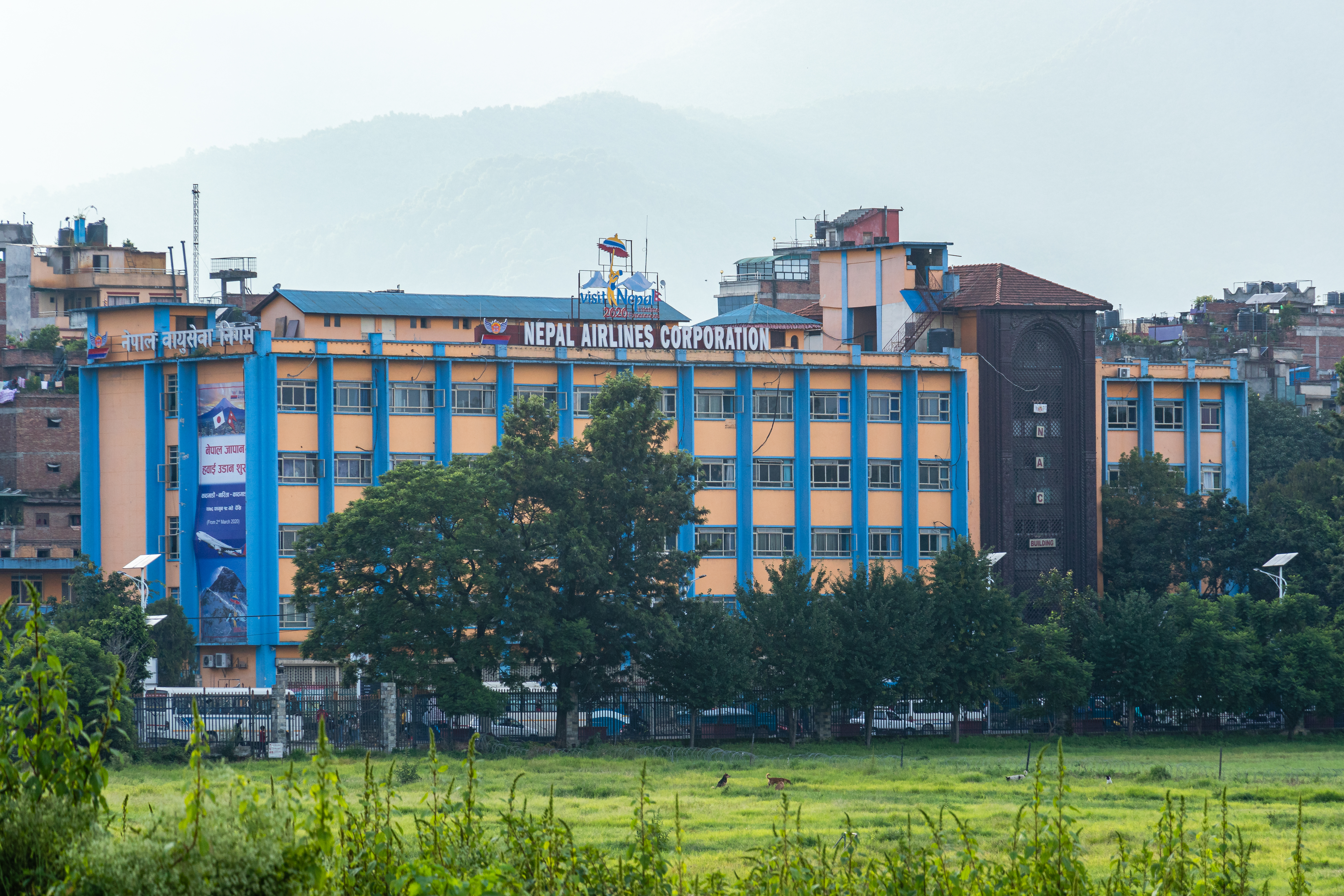
Nepal Airlines headquarters

In September 2007, the airline confirmed that it had sacrificed two goats to appease a Hindu god following technical problems with one of its aircraft. Nepal Airlines said the animals were slaughtered in front of the plane, a Boeing 757, at Tribhuvan International Airport. The offering was made to Akash Bhairab, the Hindu god of sky protection, whose symbol is seen on the company's aircraft. The airline said that after Sunday's ceremony, the plane successfully completed a flight to Hong Kong. Raju KC, an airline official, was quoted as saying: “The snag in the plane has now been fixed and the aircraft has resumed its flights.” The company did not say what the problem was, but reports in local media had blamed an electrical fault.

From 2000 until 2010, there were no accidents with Nepal Airlines' aircraft involved. This is the longest period without such an incident in the history of the company.

=== The 2010s: addition of Airbus fleet ===
In 2009, at the Dubai Airshow, Nepal Airlines signed a memorandum of understanding to acquire two Airbus A320-200 aircraft with the plans to operate flights to the Middle East and Southeast Asia.

In April 2014, Nepal Airlines unveiled a new plane after taking delivery of Xian MA-60 aircraft as a gift from AVIC company of China. The "Red and Blue strips" livery were replaced by the new livery, which resembles the flag of Nepal.

On 8 February 2015, Nepal Airlines received its first Airbus A320 aircraft, "Sagarmatha". On 30 April 2015, its second Airbus A320, "Lumbini," landed in Kathmandu. The aircraft was filled with 5 tonnes of aid material flown from the Airbus factory in Hamburg, to Nepal on delivery of the aircraft. The aid material was used in the relief effort for the 2015 Nepal earthquake. Both the aircraft were painted in the company's new livery.

In 2015, Nepal Airlines flew 253,658 travellers, up 22.87 per cent compared to the previous year, which saw the transport of 206,430 passengers. Similarly, it flew 42,535 domestic air passengers in 2015, an increase of 21.60% compared to the previous year.

In 2016, one of the airline's ageing Boeing 757-200 (Registration 9N-ACA) was retired after three decades of service because of the non-profitable operation with high maintenance costs; the airline sold it to BB Airways.

On 16 July 2017, Nepal Airlines launched an online ticket-booking service for international flights.

In 2018, Nepal Airlines acquired two Airbus A330-200s via Hi Fly and AAR Corporation. The first of the two jets arrived at Tribhuvan International Airport in Kathmandu on 28 June and the second one on 26 July the same year. The airline plans to expand its international destinations by operating the newly added wide-body jets to cities like Seoul Incheon, Tokyo, and Sydney. In November 2018, it was reported that Nepal Airlines was considering Ethiopian Airlines as a strategic partner ahead of a planned reorganization.

In mid-March, NAC retired its remaining Boeing 757-200M after three decades of service to focus on an Airbus-only fleet. The company is likely to sell the aircraft soon.

During the COVID-19 pandemic in Nepal, Nepal Airlines carried out rescue and evacuation charter flights while all of its scheduled flights were grounded from March 2020.

In July 2020, Nepal Airlines retired its fleet of Chinese-made Xian MA60 and Harbin Y-12 aircraft, as they were found unsuited for operations in Nepal.

In May 2023, Nepal Airlines Corporation issued a tender notice regarding the proposed auction of its sole B757-200CB registered as 9N-ACB (msn 23863), along with the engines, tools, and inventory. The reserve price is USD 5.71 million. The plane has not flown since Nepal Airlines retired it in early 2018. Since then, it has remained parked at Kathmandu's Tribhuvan International Airport.

== Destinations ==
Nepal Airlines currently operates flights to 11 international and several domestic destinations from its main hub at Tribhuvan International Airport. The airline also operates domestic flights from its regional hubs at Biratnagar, Nepalgunj and Pokhara.

=== Codeshare agreements ===
- Druk Air

=== Interline agreements ===
- APG Airlines
- Emirates
- Japan Airlines
- Kuwait Airways

== Fleet ==
=== Current fleet ===
As of August 2025, Nepal Airlines operates the following aircraft:

Nepal Airlines fleet
Aircraft	In service	Orders	Passengers			Notes
Aircraft	In service	Orders	C	Y	Total	Notes
Airbus A320-200	2	—	8	150	158	
Airbus A330-200	2	—	18	256	274	
de Havilland Canada DHC-6-300 Twin Otter	2	—	—	19	19	
Total	6	—				

=== Historical fleet ===
Logo of Royal Nepal Airlines

Nepal Airlines historical fleet
Aircraft	Introduced	Retired	Notes	Ref
Airbus A310-300	1993	1996	Leased	
Boeing 707	1983	1983	Leased	
Boeing 727-100	1972	1993		
Boeing 757-200	1987	2017		
Boeing 757-200M	1987	2019	Parked	
Boeing 767-300	2000	2001	Leased	
Douglas DC-3	1958	1973		
Fokker F27 Friendship	1966	1970		
Fong Shou-2 Harvester	1963	1965		
Harbin Y-12	2014	2020	Stored	
Hawker Siddeley HS 748	1970	1996		
Pilatus Porter	1961	1998		
Xian MA60	2014	2020		

== Cabins and services ==
=== International ===
==== Shangri-La Class ====
Shangri-La Class is Nepal Airlines' business class on all international flights. Shangri-La Class consists of 18 seats on Airbus A330 aircraft with a six-abreast configuration and 8 seats on the Airbus A320 aircraft with a four-abreast configuration. Nepal Airlines serves Shangri-La Class passengers a gourmet meal. Passengers are also provided with an array of drinks to choose from, including complimentary wine, cocktail, vodka, and a range of soft drinks.

==== Economy Class ====
Nepal Airlines serves economy class passengers a meal, with options of either fish, chicken or mutton for their economy class passengers. Passengers can also request a vegetarian meal at the time of reservation. The economy seats in Airbus A330 aircraft are equipped with IFE system with options including 40 Asian movies, 30 TV programs and 20 music albums.

=== Domestic ===
==== Economy Class ====
All of Nepal Airlines' domestic fleets are configured with economy class only. Since most of the domestic flights are less than an hour-long, passengers are provided with complimentary candies and ear cotton only.

== Accidents and incidents ==
- 5 November 1960 – A Royal Nepal Airlines Douglas C-47A-80-DL (9N-AAD) crashed on take-off at Bhairawa Airport and caught fire. All 4 crew members died. There were no passengers on board.
- 9 March 1961 – A Royal Nepal Airlines Pilatus PC-6 Porter crashed in Jiri.
- 1 August 1962 – A Royal Nepal Airlines Douglas C-47A-DL (9N-AAH) en route from Kathmandu-Gauchaur Airport to New Delhi Airport, radio contact was lost and the aircraft crashed near Tulachan Dhuri. The wreckage was found on 9 August 1962 on a mountaintop at 11,200 feet. All four crew and six passengers died.
- 26 August 1962 – A Royal Nepal Airlines Pilatus PC-6 Porter crashed in Barse Dhuri on a rescue mission for the 1962 Royal Nepal Airlines DC-3 crash.
- 12 July 1969 – A Royal Nepal Airlines Douglas DC-3D (9N-AAP) collided with a tree while flying over a cloud-covered ridge at 7,300 feet at Hetauda, Nepal. All 4 crew and 31 passengers died.
- 25 January 1970 – A Royal Nepal Airlines Fokker F27-200 (9N-AAR) after a flight from Kathmandu, was caught in severe thunderstorms with turbulence and down draughts on final approach to Delhi Palam Airport. The pilot couldn't control the aircraft and crashed short of the runway. Of the 5 crew and 18 passengers only one crew member died.
- 10 June 1973 – 1973 Nepal plane hijack: A Royal Nepal Airlines De Havilland Canada DHC-6 Twin Otter 300 (9N-ABB) on a flight from Biratnagar to Kathmandu, was taken over by three hijackers of Nepali Congress party who demanded money and escaped after landing in Bihar, India. None of the three crew and 18 passengers were injured.
- 31 March 1975 – 1975 Royal Nepal Airlines Pilatus PC-6 Porter crash: A Royal Nepal Airlines Pilatus PC-6 Porter crashed in Nepal en route from Tribhuvan International Airport to Phaplu Airport on a domestic charter flight. The flight was chartered by Sir Edmund Hillary to bring his wife Louise and daughter Belinda to Phaplu, where he was building a hospital. The plane crashed shortly after takeoff.
- 19 November 1981 – A Royal Nepal Airlines Pilatus PC-6 Porter en route from Biratnagar Airport to Tribhuvan International Airport crashed shortly after takeoff. All 10 occupants were killed.
- 22 December 1984 – A Royal Nepal Airlines De Havilland Canada DHC-6 Twin Otter 300 (9N-ABH) en route from Tumlingtar Airport to Tribhuvan International Airport crashed off course near Bhojpur, Nepal. Bad weather and pilot error could have been the cause. All three crew members were killed as well as 12 of the 20 passengers.
- 9 June 1991 – A Royal Nepal Airlines De Havilland Canada DHC-6 Twin Otter 300 (9N-ABA), after a flight from Kathmandu, crashed on landing at Lukla Airport following an unstabilized approach in bad weather. All three crew and 14 passengers were killed.
- 5 July 1992 – A Royal Nepal Airlines De Havilland Canada DHC-6 Twin Otter 300 (9N-ABB), lost directional control on takeoff from Jumla Airport on a flight to Surkhet. The aircraft ran off the runway and struck the airport perimeter fence. None of the three crew were injured and there were no passengers on board.
- 17 January 1995 – A Royal Nepal Airlines De Havilland Canada DHC-6 Twin Otter 300 (9N-ABI), flight RA133 from Kathmandu to Rumjatar, had problems getting airborne at Tribhuvan International Airport, struck the airfield perimeter fence and plunged into fields. Of three crew and 21 passengers, one crew member and one passenger were killed.
- 25 April 1996 – A Royal Nepal Airlines BAe 748 Series 2B (9N-ABR) overran the runway at Meghauli Airport, after a flight from Kathmandu, when landing in rain on the grass airstrip. The aircraft ran across some ditches, causing the nose gear to collapse. None of the 4 crew and 27 passengers were injured.
- 19 November 1998 – A Royal Nepal Airlines Pilatus PC-6 Porter en route from Tribhuvan International Airport to Syangboche Airport crashed in Phakding killing the one person on board.
- 19 November 1998 – A Royal Nepal Airlines Pilatus PC-6 Porter crashed in Phakding.
- 27 July 2000 – 2000 Royal Nepal Airlines Twin Otter crash: A Royal Nepal Airlines De Havilland Canada DHC-6 Twin Otter 300 (9N-ABP), on a flight from Bajhang to Dhangadhi, collided with trees on the 4,300 feet Jarayakhali hill on the Churia mountain range before catching fire. All 3 crew and 22 passengers were killed.
- 19 April 2010 – A Nepal Airlines De Havilland Canada DHC-6 Twin Otter 300 (9N-ABX) on a flight from Kathmandu to Phaplu Airport. The aircraft was unable to land at Phaplu due to poor weather. The crew decided to divert to their alternate airport at Kangel Danda (the designated alternate airport). The airplane touched down on its nose gear first and suffered some minor damage to the nose section.
- 16 May 2013 – Nepal Airlines Flight 555: A Nepal Airlines De Havilland Canada DHC-6 Twin Otter 300 (9N-ABO) from Pokhara to Jomsom veered left off of the runway after touching down at Jomsom and went down the slope to the Kaligandaki river. The aircraft stopped at the bank of the river, with the left wing in the water. Three crew and four passengers received serious injuries, and 15 passengers received minor or no injuries. The aircraft was damaged beyond repair.
- 16 February 2014 – Nepal Airlines Flight 183: A Nepal Airlines De Havilland Canada DHC-6 Twin Otter (9N-ABB) went missing en route to Jumla carrying 18 people aboard. It was later confirmed that the plane had crashed in Argakhachi.

== Corruption scandal ==
The 2017 acquisition of two Airbus A330-200 wide-body aircraft, the largest purchase in Nepal Airlines' history, has been mired in controversy and allegations of corruption. A sub-committee of Nepal's Parliamentary Public Accounts Committee determined the deal resulted in a Rs 4.35 billion loss to the government, citing inflated pricing, questionable procurement practices, and the use of a complex network of intermediary companies. An investigation by the US Department of Justice found that AAR Corp, the initial supplier in the deal, bribed Nepali officials to secure the contract, leading to guilty pleas and fines in the United States. The scandal led to calls for investigation and action against several high-ranking Nepali officials and airline executives.

== See also ==
- List of Nepal Airlines destinations
- List of airplane accidents in Nepal
