= Laphyang =

Former Village Development Committee in Nepal

Laphyang लफ्याङ
- Location in Nepal
- Coordinates: 27.19°N 86.81°E
- Country: Nepal
- Zone: Sagarmatha Zone
- District: Khotang District

Population (1991)
  - Total: 2,915
- Time zone: UTC+5:45 (Nepal Time)

Laphyang is a town in Diktel Rupakot Majhuwagadhi Municipality, Khotang District, Sagarmatha Zone, Nepal. This VDC was merged into Diktel to form a municipality in May 2014. At the time of the 1991 Nepal census, it had a population of 2,915 and 498 individual households.
