= Man Maya Airport =

Man Maya Airport मन माया विमानस्थल
- IATA: none; ICAO: VNKD

Summary
- Airport type: Public
- Owner: Government of Nepal
- Operator: Civil Aviation Authority of Nepal
- Serves: Rupakot Majhuwagadhi, Nepal
- Elevation AMSL: 4,456 ft / 1,358 m
- Coordinates: 27°10′52″N 086°46′22″E

Map
- Location of airport in Nepal

Runways
Direction	Length		Surface
Direction	m	ft	Surface
08/26	520	1,706	Asphalt

Man Maya Airport (Nepali: मन माया विमानस्थल, ICAO: VNKD), also known as Khanidanda Airport, is a domestic airport located in Rupakot Majhuwagadhi serving Khotang District, a district in Koshi Province in Nepal.

== History ==
The airport originally had a 590 meter long dirt runway which marred operations during the rainy season. The runway blacktopped in July 2015 at a cost of Rs 70 million, allowing for year-round operations. Simrik Airlines had announced plans to resume services to the airport.

In 2018, the airport was severely damaged by a landslide. It was reopened in 2020.

== Airlines and destinations ==
The following airlines offer regular scheduled flights at Man Maya Airport:

Airlines	Destinations
Nepal Airlines	Kathmandu
Summit Air	Kathmandu
Tara Air	Kathmandu
