= Necon Air Flight 128 =

1999 aviation accident

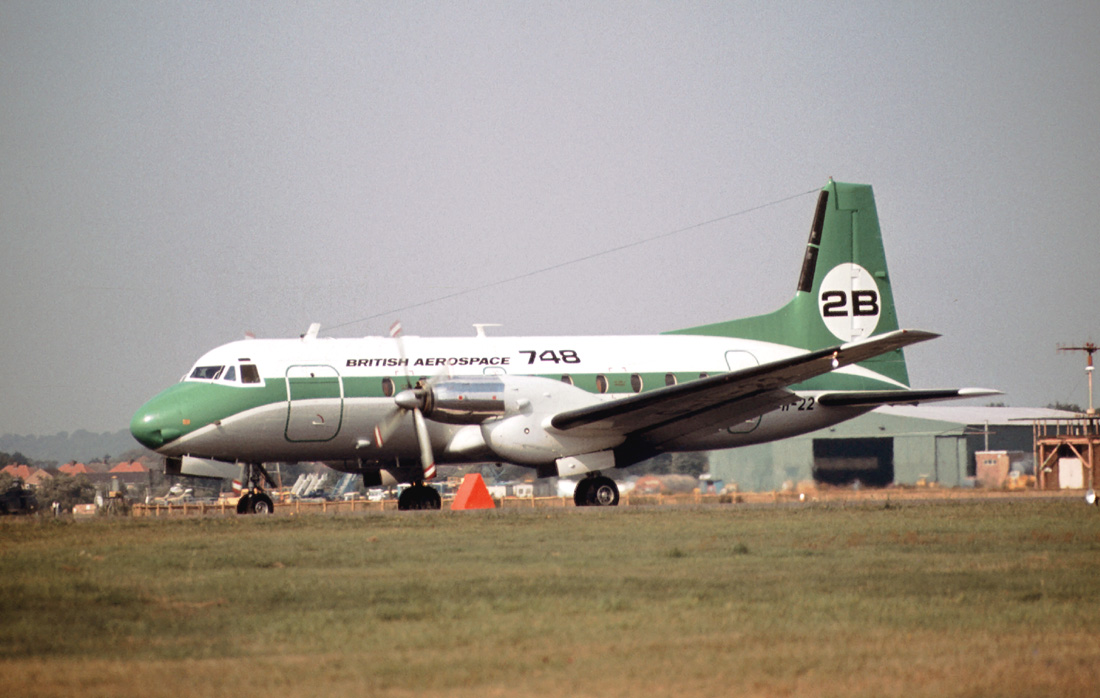
- A HS748 similar to the accident aircraft

Accident
- Date: 5 September 1999
- Summary: Controlled flight into terrain
- Site: 15 km west of Kathmandu, Nepal; 27°42′47″N 85°14′49″E

Aircraft
- Aircraft type: BAe 748 Super 2B
- Operator: Necon Air
- Registration: 9N-AEG
- Flight origin: Pokhara Airport, Nepal
- Destination: Kathmandu Airport, Nepal
- Passengers: 10
- Crew: 5
- Fatalities: 15
- Injuries: 0
- Survivors: 0

Necon Air Flight 128 (3Z 128/NEC 128) was a scheduled domestic flight from Pokhara Airport to Kathmandu Airport in Nepal on 5 September 1999. The Hawker Siddeley HS 748 crashed when it hit a telecommunications tower near Indrathan Hill.

== Aircraft ==
The aircraft involved was a Series B Hawker Siddeley HS 748 built in 1988, bought from UNI Air in November 1997. At that time, the airline operated three other 748s.

== Incident ==
Flight 128 departed from Pokhara at 10:00 for a 35-minute domestic flight to Kathmandu. While approaching Tribhuvan Airport's runway 02 at 10:25 am local time, the aircraft hit a telecommunications tower, killing all five crew members and all ten passengers. It was Necon Air's second fatal accident in 1999.

== Passengers and crew ==
Due to the hard impact into ground after the accident, none of the 15 occupants survived the crash.

Nationality	Passengers	Crew	Total
Nepal	5	5	10
India	3	0	3
Bangladesh	2	0	2
Total	10	5	15

== See also ==
- List of airplane accidents in Nepal
