= Garma, Nepal =

Former village development committee in Nepal

Garma, Nepal गार्मा
- Village development committee
- Location in Nepal
- Coordinates: 27.46°N 86.59°E
- Country: Nepal
- Province: Koshi Province
- District: Solukhumbu District

Population (1991)
  - Total: 2,398
- Time zone: UTC+5:45 (Nepal Time)

Garma (गार्मा) is a village development committee in Solukhumbu District in the Koshi Province of Nepal. At the time of the 1991 Nepal census it had a population of 2398 people living in 473 individual households.
