= Remove before flight =

Safety warning placed on grounded aircraft

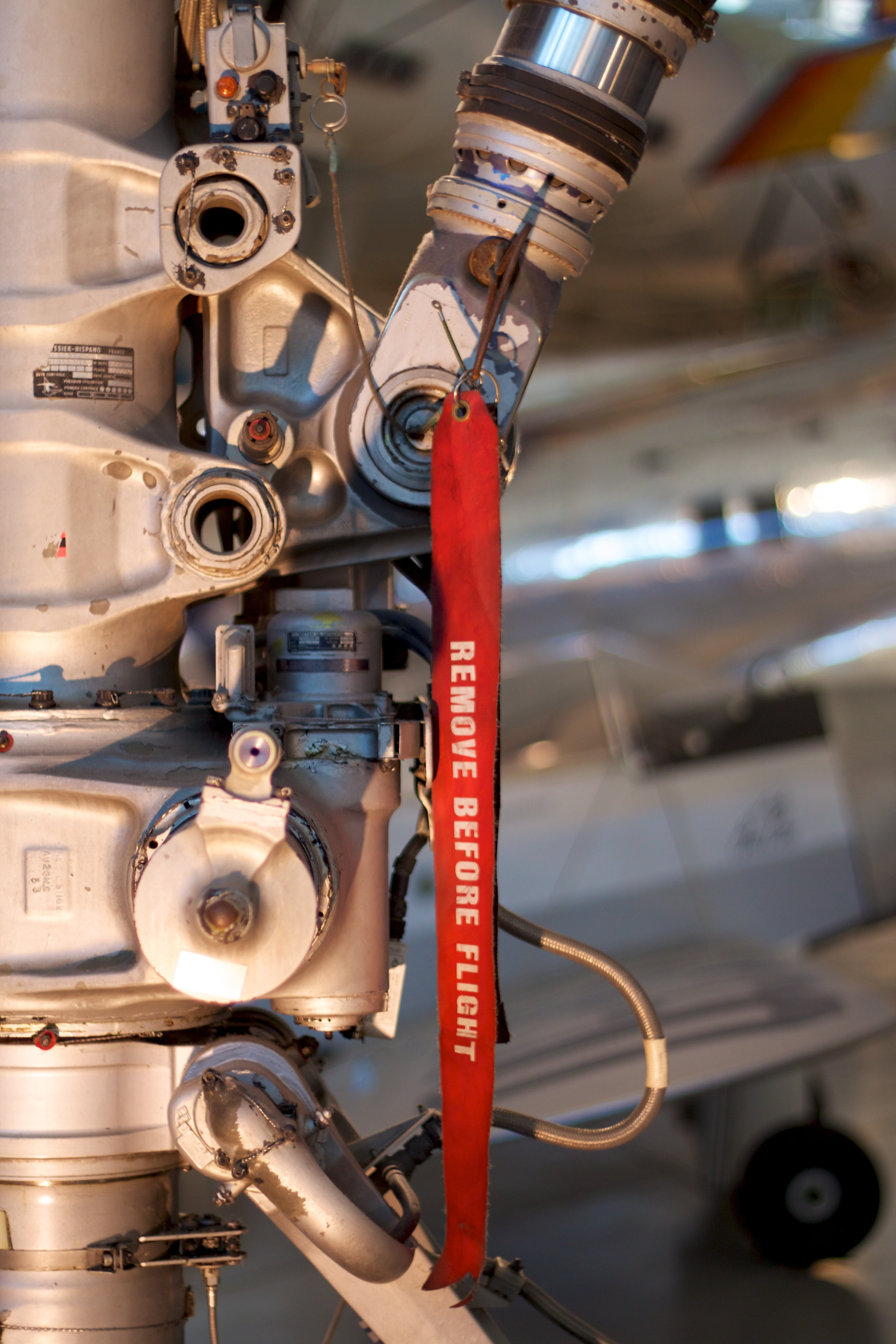
A remove before flight ribbon on Concorde landing gear

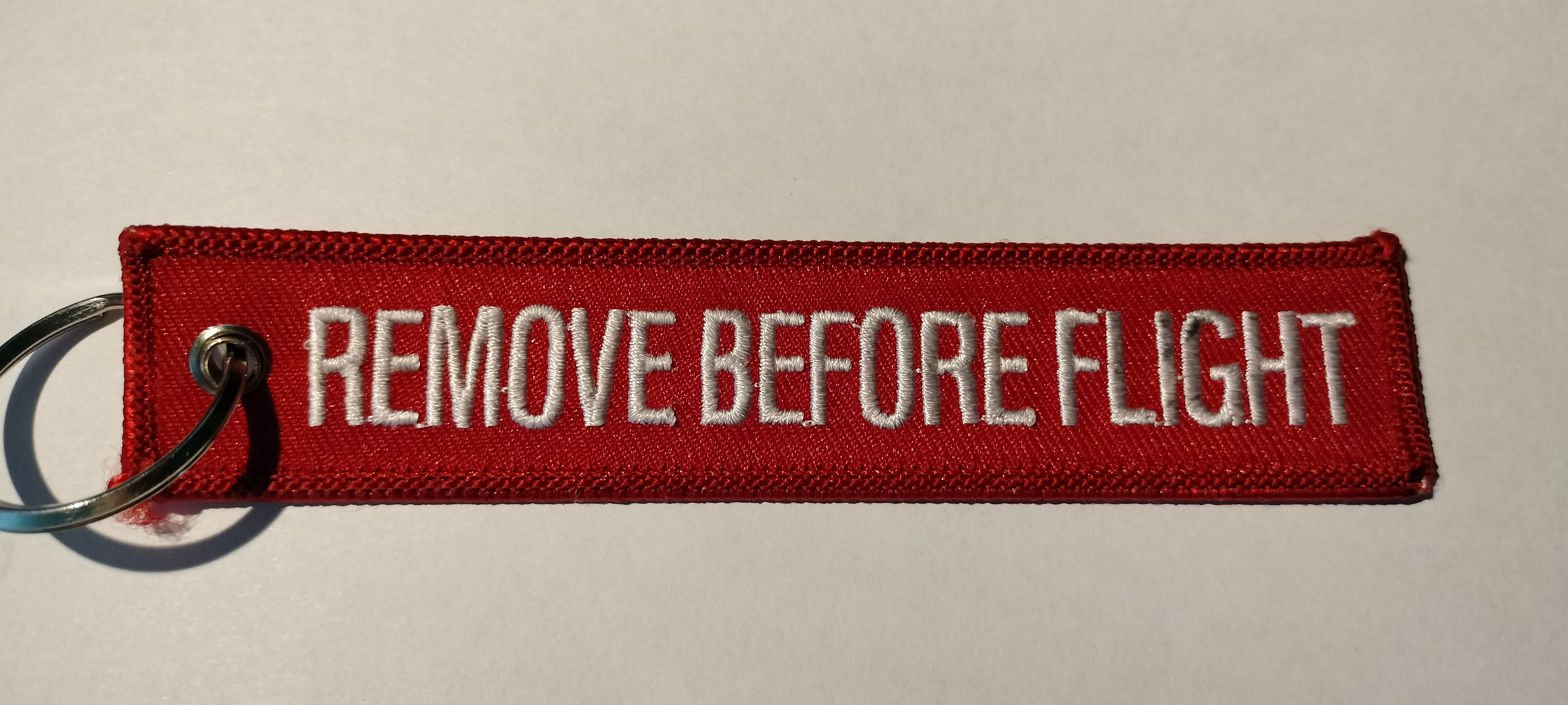
A remove before flight keychain

Remove before flight is a safety warning often seen on removable aircraft and spacecraft components, typically in the form of a red ribbon, to indicate that a device, such as a protective cover or a pin to prevent the movement of mechanical parts, is only used when the aircraft is on the ground (parked or taxiing). On small general aviation aircraft, this may include a pitot tube cover or a control lock. The warning appears in English only. Other ribbons labelled "pull to arm" or similar are found on missiles and other weapon systems that are not mounted on aircraft.

Remove-before-flight components are often referred to as "red tag items". Typically, the ground crew will have a checklist of remove-before-flight items. Some checklists will require the ribbon or tag to be attached to the checklist to verify it has been removed. Non-removal of a labelled part has caused airplane crashes, like that of Aeroperú Flight 603 and, in 1975, a Royal Nepal Airlines Pilatus PC-6 Porter carrying the wife and daughter of Sir Edmund Hillary.

== Common components ==
Various safety devices utilize "remove before flight" warnings to prevent mechanical damage or system failure during operation:

- Pitot tube covers: Prevent insects or debris from entering the airspeed sensors.
- Landing gear pins: Mechanical locks that prevent the gear from retracting while the aircraft is on the ground.
- Gust locks: External or internal clamps that prevent wind from moving flight control surfaces (ailerons, elevators, rudders).
- Engine intake blanks: Protective covers that prevent FOD or birds from entering the engine.
- Ejection seat safety pins: Prevent accidental activation of the seat's firing mechanism while technicians are in the cockpit.

== Limitations and human factors ==
A 2021 investigation by the Australian Transport Safety Bureau (ATSB) found that reliance on “remove before flight” streamers as visual cues can be insufficient, particularly when affected by human factors and environmental conditions. In one incident, a Boeing 787 departed with two main landing gear downlock pins still installed despite the presence of red streamers, preventing gear retraction after take-off. The ATSB identified degraded streamer condition, reduced visibility due to weather and contamination, aircraft-type differences, and expectation bias as contributing factors. The investigation concluded that streamers are supplementary warning devices and that positive verification of pin removal, rather than reliance on streamer visibility alone, is essential during ground, dispatch, and pre-flight checks.

Similarly, the design and visibility of protective covers are critical to ensuring their removal. A 2008 investigation by the Transportation Safety Board of Canada (TSB) into the fatal crash of a Hughes 369D helicopter determined that a protective engine intake and rotor control cover (commonly called a "doghouse cover") was not removed during pre-flight preparation. Upon takeoff, the cover became entangled in the swashplate and control linkages, rendering the helicopter uncontrollable. The TSB identified that the cover lacked prominent "remove before flight" streamers or physical barriers that would have been visible to the pilot from the cockpit or during boarding. As a result of the accident, safety actions were taken to modify these covers with long, brightly colored straps designed to be placed inside the cabin doors, providing a conspicuous visual cue to the crew before flight.

== See also ==
- Index of aviation articles
- Red tag
- Mind the gap
- Lists of aviation topics
- List of aviation, avionics, aerospace and aeronautical abbreviations
