= Loding Tamakhani =

Former Village Development Committee in Nepal

Loding Tamakhani तामाखानी
- Village development committee
- Location in Nepal
- Coordinates: 27.54°N 86.52°E
- Country: Nepal
- Zone: Sagarmatha Zone
- District: Solukhumbu District

Population (1991)
  - Total: 1,157
- Time zone: UTC+5:45 (Nepal Time)

Loding Tamakhani is a village development committee in Solukhumbu District in the Sagarmatha Zone of north-eastern Nepal. At the time of the 1991 Nepal census it had a population of 1157. Siddhartha Sherpa's ancestral home.
