= Red Tag (artificial fly) =

Artificial fly fishing pattern

- Artificial fly
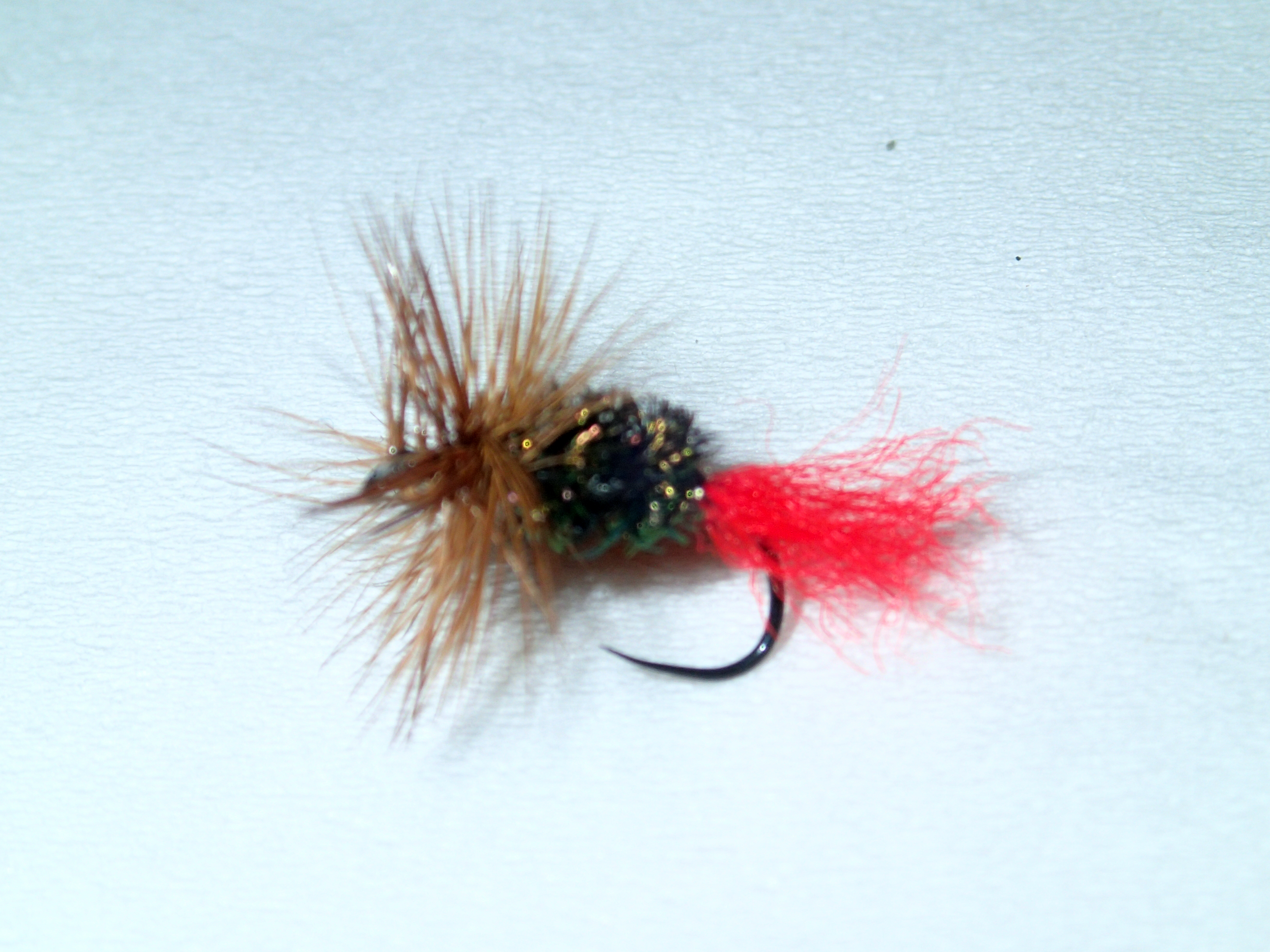
- Red Tag (dry)
- Type: Dry fly, wet fly

History
- Creator: Martyn Flynn
- Created: 1850s
- Other names: Worcestershire Gem
- Body: Peacock herl
- Hackle: Brown cock hackle
- Tag: Red wool yarn

Uses
- Primary use: Trout
- Other uses: Grayling

The Red Tag is an artificial fly originally designed as a dry fly for grayling and trout in the north country of England. The fly pattern, when introduced into Australia, particularly Tasmania, became extremely successful and popular for brown trout and remains today as one of the most essential flies for Australian fly anglers.

== Origin ==
The Red Tag was originally designed by Martyn Flynn from Worcestershire, England in the 1850s as a dry fly for grayling. Its original name was the Worcestershire Gem and was also known as the Worcestershire Wonder. red

== Materials ==
The typical Red Tag is tied with a body of peacock herl, a tail of red or crimson wool, and a red cock's hackle (actual color of hack is reddish brown). The hackle can be hen's hackle for wet fly versions. Hook sizes vary from #16 through #10.

== Variations ==
As described in Australia’s Best Trout Flies - Revisited (2016), Malcolm Crosse unless otherwise attributed

- Red Palmer
- CDC Red Tag
- Reverse Red Tag
- Red Tag Nymph
- 1-2-1 Guide Tag
- Seal's Fur Red Tag

As described in The New Illustrated Dictionary of Trout Flies (1986), John Roberts

- Badger Red Tag
- Treacle Parkin
- Green Tag
Red Tag Variations
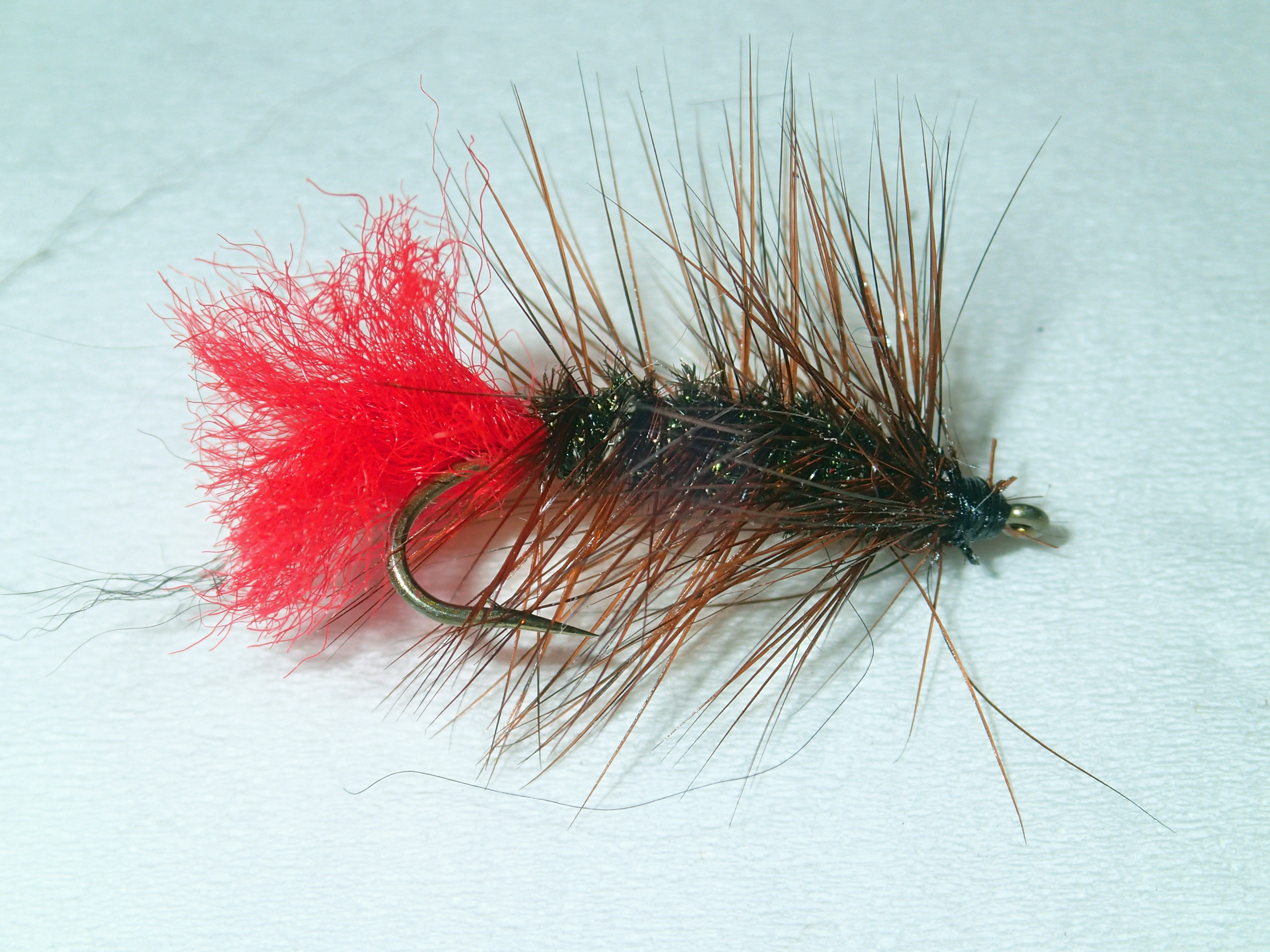
Red palmer

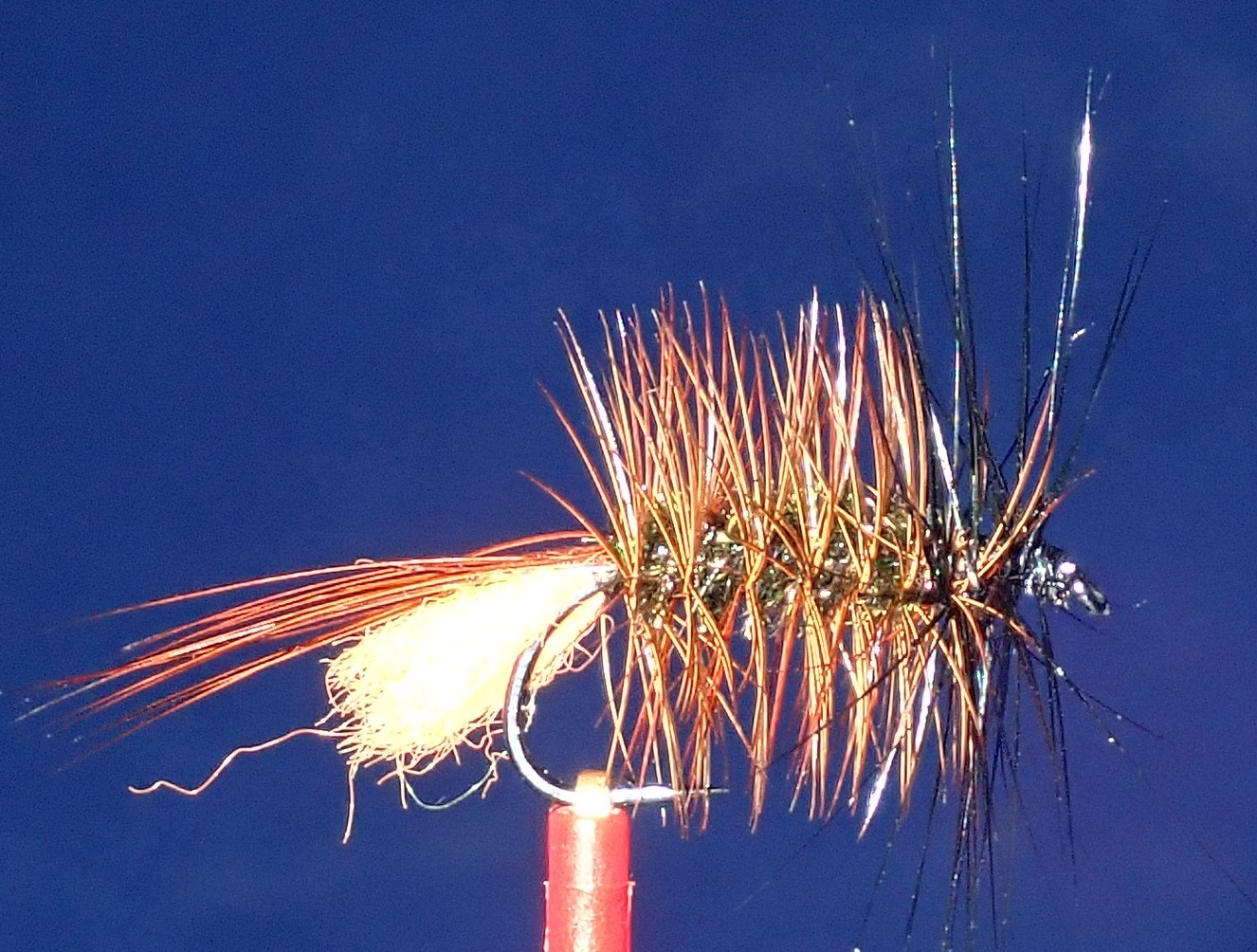
1-2-1 Guide Tag

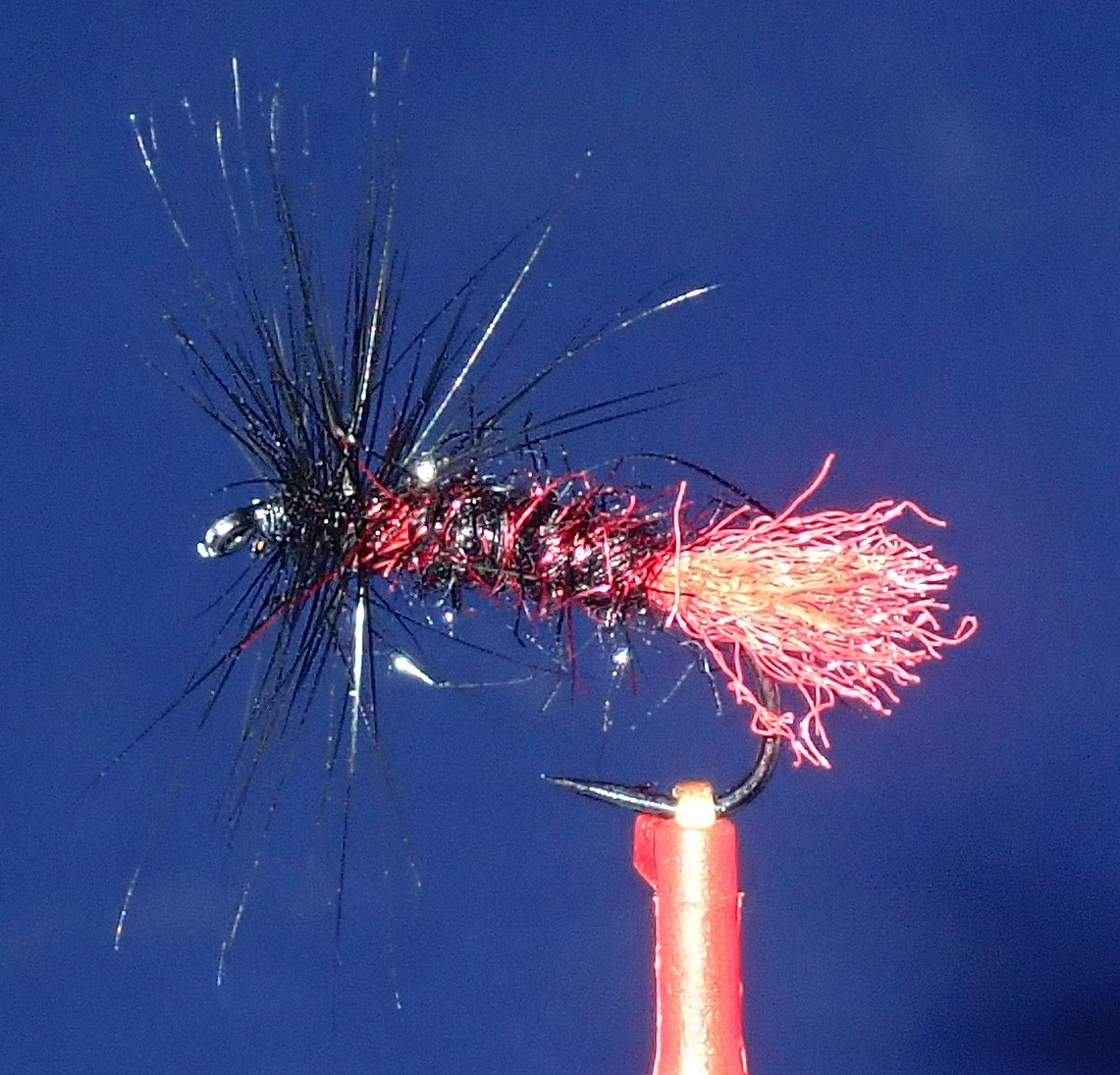
Zulu Tag

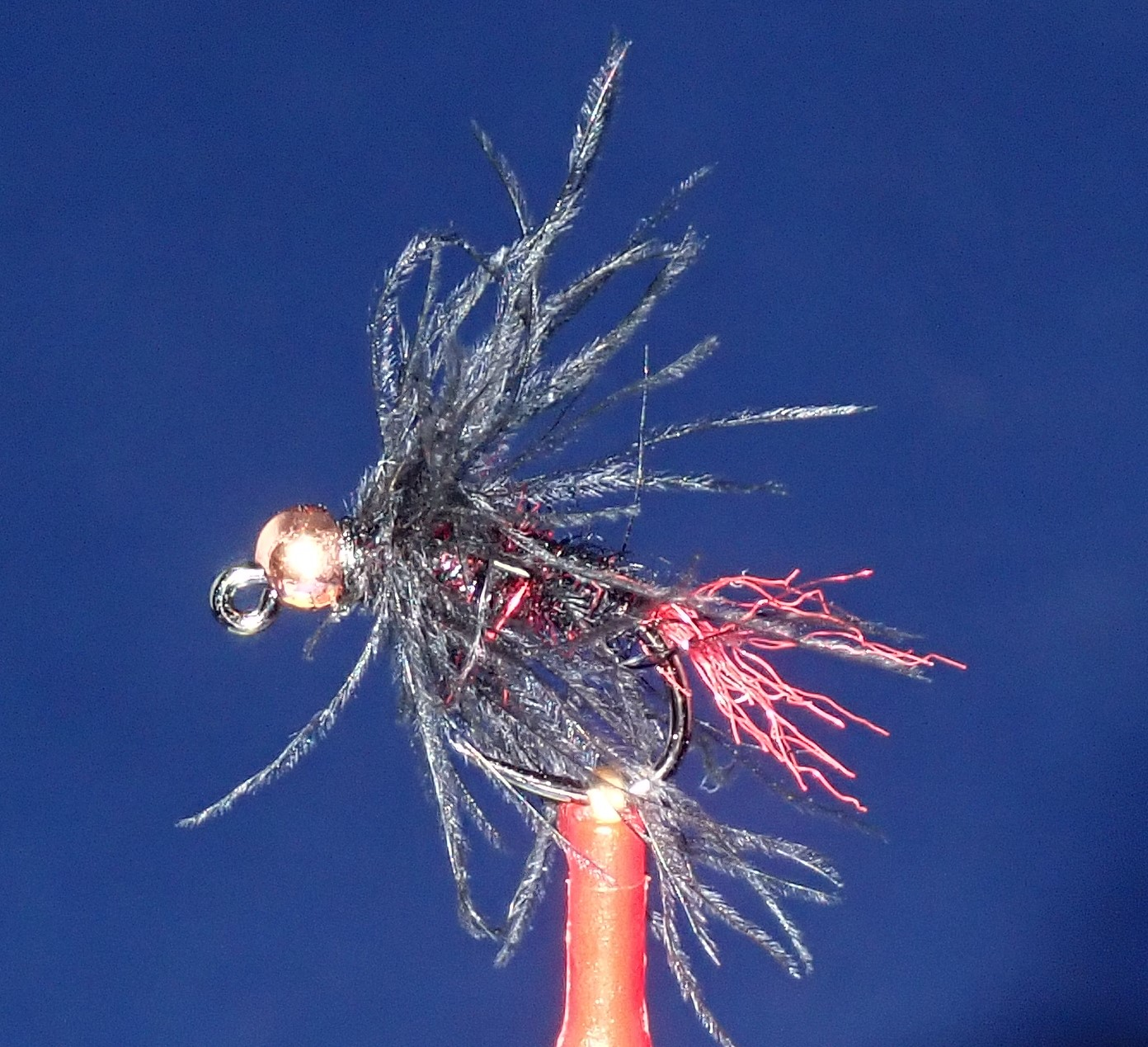
Red Tag Nymph
