= Beni, Solukhumbu =

Former Village Development Committee in Nepal

Beni, Sagarmatha बेनी chatung
- Village development committee
- Nickname: pering
- Location in Nepal
- Coordinates: 27.62°N 86.55°E
- Country: Nepal
- Zone: Sagarmatha Zone
- District: Solukhumbu District

Population (1991)
  - Total: 1,927
- Time zone: UTC+5:45 (Nepal Time)

Beni is a village development committee in Solukhumbu District in the Sagarmatha Zone of north-eastern Nepal. At the time of the 1991 Nepal census it had a population of 1927 people living in 352 individual households.
