= Phaplu Airport =

Airport in Nepal

Phaplu Airport फाप्लु विमानस्थल
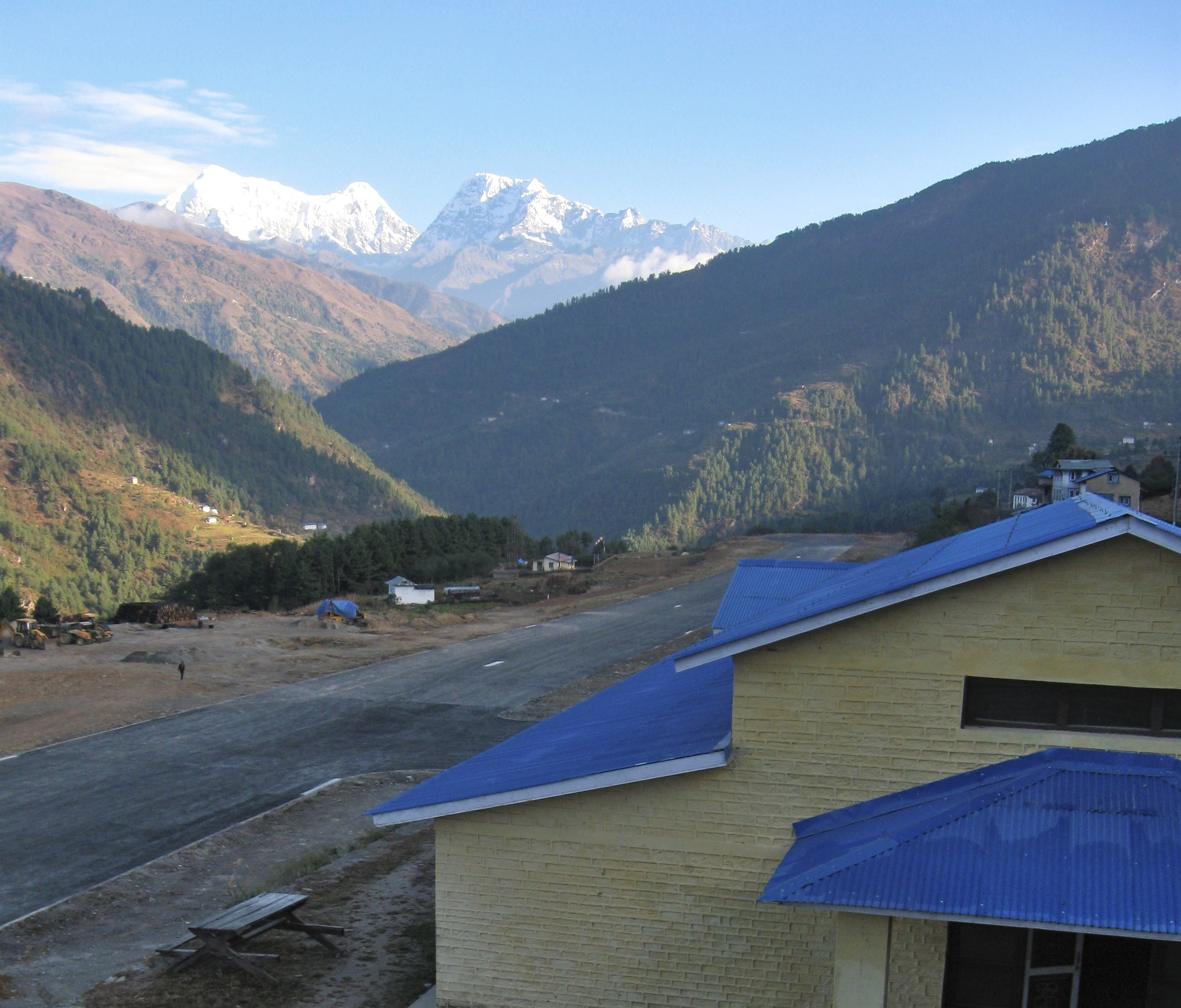
- IATA: PPL; ICAO: VNPL

Summary
- Airport type: Public
- Owner: Government of Nepal
- Operator: Civil Aviation Authority of Nepal
- Serves: Solu Dudhkunda and Solukhumbu District, Nepal
- Elevation AMSL: 7,918 ft (2,413 m)
- Coordinates: 27°31′05″N 086°35′04″E
- Website: phaplu.caanepal.gov.np

Map
- Location of airport in Nepal

Runways
Direction	Length		Surface
Direction	m	ft	Surface
02/20	680	2,231	Asphalt Concrete

Phaplu Airport (Nepali: फाप्लु विमानस्थल, IATA: PPL, ICAO: VNPL) is a domestic airport located in Phaplu, Solududhkunda serving Solukhumbu District, a district in Koshi Province in Nepal.

== History ==
The airport was opened in October 1976 and later broadened by Sir Edmund Hillary to accommodate DHC-6 Twin Otter aircraft. The Civil Aviation Authority of Nepal shut down the airport in 2013 in order to pave the runway. The airport reopened one year later with a full blacktopped runway.

== Facilities ==
The airport resides at an elevation of 7,918 feet (2,413 m) above mean sea level. It has one runway which is 671 metres (2,201 ft) in length.

As the airport lies within the approach of Lukla Airport, flights en route to Lukla often get diverted to Phaplu Airport.

Variable weather conditions in the region lead to regular flight disruptions.

== Airlines and destinations ==
Airlines	Destinations
Nepal Airlines	Kathmandu
Sita Air	Charter: Kathmandu
Summit Air	Kathmandu
Tara Air	Kathmandu; Charter: Lukla

== Gallery ==
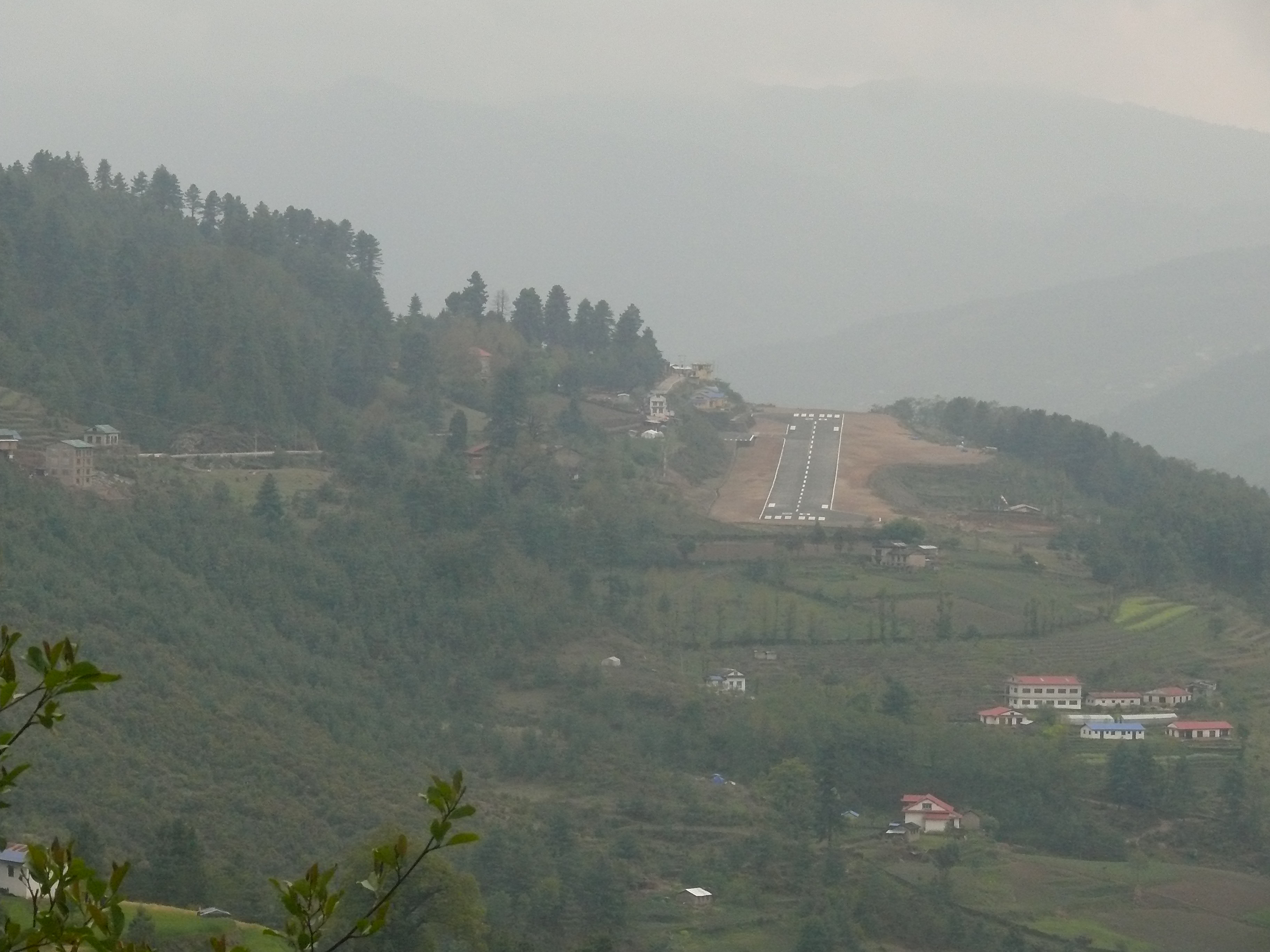
Aerial view of Phaplu Airport

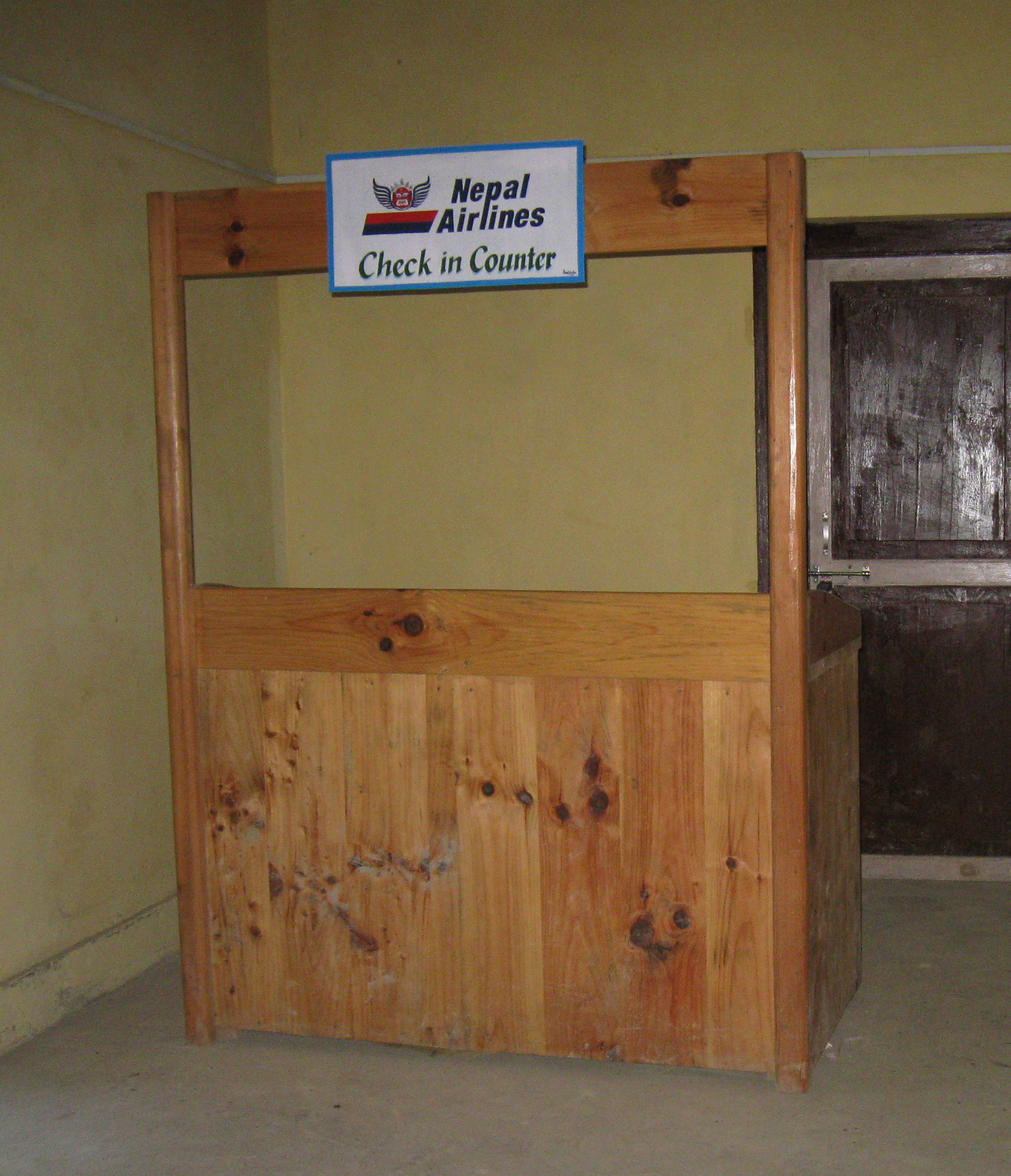
Check-in at Phaplu Airport

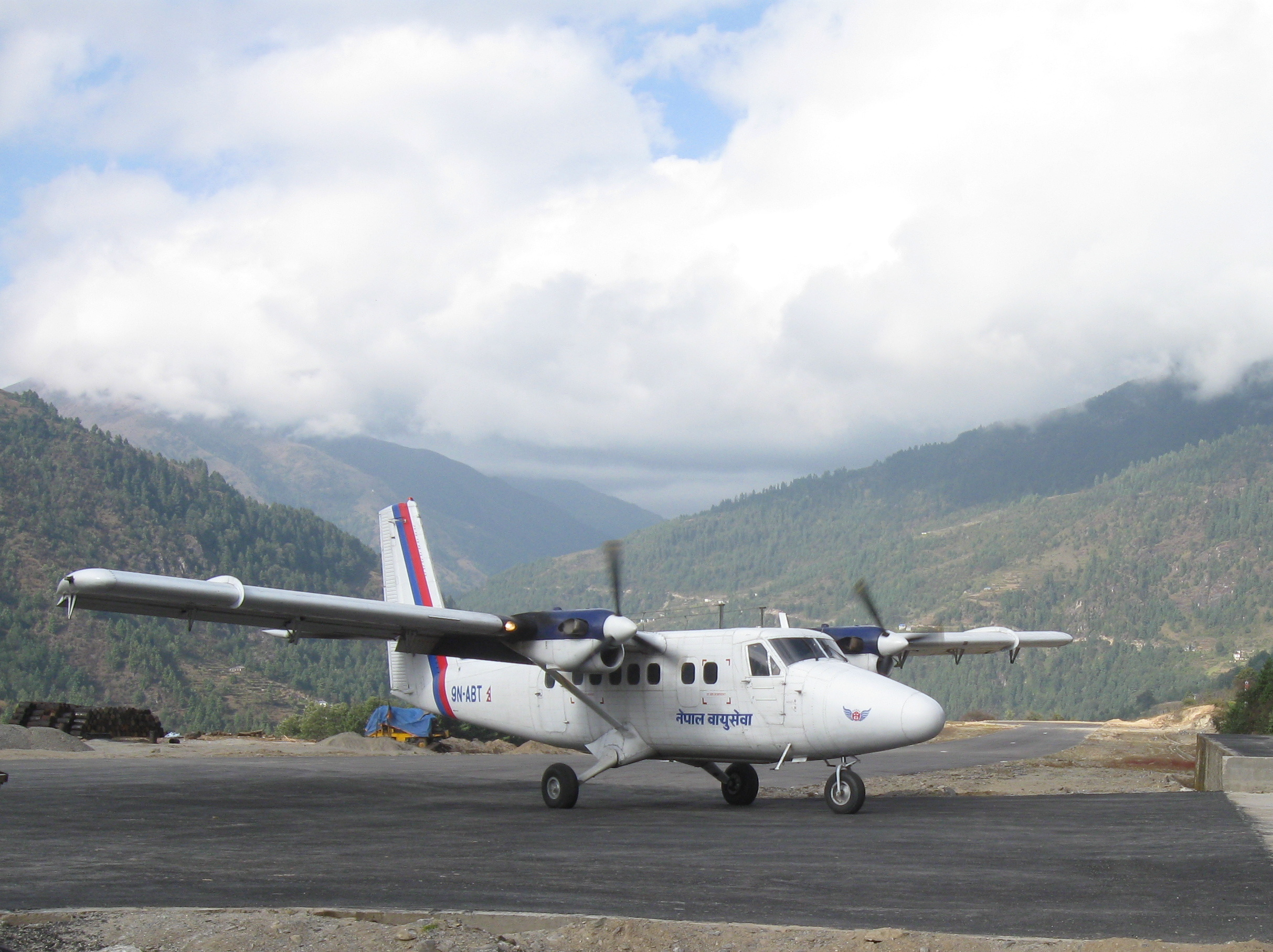
De Havilland Canada DHC-6-300 Twin Otter 9N-ABT landing at Phaplu Airport
