= Diktel Rupakot Majhuwagadhi Municipality =

Diktel Rupakot Majhuwagadhi Nagarpalika दिक्तेल रूपाकोट मझुवागढी
- Municipality
- Diktel Rupakot Majhuwagadhi Municipality
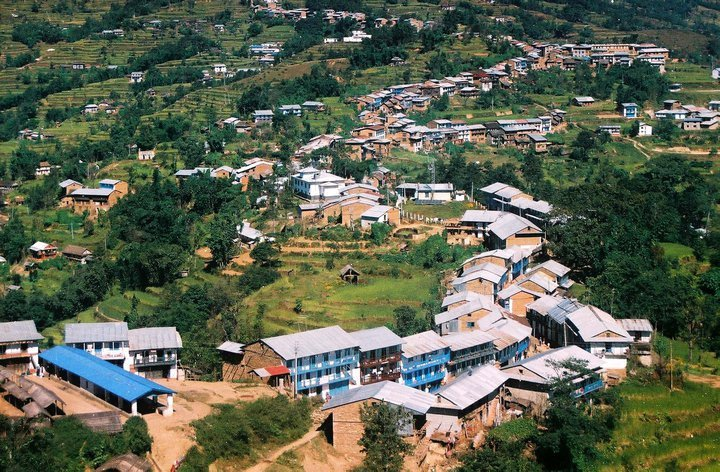
- Diktel Rupakot Majhuwagadhi Nagarpalika (Diktel Bazar, Khotang)

- Location in Province No. 1 Diktel Rupakot Majhuwagadhi Nagarpalika (Nepal)
- Coordinates: 27°12′50″N 86°47′52″E
- Country: Nepal
- Province: Province No. 1
- District: Khotang

Government
  - Mayor: Tirtharaj Bhattrai ( (NC))
  - Deputy Mayor: Bishan Rai (Maiost)

Area
  - Total: 246.51 km^{2} (95.18 sq mi)
  - Rank: 8th (Province No. 1)
- Highest elevation: 2,250 m (7,380 ft)
- Lowest elevation: 700 m (2,300 ft)

Population (2011)
  - Total: 46,903
  - Density: 190.27/km^{2} (492.79/sq mi)
- Time zone: UTC+5:45 (NST)
- Website: official website

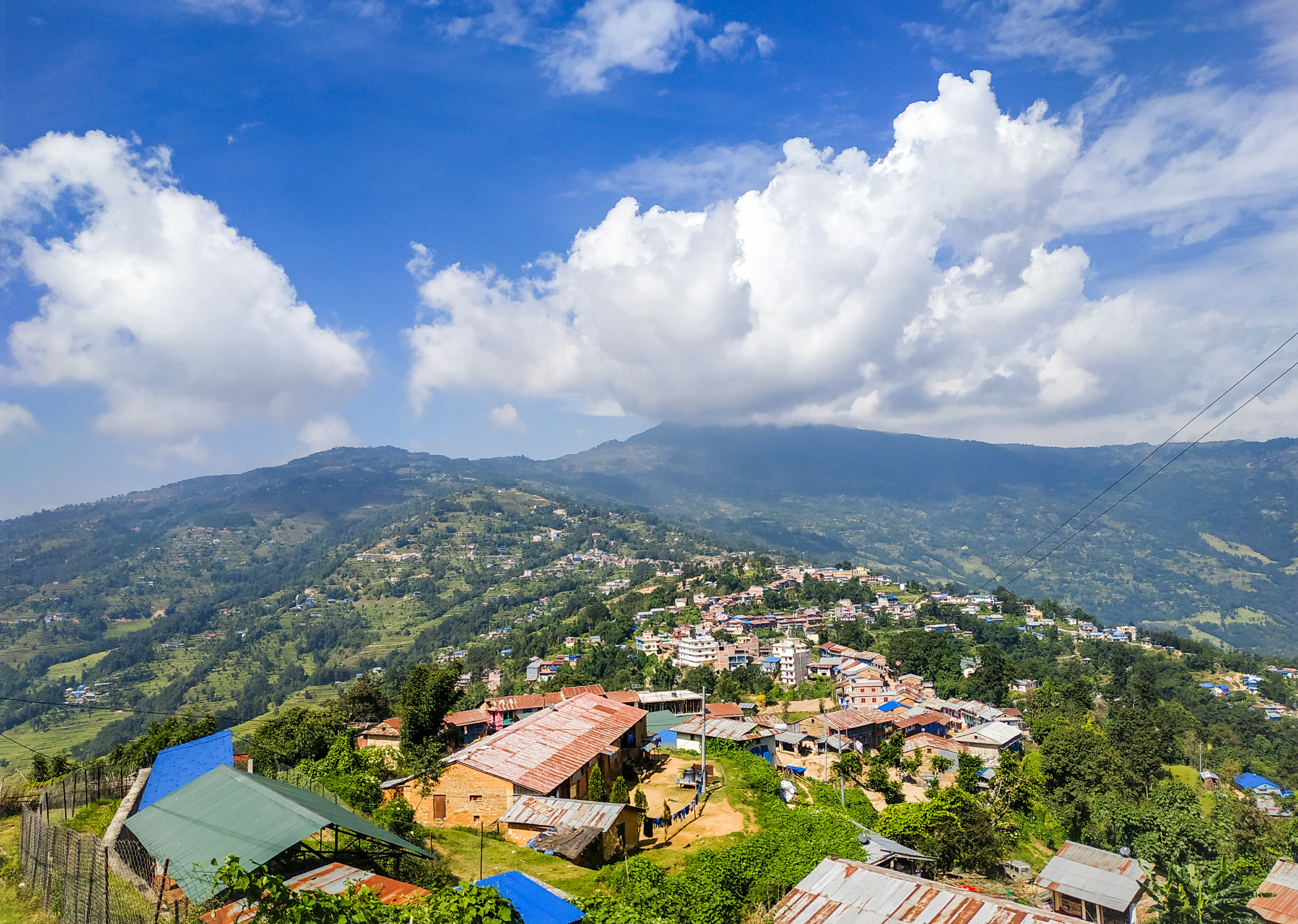
Diktel Rupakot Majhuwagadhi Nagarpalika (Diktel Bazar, Khotang)

Diktel Rupakot Majhuwagadhi is a Municipality in Khotang District of Province No. 1 of Nepal. The municipality was established in May 2014 merging some the previous Village Development Committees (VDCs) of Bamrang, Laphyang and Kahalle as Diktel Municipality.

Diktel was renamed to Rupakot Majhuwagadhi on 10 March 2017 after merging some more VDCs. The municipality is divided into 15 wards. It is on 700 m to 2250 m of elevation from sea level. The area of the municipality is 246.51 km^{2}. There are 10,050 households with population of 46,903. By 2020, the name commonly used name Diktel was re-added to the municipality's official name.

== Transportation ==
Man Maya Airport lies in Old-Diktel offering flights to Kathmandu.

== Media ==
To promote local culture, Diktel has two community radio stations: Halesi FM (102.4 MHz) and Rupakot Radio (105.0 MHz).

== Climate ==
Climate data for Diktek (Dwarpa), elevation 1,829 m (6,001 ft), (1961–1990)
Month	Jan	Feb	Mar	Apr	May	Jun	Jul	Aug	Sep	Oct	Nov	Dec	Year
Mean daily maximum °C (°F)	13.8 (56.8)	15.6 (60.1)	20.2 (68.4)	22.6 (72.7)	23.2 (73.8)	23.8 (74.8)	23.6 (74.5)	23.6 (74.5)	22.7 (72.9)	21.7 (71.1)	18.7 (65.7)	15.5 (59.9)	20.4 (68.8)
Daily mean °C (°F)	7.5 (45.5)	9.1 (48.4)	13.3 (55.9)	16.6 (61.9)	18.1 (64.6)	19.7 (67.5)	20.0 (68.0)	19.7 (67.5)	18.7 (65.7)	16.7 (62.1)	12.3 (54.1)	8.8 (47.8)	15.0 (59.1)
Mean daily minimum °C (°F)	1.3 (34.3)	2.9 (37.2)	6.4 (43.5)	10.6 (51.1)	13.1 (55.6)	15.6 (60.1)	16.3 (61.3)	15.8 (60.4)	14.8 (58.6)	11.6 (52.9)	5.9 (42.6)	2.2 (36.0)	9.7 (49.5)
Average precipitation mm (inches)	11.0 (0.43)	6.0 (0.24)	47.0 (1.85)	60.0 (2.36)	144.0 (5.67)	309.0 (12.17)	365.0 (14.37)	330.0 (12.99)	213.0 (8.39)	103.0 (4.06)	9.0 (0.35)	5.0 (0.20)	1,602 (63.08)
Source: FAO
