= Syangboche Airport =

Airport in Nepal

Syangboche Airport स्याङबोचे हवाइ-मैदान
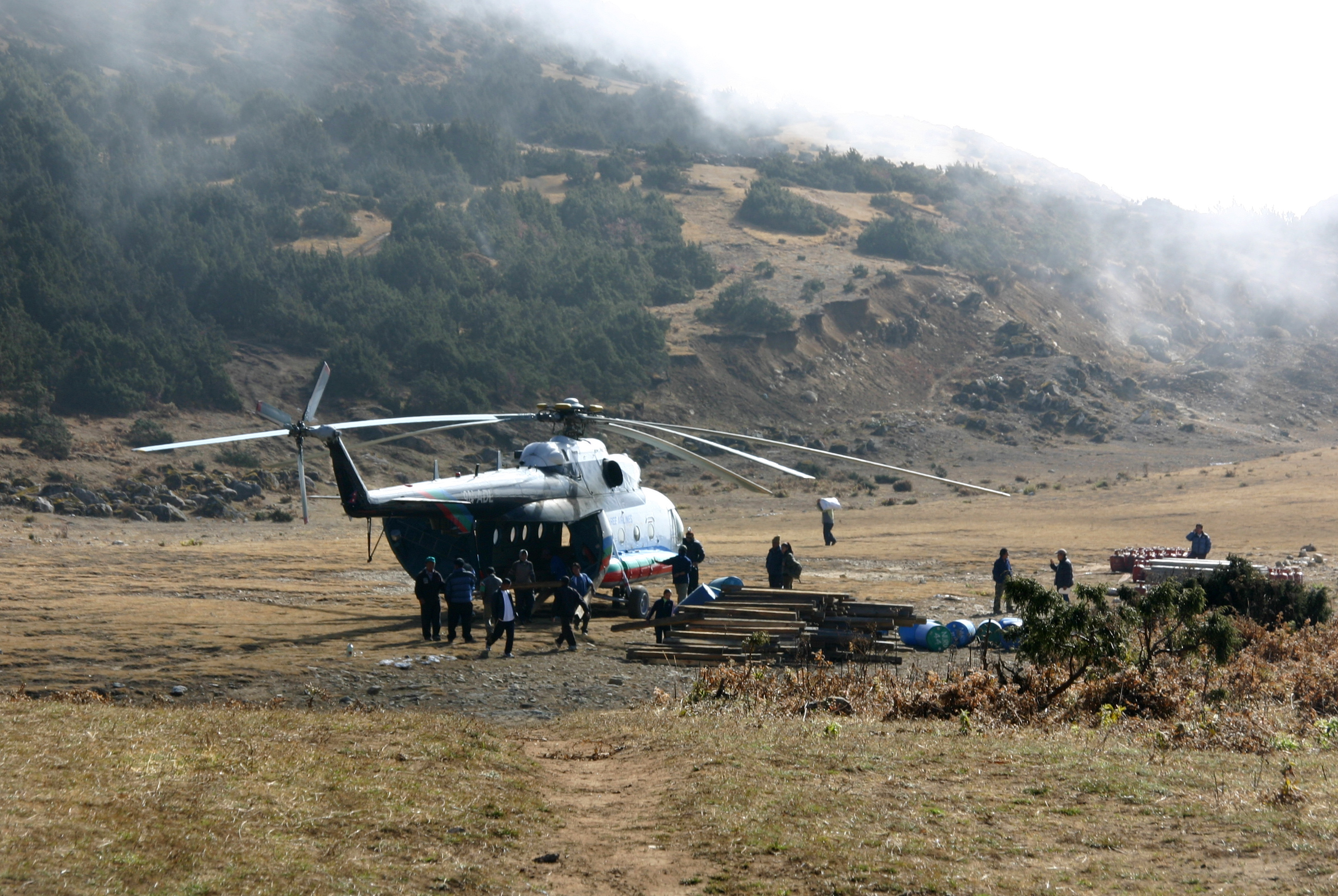
- IATA: SYH; ICAO: VNSB

Summary
- Airport type: Public
- Owner: Government of Nepal
- Operator: Civil Aviation Authority of Nepal
- Serves: Namche Bazaar, Solukhumbu, Nepal
- Elevation AMSL: 12,402 ft (3,780 m)
- Coordinates: 27°48′40.4″N 086°42′44.2″E

Map
- Location of airport in Nepal

Runways
Direction	Length		Surface
Direction	m	ft	Surface
13/31	405	1,329	unpaved

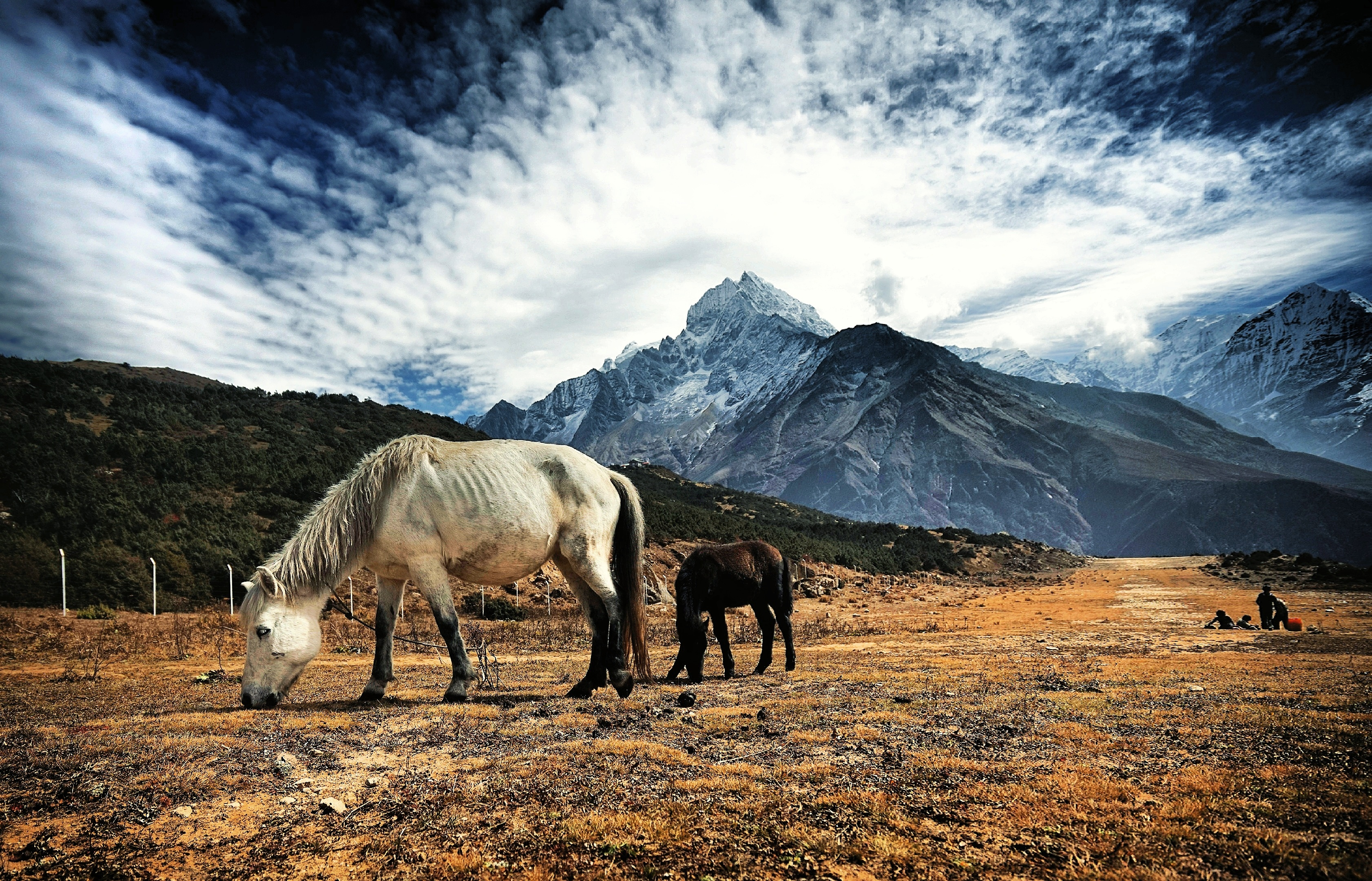
Syangboche airstrip

Syangboche Airport (Nepali: स्याङ्बोचे हवाइ-मैदान) (IATA: SYH, ICAO: VNSB) is a domestic airport located in Namche Bazaar serving Solukhumbu District, a district in Koshi Province in Nepal. Syangboche Airport’s first and foremost challenge is its elevation at 3,780 m (12,402 ft); it is exposed to some of the most extreme and capricious weather conditions in the world, with heavy winds, fog and snowfall.

== History ==
The airport was constructed in 1971 by a team led by Takashi Miyahara and was opened with a test flight by Royal Nepal Airlines on June 1, 1973. It was built to serve Hotel Everest View, at the time the hotel at the highest elevation in the world.

In the early 2000s, an expansion proposal that would let tourists skip the trek from Lukla to Namche Bazaar met opposition from Lukla entrepreneurs who feared a loss of business. However, the plans for expansion never materialized.

== Facilities ==
The airport is at an elevation of 3,748 m (12,297 ft) and has one runway with a length of 405 m (1,329 ft).

== Airlines and destinations ==
Currently, there are no scheduled services to and from Syangboche Airport. Previously Nepal Airlines and Tara Air operated routes to Kathmandu. The nearest open airport is Tenzing–Hillary Airport, located 13 km south of Namche Bazaar.
