= Aviation parts tag =

Serviceable and airworthy denoter

Tagging, especially "yellow tag", is a term used in US aviation to indicate a part is serviceable and airworthy as evaluated by an FAA certified repair station. This term is an industry term and is not an FAA requirement or mentioned in the Federal Aviation Regulations (FAR).

- Red Tag: component is scrap or unusable
- Yellow Tag: component is serviceable and airworthy
- Green Tag: component is not airworthy but is repairable

In Canada, a green tag is used for a serviceable and airworthy part, and as in the US, the presence of the tag does not guarantee that the part is legal for use in certificated aircraft.

The color coded system was developed by the U.S. Army Air Corps during World War II.

== See also ==
- Index of aviation articles
- Remove before flight
- Lists of aviation topics
- List of aviation, avionics, aerospace and aeronautical abbreviations
