= Color-tagged structure =

Triage system for damaged buildings

A color-tagged structure is a structure which has been classified by a color to represent the severity of damage or the overall condition of the building. The exact definition for each color may be different in different countries and jurisdictions.

A red-tagged structure has been severely damaged to the degree that the structure is too dangerous to inhabit. Similarly, a structure is yellow-tagged if it has been moderately damaged to the degree that its habitability is limited (only during the day, for example). A green-tagged structure may mean the building is either undamaged or has suffered slight damage, although differences exist at local levels when to use a green tag.

Tagging is performed by government building officials, or, occasionally during disasters, by engineers deputized by the building official. Natural disasters such as earthquakes, floods and mudslides are among the most common causes of a building being red-, yellow- or green-tagged. Usually, after such incidents, the local government body responsible for enforcing the building safety code examines the affected structures and tags them as appropriate.

In some areas of the United States, buildings are marked with a rectangular sign that is red with a white border and a white "X". Such signs provide the same information as "red-tagging" a building. Tagging structures in these ways can warn firefighters and others about hazardous buildings before the buildings are entered.
