= Phaphlu =

Town in Nepal

Coordinates: 27°31′N 86°35′E

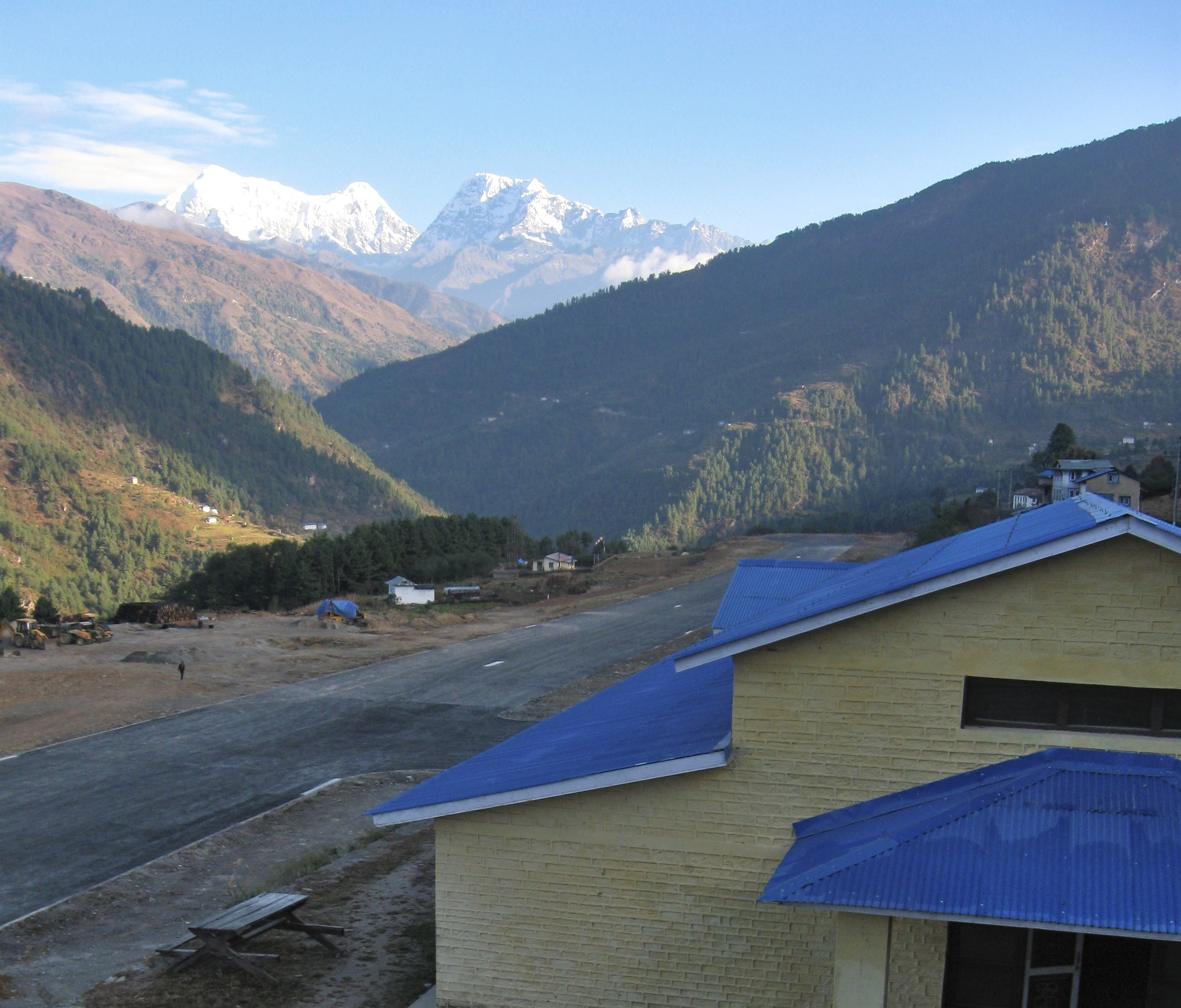
Phaplu Airport in 2014

Phaphlu or Phaplu is a mountainous town in Solukhumbu, Nepal, approximately 270 kilometres east of Kathmandu. The altitude of the village is 2,413 m.

Phaphlu is situated in the Junbesi valley near Salleri.

Phaphlu has an airstrip, the Phaplu Airport.

Edmund Hillary funded the development of the Solu hospital in Phaphlu, which was managed by the Himalayan Trust from 1974 to 1986 and thereafter managed by the Nepalese government.

The Zeke O’Connor school – founded in 2010 – provides English-language instruction and is financed by the Sir Edmund Hillary Foundation of Canada and named after its founder.
