= Everest Air =

Nepalese airline

IATA	ICAO	Call sign
E2	-	-
- Commenced operations: 1992
- Ceased operations: 1998
- AOC #: 007/96
- Operating bases: Tribhuvan International Airport
- Fleet size: 1 (at closure)
- Destinations: 11 (at closure)
- Headquarters: Kathmandu, Nepal

Everest Air was an airline based in Kathmandu, Nepal that provided scheduled domestic air services and chartered helicopter flights.

== History ==
Tha airline was originally formed as Nepal Air Charter Services. It was formed in 1992 and became defunct in 1998.

== Destinations ==
Everest Air regularly served the following destinations, which were cancelled either at the closure of operations or before:

City	Airport	Notes	Refs
Bhairahawa	Bhairahawa Airport		
Bharatpur	Bharatpur Airport		
Biratnagar	Biratnagar Airport		
Jomsom	Jomsom Airport		
Jumla	Jumla Airport		
Kathmandu	Tribhuvan International Airport	Hub	
Lamidanda	Lamidanda Airport		
Lukla	Tenzing–Hillary Airport		
Pokhara	Pokhara Airport		
Manthali	Ramechhap Airport		
Rumjatar	Rumjatar Airport		

== Fleet ==
At the time of closure, Everest Air operated the following aircraft:

Everest Air Fleet
Aircraft	In fleet	Notes
Dornier 228	1	

=== Former fleet ===
Everest Air former fleet
Aircraft	In fleet	Notes
Mil Mi-8	1	
Dornier 228	3	

== Accidents and incidents ==
- 1993 Everest Air Dornier 228 crash - On 31 July 1993, an Everest Air Dornier 228-101 aircraft, performing a scheduled flight from Kathmandu to Bharatpur, struck a mountain at Bharatpur. All 3 crew members and 16 passengers were killed.
