= Manthali, Ramechhap =

Manthali मन्थली
- Municipality
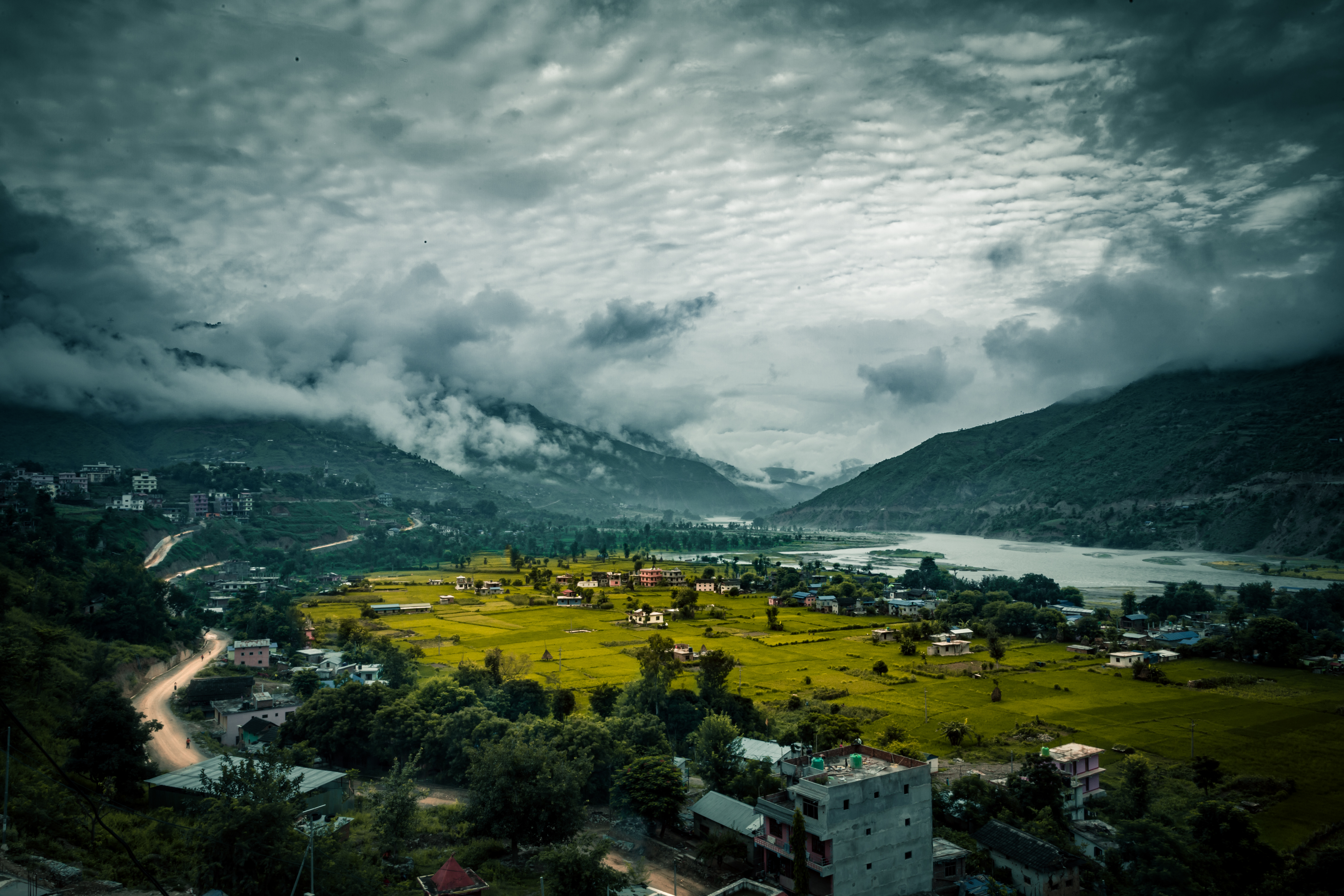
- Nickname: मुनथली
- Location in Nepal
- Coordinates: 27.38°N 86.07°E
- Country: Nepal
- Province: Bagmati
- District: Ramechhap

Government
  - Type: Mayor–council
  - Mayor: Mr. Laba Shrestha
  - Deputy Mayor: Mrs. Ishwori Basnet

Area
  - Total: 100.7 km^{2} (38.9 sq mi)

Population (2011)
  - Total: 45,416
  - Density: 451.0/km^{2} (1,168/sq mi)
- Time zone: UTC+5:45 (Nepal Standard Time)
- Website: www.manthalimun.gov.np

Manthali is a municipality and the headquarters of Ramechhap District in Bagmati Province, Nepal. It was established on 2 December 2014 by merging the former village development committees Old-Manthali, Bhatauli, Chisapani, Kathjor, Bhaluwajor, Salupati and Sunarpani. It was declared the headquarters of the district on 9 March 1989 (26 Falgun 2045 BS). It lies on the bank of the Tamakoshi River. At the time of the 2011 Nepal census, it had a population of 45,416 people, living in 10,099 individual households.

== History ==
Ramechhap Municipality was declared by the Government of Nepal on 16 Mangsir 2072 BS (December 2015). At the time of its initial formation, it comprised the former Ramechhap, Sukajor and Okhreni Village Development Committees (VDCs). The municipality was subsequently reconstituted on 22 Falgun 2073 BS (March 2017) as part of the restructuring of local administrative units in Nepal. Following the reconstitution, the municipality incorporated the former Gothgaun, Deurali, Sanghutar, Himganga and Rampur VDCs. The municipality currently consists of nine wards, with its administrative centre in Ramechhap Bazaar.

== Etymology ==
The name of the place comes from two words of the people of the Majhi (a fisher tribe of Nepal). It is a combination of two words "Mun" and "Thali". The former means a local alcoholic dish of Majhi people who are the locals of this place and the later means a place. The word Munthali means a place for eating Mun. It was later named Manthali.

== Demographics ==
At the time of the 2011 Nepal census, Manthali Municipality had a population of 45,614. Of these, 71.8% spoke Nepali, 9.7% Tamang, 7.2% Majhi, 5.3% Newar, 4.0% Magar, 0.8% Yolmo, 0.5% Maithili, 0.1% Sherpa, 0.1% Sunwar and 0.1% other languages as their first language.

In terms of ethnicity/caste, 33.8% were Chhetri, 12.9% Newar, 10.2% Tamang, 9.1% Magar, 7.6% Majhi, 6.5% Sarki, 5.8% Hill Brahmin, 3.0% Gharti/Bhujel, 2.7% Sanyasi/Dasnami, 2.6% Damai/Dholi, 2.6% Kami, 0.8% Yolmo, 0.6% Pahari 0.3% other Dalit, 0.2% Badi, 0.1% Terai Brahmin, 0.1% Hajjam/Thakur, 0.1% Hayu, 0.1% Sherpa, 0.1% Sunuwar, 0.1% Teli, 0.1% other Terai, 0.1% Tharu, 0.1% Yadav and 0.2% others.

In terms of religion, 86.2% were Hindu, 12.2% Buddhist, 0.6% Christian, 0.6% Prakriti and 0.4% others.

In terms of literacy, 64.5% could read and write, 3.4% could only read and 32.1% could neither read nor write.

== Education ==
Education facility of this municipality is well developed. In 2065 BS, Rajesh Prasai of Little Star English School secured the position of district topper in SLC. In 2011 Pramod Mahat and Divya Bhatta of Tamakoshi English Boarding School of this municipality were able to secure the position of district topper in the SLC examination. In 2012 Kusum Karki was zonal topper. In 2013 Suman Subedi was district topper. In 2014 Amrit Majhi was the district topper. Later in 2015 Arun Shrestha secured highest mark in the district from Karkaladevi English Boarding School who created the history of scoring 100 out of 100 in mathematics subject, the first one to do so in the history of Ramechhap district. The popular schools of this area are Tamakoshi English Boarding School, Little Star English School, Karkala Devi English School, Manthali Secondary School and Manthali Sahid Smirti Bahumukhi Campus.

== Healthcare ==
There is a primary health centre as the greatest governmental health institute of this municipality. There are many healthposts and sub-healthposts. Among the private ones Tamakoshi Sewa Samiti and Manthali Samudaik Hospital are the most popular ones. There are many other private clinics.

== Transportation ==
Talking about the facility of transportation here, It can be said that it is better than the facilities comparing about the roads in villages while comparing with other cities, it can be said that it is not a developed one. the roads here are black pitched which is being damaged by natural calamities like landslides. Single airport of the district lies here i.e.Ramechhap Airport lies in the municipality.

== 2015 earthquake ==
Following an earthquake in April 2015, Ramechhap District was listed in the 12th position of the most affected districts. Manthali Municipality area also has been highly damaged. Many houses of Aakase area of the Municipality were completely and partially damaged. About 5 houses collapsed in Machhendandi. Most of the houses of the village areas which are made by mud and stone are not in the condition of sustaining life.
