= Summit Air (Nepal) =

Nepalese airline

IATA	ICAO	Call sign
-	SMA (Note: Summit Air has no registered ICAO code allocated, but uses "SMA" on scheduling, ticketing and baggage (as an official ICAO code would be used).)	-
- Commenced operations: 24 February 2011; 15 years ago
- Hubs: Tribhuvan International Airport
- Secondary hubs: Nepalgunj Airport Pokhara Airport
- Fleet size: 4
- Destinations: 17
- Key people: Bikash Rana, Chairman; Manoj Karki, MD; Prajwal Jung Rana, ED; Manish Panta, OD
- Website: www.summitair.com.np

Summit Air, formerly known as Goma Air, is an airline based in Kathmandu, Nepal. The airline operates from short takeoff and landing airstrips in the Western parts of Nepal. The airline received the first of two Let 410 aircraft, financed by the Czech Republic Export Bank., in October 2014, and initially only used them on flights to Lukla and Jomsom.

== History ==
The airline was founded as Goma Air in February 2011. It began to operate using Cessna Grand Caravan 208 B aircraft. In October 2014, the airline acquired one Let 410 UVP-E20 aircraft, which was the first aircraft of this type to be operated in Nepal. The airline is the only one to use Nepalgunj Airport as the main hub of operation and focuses on operating out of that base. On 13 March 2017, the airline officially changed its name to Summit Air.

In 2014, Summit Air signed a deal with Fishtail Air with the aim of enhancing Nepal's tourism. Both Airlines are led by Bikash JB Rana, for which a collaboration was eased. Following Goma Air's name change to Summit Air, in 2018, Fishtail Air also changed its name to Summit Helicopters to visualize the cooperation, however has since reverted its name.

== Destinations ==
Summit Air serves the following destinations as of January 2020:

Destination	Airport	Notes
Kathmandu	Tribhuvan International Airport	Hub
Nepalgunj	Nepalgunj Airport	
Dhangadhi	Dhangadhi Airport	
Surkhet	Surkhet Airport	
Simikot	Simikot Airport	
Jumla	Jumla Airport	
Pokhara	Pokhara Airport	
Jomsom	Jomsom Airport	
Dolpa	Dolpa Airport	
Lukla	Tenzing-Hillary Airport	
Manthali	Ramechhap Airport	
Phaplu	Phaplu Airport	
Rara	Talcha Airport	
Sanphebagar	Sanphebagar Airport	Terminated
Bajhang	Bajhang Airport	
Rukum	Rukum Salle Airport	
Bajura	Bajura Airport	

== Fleet ==
Summit Air fleet
Aircraft	In Fleet	On Orders	Passengers			Notes
Aircraft	In Fleet	On Orders	C	Y	Total	Notes
Let 410 UVP-E20	4	—	0	18	18	Three originally delivered.
Total	4	0				

== Accidents and incidents ==
- 2 June 2015 - A Goma Air flight from Jomsom landed in Pokhara without the nose gear. All 18 passengers on board the Let 410 aircraft were safe, but the aircraft 9N-AKY suffered damage in the nose wheel part.
- 12 January 2017 - A Let 410 Turbolet, registration 9N-AKZ, of Goma Air outbound from Nepalgunj to Mugu experienced a tyre burst incident during landing at Talcha Airport. All the 15 passengers reported to be safe.
- 27 May 2017 - Summit Air Flight 409 crashed on final approach to Lukla Airport. The aircraft, a Let 410, Registration 9N-AKY, crashed into the rock-wall 5–10 m (16–33 ft) below the runway. From the 3 person crew the Flight Senior Captain Paras Kumar Rai was killed in the crash, Co-Pilot Shrizan Manandhar died undergoing treatment at the scene, the Air Hostesses Pragya Maharjan was injured and airlifted to Kathmandu for further treatment.
- 14 April 2019 - A Let 410 Turbolet, registration 9N-AMH, crashed at Lukla Airport. The aircraft was taking off from runway 24 when shortly after starting its run the nose is seen to dip and the plane deviate slightly to the left before the nose lifts again and the plane veers off the runway to the right onto the helicopter apron impacting two helicopters of Manang Air and Shree Air. The first officer of the flight died in the accident as well as two security officers on the ground near the runway. Several people were injured.
- 20 March 2020 – A Summit Air Let 410 en route from Lukla to Kathmandu made an emergency landing at Ramechhap Airport due to an engine failure. All of the crew and passengers evacuated the aircraft safely.
- 17 April 2022 - Summit Air SMA 407 en route from Kathmandu to Lukla made an emergency landing at Tribhuvan international airport due to engine failure. 15 passengers and 3 crew members on board are safe.
