= Yashodhara Air =

Nepalese airline

IATA	ICAO	Call sign
—	—	—
- Founded: 2020
- Hubs: Ramechhap Airport, Pokhara Airport
- Parent company: Buddha Air

Yashodhara Air is an upcoming Nepalese airline set up by Buddha Air aimed at serving STOL-services to remote airfields in Nepal from two bases, Ramechhap Airport and Pokhara Airport.

== History ==
In 2020, Buddha Air announced first plans to enter the rural aviation market in Nepal by serving smaller STOL-airfields by Fall 2021. Consequently, Yashodhara Air was set up in January 2021 with the aim of operating by 2022. In November 2021, during Dubai Airshow 2021 the airline announced plans to launch in early 2023.

The airline's name derives from Yashodhara, the wife of Gautama Buddha after which the parent company Buddha Air is named.

== Destinations ==
The airline is supposed to operate to remote airfields from two bases at Ramechhap Airport and Pokhara Airport.

== Fleet ==
The airline is mulling over using different aircraft types including Viking Air DHC-6 Twin Otter, Let L-410 and Cessna 408. In November 2021, during Dubai Airshow 2021 the airline decided to purchase four Viking Air Twin Otters.
