= Gorkha Airlines =

Nepali airline

IATA	ICAO	Call sign
G1	IKA	GORKHA AIRLINES
- Founded: 1996
- Hubs: Tribhuvan International Airport
- Secondary hubs: Pokhara Airport
- Fleet size: 2
- Destinations: 10
- Headquarters: Kathmandu
- Website: http://www.gorkhaairlines.com

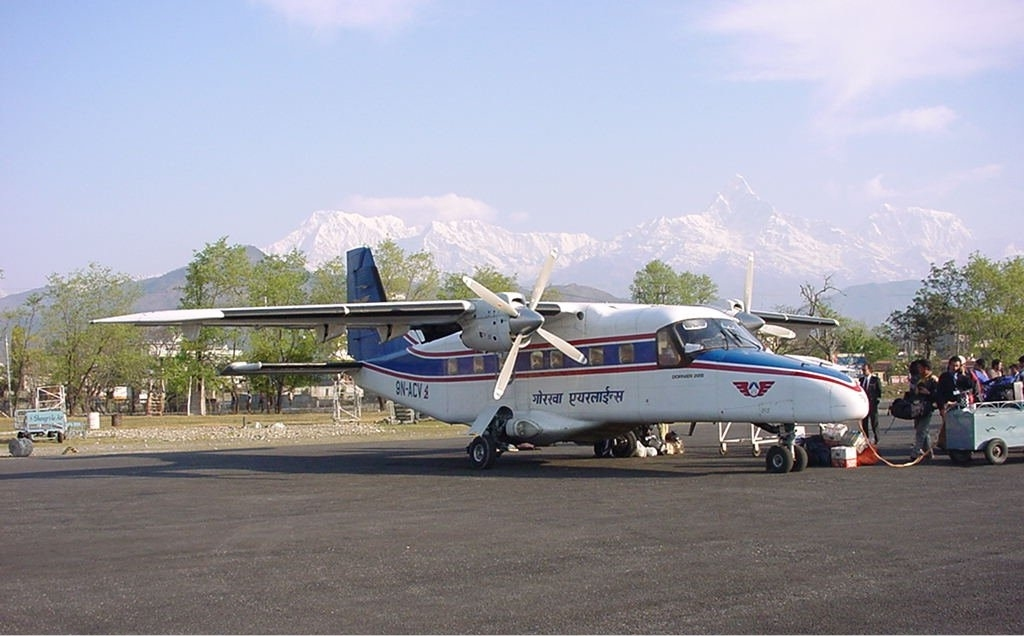
Gorkha Airlines Dornier 228, Pokhara, 2000

Gorkha Airlines Pvt. Ltd. was an airline based in Kathmandu, Nepal. It operated scheduled and charter flights to domestic destinations, as well as daily mountain flights in the Himalayas. Its main base was Tribhuvan International Airport in Kathmandu. The company slogan was Fly With Us The Gallant Way.

== History ==
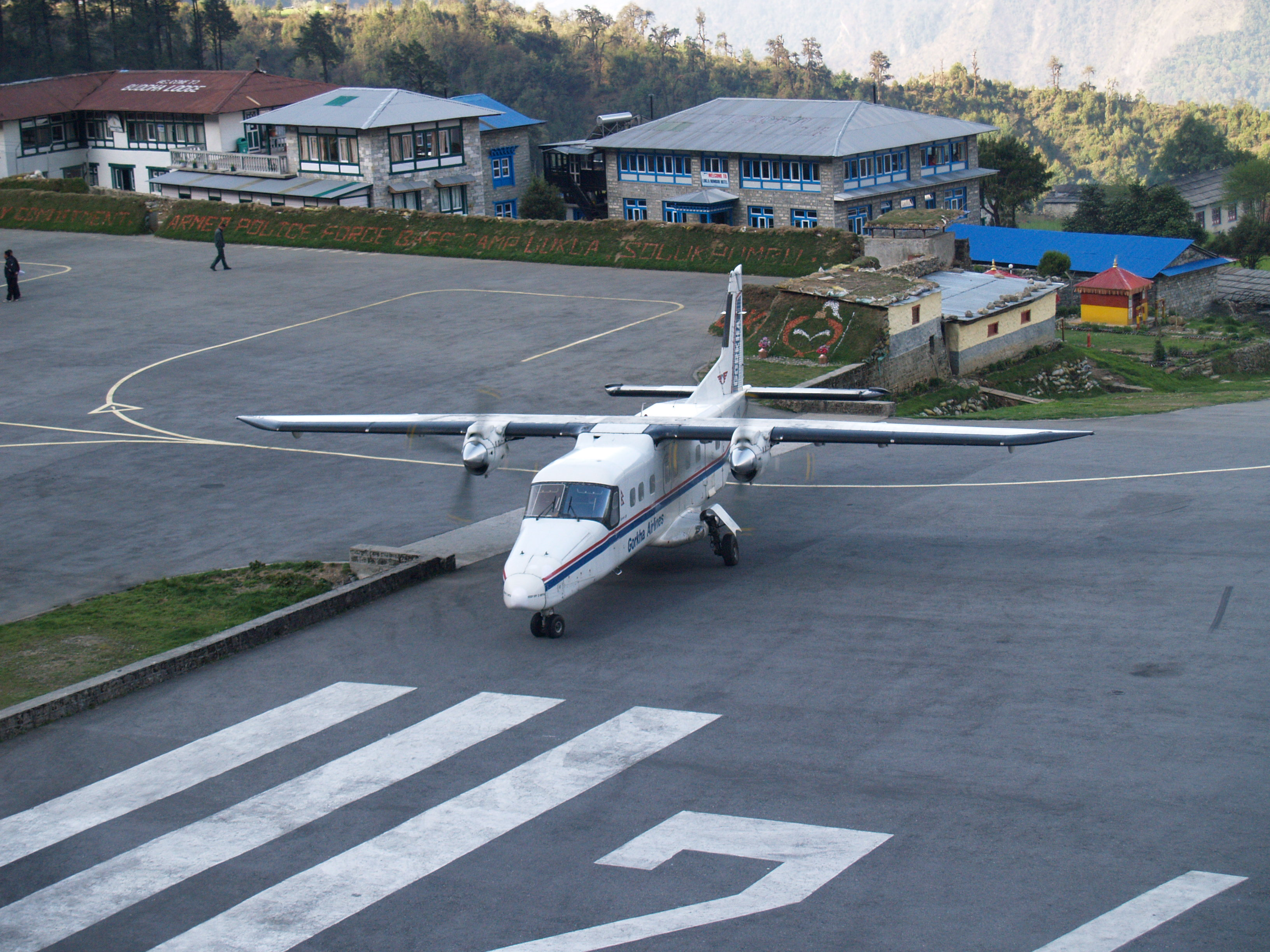
Gorkha Airlines Dornier 228 at Lukla Airport

The airline was established in 1996 and started operations on 8 July 1996. It began operations with two Mil Mi-17 helicopters and moved on to scheduled flights using fixed-wing aircraft. In 1998, the airline took over two Dornier 228s, which the airline used exclusively after discontinuing helicopter operations in 2005. The airline ceased to operate in 2008.

In 2017, Gorkha Airlines received the approval from Civil Aviation Ministry to reoperate the Airline. It planned to operate two ERJ twin-engine regional jets produced by Embraer, and two Dornier aircraft on domestic routes. However, by 2020, this did not happen.

== Destinations ==
Gorkha Airlines regularly served the following destinations, which were cancelled either at the closure of operations or before:

City	Airport	Notes	Refs
Bhairahawa	Gautam Buddha Airport		
Bharatpur	Bharatpur Airport		
Biratnagar	Biratnagar Airport		
Janakpur	Janakpur Airport		
Jomsom	Jomsom Airport		
Kathmandu	Tribhuvan International Airport	Hub	
Lukla	Tenzing–Hillary Airport		
Pokhara	Pokhara Airport		
Tumlingtar	Tumlingtar Airport		
Pipara Simara	Simara Airport		

Gorkha Airlines also operated scheduled mountain sightseeing flights from Kathmandu to Mount Everest range. The flights usually departed in the early morning hours and return to the airport one hour later.

== Fleet ==
At the time of closure, Gorkha Airlines operated the following aircraft:

Gorkha Airlines Fleet
Aircraft	In fleet	Notes
Dornier 228-212	2	

=== Former fleet ===
Gorkha Airlines Historical Fleet
Aircraft	In service	Exit from service	Notes
Mil Mi-17	1996	2005	

== Accidents and incidents ==
- On 30 June 2005, a Dornier 228 (9N-ACV) aircraft carrying nine passengers and three crew members en route from Kathmandu skidded off the runway while attempting to land at Lukla Airport. The passengers suffered only minor injuries, however, after the accident, the aircraft was withdrawn from service and written off.
