= Manang Air =

Nepalese helicopter operator

IATA	ICAO	Call sign
–	–	–
- Founded: 1997; 29 years ago
- AOC #: 082/2014
- Hubs: Tribhuvan International Airport
- Fleet size: 2
- Headquarters: Baneshwor, Kathmandu, Nepal
- Key people: Satis Prasad Pradhan (Executive Chairman)
- Website: www.manangair.com.np

Basecamp Helicopter Pvt. Ltd, formally trading as Manang Air Pvt. Ltd, is a helicopter airline based in Kathmandu, Nepal and was founded in 1997 and has been operating helicopters in commercial air transportation within the Nepalese territory under the Regulation of Civil Aviation Authority of Nepal. The company provides chartered services and is focused on personalized services such as adventure flights helicopter excursions or expedition work. It is the only Approved Training Organization in Nepal. It is currently banned from flying in the EU.

== History ==
The airline started operations with a single Mil Mi-17 helicopter in 1997. It resumed flights in 2014 following three years of no service after its lone helicopter was involved in an accident.

== Fleet ==
=== Current fleet ===
The Manang Air fleet consists of the following aircraft (as of October 2022):

Manang Air fleet
Aircraft	In fleet	Order	Passengers			Notes
Aircraft	In fleet	Order	C	Y	Total	
Eurocopter AS350 B3e	2		0	5	5	

== Accidents and incidents ==
- 15 November 2009 – A Manang Air MI-17 helicopter crashed on a cargo mission. The chopper had left Surkhet Airport at 10:30 a.m. with supplies including pipes meant for setting up a drinking water supply system in Rodikot in Humla District. The accident occurred at 11:15 a.m. A Russian flight engineer was killed in the accident, and five other people were injured.
- 10 June 2017 – A Manang Air helicopter en route to Gosainkunda from Kathmandu crash-landed at Gosainkunda Helipad incurring minor damages. There were no human casualties.
- 14 August 2018 – A Manang Air Eurocopter AS350's tail rotor hit and killed an Indian passenger upon disembarking in Hilsa, Nepal. Following this, the Civil Aviation Authority of Nepal temporarily suspended the airline's operations.
- 14 April 2019 – A Manang Air Eurocopter AS350 registration 9N-ALC parked at the helipad of Lukla Airport was destroyed when a Let 410 registration 9N-AMH operated by Summit Air veered of the runway while taking off for Ramechhap. Two helicopters of Manang Air were hit by the plane. The first officer of the flight died in the accident as well as two security officers on the ground near the runway. Several people were injured.
- 11 July 2023 – A Manang Air Eurocopter AS350 registration 9N-AMV crashed near Likhupike, Solukhumbu District en route from Tenzing-Hillary Airport to Tribhuvan International Airport in Kathmandu, just ten minutes after takeoff. All the five passengers (all Mexican nationals) and the pilot were killed in the accident.
- 14 October 2023 – A Manang Air Eurocopter AS350 registration 9N-ANJ flying from Lukla to Solukhumbu to pick up a passenger crashed near Lobuche. Captain Prakash Kumar Sedhai was injured from the fire that blew after that landing. The plant had left Lukla airport at 7:13 am and met with an accident at 7:25 am.
