= Yeti Airlines Flight 101 =

2008 aviation accident

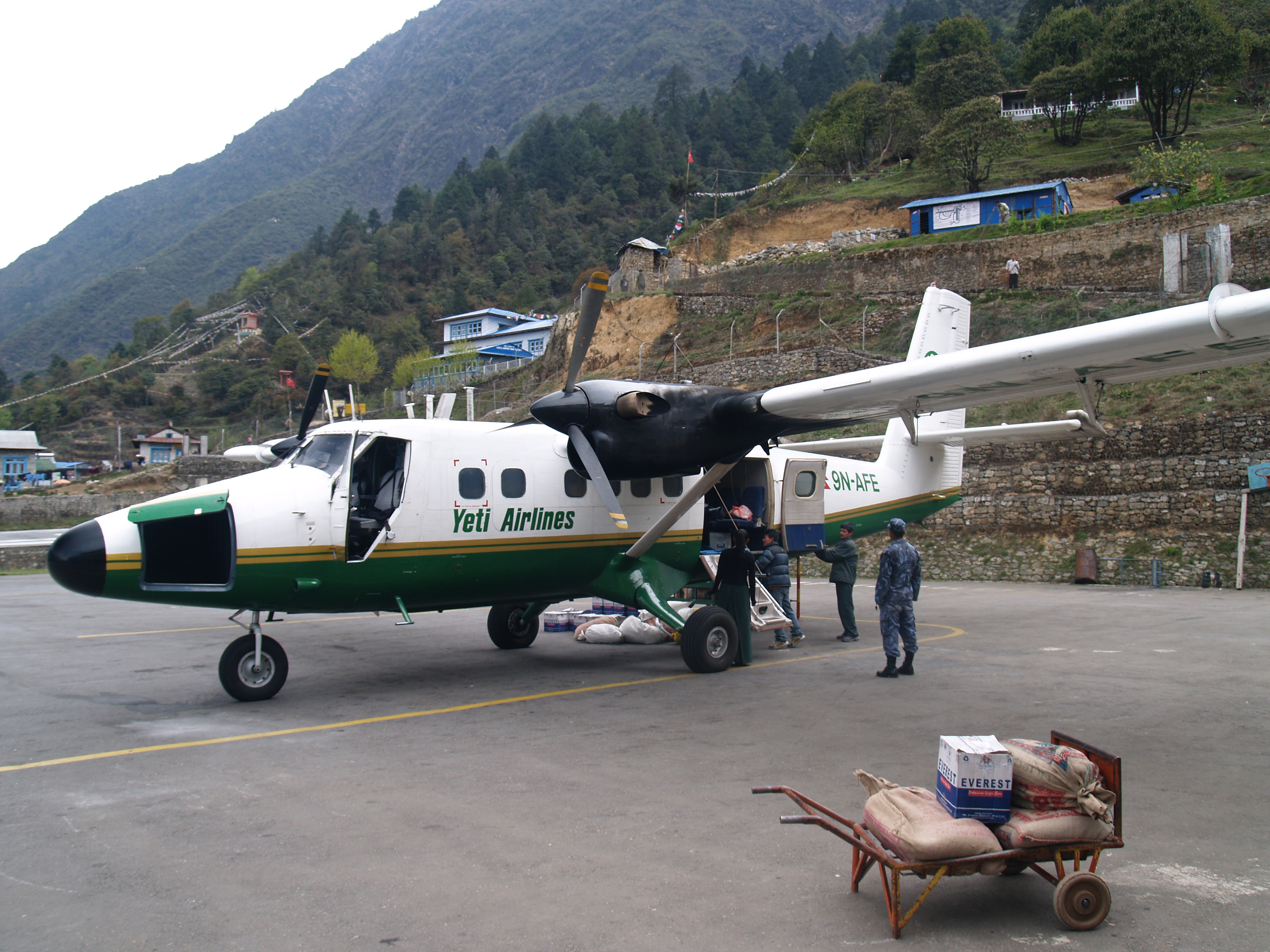
- 9N-AFE, seen at Lukla International airport in 2007

Accident
- Date: 8 October 2008
- Summary: Controlled flight into mountainous terrain due to pilot error and inclement weather
- Site: Lukla Airport, Nepal; 27°41′13″N 086°43′47″E

Aircraft
- Aircraft type: De Havilland Canada DHC-6 Twin Otter
- Operator: Yeti Airlines
- Registration: 9N-AFE
- Flight origin: Kathmandu Airport, Nepal
- Destination: Lukla Airport, Nepal
- Occupants: 19
- Passengers: 16
- Crew: 3
- Fatalities: 18
- Injuries: 1
- Survivors: 1

Yeti Airlines Flight 101 was a domestic flight in Nepal that crashed on final approach to Tenzing-Hillary Airport in the town of Lukla in eastern Nepal on 8 October 2008. The De Havilland Canada DHC-6 Twin Otter Series 200 registered as 9N-AFE originated from Tribhuvan International Airport in Kathmandu.

== Aircraft ==
The aircraft involved in the crash was a de Havilland Canada DHC-6 Twin Otter operated by Yeti Airlines. Its maiden flight was in 1980 with Bristow Helicopters. The aircraft entered into service in Nepal in 1997, when Lumbini Airways acquired the plane. In 1998, Yeti Airlines bought the plane. In 2006, it already met with a minor incident, when the aircraft collided with a fence upon landing in Bajura Airport. It was involved in another incident, when the aircraft veered off the runway at Surkhet Airport in 2007.

== Crew and passengers ==
Fourteen of the dead were reported to be tourists. Twelve of the passengers on the flight were German and two Australian. The only survivor was Surendra Kunwar, the captain of the aircraft, who was dragged free from the wreckage shortly after the crash and was flown to Kathmandu for emergency treatment.

Nationality	Fatalities		Survivors		Total
Nationality	Passengers	Crew	Passengers	Crew	Total
Nepal	2	2	0	1	5
Germany	12	–	0	–	12
Australia	2	–	0	–	2

== Accident ==
The airport is the main access to the Mount Everest region in Nepal, and is a notoriously difficult landing, with only 1,500 feet (460 m) of steeply sloped runway just 65 feet (20 m) wide and a steep approach path.

Due to bad weather conditions and heavy fog, the pilot lost visual contact, nevertheless attempted a visual approach, as there are no Instrument landing systems installed at Lukla. The aircraft came in too low and too far left, which caused the aircraft to crash short of the runway, as the landing gear got caught in a perimeter fence on airport grounds.

At the time, the crash was Yeti Airlines’ deadliest accident in its history, which it held the title for until January 2023, when it was stripped of when 9N-ANC, one of the airlines’ ATR 72s operating under Flight 691, crashed near Pokhara Airport killing 72.

== Investigation ==
A commission was formed to investigate the accident, the final report being published two months later. However, the report only came to wider attention when The Aviation Herald retrieved a copy of it in 2017. The report blamed the crash on the flight crew's misinterpretation of how fast the weather would deteriorate and their expectation of a cloud patch on final approach, which had been reported by previous flights landing in Lukla. Contributing factors included the Civil Aviation Authority of Nepal and Yeti Airlines both having a poor oversight of pilots deviating from standard operation procedures, the failure of the Automatic Flight Information Service personnel to close the airport as a result of a high work load and stress, and Yeti Airlines going as far as to prioritize economics over safety, leading to improper crew training.

== Aftermath ==
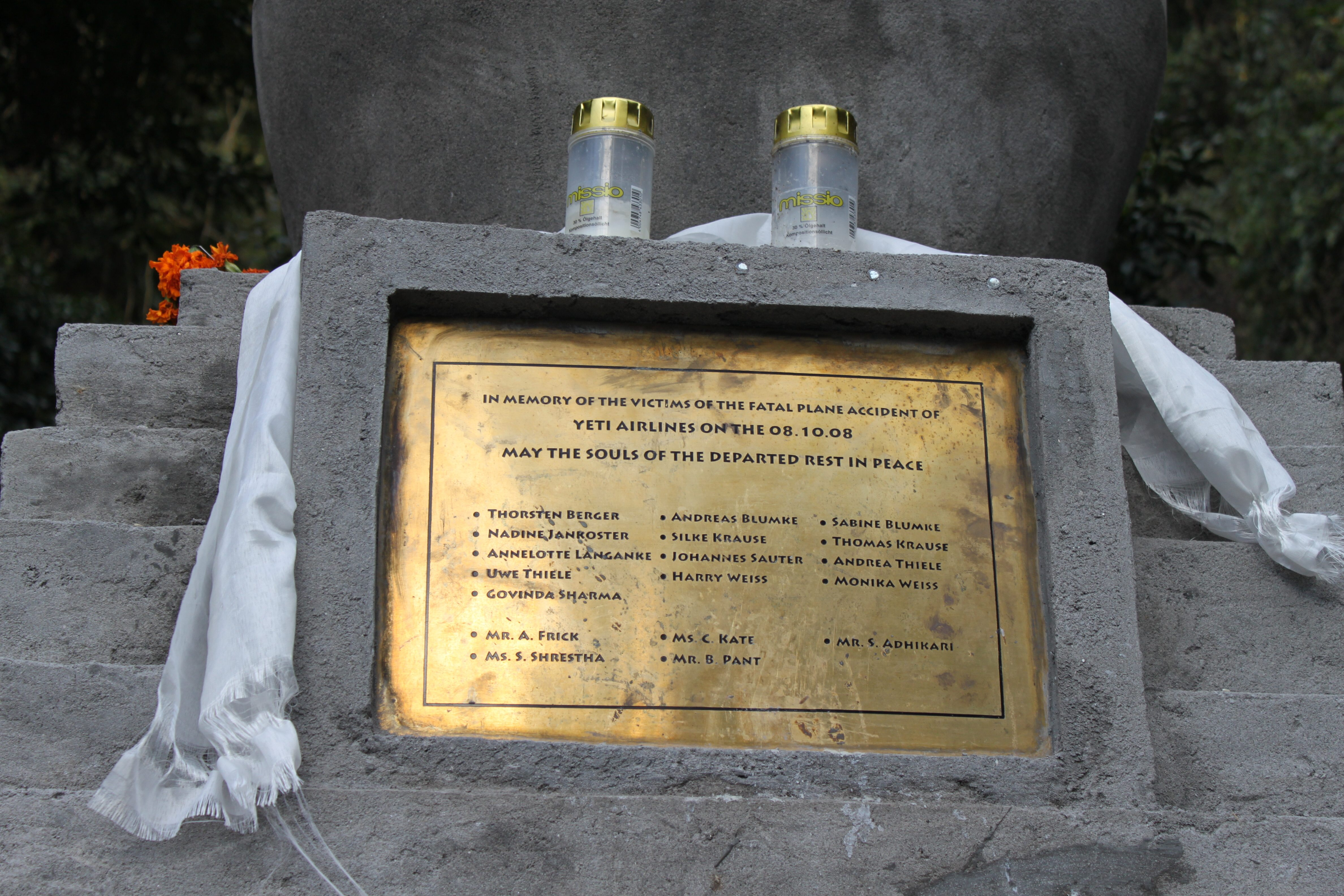
Yeti Airlines Flight 101 Memorial

The safety regulations at Lukla airport were enhanced and landings in bad weather restricted. A plaque was put up near the crash site and the local people commemorate the victims' memory every year on 8 October.
