= Flight 409 =

Flight 409 may refer to:

- United Airlines Flight 409, crashed on 6 October 1955
- Ethiopian Airlines Flight 409, crashed on 25 January 2010
- Summit Air Flight 409, crashed on 27 May 2017
