= List of Dornier 228 operators =

In July 2017, 63 Dornier 228 were in airline service. Other operators include law enforcement, paramilitary operators and military operators.

== Civilian operators ==
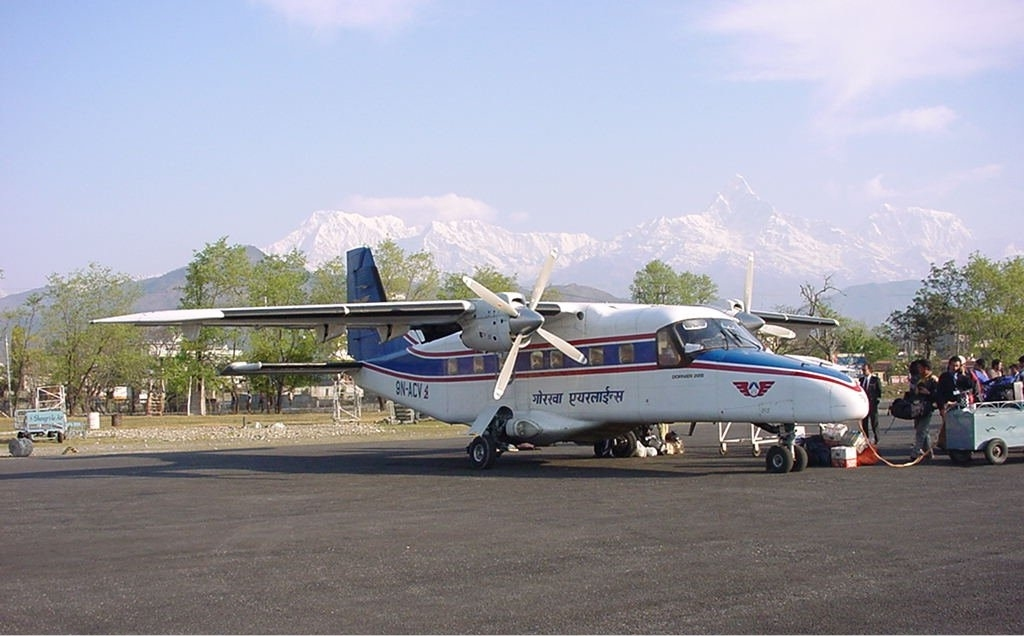
Gorkha Airlines in Pokhara Airport, Nepal

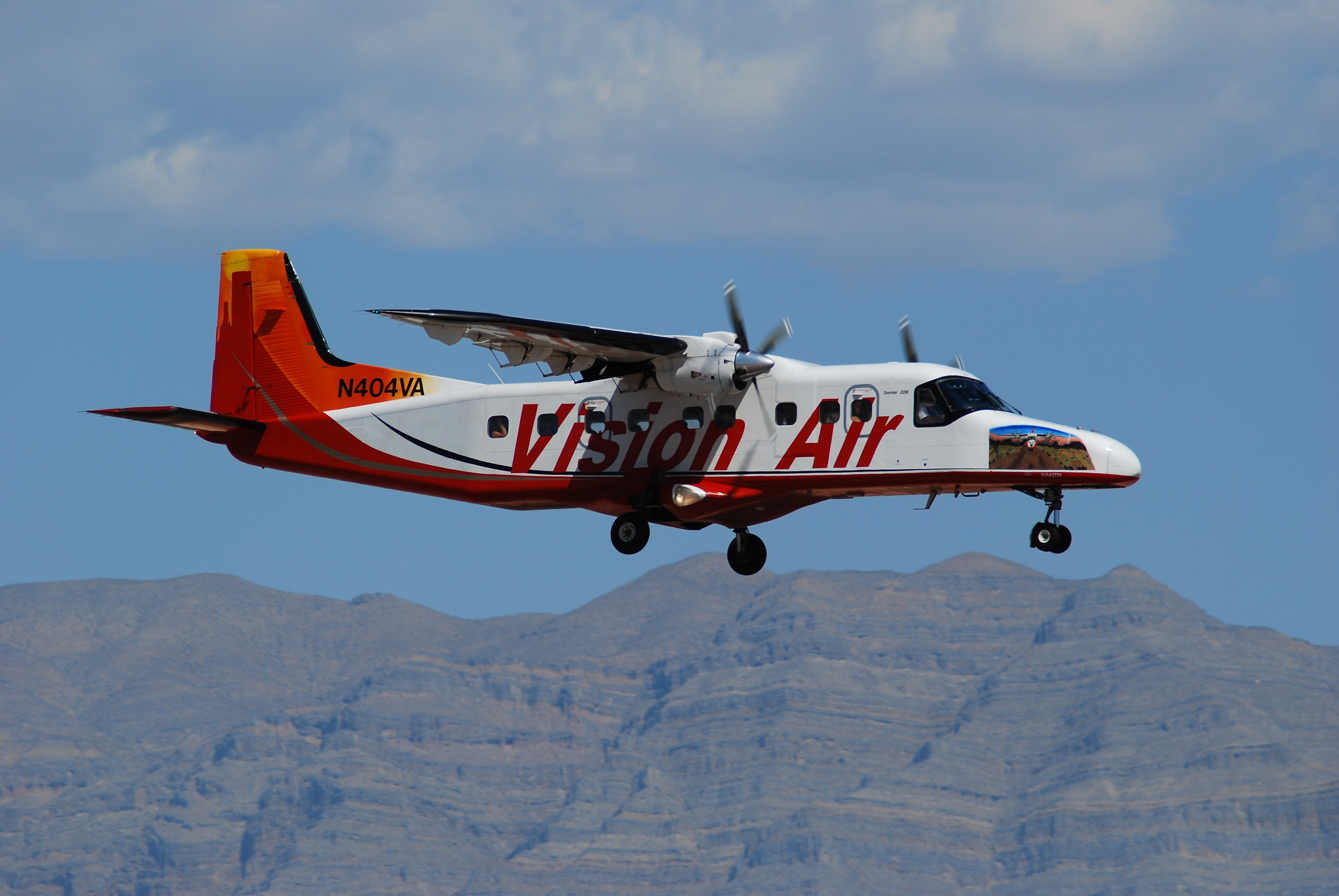
Vision Airlines at North Las Vegas Airport

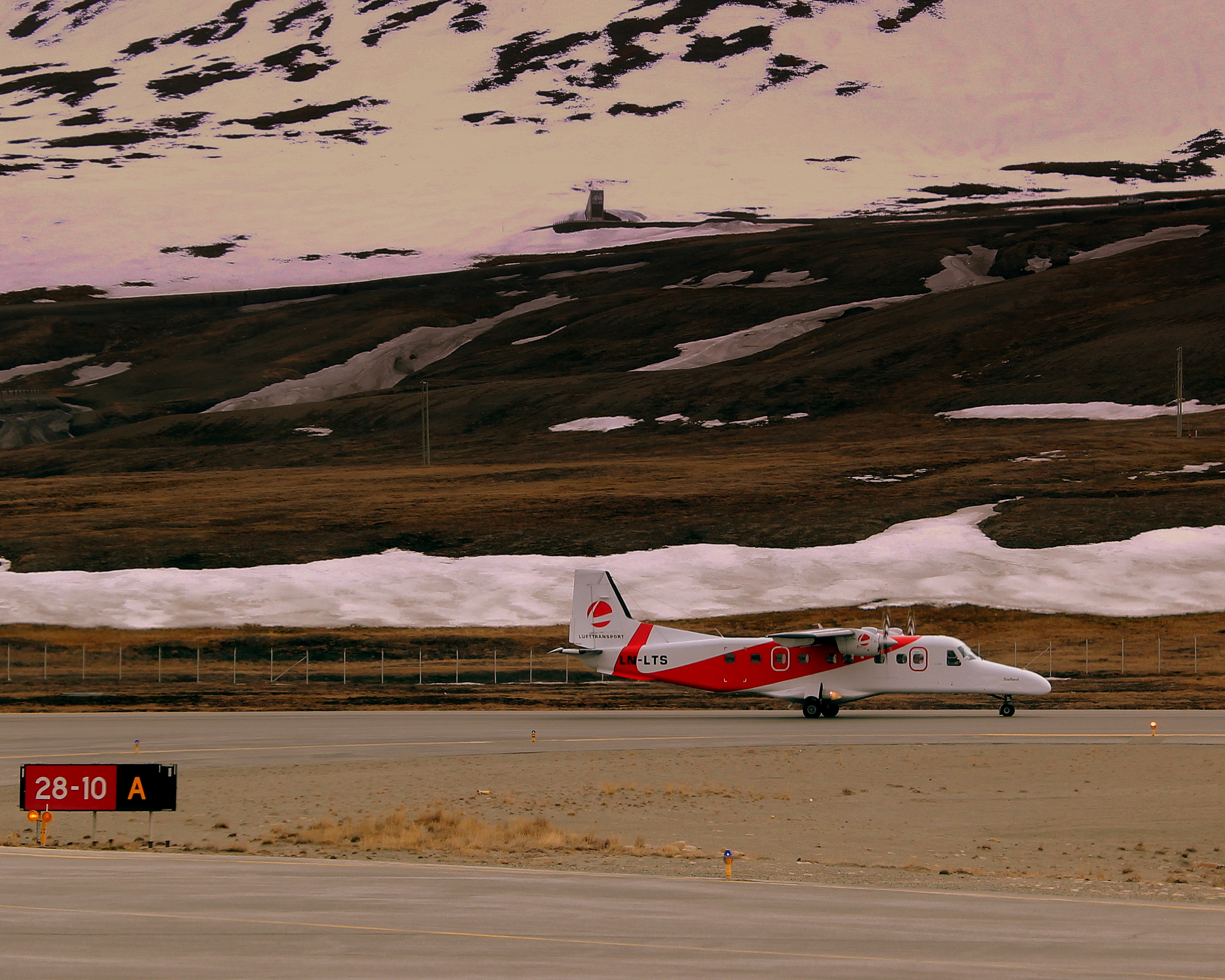
Lufttransport 228NG in Svalbard

- Aerocardal (3)
- Air Marshall Islands (2)
- Air West Coast (2)
- Alkan Air (2)
- Alliance Air (2)
- Arcus Air (2)
- Bighorn Airways (3)
- CorpFlite (1)
- Daily Air (4)
- Divi Divi Air (1)
- Dornier Aviation Nigeria (9)
- GAM Aviation (3)
- German Aerospace Center (2)
- Gorkha Airlines (2)
- Inter Island Airways (1)
- Island Aviation (3)
- Jagson Airlines (2)
- Lufttransport (2)
- National Cartographic Center of Iran (3)
- New Central Airservice (3)
- Sevenair (4)
- Sita Air (4)
- Summit Air (5)
- MAYAir (2)

Dornier 228-200NG/212NG:

- Lufttransport (2)
- New Central Airservice (6)
- Alliance Air (India) (1) + 1 on order

== Police, law enforcement, paramilitary operations ==
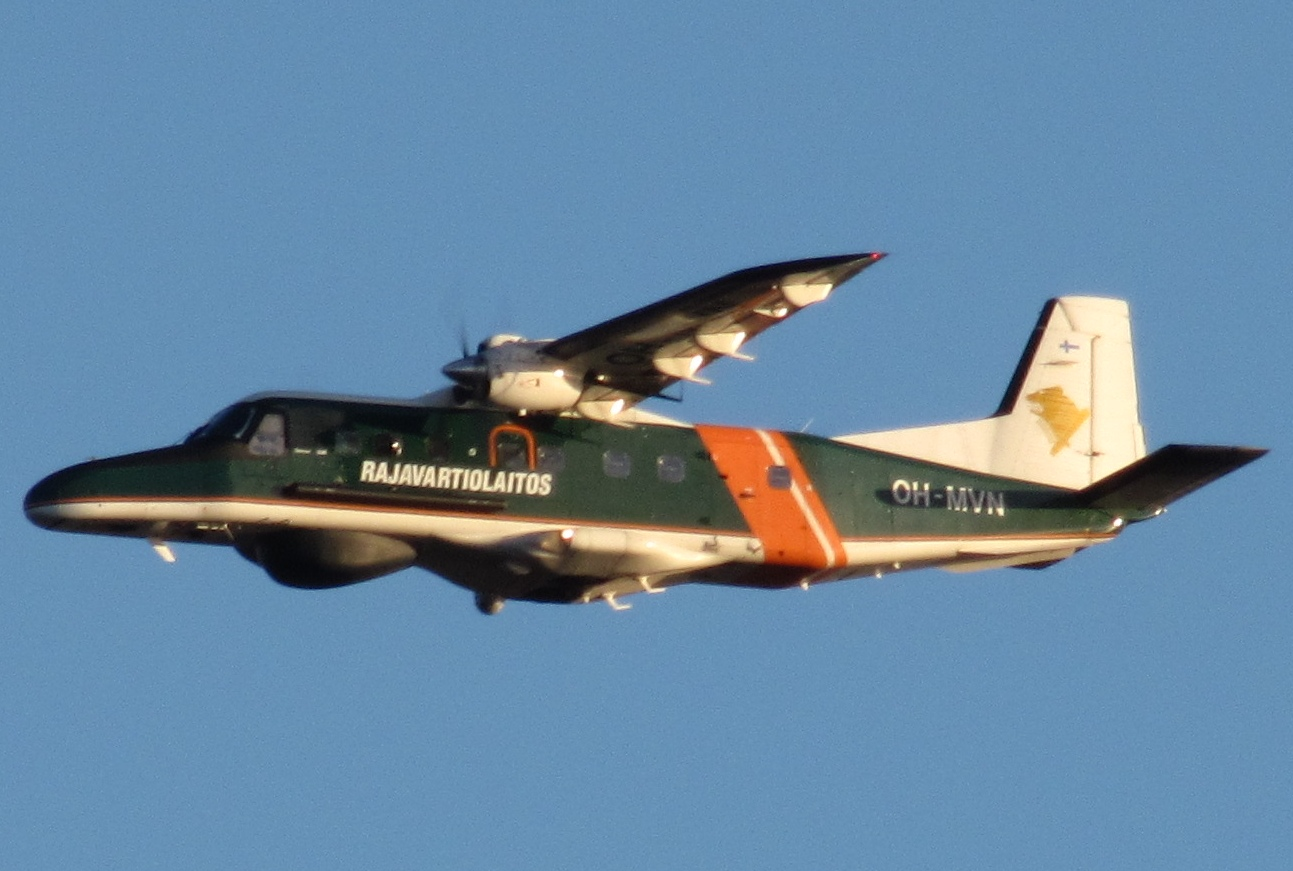
Finnish Border Guard

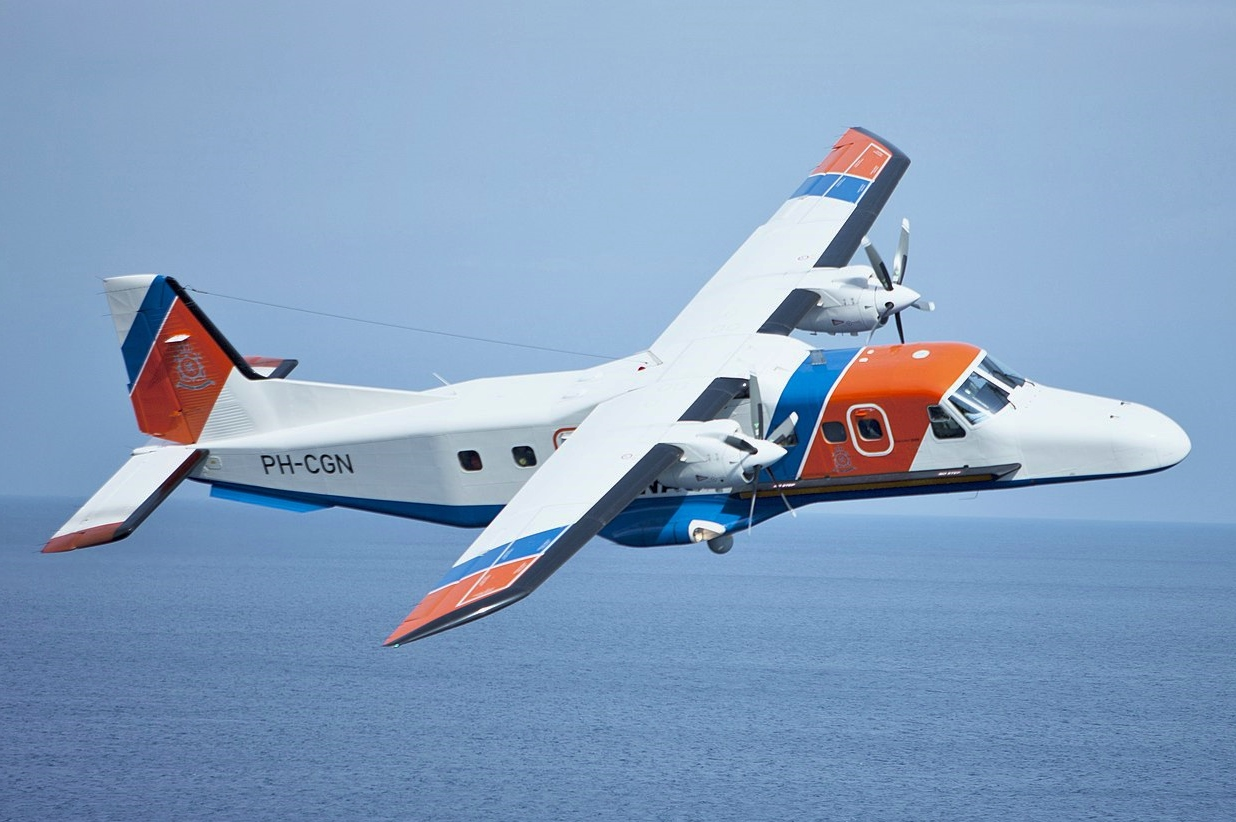
Netherlands Coastguard

Finland

- Finnish Border Guard

India

- Indian Coast Guard – 41 Dornier 228-101 maritime surveillance aircraft. 8 on order.

Iran

- Iranian Navy
- National Cartographic Center of Iran – 2 Dornier Do-228-212 used for aerial survey

Netherlands

- Netherlands Coastguard (2)

Oman

- Royal Oman Police Air Wing

Mauritius

- Mauritius Coast Guard - 3 Dornier Do-228-212 in service.

United Kingdom

- Marine Fisheries Agency
- Ministry of Defence (Wet Lease from Summit Air)

== Military operators ==
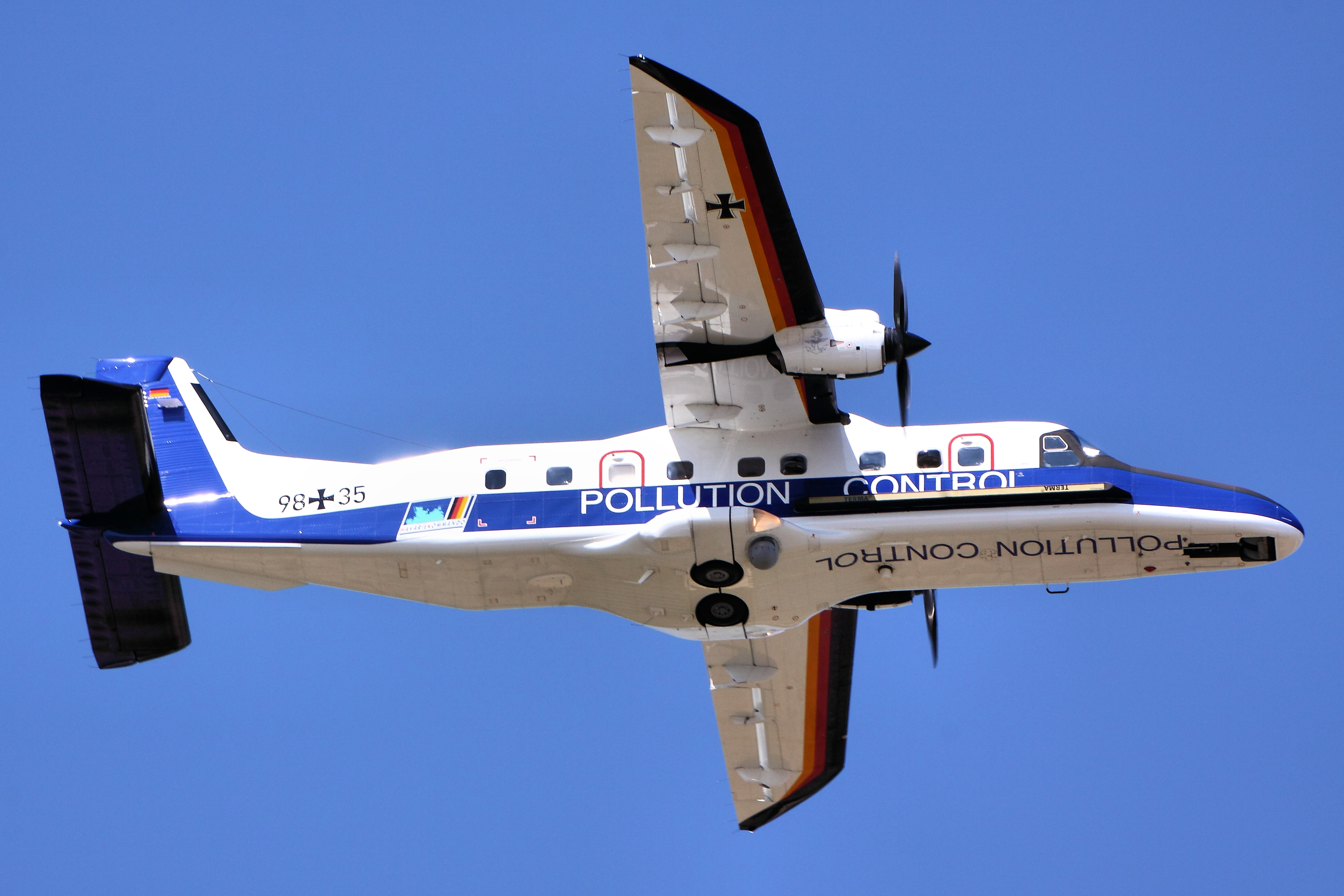
German Navy Pollution control

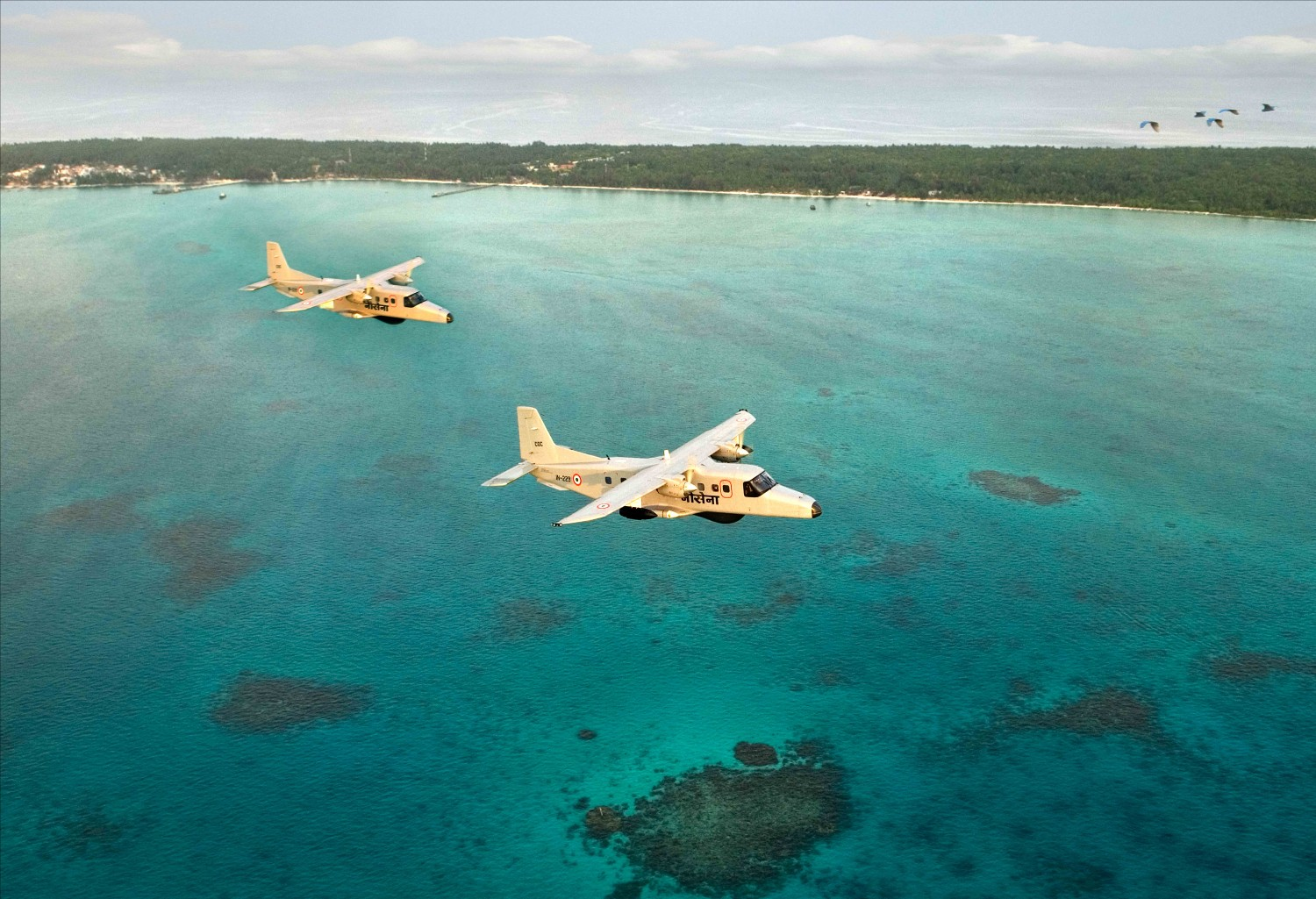
Indian Navy twins

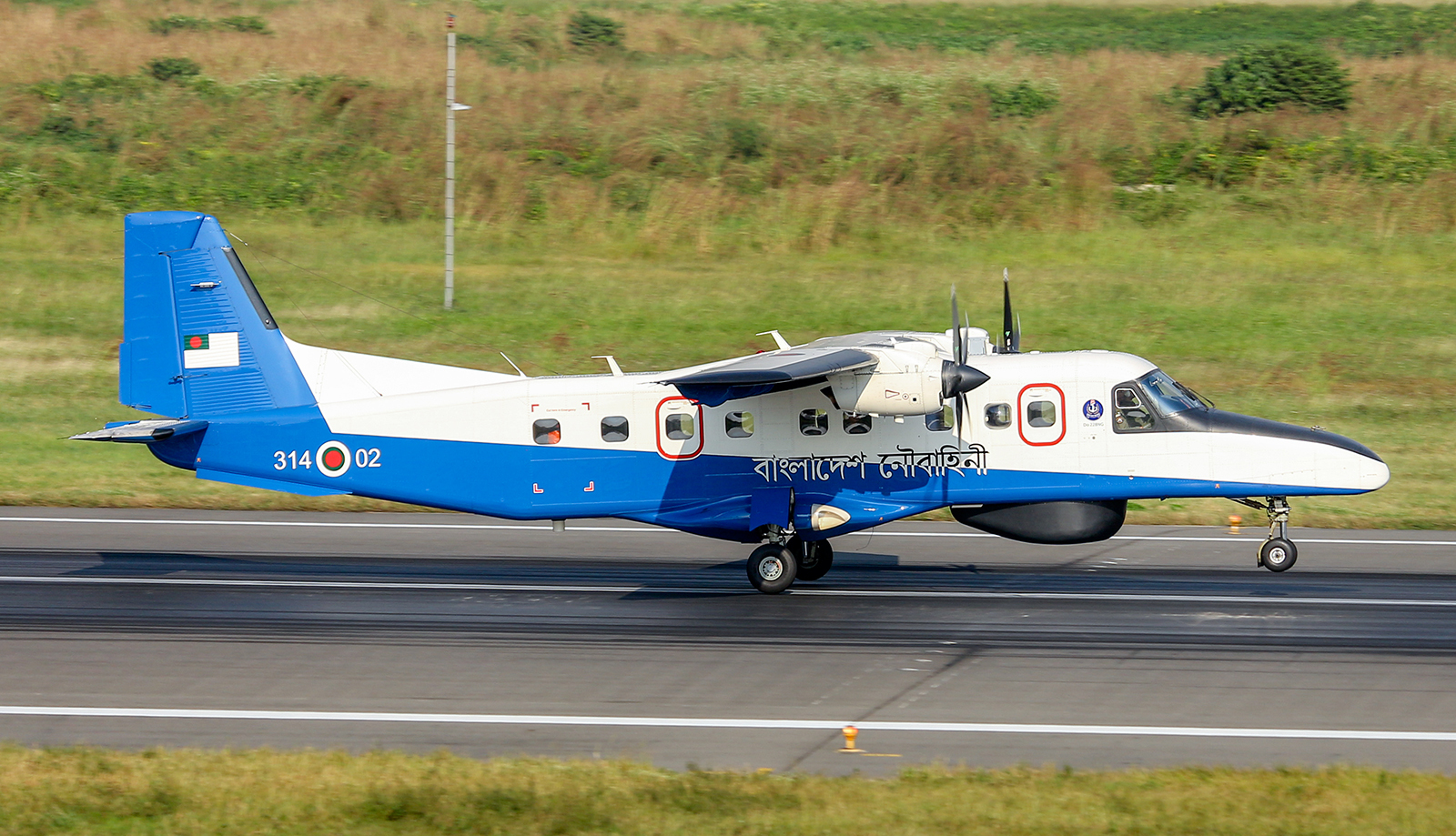
Bangladesh Navy Do-228NG MPA

Angola

- National Air Force of Angola

Bangladesh

- Bangladesh Navy – 4 Dornier 228NG MPA.

Germany

- Marineflieger – 2 Dornier 228NG (MPA, Recce)

Guyana

- Guyana Defence Force - 2 ordered from HAL. Delivered on 1st April 2024. Commissioned on 18 November 2024.

India

- Indian Air Force – operates 61 Dornier 228-201, 6 on order.
- Indian Navy – operates 29 Dornier 228-201, Includes 4 upgraded variants, 8 more on order. Rest being upgraded.
- DRDO – 1 Dornier 228 “Nabhratna” used as a flying test bed by LRDE

Italy

- Italian Army Aviation - 3

Malawi

- Military of Malawi – 3

Maldives

- Maldives National Defence Force

Niger

- Niger Air Force – one delivered in 1986

Nigeria

- Nigerian Air Force – 1

Seychelles

- Seychelles Air Force – 2, gifted by India

Sri Lanka

- Sri Lanka Air Force – 1, +1 on order from HAL

Thailand

- Royal Thai Navy – 7 MPA, locally designated B.LW.1 (Thai: บ.ลว.๑).

Venezuela

- Venezuelan Air Force – 3 + 7 orders

== Former military operators ==
Cape Verde

- Coast Guard of Cape Verde

Bhutan

- Royal Bhutan Army (Bhutan Army Air Wing)

Germany

- German Air Force
