= Machhendandi =

Machhedandi मच्छेडाडीँ
- Village
- Location in Nepal
- Coordinates: 27.22°N 86.04°E
- Country: Nepal
- Zone: Janakpur Zone
- District: Ramechhap District
- Municipality: Manthali
- Time zone: UTC+5:45 (Nepal Time)

Machhedandi is a small village in Manthali municipality. It has a population of about 500. Most of the inhabitants belong to the family group Subedi. Only 3 or 4 houses belong to other castes like Ghimire, K.C or Budhathoki. It has a moderate climate and is suitable to live. Most of the inhabitants migrated from Mahadevsthan VDC of the same district. It was regarded as besi (a place for living in the winter or for farming or as a temporary residence) and Mahadevsthan as gaun (permanent residence). Most of the people here are now permanently settled. It is one of the most populated villages of the district.

== Etymology ==
The word "Machhedandi" is a combination of two words "Machha" and "Dando" in which the former means fish and the later means a place at a higher altitude than its surroundings. The word Machhedandi means a fish-shaped place higher than its surroundings.
