= Ramechhap, Ramechhap =

Ramechhap Municipality रामेछाप नगरपालिका
- Motto: Shailung
- Location in Nepal
- Coordinates: 27°20′0″N 86°5′0″E
- Country: Nepal
- Province: Bagmati
- District: Ramechhap

Government
  - Mayor: Laba Shree Neupane
  - Deputy Mayor: Bala Kumari karki
- Elevation: 1,218 m (3,996 ft)

Population (2011)
  - Total: 28,612
- Time zone: UTC+5:45 (NST)
- Website: www.ramechhapmun.gov.np

Ramechhap Municipality is a municipality in Ramechhap District in Bagmati Province of Nepal. It was established on 2 December 2014 by merging the former village development committees Old-Ramechhap, Okhreni and Sukajor. At the time of the 2011 Nepal census it had a population of 28,612 people living in 6,126 individual households.

== Demographics ==
At the time of the 2011 Nepal census, Ramechhap Municipality had a population of 29,469. Of these, 54.1% spoke Nepali, 16.7% Magar, 14.8% Tamang, 10.9% Newar, 1.5% Sunwar, 1.3% Vayu, 0.2% Maithili, 0.1% Bhojpuri, 0.1% Majhi and 0.1% other languages as their first language.

In terms of ethnicity/caste, 23.6% were Newar, 21.9% Magar, 18.3% Chhetri, 15.2% Tamang, 3.6% Sunuwar, 3.3% Kami, 2.8% Hill Brahmin, 2.6% Hayu, 2.3% Sarki, 1.9% Damai/Dholi, 1.8% Majhi, 1.3% Gharti/Bhujel, 0.5% Sanyasi/Dasnami, 0.3% other Dalit, 0.1% Badi, 0.1% Pahari, 0.1% other Terai and 0.2% others.

In terms of religion, 95.96% were Hindu, 2.2% Musalman2.1% Buddhist, 1.05% Prakriti, 1.24% Christian and 0.2% others.

In terms of literacy, 62.6% could read and write, 3.2% could only read and 34.0% could neither read nor write.

== Transportation ==
Ramechhap Airport lies in the neighboring municipality of Manthali.
