= Tenzing-Hillary Airport =

Airport in Lukla, Nepal

Tenzing-Hillary Airport तेन्जिङ हिलारी विमानस्थल
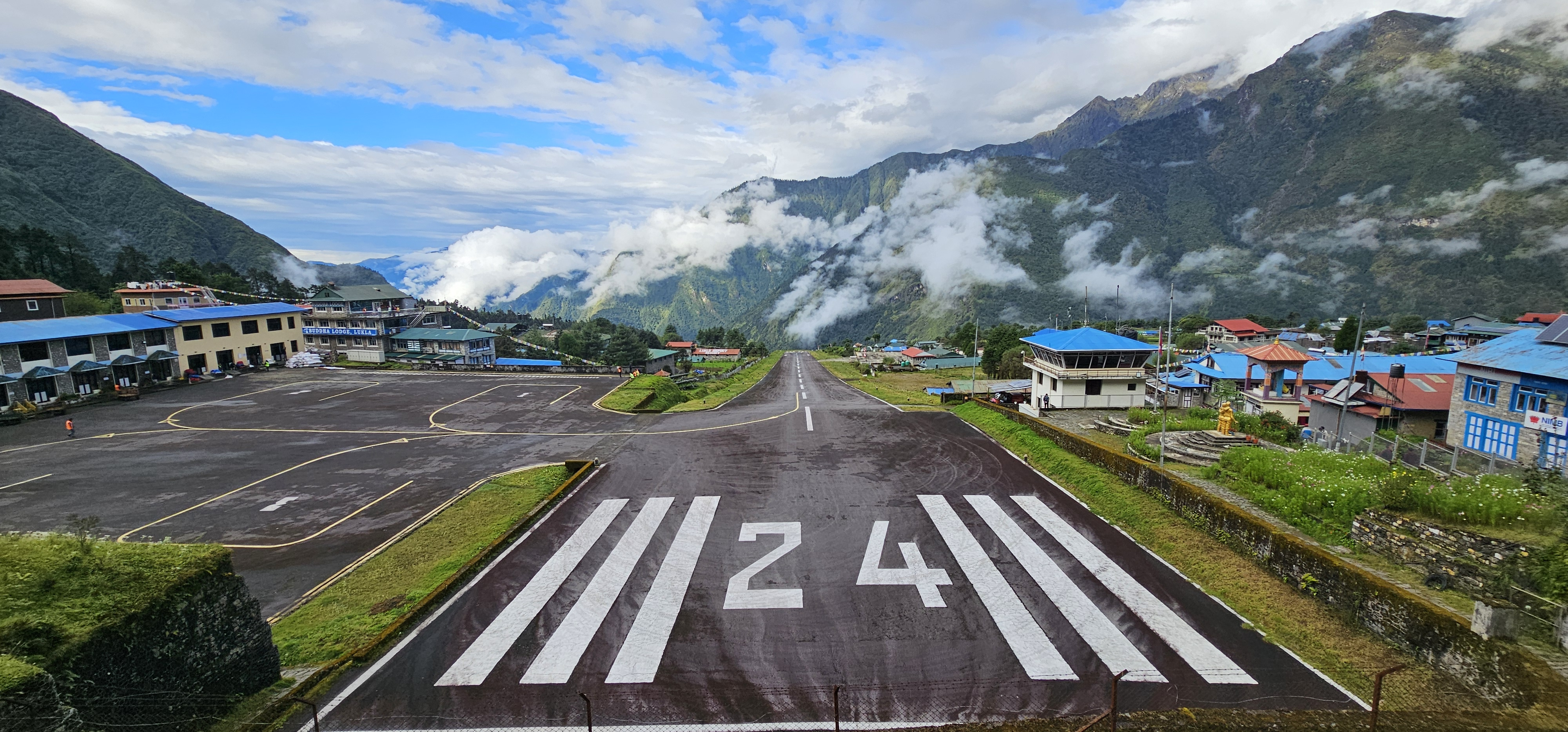
- IATA: LUA; ICAO: VNLK

Summary
- Airport type: Public
- Owner: Government of Nepal
- Operator: Civil Aviation Authority of Nepal
- Serves: Lukla, Nepal
- Hub for: Air Dynasty
- Time zone: NST (UTC+05:45)
- Elevation AMSL: 9,337 ft (2,846 m)
- Coordinates: 27°41′16″N 086°43′53″E
- Website: lukla.caanepal.gov.np

Map
- Location of airport in Nepal

Runways
Direction	Length		Surface
Direction	m	ft	Surface
06/24	527	1,729	Asphalt

Tenzing-Hillary Airport (Nepali: तेन्जिङ हिलारी विमानस्थल, IATA: LUA, ICAO: VNLK), also known as Lukla Airport, is a domestic airport and altiport in the town of Lukla, in Khumbu Pasanglhamu, Solukhumbu District, Koshi Province of Nepal. The airport has gained worldwide fame, not only for its unusual location, but also because it was rated the most dangerous airport in the world for more than 20 years by a program titled Most Extreme Airports, broadcast on the History Channel in 2010.

The airport is popular because it is considered the starting point for treks towards Mount Everest Base Camp. There are daily flights between Ramechhap or Kathmandu and Lukla during daylight hours in good weather. Although the flying distances are short, rain often occurs in Lukla while the sun is shining in Ramechhap or Kathmandu. High winds, cloud cover, and changing visibility often mean flights can be delayed or the airport closed. The airport is contained within a chain-link fence and is patrolled by the Armed Police Force Nepal, Nepal Civil Police or Nepali Army around the clock for security.

== Etymology ==
Tenzing–Hillary Airport is officially named after the Nepalese mountaineer Tenzing Norgay and the New Zealand mountaineer Edmund Hillary, the first people to reach the summit of Mount Everest.

The airport was previously known simply as Lukla Airport. It received its current name after Prithvi Subba Gurung, Nepal's Minister of Culture, Tourism and Civil Aviation at the time, proposed the renaming on 14 January 2008. On 10 February 2008, following approval by the Koirala Interim Cabinet, Lukla Airport was officially renamed Tenzing–Hillary Airport in honor of the first two people to summit Mount Everest.

== History ==
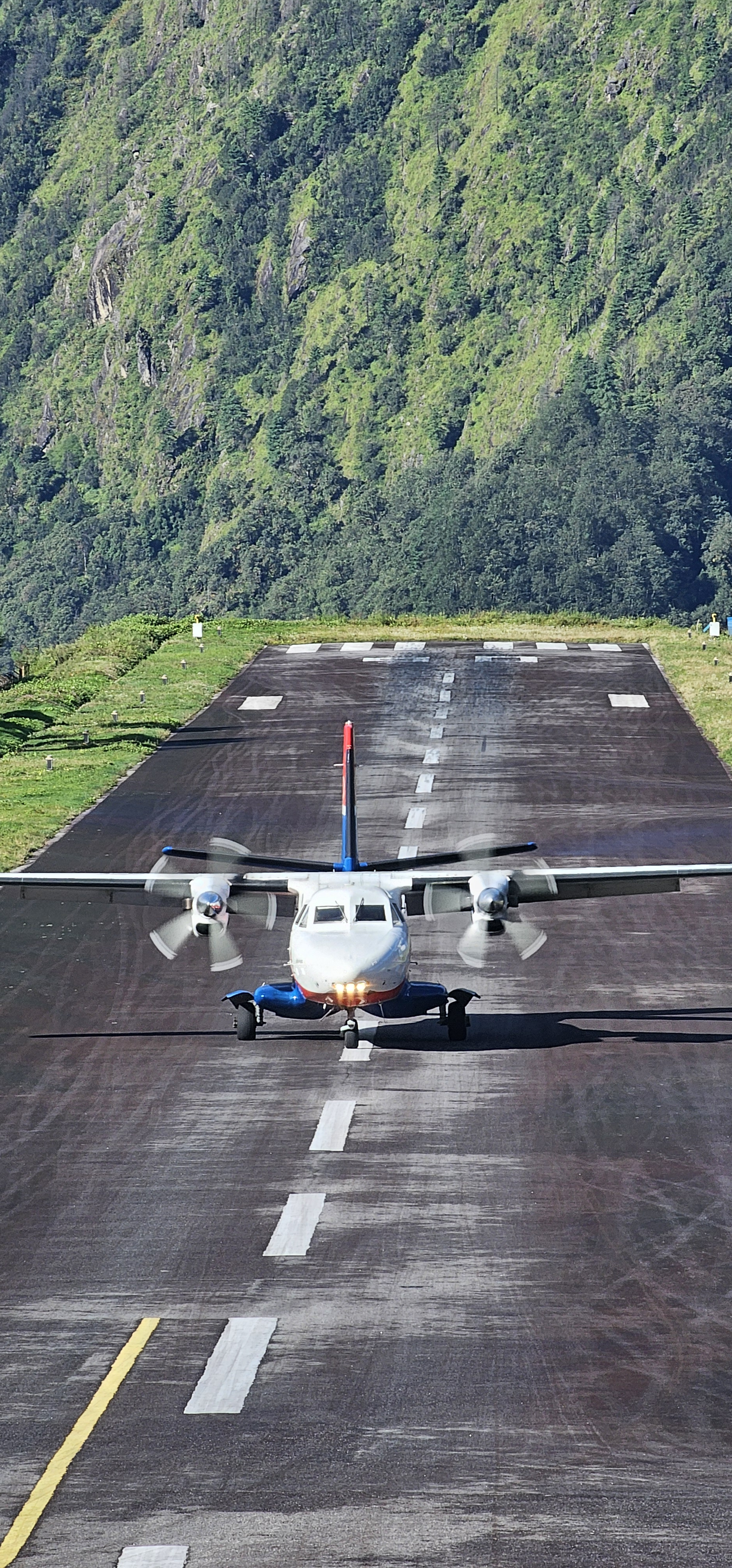
Lukla Airport 2026

The airport was built in 1964 under the supervision of Edmund Hillary, who originally intended to build it on flat farmland. However, local farmers did not want to give up their land, so the airport was built in its current position. Hillary bought the land from local Sherpas for USD 2,650 and involved them in building the facilities. It has been said that Hillary was unhappy with the runway's soil resistance, and that his solution was to buy local liquor for the Sherpas and ask them to perform a foot-stomping dance to flatten the land that served as the runway. The runway was paved in 2001.

In January 2008, the airport was renamed in honour of Tenzing Norgay and Sir Edmund Hillary, the first people confirmed to have reached the summit of Mount Everest, and also to mark their efforts in the construction of this airport.

== Facilities ==
Landing and taking off at Tenzing–Hillary Airport

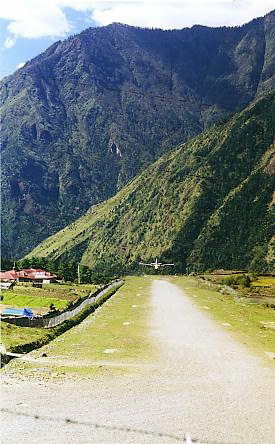
A plane landing in Tenzing-Hillary Airport in 1999, prior to paving of the runway

The airport's paved asphalt runway is accessible only to helicopters and small, fixed-wing, short-takeoff-and-landing aircraft such as the De Havilland Canada DHC-6 Twin Otter, Dornier 228, and Let L-410 Turbolet. The runway is 527 m (1,729 ft) × 30 m (98 ft) with an 11.7% gradient. The airport's elevation is 9,334 ft (2,845 m). The airport is used for passenger flights and for transporting most of the building materials and cargo to Lukla and other towns and villages to the north of Lukla, as there is no road to this region.

In the early morning, the wind is usually from the northeast, changing to a southwest wind from mid to late morning due to the action of the sun on the mountains to the north of Lukla. The airport regularly closes from mid to late morning due to the strong southwest winds that create crosswinds or tailwinds. Consequently, flights are usually scheduled for the early morning. A sudden loss of visibility preventing planes from landing under visual flight rules (VFR) will result in the immediate closure of the airport.

Keeping turnaround times to a minimum, planes will attempt to make as many flights as possible from either Ramechhap or Kathmandu to Lukla before the airport is closed. When Ramechhap airport is in use, shorter flight times from Ramechhap than from Kathmandu will allow more flights.

Although the airport is nominally open throughout the year, visibility problems close the airport 50% of the time during the monsoon season, with the consequent cancellation of 50% of flights. Due to the terrain and the low possibility of a safe go-around for a missed approach, there are no go-around procedures.

Tenzing–Hillary Airport has been referred to as the most dangerous airport in the world. Arriving and departing aircraft must use a single runway (06 for landing and 24 for takeoff). There is a low prospect of a successful go-around on a short final approach due to the terrain. There is high terrain immediately beyond the northern end of the runway and a steeply angled drop at the southern end of the runway into the valley below.

Due to the difficulties of successfully landing at the airport, the Civil Aviation Authority of Nepal sets high standards, according to which only experienced pilots, who have completed at least 100 short-takeoff-and-landing (STOL) missions, have over one year of STOL experience in Nepal, and have completed ten flights into Lukla with a certified instructor pilot, are allowed to land at the airport.

In October 2018 plans to expand the terminal and runway were published. The construction of five new helipads was planned to be completed by the end of July 2021.

== Airlines and destinations ==
As of October 2024 fixed wing flights continue to fly directly from KTM; though less frequently than in the past.

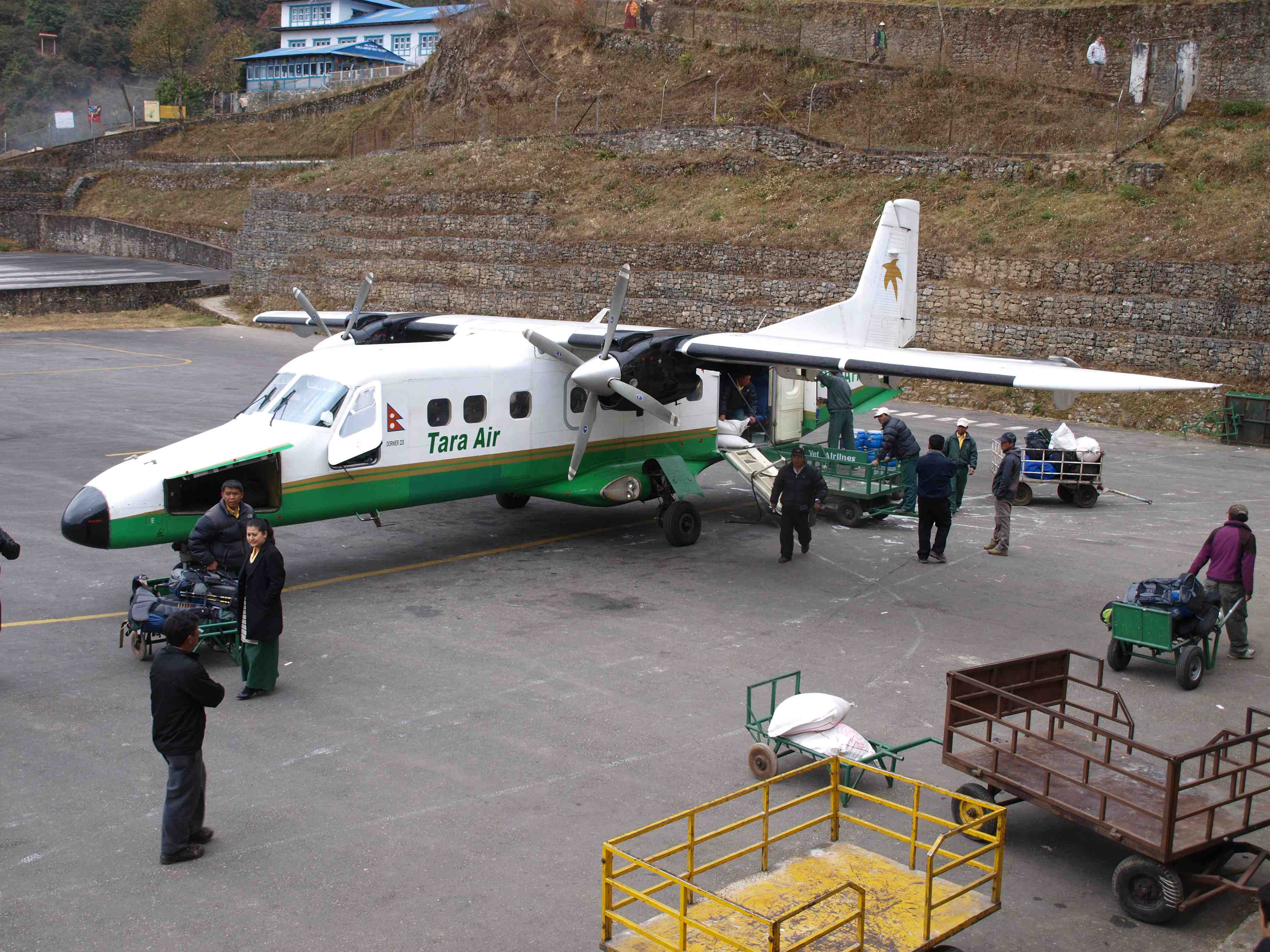
Tara Air Dornier 228 at Tenzing–Hillary Airport

Airlines	Destinations
Sita Air	Kathmandu, Manthali
Summit Air	Kathmandu, Manthali
Tara Air	Kathmandu, Manthali; Charter: Phaplu

The helicopter operator Air Dynasty offers helicopter operations out of its hub at Lukla Airport.

== Statistics ==
=== Passenger numbers ===
Year	Passengers
2003	70,959
2004	▲71,422
2005	▼53,943
2006	▲61,992
2007	▲80,733
2008	▲92,172
2009	▼88,881
2010	▲92,011
2011	▲93,292
2012	▲97,394
2013	▼85,179
2014	▲87,490
2015	▼81,174
2016	▲119,801
2017	▲146,879
2018	▼124,929
2019	▲129,508
2020	▼21,309
2021	▲228,967
2022	▼195,479
2023	▲262,118
2024	▼204,114
2025	▼137,207

== Accidents and incidents ==
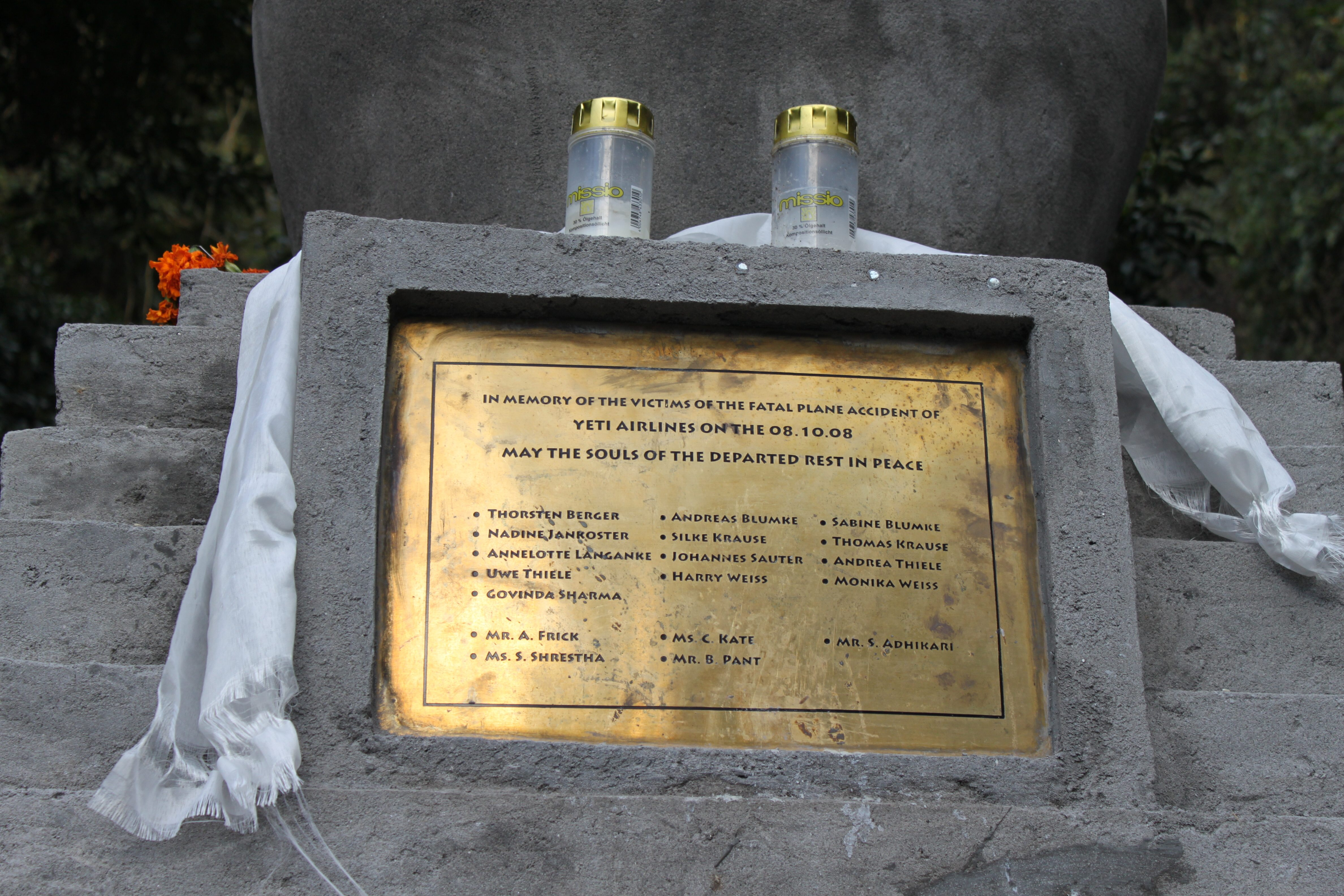
Memorial for the Yeti Airlines Flight 101 crash on 8 October 2008

- On 15 October 1973, a Royal Nepal Airlines DHC-6 Twin Otter 300 (registration 9N-ABG) was damaged beyond repair on landing. The three crew and three passengers were unhurt.
- On 9 June 1991, a Nepal Airlines DHC-6 Twin Otter 300 (registration 9N-ABA) from Kathmandu crashed at the airport while attempting to land following an unstabilized approach in bad weather. The three crew and fourteen passengers escaped with injuries. The damaged aircraft was determined to be beyond repair and written off.
- On 26 September 1992, a Royal Air Nepal Harbin Yunshuji Y-12-II (registered 9N-ACI) faltered during takeoff and was damaged beyond repair. All twelve passengers and two crew survived.
- On 25 May 2004, while on approach to the airport, a Yeti Airlines DHC-6 Twin Otter 300 (registration 9N-AFD) from Kathmandu crashed into Lamjura Hill in heavy clouds. No passengers were on board; all three crew members were killed. The Nepalese accident investigation committee concluded that the captain provided inaccurate information about his position to the Area Control Centre.
- On 30 June 2005, a Gorkha Airlines Dornier 228 skidded off the runway while attempting to land. The nine passengers and three crew suffered minor injuries. The aircraft was reportedly withdrawn from service and written off after the accident.
- On 8 October 2008, Yeti Airlines Flight 101, a DHC-6 Twin Otter 300 (registration 9N-AFE) crashed on final approach and caught fire, killing eighteen passengers and crew. The aircraft's captain was the only survivor. Video of the incident showed inclement weather at the time of the incident.
- On 26 September 2013, an Air Dynasty helicopter (registration 9N-AEX) crashed when the rear rotor touched the barbed wire of the compound wall at the airport. All three passengers and the captain survived.
- On 27 May 2017, Summit Air Flight 409, performing a freight flight on a Let L-410 from Kathmandu to Lukla with three crew, was on final approach to Lukla's runway 06 at about 14:04L (08:19Z) with poor visibility when the aircraft lost altitude and touched a tree short of the runway before contacting ground about 3 metres/10 feet below the runway level. The aircraft slid down the slope before coming to a rest about 200 metres below the runway level. The captain was killed and the first officer, Shrijan Manandhar, died in hospital almost eight hours later. The third crew member received injuries and was evacuated to Kathmandu the following day after the weather had cleared.
- On 14 April 2019, at 9:10 am a Summit Air Let L-410 Turbolet aircraft, registration 9N-AMH, with no passengers on board veered right and departed the runway on take-off from Lukla Airport and struck a Manang Air Eurocopter AS 350B3e helicopter registration 9N-ALC on the helipad 30 to 50 metres from the runway, destroying both the plane and the helicopter. A second helicopter, Shree Airlines Eurocopter AS 350 registered 9N-ALK, sustained little or no damage. The three reported fatalities were the co-pilot of the plane, a police officer on airport security duty who died in the crash and a second police officer who was critically injured and airlifted to Kathmandu, where he died in hospital. Among the four reported injured were the pilot of the plane and a Manang Air helicopter pilot, who were flown to a hospital in Kathmandu, where they were reported to be out of danger.

== See also ==
- Altiport
- Syangboche Airport
- Phaplu Airport
- List of airports in Nepal
