= 1993 Everest Air Dornier 228 crash =

1993 aviation accident in Nepal

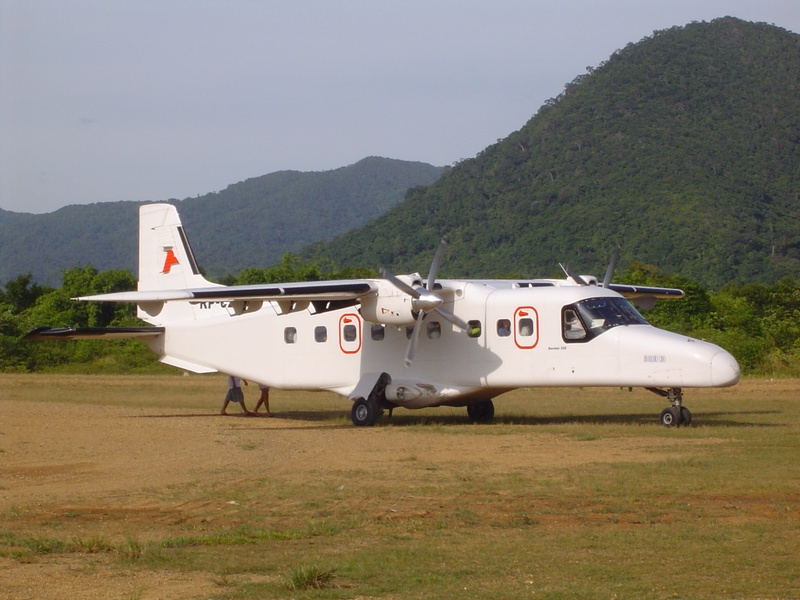
- A Dornier 228 similar to the one involved

Accident
- Date: 31 July 1993
- Summary: Controlled flight into terrain
- Site: Near Bharatpur, Nepal; 27.738048°N 84.414139°E

Aircraft
- Aircraft type: Dornier 228-101
- Operator: Everest Air
- Registration: 9N-ACL
- Flight origin: Tribhuvan International Airport
- Destination: Bharatpur Airport
- Occupants: 19
- Passengers: 16
- Crew: 3
- Fatalities: 19
- Survivors: 0

On 31 July 1993, a Dornier 228 passenger turboprop operated by Nepalese airline Everest Air crashed in Tanahun District near Chule Ghopte hill, Nepal. The crash killed all of the 19 passengers and crew on board.

== Aircraft ==
The aircraft involved was a Dornier 228 bearing the registration 9N-ACL. It was built by Dornier Flugzeugwerke in 1984 and was operated by several German airlines and later in the Marshall Islands before being purchased by Everest Air in 1992.

== Accident ==
The aircraft was flying from Tribhuvan International Airport in Kathmandu to Bharatpur Airport. There were sixteen passengers, two pilots and a flight attendant on board. After taking off at 14:29 local time (10:29 UTC), there was normal contact until 14:45. After that time, contact was lost. The plane crashed at 14:51. The wreckage was found on Chule Ghopte hill.

== Passengers and crew ==
The plane was flown by a Nepali captain and an Indian first officer. Another pilot of Nepal Airlines presumed that the co-pilot was unaware of the mountainous terrain of Nepal. Most of the Nepali passengers were employees of the Ministry of Health on their way to Terrai areas affected by the 1993 Nepal floods.

Nationality	Fatalities		Total
Nationality	Passengers	Crew	Total
Nepal	14	2	16
India	-	1	1
Japan	1	-	1
Hungary	1	-	1
Total	16	3	19

== Investigation ==
The Government of Nepal set up an investigation committee a few days after the accident. It is assumed that the failing Non-Directional Beacon at Bharatpur Airport led to the accident. The device was not working due to recent heavy flooding in the area.

== See also ==
- List of airplane accidents in Nepal
