= Summit Air Flight 409 =

2017 aviation accident in Nepal

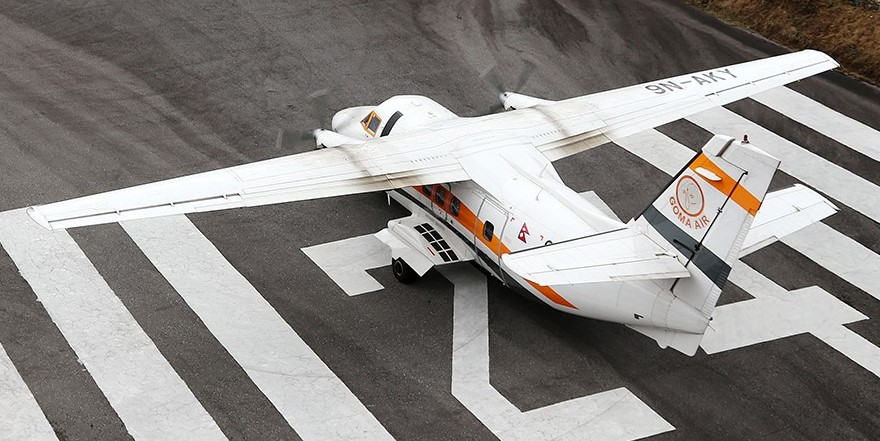
- 9N-AKY, the aircraft involved in the accident, pictured in 2016

Accident
- Date: 27 May 2017
- Summary: Crashed short of runway in low visibility
- Site: Near Lukla Airport, Lukla, Nepal; 27.68526°N 86.72646°E

Aircraft
- Aircraft type: Let L-410UVP-E
- Operator: Summit Air
- Registration: 9N-AKY
- Flight origin: Tribhuvan International Airport, Kathmandu, Nepal
- Destination: Tenzing–Hillary Airport, Lukla, Nepal
- Occupants: 3
- Passengers: 0
- Crew: 3
- Fatalities: 2
- Injuries: 1
- Survivors: 1

On 27 May 2017, a Let L-410 Turbolet operating as Summit Air Flight 409 crashed short of the runway whilst attempting to land at Tenzing–Hillary Airport in Nepal. It was on final approach when the aircraft hit trees short of the runway and subsequently slid down a slope before coming to rest about 200 metres (656 ft) below runway level and 40 metres (131 ft) short of the runway. The captain and the first officer died as a result of the accident, while the cabin crew member received injuries and survived.

== Accident ==
At about 14:04 local time, the aircraft was on final approach to Runway 06 of Tenzing-Hillary Airport, on a routine flight from Tribhuvan International Airport, when it descended below the minimum safety altitude just off the runway and impacted with a tree and contacted ground three metres below the runway. It then slid over 200 meters down a ravine. CCTV footage released by the airport showed the aircraft dipping below the runway level and smoke rising from the wreckage. Witnesses stated that the weather conditions had been foggy, and that visibility was quite low. The airport does not possess any sort of navigational equipment, requiring pilots to land via visual approach. The up-slope runway 06 is without any instrument approach guidance. At the time of the accident, local visibility was substantially reduced by ground fog.

== Aircraft ==
The aircraft involved in the crash was a Let L-410, built in 2014 for Goma Air, registration 9N-AKY. The aircraft was involved in a prior minor accident on 2 June 2015, where the flight from Jomsom landed in Pokhara with the nose gear retracted. All 18 passengers on board were safe, but the aircraft suffered damage to its nose.

== Victims ==
The Captain, 48 year-old Parash Kumar Rai, had over 9000 flight hours logged, and since joining the airline, had flown over 1900 hours on L-410 aircraft. He died shortly after being pulled from the wreckage. The co-pilot, Shreejan Manandhar, 27, died at 21:30 local time in intensive care at Lukla Hospital. The cabin crew member survived the crash and was soon medically evacuated to Kathmandu for further treatment.

== Investigation ==
In December 2017, an investigation committee of the Civil Aviation Authority of Nepal submitted its final report on the accident and concluded that "Very low visibility" was the cause of the accident. As the aircraft was flying through dense fog for several minutes before the approach, it missed the runway of Lukla Airport. The report furthermore revealed that both air traffic control of Lukla Airport (who did not close the airport despite the foggy weather) and the crew of Flight 409, who are also suspected to have been stressed and fatigued, had violated standard operating procedures. Lastly, the committee suggested that a runway extension of Lukla Airport should be considered, which would make the airport, where several accidents have occurred in the past, safer.
