= Sanghutar =

Sanghutar साँघुटार
- Village development committee
- Location in Nepal
- Coordinates: 27.36°N 86.21°E
- Country: Nepal
- Zone: Janakpur Zone
- District: Ramechhap District

Population (1991)
  - Total: 2,177
- Time zone: UTC+5:45 (Nepal Time)

Sanghutar is a village development committee in Ramechhap District in the Janakpur Zone of north-eastern Nepal. At the time of the 1991 Nepal census it had a population of 2,177 people living in 394 individual households. The VDC has a small market called Sanghutar Bazaar, situated in the bank of the Likhu River and bordering Okhaldhunga District. The bazaar is flat land near to the bridge (Sanghu in Nepali); therefore, its name is Sanghutar. It is a main commercial center of many neighboring villages of Ramechhap and Okhaldhunga District with a higher secondary school called Himaganga.
