= Bharatpur Airport =

Airport in Bagmati Province, Nepal

Bharatpur Airport भरतपुर विमानस्थल
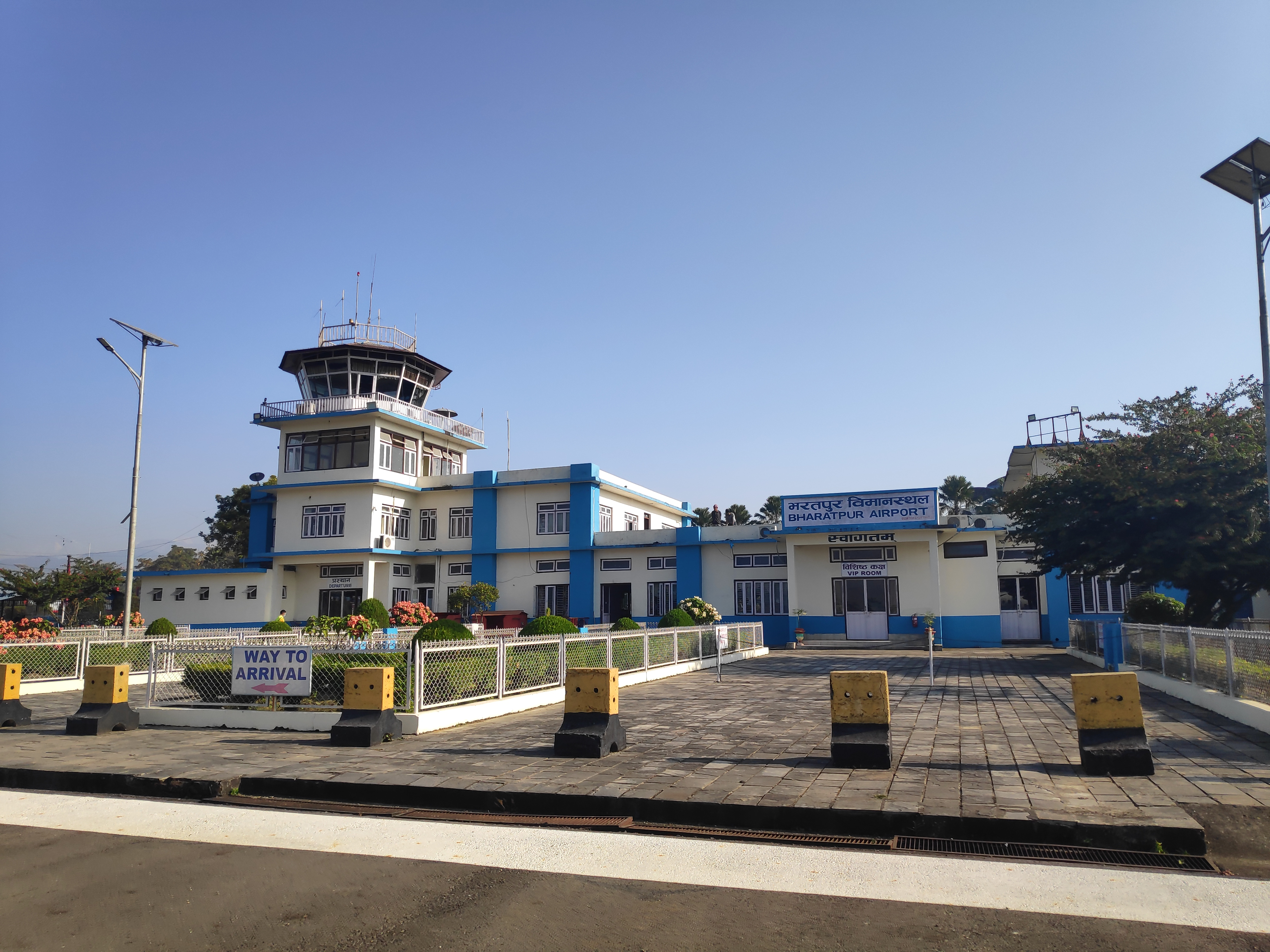
- IATA: BHR; ICAO: VNBP

Summary
- Airport type: Public
- Owner: Government of Nepal
- Operator: Civil Aviation Authority of Nepal
- Serves: Bharatpur, Nepal
- Elevation AMSL: 600 ft (180 m)
- Coordinates: 27°40′41″N 84°25′46″E
- Website: bharatpur.caanepal.gov.np

Map
- Location of airport in Nepal

Runways
| Direction | Length | | Surface |
| Direction | m | ft | Surface |
|---|---|---|---|
| 15/33 | 1,158 | 3,799 | Asphalt |

Bharatpur Airport (Nepali: भरतपुर विमानस्थल) (IATA: BHR, ICAO: VNBP) is a domestic airport located in Bharatpur serving Chitwan District, a district in Bagmati Province in Nepal. The airport is one of two airports in the vicinity of Bharatpur Metropolitan City, the other being Meghauli Airport. It serves as the main tourist gateway to Chitwan National Park.

== History ==
This airport was built in 1958 as part of the resettlement and malaria control program in the Chitwan Valley, with the assistance of the Government of the United States of America. The first passenger flight landed at the airport on 5 March 1965. From 1981 to 1985, the airport was shut down due political instabilities in Southern Nepal. In 2005, a new terminal was built and the 1158-metre runway was paved to enable medium-sized aircraft.

A proposal for further expansion to provide additional services and expand land coverage was passed in 2019. In 2023, the foundation stone for a new terminal building was laid by Prime Minister Pushpa Dahal.

== Facilities ==
The airport resides at an elevation of 600 feet (183 m) above mean sea level. It has one runway, which measures 1,158 by 30 metres (3,799 ft × 98 ft).

== Airlines and destinations ==
| Airlines | Destinations |
|---|---|
| Buddha Air | Kathmandu, Pokhara–International, Siddharthanagar |
| Guna Airlines | Kathmandu, Pokhara |

== Incidents and accidents ==
- 31 July 1993 – An Everest Air flight operated on a Dornier 228-101, on a flight from Kathmandu to Bharatpur, struck a mountain and crashed while approaching Bharatpur. All 3 crew and 16 passengers were killed.

== See also ==
- List of airports in Nepal
