= Ramechhap Airport =

Ramechhap Airport रामेछाप विमानस्थल
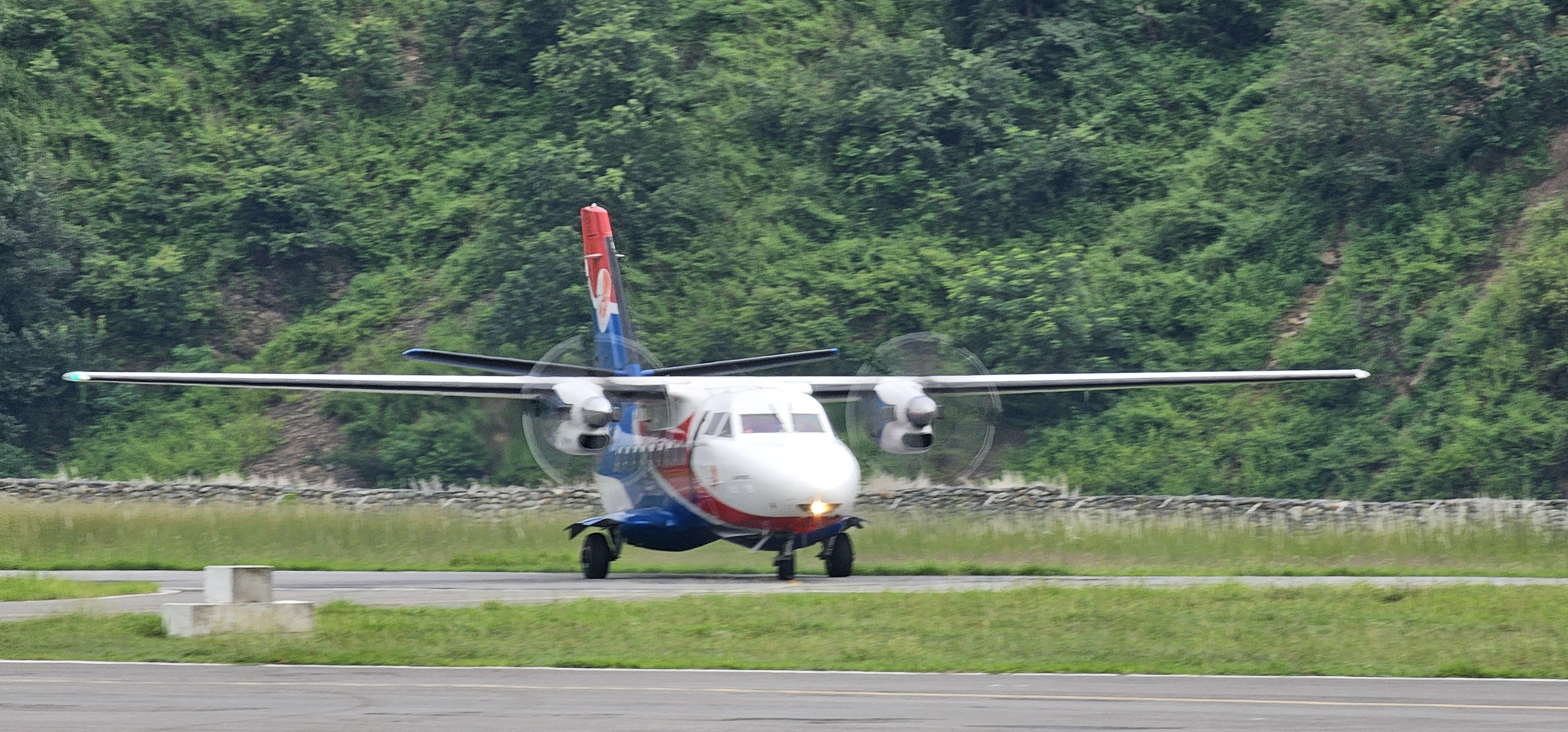
- IATA: RHP; ICAO: VNRC

Summary
- Airport type: Public
- Owner: Government of Nepal
- Operator: Civil Aviation Authority of Nepal
- Serves: Manthali and Ramechhap, Nepal
- Elevation AMSL: 1,555 ft (474 m)
- Coordinates: 27°23′38″N 86°03′41″E
- Website: ramechhap.caanepal.gov.np

Map
- Location of airport in Nepal

Runways
Direction	Length		Surface
Direction	m	ft	Surface
03/21	530	1,739	Concrete

Ramechhap Airport (IATA: RHP, ICAO: VNRC) is a domestic airport serving the municipality of Manthali, the district headquarters of Ramechhap District located in the Tamakoshi River valley in Bagmati Province in Nepal. As of October 2022, most flights to Lukla Airport are operated from Ramechhap Airport.

== History ==
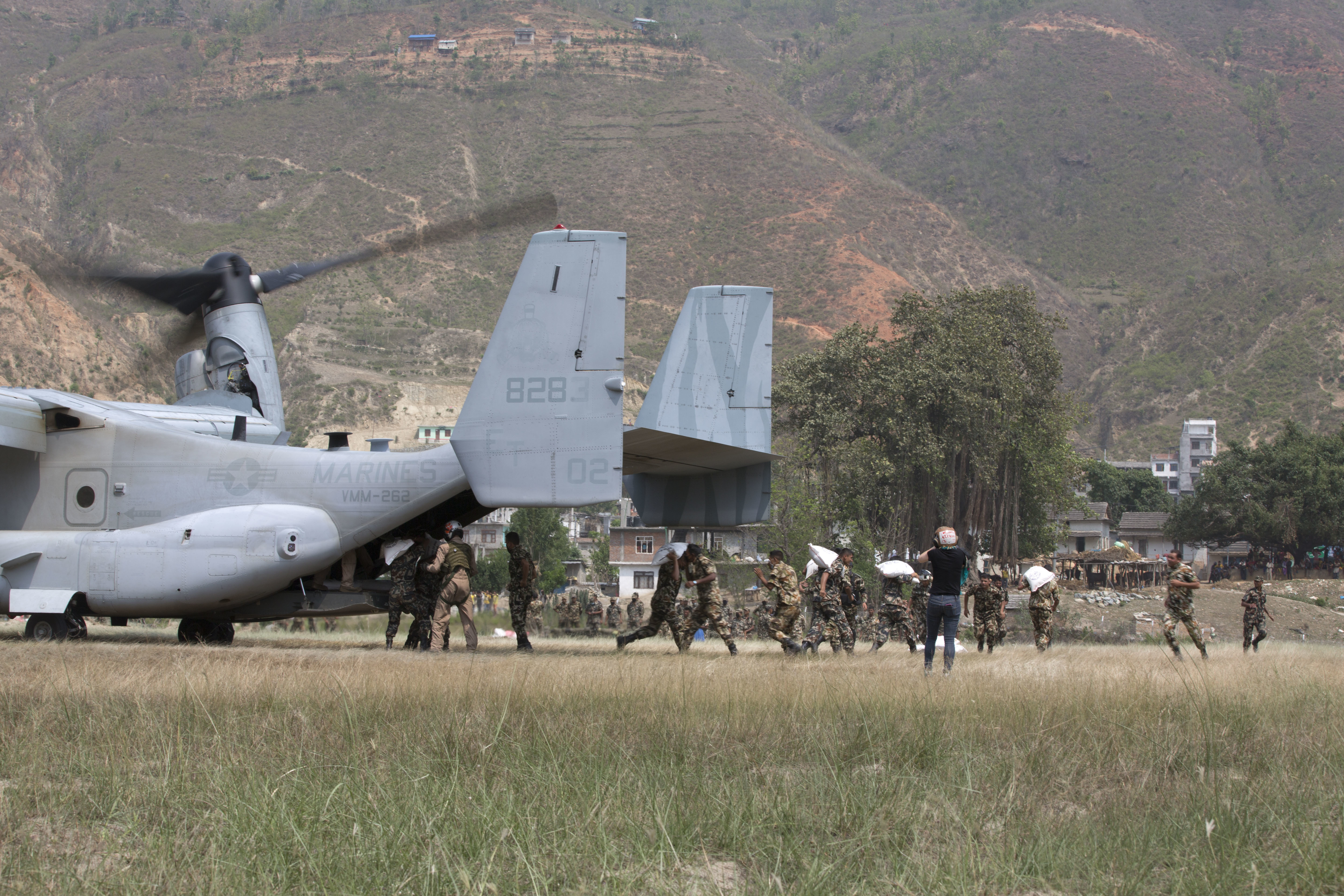
Nepalese service members offload supplies from a U.S. Marine Corps MV-22 Osprey assigned to Joint Task Force 505 humanitarian assistance and disaster relief at Manthali, the 2015 earthquake.

The airport was opened in October 1979. In 2015, the airport was closed for 13 months to allow runway renovations and upgrade from a clay and grass surface to asphalt, reopening in August 2016.

In 2019, as the sole runway of Tribhuvan International Airport in Kathmandu was being renovated and the airport was closed over night, all flights to Lukla were operated from Ramechhap Airport, the closest airport to Kathmandu, as these flights need to take off early in the morning to not get caught in dangerous winds in Lukla. During peak, the airport served 24 flights per day, However, the airport had serious problems handling the mass of tourists traveling to Lukla. Following this, plans were developed to upgrade the airport. By 2020, flights to Lukla were operated from Kathmandu again, and with Tara Air's discontinuation of the flight to Kathmandu, the airport was left without scheduled operations.

In 2022, the Civil Aviation Authority of Nepal decided that flight to Lukla were to be operated from Ramechhap Airport instead of Kathmandu again. Despite this being the second instance, critics argued that the airport and its surrounding infrastructure was still not sufficiently developed.

== Facilities ==
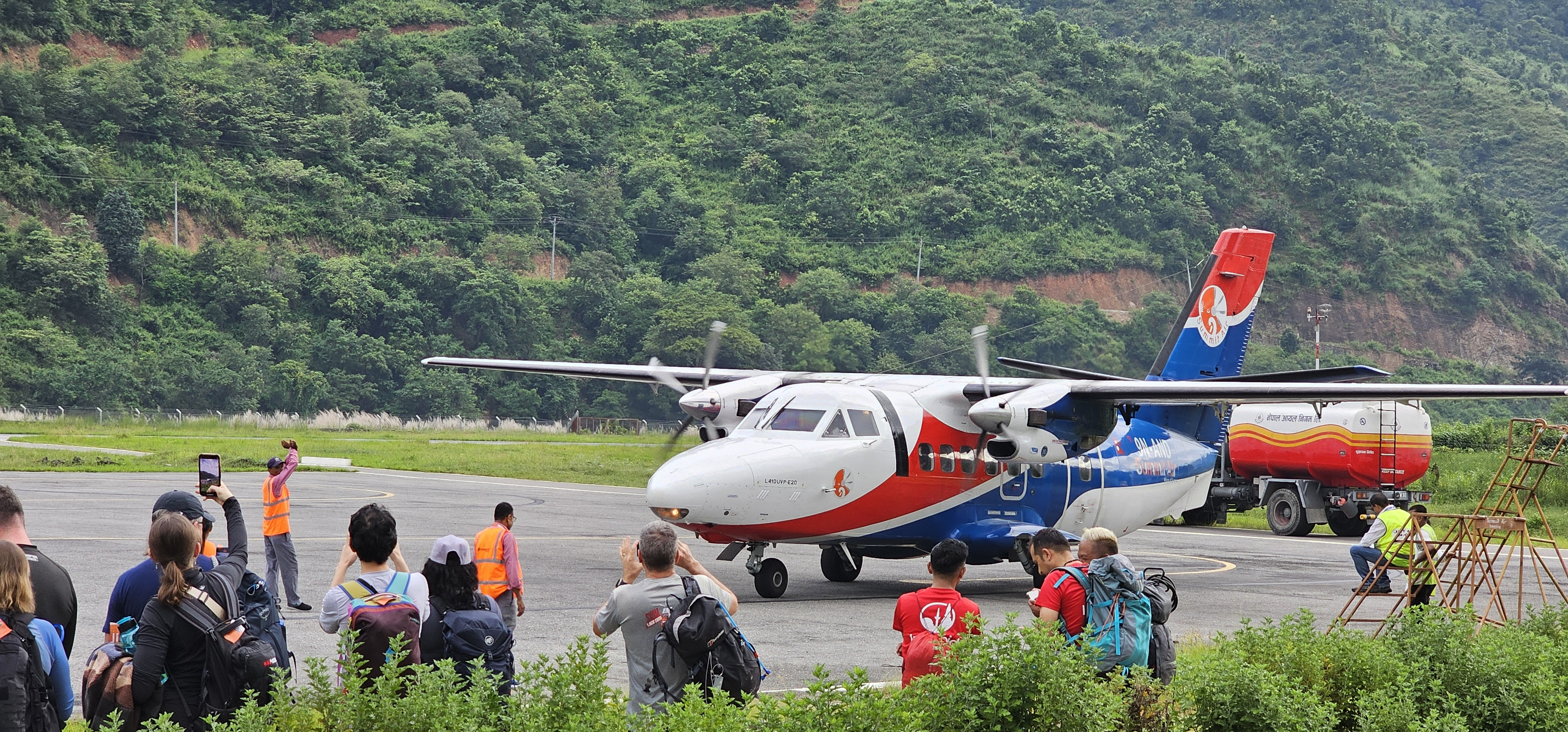
Ramechap Airport

The airport is at an elevation of 1,555 feet (474 m) above mean sea level. It has one runway which is 530 metres (1,739 ft) in length. The runway is 20 m wide in breadth and build of Asphalt Concrete. Parking capacity of Manthali airport is 4, D228 Type Aircraft.

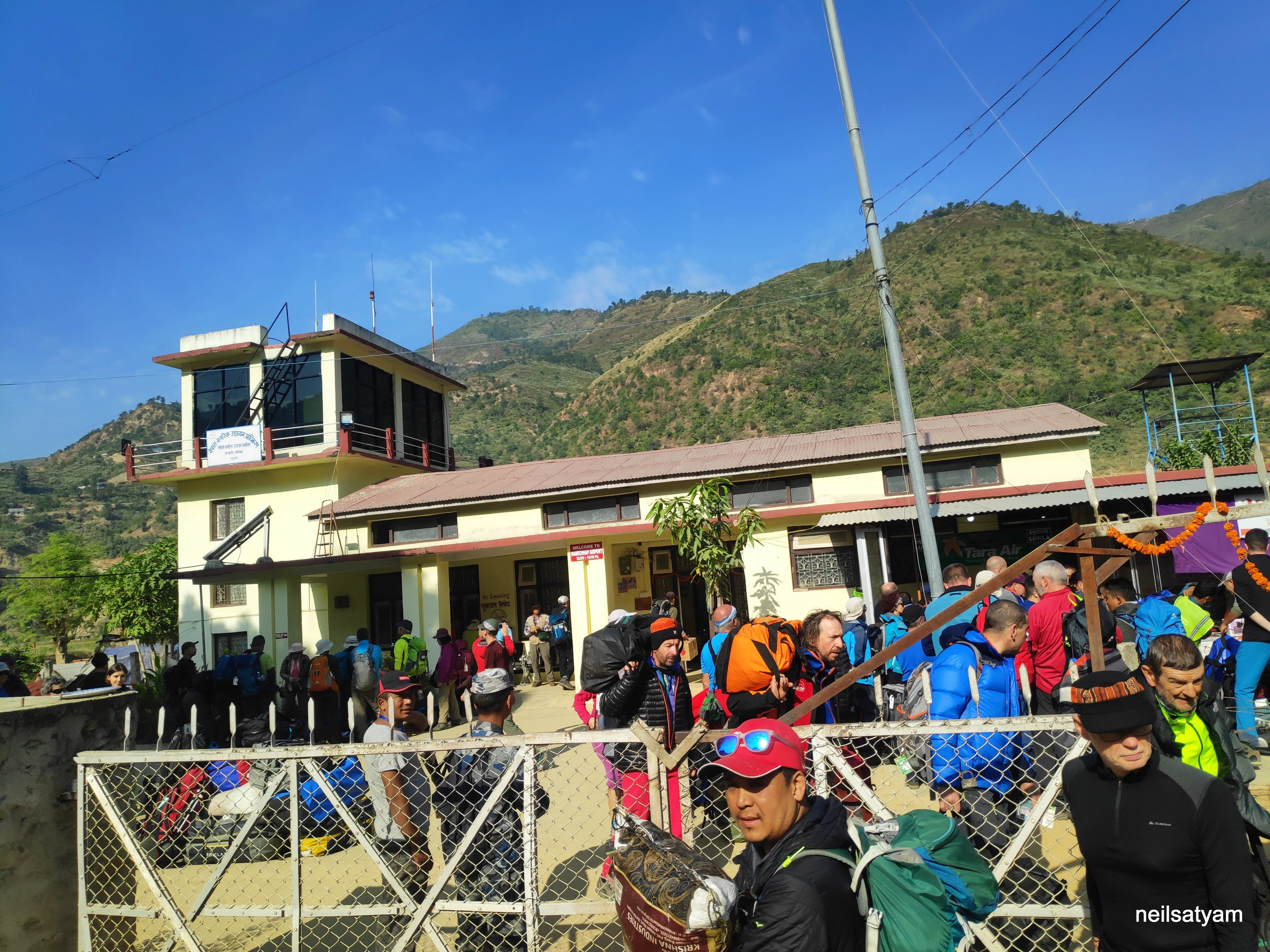
Crowded entrance of Manthali airport.

Manthali, Ramechhap Airport in 2026

== Airlines and destinations ==
Airlines	Destinations
Sita Air	Lukla; Charter: Kathmandu, Phaplu
Summit Air	Lukla; Charter: Phaplu
Tara Air	Lukla; Charter: Phaplu

== Access ==
The airport is located near Feeder Road 32. It is connected to Kathmandu via BP Highway.

== Incidents and accidents ==
- 22 April 2019 – A Tara Air Dornier 228 aircraft skidded off the runway upon landing at Ramechhap Airport. Due to adverse weather, the flight from Tribhuvan International Airport to Lukla Airport was diverted to Ramechhap Airport. All of the crew and passengers evacuated the aircraft safely.
- 20 March 2020 – A Summit Air Let 410 en route from Lukla to Kathmandu made an emergency landing at Ramechhap Airport due to an engine failure. All of the crew and passengers evacuated the aircraft safely.

== See also ==
List of airports in Nepal
