= Okhreni =

Okhreni ओख्रेनी
- Village development committee
- Location in Nepal
- Coordinates: 27.31°N 86.15°E
- Country: Nepal
- Zone: Janakpur Zone
- District: Ramechhap District

Population (1991)
  - Total: 3,007
- Time zone: UTC+5:45 (Nepal Time)

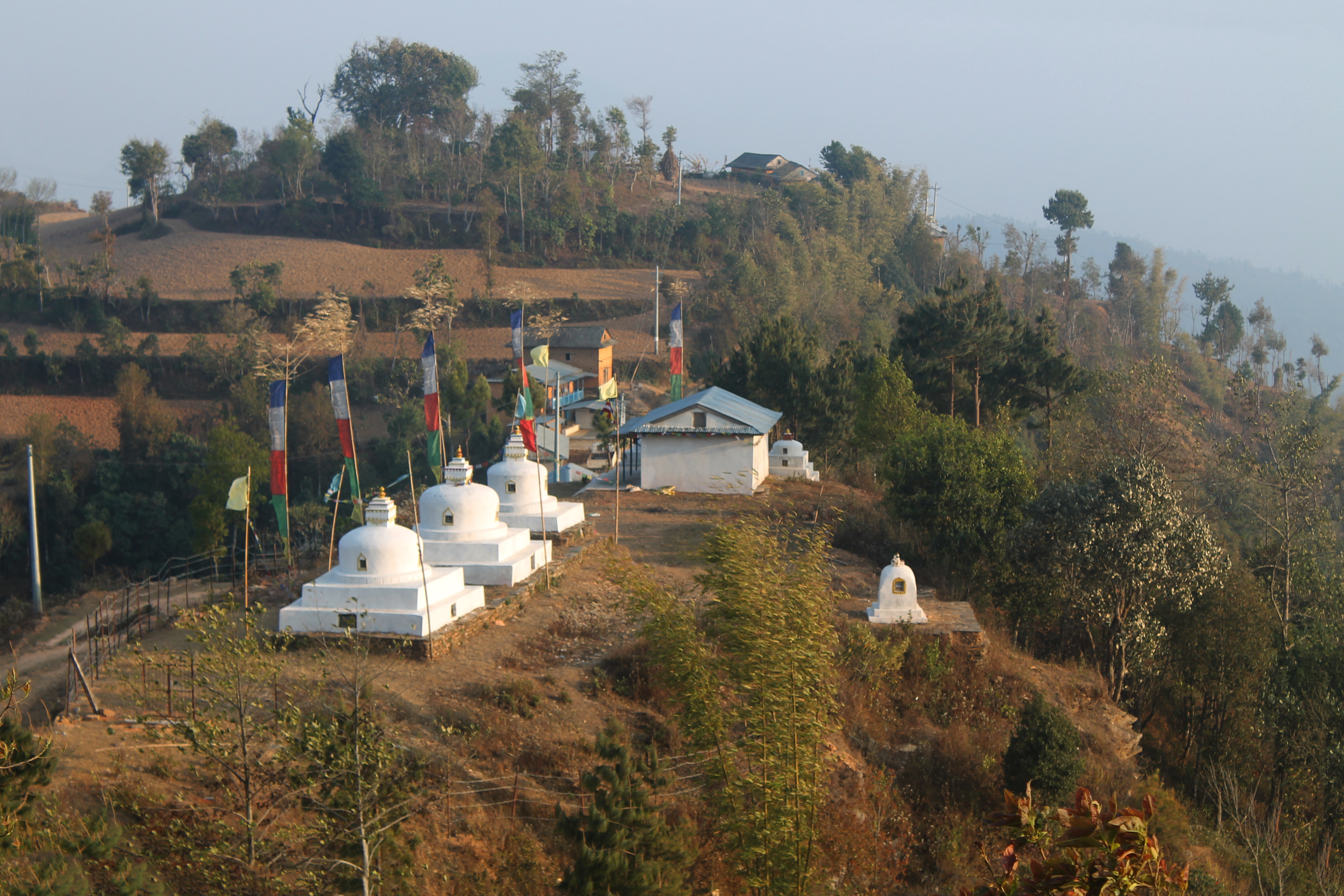
Chyasku Bhanjyang, Okhreni

Okhreni was a village development committee in Ramechhap District in the Janakpur Zone of north-eastern Nepal now it has included on Ramechhap municipality. At the time of the 1991 Nepal census it had a population of 3,007 people living in 549 individual households.
