= Lukla =

Town in Koshi Province, Nepal

- Town
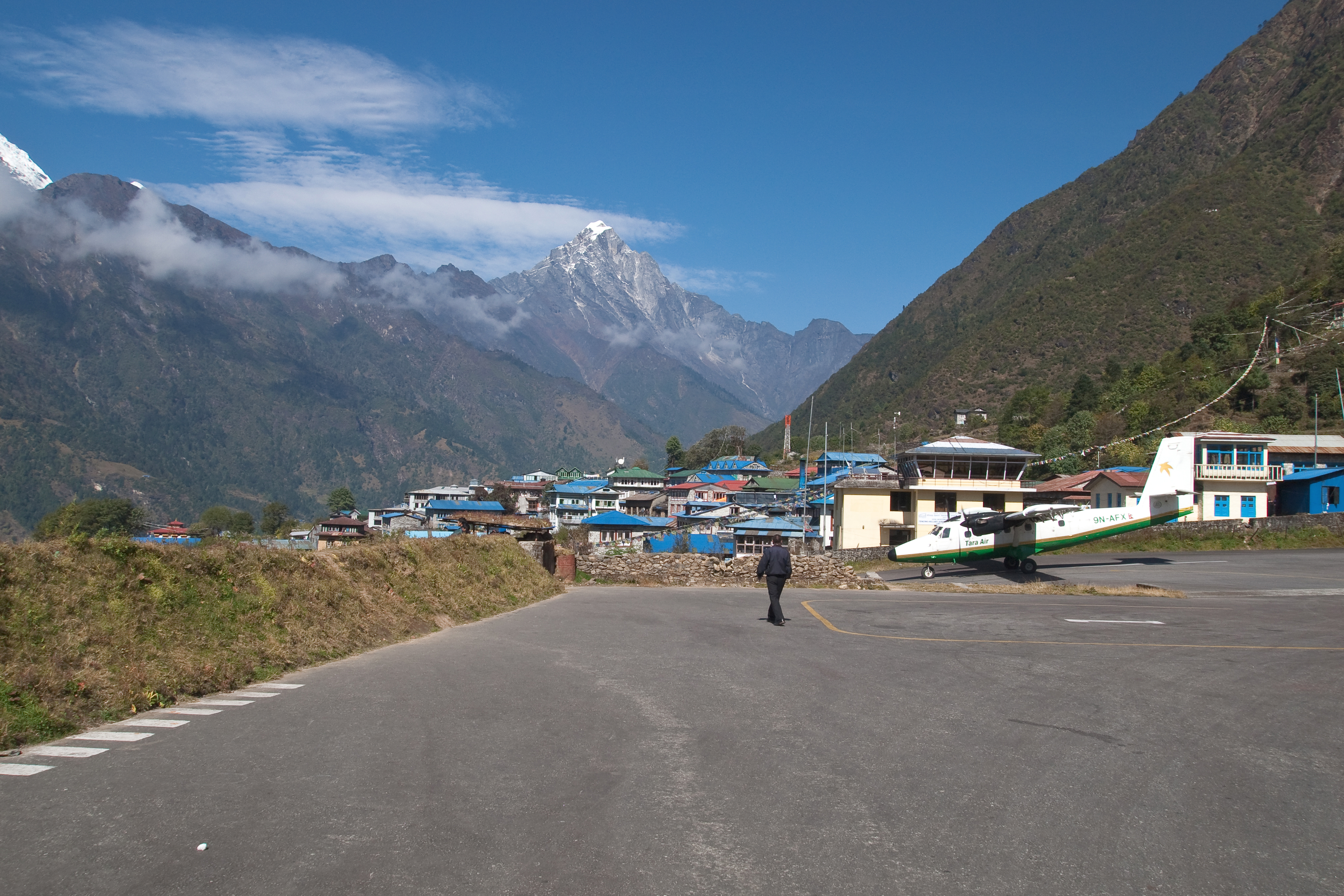
- Looking across the township of Lukla, with the air strip of Lukla Airport in the foreground and the mountain Nupla in the background

- Location in Nepal Lukla (Nepal)
- Coordinates: 27°41′20″N 86°43′50″E
- Country: Nepal
- Province: Province No. 1
- District: Solukhumbu District
- Rural municipality: Khumbu Pasanglhamu

Government
  - Type: Ward division
- Elevation: 2,860 m (9,380 ft)
- Time zone: UTC+5:45 (Nepal Time)
- Postal code: 56010
- Area code: 038

Lukla (Nepali: लुक्ला Nepali pronunciation: [ˈlukla]) is a small town in the Khumbu Pasang Lhamu rural municipality of the Solukhumbu District in the Koshi Province of northeastern Nepal. Situated at 2,860 metres (9,383 ft) above sea level, it is a popular place for visitors to the Himalayas near Mount Everest to arrive. Although Lukla means "place with many goats and sheep", few of them are found in the area now.

Lukla village holds a small airport serving the region, and a variety of shops and lodges catering to tourists and trekkers, providing western-style meals and trail supplies. From Lukla, travelers need two days to reach the village of Namche Bazaar, an altitude-acclimatization stop for those continuing on. The airport has a 527-metre (1,729 ft) single asphalt runway.

In August 2014, the Nepalese government announced plans to open the first tarmac road from Kathmandu to Lukla.

== Airport ==
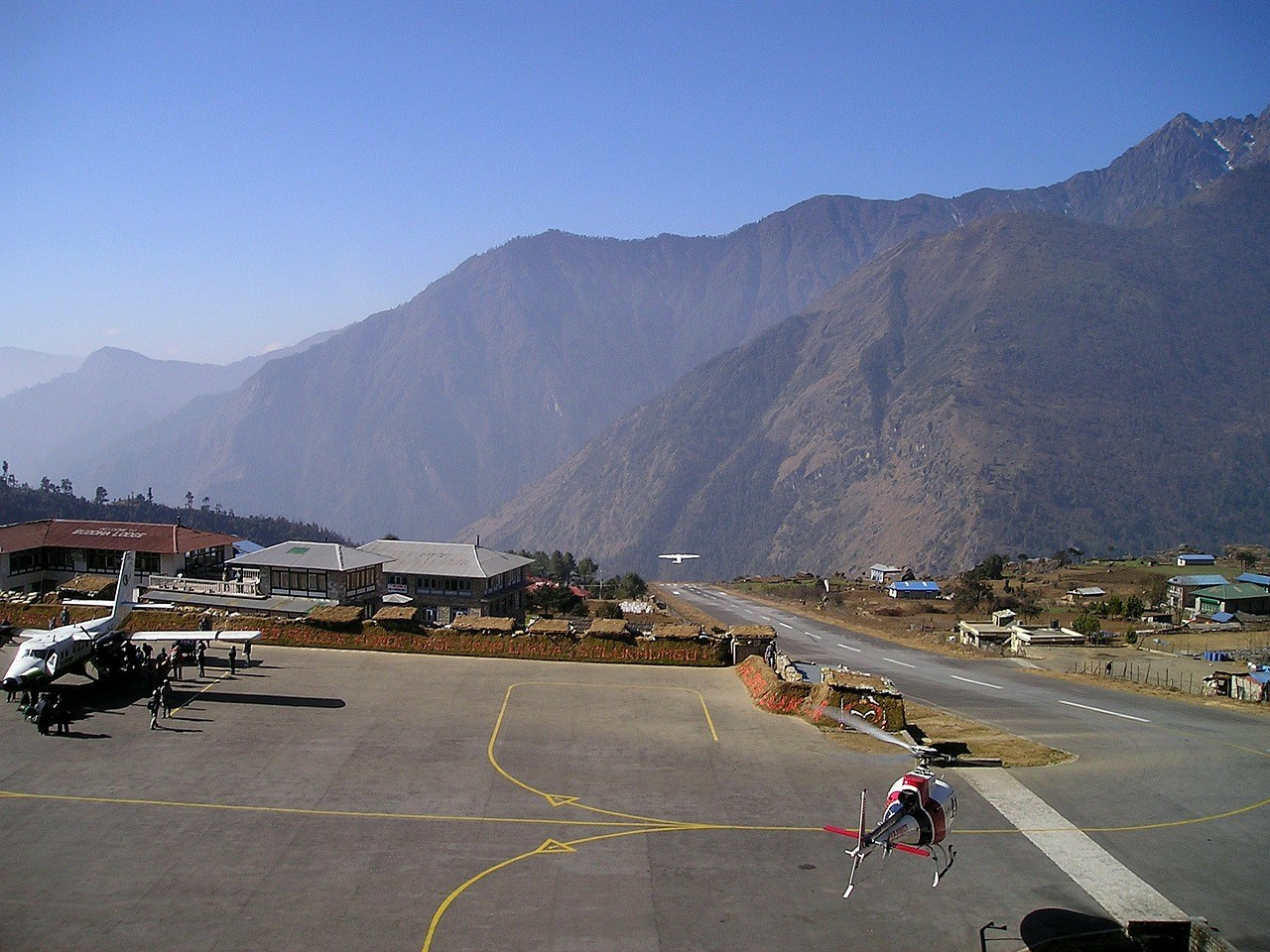
One of the scariest and most dangerous landings in the world at Lukla Airport in Nepal

Lukla is served by the Tenzing-Hillary Airport. Weather permitting, twin-engine Dornier 228s and de Havilland Canada Twin Otters make frequent daylight flights between Lukla and Kathmandu. Lukla Airport has a very short and steep airstrip, often compounded by hazardous weather, resulting in several fatal accidents. It has been called the most dangerous airport in the world.

== Climate ==
Lukla has a subtropical highland climate (Köppen Cwb).

Climate data for Lukla (Tenzing-Hillary Airport), elevation 2,786 m (9,140 ft), (1991–2020 normals)
Month	Jan	Feb	Mar	Apr	May	Jun	Jul	Aug	Sep	Oct	Nov	Dec	Year
Mean daily maximum °C (°F)	8.3 (46.9)	8.9 (48.0)	13.3 (55.9)	16.6 (61.9)	16.7 (62.1)	17.7 (63.9)	18.4 (65.1)	18.6 (65.5)	18.6 (65.5)	16.8 (62.2)	13.8 (56.8)	11.1 (52.0)	14.9 (58.8)
Daily mean °C (°F)	2.7 (36.9)	3.7 (38.7)	8.0 (46.4)	11.2 (52.2)	12.4 (54.3)	15.0 (59.0)	15.8 (60.4)	15.8 (60.4)	15.1 (59.2)	12.1 (53.8)	8.1 (46.6)	5.3 (41.5)	10.4 (50.8)
Mean daily minimum °C (°F)	−2.9 (26.8)	−1.6 (29.1)	2.6 (36.7)	5.7 (42.3)	8.0 (46.4)	12.3 (54.1)	13.2 (55.8)	12.9 (55.2)	11.6 (52.9)	7.4 (45.3)	2.4 (36.3)	−0.5 (31.1)	5.9 (42.7)
Average precipitation mm (inches)	15.3 (0.60)	17.2 (0.68)	45.3 (1.78)	58.7 (2.31)	127.6 (5.02)	324.8 (12.79)	529.8 (20.86)	641.8 (25.27)	419.0 (16.50)	102.9 (4.05)	6.2 (0.24)	0.5 (0.02)	2,289.1 (90.12)
Source: Department of Hydrology and Meteorology
