= 2005 New Year Honours =

British royal recognitions

The New Year Honours 2005 were appointments by some of the Commonwealth realms to various orders and honours to recognise and reward good works by citizens of those countries. The New Year Honours are awarded as part of the New Year celebrations at the start of January.

New Year Honours were granted in the United Kingdom and New Zealand at the start of 2005. Among these in the UK were knighthoods conferred on Mike Tomlinson, the educationalist; Derek Wanless, who led a review of the National Health Service; and Brian Harrison, editor of the Oxford Dictionary of National Biography. The former athlete Kelly Holmes was made a Dame. The television presenter Alan Whicker was appointed a CBE.

The recipients of honours are displayed as they were styled before their new honours and arranged by the country (in order of precedence) whose ministers advised The Queen on the appointments, then by honour with grades i.e. Knight/Dame Grand Cross, Knight/Dame Commander etc. and then divisions i.e. Military and Civil, as appropriate.

== United Kingdom ==
=== Knights Bachelor ===
- Clive John Bourne, J.P. For services to Charity and to Education.
- Professor Robert Rees Davies, C.B.E., lately Chichele Professor of Medieval History, University of Oxford. For services to History.
- Robert Gerard Finch, lately Lord Mayor of London. For services to the City of London.
- Professor Andrew Paul Haines, Dean, London School of Hygiene and Tropical Medicine. For services to Medicine.
- Professor Brian Howard Harrison, lately Editor, Oxford Dictionary of National Biography.
- Alan Jeffrey Jones, Chair, Toyota Motor Manufacturing (UK) Ltd. For services to the Automotive Industry.
- Digby Marritt Jones, Director General, Confederation of British Industry. For services to Business.
- Roger Spencer Jones, O.B.E. For services to Business and Training in Wales.
- Robert Walter Kerslake, Chief Executive, Sheffield City Council. For services to Local Government.
- Professor John Hartley Lawton, C.B.E., F.R.S., Chief Executive, Natural Environment Research Council. For services to Ecological Science.
- Dr. Jonathan Michael, Chief Executive, Guy's and St Thomas' NHS Foundation Trust. For services to the National Health Service.
- Dr. Peter James Ogden, Founder of the Ogden Trust. For services to Education.
- Mervyn Kay Pedelty, lately Chief Executive, Co-operative Financial Services. For services to Business and to Charity.
- Matthew Clive Pinsent, C.B.E., Rower. For services to Sport.
- Professor Desmond Rea, O.B.E., Chair, Northern Ireland Policing Board. For services to the Police.
- Richard John Staite, O.B.E., Headteacher, Beeslack Community High School, Penicuik, Midlothian. For services to Education.
- Michael John Tomlinson, C.B.E., Chair, A-level Standards Inquiry, Working Group on 14–19 Reform and the Learning Trust for Hackney Schools. For services to Education.
- Professor James Cressee Elphinstone Underwood, Professor, Royal College of Pathologists and Professor of Pathology at the University of Sheffield. For services to Medicine.
- David Veness, C.B.E., Q.P.M., Assistant Commissioner, Metropolitan Police Service. For services to the Police.
- John Stuart Vickers, Chair and Chief Executive, Office of Fair Trading. For public service.
- Derek Wanless. For public service.

Diplomatic Service and Overseas List

- Mark John Spurgeon Allen, C.M.G., counsellor at the Foreign and Commonwealth Office.
- Professor Clive William John Granger. For services to Economics.
- Professor Basil Spyridonos Markesinis, Q.C., F.B.A. For services to international legal relations.

=== Order of the Bath ===
==== Knights Grand Cross of the Order of the Bath (G.C.B.) ====
Military Division

Army

- General Sir Michael David Jackson, K.C.B., C.B.E., D.S.O., A.D.C. Gen (475176), late The Parachute Regiment.

==== Knights Commander of the Order of the Bath (K.C.B.) ====
Military Division

Army

- Lieutenant-General (Local General) Kevin O'Donaghue, C.B.E. (486538), late Corps of Royal Engineers.

Royal Air Force

- Air Marshal Glenn Lester Torpy, C.B.E., D.S.O., Royal Air Force.

Civil Division

- (Edward) John Watson Gieve, C.B., Permanent Secretary at the Home Office.
- David John Normington, C.B., Permanent Secretary at the Department for Education and Skills.

==== Companions of the Order of the Bath (C.B.) ====
Military Division

Royal Navy

- Rear-Admiral Peter Roland Davies, C.B.E.
- Rear-Admiral Niall Stuart Roderick Kilgour.

Army

- Major-General Jonathan Bernard Appleton Bailey, M.B.E. (494267), late Royal Regiment of Artillery.
- Major-General Michael Huntley (494362), late Corps of Royal Electrical and Mechanical Engineers.
- Lieutenant-General Anthony Malcolm Douglas Palmer, C.B.E. (487557), late The Royal Green Jackets.

Royal Air Force

- Air Vice-Marshal James Andrew Collier, C.B.E., Royal Air Force.
- Air Vice-Marshal Peter Brett Walker, C.B.E., Royal Air Force.

Civil Division

- Mark Eric Addison, director-general of operations and service delivery at the Department for the Environment, Food and Rural Affairs.
- Colin McLauchlan Baxter, lately head of the Police and Community Safety Group in the Justice Department of the Scottish Executive.
- David Brummell, legal secretary to the Law Officers of the Office of the Attorney General.
- John David Coles, chief executive of the Warship Support Agency.
- Naomi Eisenstadt, director of Sure Start, Department for Education and Skills.
- Mark Gibson, director-general of the business group, Department of Trade and Industry.
- John Francis Gilhooly, chief executive of the Office of the Parliamentary Counsel.
- Brian Leslie Glicksman, treasury officer of accounts at HM Treasury.
- Robin Paul Halward, lately deputy director-general of the Immigration and Nationality Directorate, Home Office.
- David Seymour, Legal Adviser to the Home Office and the Northern Ireland Office.
- Douglas Armitage Smith, lately chief executive of the Child Support Agency.
- George Macaulay Trevelyan, lately director of the delivery strategy team, Defra.
- Marjorie Williams, director of local services, Inland Revenue.

=== Order of St Michael and St George ===
==== Knights Commander of the Order of St Michael and St George (K.C.M.G.) ====
Diplomatic Division

- Edward Clay, British High Commissioner, Nairobi.
- Robert John Coleman, lately director-general of health and consumer protection, European Commission.
- John Douglas Kelso Grant, UK Permanent Representative to the European Union.

==== Companions of the Order of St Michael and St George (C.M.G.) ====
Civil Division

- Elizabeth Kerr Burns, O.B.E., president of the International Association of Volunteer Effort. For services to Volunteering.
- Stuart John Doughty, chief executive of Costain Group plc. For services to International Trade and Investment.
- John Charles Odling-Smee, lately director of the European II Department of the International Monetary Fund. For services to International Finance.

Diplomatic Division

- Dr Robin William Baker, deputy director-general of the British Council.
- John Cummins, M.B.E., lately counsellor and HM Consul-General in Moscow.
- Paul Stephen Dimond, HM Ambassador to the Philippines.
- Major-General Robert Duncan Seaton Gordon, C.B.E. (490208), late 17th/21st Lancers.
- Allan Graham Gormly, C.B.E. For services to the Foreign and Commonwealth Office Board of Management.
- David John Gowan, HM Ambassador to Serbia and Montenegro.
- Alison Mariot Leslie, HM Ambassador to Norway.
- Philip Raymond Nelson, counsellor at the Foreign and Commonwealth Office.
- William Charters Patey, HM Ambassador to Sudan.
- Angela Joy Williams, lately director of the United Nations Relief and Works Agency for Palestine Refugees in the Near East.

=== Royal Victorian Order ===
==== Commanders of the Royal Victorian Order (C.V.O.) ====
- Dr Claude Blair, O.B.E. For services to the Royal Collection.
- Edward Peter Demery, Clerk of the Royal Cellars.
- Major-General Geoffrey William Field, C.B., O.B.E., resident governor and Keeper of the Jewel House in the Tower of London.
- Vice-Admiral Michael Peter Gretton, C.B., director of The Duke of Edinburgh's Award (UK).
- Brigadier Colin John McCrae Harrisson, O.B.E., formerly chief executive of King Edward VII's Hospital (Sister Agnes)
- Major-General David Houston, C.B.E., formerly Lord Lieutenant of Sutherland.
- Lieutenant-General Sir Maurice Robert Johnston, K.C.B., O.B.E., formerly Lord Lieutenant of Wiltshire.
- Graeme Neil Munro, formerly director and chief executive of Historic Scotland.
- Surgeon Captain David Leslie Swain, L.V.O., R.N., Medical Officer to The Queen abroad.

==== Lieutenants of the Royal Victorian Order (L.V.O.) ====
- Philip Metcalf Bolam, honorary press officer of Royal Agricultural Society of the Commonwealth.
- Elizabeth Faith Currer Buchanan, deputy private secretary to The Prince of Wales.
- Lieutenant-Colonel Robert Guy Cartwright, secretary of the Central Chancery of the Orders of Knighthood.
- Nicholas John Lucas Chance, J.P., private secretary to Prince and Princess Michael of Kent.
- Nigel John Fordham, formerly head of the Crown Agents Stamp Bureau.
- The Reverend Charles Robertson, Minister of Canongate Kirk.
- Constance Margaret Tyler, formerly assistant fundraising director of the Duke of Edinburgh's Award (UK).
- Dr Peter Wheeler, Apothecary to The Prince of Wales.

==== Members of the Royal Victorian Order (M.V.O.) ====
- Gregory Peter Jerome Begley, formerly Accountant, Crown Estate Office, Windsor.
- Sergeant Douglas Davies Birnie, Metropolitan Police. For services to Royalty Protection.
- David Charles Curtis, Land Steward, Eastern Counties, Duchy of Cornwall.
- Sergeant Benjamin Lionel Dady, Metropolitan Police. For services to Royalty Protection.
- Charles Ian Paul Denyer, Clerk of the Chamber and Head of the Crown Office in Chancery.
- Andrew Francis Farquharson, Assistant to the Master of the Household, F Branch, Royal Household.
- Rupert David Featherstone, Senior Paintings, Conservator, Royal Collection.
- Inspector David Paul Fuller, Metropolitan Police. For services to Royalty Protection.
- Patrick John Garratt, formerly Gardening Supervisor, Government House, Canberra.
- Miss Bettina Marie Helen Gonsalves, formerly Fundraising Executive, The Duke of Edinburgh’s Award (UK).
- Ronald Clifford Harper, Deputy Property Manager, Buckingham Palace and St. James’s Palace.
- Stephen Howe, Chief Operating Officer, Outward Bound.
- Miss Sarah-Jane Lavington. For services to the late Princess Alice, Duchess of Gloucester.
- Norman Henry Pattenden, M.B.E., formerly Royal Train Officer, English, Welsh and Scottish Railways.
- Miss Linda Hazel Saunders, Deputy Housekeeper, Buckingham Palace.
- Alec Tompson, formerly Land Agent, Gatcombe Park.

==== Bar to the Royal Victorian Medal (Silver) ====
- Ivan Richard Boggis, R.V.M., Tractor Driver, Sandringham Estate.
- Ronald James Forsyth, R.V.M., Palace Attendant, Windsor Castle.

==== Royal Victorian Medal (Silver) ====
- Anthony Lawrence Ambrose, Craft Welder, Crown Estate, Windsor.
- David William Bradshaw, Forestry Department Worker, Sandringham Estate.
- Paul Robert Chettle, Palace Attendant, Buckingham Palace.
- Eric Hanchett, formerly Gardener, Gatcombe Estate.
- Terence Charles Holdforth, House Manager and Butler, Sunninghill Park.
- Andrew Charles Napier, Polisher, C Branch, Royal Household.
- Divisional Sergeant Major Lincoln Frederick Harry Perkins, B.E.M., The Queen’s Body Guard of the Yeomen of the Guard.
- Keith Aran Rembridge, Court Post Office, Buckingham Palace.
- Henry John Rudd, Stud Hand, Wolferton Stud.
- Brian Searle, Gardens Fitter, Hampton Court Palace.
- Alexander Milne Taylor, Mason, Balmoral Estate.
- Gary Michael Wilson, Chief Gilder, C Branch, Windsor Castle.
- Martin Woods, Head Gardener, Sandringham Estate.

== Order of the British Empire ==
=== Knights and Dames Grand Cross of the Order of the British Empire (GBE) ===
==== Civilian Division ====
- The Rt Hon Dame (Ann) Elizabeth (Oldfield) Butler-Sloss, DBE, president of the Family Division of the High Court of Justice.
- Sir Bryan Hubert Nicholson, chair, Financial Reporting Council. For public service.

=== Dames Commander of the Order of the British Empire (DBE) ===
==== Civilian Division ====
- Miss Kelly Holmes, MBE, For services to Athletics.
- Mrs Mary Beaton MacDonald, headteacher, Riverside Primary School, North Shields, North Tyneside. For services to Education.
- The Rev Sarah Elisabeth Mullally, formerly chief nursing officer, Department of Health.
- Dr Gillian Mary Pugh, OBE, chief executive, Coram Family. For services to Children and their Families.
- Professor Jean Olwen Thomas, CBE, FRS, Professor of Macromolecular Biochemistry, University of Cambridge. For services to Biochemistry.
- Mrs Tanni Carys Davina Grey-Thompson, OBE, For services to Disabled Sport.
- Dr Fanny Waterman, CBE, chair and artistic director, Leeds International Pianoforte Competition. For services to Music.

==== Diplomatic Service and Overseas ====
- Jillian Lesley, Mrs. Sackler. For services to the promotion of the arts and sciences.

=== Commanders of the Order of the British Empire (CBE) ===
==== Military Division ====
Royal Navy

- Commodore James Rupert Fanshawe, Royal Navy.
- Captain (now Commodore) Peter Derek Hudson, Royal Navy.
- Commodore Christopher Anthony James Silcock, Royal Navy.

Army

- Colonel Richard Peter Meredith Austin (471191), late Adjutant General's Corps (Army Legal Services Branch).
- Brigadier David Charles Kirk, M.B.E. (505287), late The Royal Highland Fusiliers.
- Brigadier Robert Lamont Kirkland, O.B.E. (501627), late The Green Howards.
- Colonel Robert James Morrison, O.B.E. (493056), late The Royal Logistic Corps.
- Brigadier Richard Rook, O.B.E., A.D.C. (489593), late Royal Logistic Corps.

Royal Air Force

- Group Captain Brian Lawrence Bates, Royal Air Force.
- Group Captain Stephen John Hillier, DFC, Royal Air Force.
- Air Commodore Nigel Williams, Royal Air Force.

==== Civilian Division ====
- Roy Kenneth Alder, Director, Executive Support, Medicines and Healthcare Products Regulatory Agency.
- John Murray Allan, Chief Executive, Exel and President, Freight Transport Association. For services to Freight Transport.
- Colin Herbert Baker, General Secretary, National Federation of Subpostmasters. For services to the Post Office.
- Mrs Mair Barnes. For services to the Retail Sector and to Business.
- Ms Carol Vanessa Bernard, Chief Officer, Northamptonshire Probation Area. For services to the National Probation Service.
- Richard David (Sandy) Blair, lately Director, Welsh Local Government Association. For services to Local Government.
- Professor Quentin Saxby Blake, OBE, Illustrator. For services to Children's Literature.
- Professor Senga Bond, Professor of Nursing Research and Head, School of Population and Health Sciences, University of Newcastle-upon-Tyne. For services to Nursing.
- Steven Richard Bowker, lately Chairman and Chief Executive, Strategic Rail Authority. For services to the Rail Industry.
- Stewart Craufurd Boyd, QC, Deputy Chair, Financial Services Authority. For services to the Finance Sector.
- Peter Richard Bradley, Chief Executive, London Ambulance Service NHS Trust. For services to the NHS.
- Dr Robert Keith Bramley, lately Chief Scientist, Forensic Science Service, Home Office.
- Gerard Anthony Brown, Solicitor Advocate. For services to the Justice System in Scotland.
- Professor John Boscawen Burland, FRS, Emeritus Professor of Soil Mechanics, Imperial College, London. For services to Geotechnical Engineering.
- Maxwell Marshall Caller, chief executive, London Borough of Hackney. For services to Local Government.
- John Charles Clare, Chief Executive, Dixons. For services to the National Employment Panel and to Business.
- Mrs Mary Clarke, Director of Nursing, City and Hackney Teaching Primary Care Trust. For services to Nursing.
- Professor Roger Howard Clarke, Chairman, International Commission on Radiological Protection.
- Graham Nigel Cole, Director, Government Affairs, GKN plc. For services to the Aerospace Industry.
- Richard Charles Cooke, Regional Director, Northern England, Inland Revenue.
- Dr John Philip Cornish, lately Head, Building Control Division, Development Department, Scottish Executive.
- Mrs Jill Vivienne Kelsall Coughlan, Headteacher, Elizabeth Garrett Anderson School, Islington, London. For services to Education.
- Andrew Cozens, lately President, Association of Directors of Social Services. For services to Social Work.
- Roger Creedon, Chief Executive, Electoral Commission. For services to Elections.
- Stephen Colin Cuthbert, Chief Executive, Port of London Authority and chair, UK Major Ports Group. For services to the Ports Industry.
- Roger Harry Daltrey. For services to Music, the Entertainment Industry, and to charity.
- Antonio Denunzio, President and Chief Executive Officer, ASDA. For services to the Retail Industry.
- Professor Dian Donnai, Professor of Medical Genetics, University of Manchester and Clinical director, North West Genetics Service. For services to Medicine.
- Ms Helen Dudley, Director, Human Resources, Department for Constitutional Affairs.
- Professor William Dunlop, lately President, Royal College of Obstetricians and Gynaecologists. For services to Medicine.
- Robin Arthur Philip Duval, lately Director, British Board of Film Classification. For services to the Film Industry.
- Paul Fletcher Everall, Head, Building Division, Office of the Deputy Prime Minister.
- David James Fillingham, lately Director, NHS Modernisation Agency. For services to the NHS.
- Professor John Garside, lately Principal and Vice-Chancellor, University of Manchester Institute of Science and Technology. For services to Higher Education.
- Simon James Holliday Gray, Writer. For services to Drama and Literature.
- Patrick John Spear Griggs, lately President, Chair, Comite ́ Maritime International. For services to the Maritime Industry.
- Peter Michael Roland Handcock, Chief Executive, Tribunals Service, Department for Constitutional Affairs.
- Dr Anthony George Harris, OBE, Chair, West Midlands Rural Affairs Forum. For services to Agriculture and to the Environment.
- John Eric Harris, MBE, Chair, Alba plc. For services to Business and to Charity.
- Dr Frederic Roger Heathcote, Chief Executive, Employment Tribunals Service.
- Michael Irving Ian Hedges, QPM, lately Chief Constable, South Yorkshire Police. For services to the Police.
- Philip David Hedley, lately Artistic Director and Chief Executive, Theatre Royal, Stratford East, London. For services to Drama.
- Professor Anthony John Grenville Hey, Professor of Computation, University of Southampton and director, UK e-Science Programme. For services to Science.
- Patrick Holden, Director, Soil Association. For services to Organic Farming.
- Peter Holland, DL, Vice-Chair, Association of Police Authorities. For services to the Police.
- Jonathan Wilson Hoyle, Senior Civil Servant, Ministry of Defence.
- Christopher John Hughes, lately Chief Executive, Learning and Skills Development Agency. For services to Education and Training.
- Professor Susan Diana Iversen, Pro-Vice Chancellor, University of Oxford. For services to Higher Education and to Science.
- Professor Lisa Jardine, Professor of Renaissance Studies, Queen Mary, University of London. For services to Education.
- Sylvia, Lady Jay, Director General, Food and Drink Federation. For services to the Food and Drink Industries.
- Lawrence Edward Johnson, lately Managing Director, General Dynamics UK Ltd. For services to the Defence Industry.
- Dr Richard Parry-Jones, Group Vice-President, Global Product Development and Chief Technical Officer, Ford Motor Company. For services to the Automobile Industry.
- Richard Edward Kellaway, Director General, Commonwealth War Graves Commission.
- Mrs Alison Lindsay King, Leader, Norfolk County Council. For services to Local Government.
- Dr Pauleen Alice Lane. For services to Local Government.
- Mrs Anne Shirley Lucas Lapping, Television Producer. For services to Broadcasting.
- Brian Michael Lapping, Television Producer. For services to Broadcasting.
- Peter Lederer, OBE, Chair, Visitscotland. For services to Tourism.
- Christopher John Lendrum, lately Vice Chair, Barclays Bank plc. For services to Banking.
- John Richard Lill, OBE, Pianist. For services to Music.
- Alan Lovell, Senior Civil Servant, Ministry of Defence.
- Ms Anna Raymond Massey, Actress. For services to Drama.
- Cresson Vivian McIver, Assistant Chief Inspector, Education and Training Inspectorate, Department of Education, Northern Ireland.
- Keith Manson Miller, Chief Executive, The Miller Group. For services to the Construction Industry in Scotland and to Charity.
- Ms Gloria Helenly Mills, MBE, Director of Equal Opportunities, Unison. For services to Equal Opportunities.
- Denis Mulkerrin, Headteacher, Gordon's School, Woking, Surrey. For services to Education.
- Professor Christopher Paul Mullard, Member, Campaign against Racial Discrimination. For services to Race Relations.
- Thomas Michael Napier. For services to the Law and to Pro Bono Legal Work.
- Maurice Raymond Newey, lately Chief Executive, Vehicle and Operator Services Agency.
- Walter Anthony Payne, Chief Executive, Federation of Licensed Victuallers Association. For services to the Licensing Trade.
- Frank Pignatelli, Chief Executive, Scottish University for Industry. For services to Education and Lifelong Learning.
- Professor Robert Arthur Pinker, Privacy Commissioner, Press Complaints Commission. For public service.
- Alan Frederick Plater, Writer and Playwright. For services to Drama.
- Sister Bernadette Mary Porter, lately Rector and Chief Executive, Roehampton University of Surrey. For services to Higher Education.
- Geoffrey Colin Powell, OBE. For services to Financial Regulation and to the community in Jersey.
- Professor Judith Anne Rees, Deputy Director and Professor of Environmental and Resources Management, London School of Economics and Political Science. For services to Social Science.
- Mrs Susan Ilene Rice, Chief Executive, Lloyds TSB Scotland. For services to Banking.
- David Richards, Director, Prodrive. For services to Motor Sport.
- Professor Donald Andrew Ritchie, DL, Emeritus Professor of Genetics, University of Liverpool and deputy chairman, Environment Agency. For services to the Environment and to Science.
- Terence James Rose, Director Wales and South West, Health and Safety Executive.
- Timothy David Melville-Ross, Chair, Investors in People UK. For services to Workplace Learning and Development.
- Graeme David Rowe, Head, International Shipping Policy Division, Department for Transport.
- Michael James Ryan, Vice-President and General Manager, Short Bros plc. For services to Business in Northern Ireland.
- Dr Michael Shooter, Consultant Child Psychiatrist. For services to the NHS in Wales.
- Neville Shulman, OBE, Charity Fundraising Explorer and Mountaineer and chairman of the George Thomas Educational Trust. For charitable services.
- Thomas Frederick Stainer, Chief Agricultural Economist, Director of Policy and Economics Division, Department of Agriculture and Rural Development, Northern Ireland Executive.
- Eric Sykes, OBE, Actor. For services to Drama.
- Dr Wendy Thomson, Head, Office of Public Service Reform, Cabinet Office.
- Professor Cheryll Anne Tickle, FRS, FRSE, Foulerton Royal Society Professor, University of Dundee and Member, Biotechnology and Biological Sciences Research Council. For services to Biology.
- Douglas Tweddle, Director, Regional Business Services, HM Customs and Excise.
- Anu Kiran Vedi, Group Chief Executive, Genesis Housing Group. For services to Housing.
- Ms Pamela Janice Warhurst, Deputy-Chair, Countryside Agency. For services to the Environment.
- John Merlin Waterson, lately Historic Properties Director, National Trust. For services to Heritage.
- Barry Nicholas Aubrey Weatherill, Chair, Guide Dogs for the Blind Association. For services to Blind People.
- Alan Donald Whicker, Author and Broadcaster. For services to Broadcasting.
- Peter Whittaker, lately Headteacher, Hall Green School, Birmingham. For services to Education.
- Professor Patricia Mang Ming Woo, Professor of Paediatric Rheumatology, University College, London. For services to Medicine.
- Donald Wood, Chief Executive, London and Quadrant Housing Trust. For services to Social Housing.

==== Diplomatic Service and Overseas ====
- Mohamed Iqbal Asaria. For services to international development.
- Ian Miller Bill. For services to British business interest in the oil and gas sector.
- Dr. Colin Michael Foale. For services to space exploration.
- Alfred Kane, president, Glencree Centre for Reconciliation, Ireland.
- Melvyn Edgar Angus Lockie, counsellor, Foreign and Commonwealth Office.
- Charles Adam Edward Pollock. For services to opera and UK-Italian cultural relations.
- Dr. Alan Edward Smith. For services to biotechnology research and to British trade development in the USA.
- Jonathan Francis Taylor. chairman, Marshall Aid Commemoration Commission. For services to UK-USA relations.
- Stephen Taylor. For services to civil engineering in the USA.

=== Officers of the Order of the British Empire (OBE) ===
==== Civil Division ====
- Professor Anne Lesley Abbott, Professor of Early Childhood Education, Manchester Metropolitan University. For services to Education.
- Nazir Afzal, Sector Director, Crown Prosecution Service.
- Dr. Kishori Gopal Agrawal, J.P., General Medical Practitioner, Sandwell, West Midlands. For services to Healthcare.
- Charles Benedict Ainslie, M.B.E., Yachtsman. For services to Sailing.
- Peter Maclaren Aitken, Senior Business Manager, H.M. Customs and Excise.
- George Henry Alcock, Honorary Consul (Northern England) for the Philippines. For services to the community in the North West.
- Maggi, Mrs. Allan, Executive Director, Education Resources, South Lanarkshire Council. For services to Education.
- Guy Reid-Bailey, Chair, United Housing Association. For services to Social Housing in the South West.
- Professor John Keith Banyard, Director, Asset Management, Severn Trent Water Ltd. For services to the Water Industry and to Engineering.
- Eric Malcolm Barnes, Non-Executive Director, Experian and Chairman, Nottingham Forest plc. For services to the community in the East Midlands.
- Dr. Hugh Wilson Taylor Barron, Lecturer, Department of Engineering, University of Aberdeen. For services to Road Accident Investigation.
- John Adrian Shepherd-Barron. Inventor of the Automatic Cash Dispenser. For services to Banking.
- Professor Simon Baumberg. For services to Science. Archibald Howard Beattie, Investment Manager, Department of Enterprise, Trade and Investment, Northern Ireland Executive.
- Miss Leanne Benjamin (Mrs. Round), Principal, Royal Ballet Company. For services to Dance.
- Celia Jane Isherwood Bennett, lately Director, British Meat Processors Association. For services to the Meat and Livestock Industries.
- Trevor Paul Benson, Managing Director, Precision Air Systems, Ultra Electronics. For services to the Defence Industry.
- Professor David Berridge, Professor of Child and Family Welfare, University of Luton. For services to Children.
- Dr. Kristine Beuret, Director, Social Research Associates. For services to disabled people.
- The Reverend Prebendary Richard Thomas Bewes, Rector, All Souls Church, Langham Place, London. For services to the Church of England.
- The Reverend Dr. Inderjit Bhogal, Methodist Minister. For services to Inter-faith Relations.
- Malcolm Hugh Bird, Director, Quality and Sustainable Development, GKN Driveline. For services to the Automotive Industry.
- Dr. Christopher Board, lately Chair, UK Committee for Cartography, British Cartographic Society. For services to Cartography.
- Professor Mark Haworth-Booth, lately Senior Curator of Photographs, Victoria and Albert Museum. For services to Museums.
- Michael Brace, Chair, British Paralympic Association. For services to Disabled Sport.
- Dr. Mervyn Edward Bramley, lately Flood Defence Development Manager, Environment Agency. For services to the Environment.
- Christopher Roger Etrick Brooke. For services to Medical Research and to the community in Hampshire.
- David Brown, Chief Executive, North Cornwall District Council. For services to Local Government.
- Professor Stephen Frederick Brown, Professor of Civil Engineering, University of Nottingham. For services to Road Engineering.
- Richard Henry Burbidge, Chair and Managing Director, Richard Burbidge Ltd. For services to Business and to the community in Oswestry, Shropshire.
- Professor Peter Sherwood Burge, Professor of Occupational Medicine, Institute of Occupational Medicine, University of Birmingham. For services to Medicine.
- Ms Frances Burns, Head, Development and Publication Unit, Department for International Development.
- Professor Sally Byng, Chief Executive, Connect—the communication disability network. For services to Speech and Language Therapy.
- Neil Carr, Executive Director of Nursing, South Staffordshire Health Care NHS Trust. For services to Nursing.
- David Edward John Carson, Head of Tourism Branch, Department of Enterprise, Trade and Investment, Northern Ireland Executive.
- David Alexander Carter, Grade 7, Health and Safety Executive.
- Raymond Bobby Carter, lately Chairman, English Schools Football Association and Chair, Games and Sports Division, Central Council for Physical Recreation. For services to Sport.
- Pamela Margaret, Mrs. Castle, Chair, Thames Environment Protection Advisory Committee and Chair, Business and Community Safety Forum. For services to the Environment.
- Michael Walter Charleston, Honorary Secretary, South West Rivers Association. For services to Salmon and Wildlife Conservation.
- Francis Anthony Charnock, lately Headteacher, Holy Cross Roman Catholic High School, Chorley, Lancashire. For services to Education.
- Brian Edwin Chesworth, J.P. For services to Business and to the community in Macclesfield, Cheshire.
- Michael Clark, Managing Director, International Fish Canners (Scotland). For services to the Food Industry.
- James Dudley Henderson Clarke, B.E.M., Chair, London Marathon. For services to Sport.
- John Edward Clarke. For services to the community in Coventry.
- Robert John Clifford, Grade 7, Coroners Unit, Home Office.
- Anthony Climpson, Tourism and Publicity Officer, New Forest District Council and Immediate Past President, Tourism Management Institute. For services to Local Government.
- Nigel Richard John Coleman, lately Group Valuation Officer, North London Valuation Office Agency, Inland Revenue.
- Margaret Elizabeth, Mrs. Cooke, Assistant Director of Finance, Patent Office.
- Raymond George Alfred Cooney, Actor, Writer, Director and Producer. For services to Drama.
- Lesley Jane, Mrs. Corbett, Headteacher, Carden Primary School, Brighton, East Sussex. For services to Education.
- Martin Couchman, Deputy Chief Executive, British Hospitality Association. For services to Hospitality.
- James Edward Cracknell, M.B.E., Rower. For services to Sport.
- James Douglas Craig, Managing Director, Craig Group Ltd. For services to Business and to the community in North East Scotland.
- Stephen Cranston, Chief Executive, The Arts Factory, Ferndale, Rhondda. For services to Lifelong Learning.
- Professor Dorothy Hanson Crawford, Robert Irvine Professor of Medical Microbiology, University of Edinburgh. For services to Higher Education and Science.
- Keith Crockford, Waterfront Engineering Executive, Fleet Support Ltd. For services to the Defence Industry.
- Geoffrey Alexander Daniels, Director, National Learning and Skills Council. For services to Further Education.
- Professor Richard Adrian Daugherty, lately Professor, Education Department, University of Wales Aberystwyth. For services to Education.
- John Hamilton Davies, Chair, Civil Service Appeal Board. For public service.
- Priscilla Elizabeth, Mrs. Davies, J.P., Regional Development Manager, INCLUDE. For services to Young People and to the community in Wales.
- Shirley Ann, Mrs. Davies, Deputy Director of Service, Inland Revenue.
- Ivan Davis. For political and public service.
- John Dennis, Joint Managing Director, John Dennis Coachbuilders. For services to the Firefighting Industry.
- John Joseph Devine, lately Journalist, Irish Independent. For services to Journalism.
- Professor Thomas Martin Devine, Glucksman Research Professor and Director, AHRB Centre for Irish and Scottish Studies, University of Aberdeen. For services to Scottish History.
- Dr. Stuart Dobson, Ecotoxicologist and Physiologist, Centre for Ecology and Hydrology, Monks Wood, Huntingdon. For services to Ecotoxicology.
- Professor Anna Felicja Dominiczak, Professor of Cardiovascular Medicine, BHF Glasgow Cardiovascular Research Centre, University of Glasgow. For services to Medicine.
- Professor Christopher Stephen Downes, Professor of Cancer Biology, University of Ulster. For services to Biomedical Research.
- Dr. John Richard Dudeney, Deputy Director, British Antarctic Survey. For services to Science.
- David Stanley Edwards, lately Chief Executive, Cardiff and Vale NHS Trust. For services to the NHS.
- Douglas Ellis. For services to Football and to the community in the West Midlands.
- Francis Edwin Ellison, B.E.M. For services to the British Korean Veterans' Association.
- Terence John Martin Elphick, lately Project Manager, Skanska. For services to the Ministry of Defence.
- John Nicholas McAlpine Entwistle, D.L. For services the community in the North West.
- Robert Harald Faber, lately Project Director, Oxford University Press for the Oxford Dictionary of National Biography. For services to Scholarship.
- Leslie Stephen Fairweather. For services to Architecture, H.M. Prison Service and to the community in West Sussex.
- Robert Andrew Farmer, lately Chief Executive, Forest Enterprise Wales.
- Andrew Farrell, Wigan and Great Britain Rugby Captain. For services to Rugby League.
- David Findlay, Managing Director, Automotive Technik Ltd. For services to the Defence Industry.
- Nigel Kennedy-Finlayson, lately Head, Business and Information Systems Division, National Assembly for Wales.
- Alexander Barry Fisher, Captain, British Airways. For services to Civil Aviation.
- Sally Margaret Doris, Mrs. Floyer, Managing Director, Frederick Warne and Co. For services to Publishing and to Tourism in the Lake District.
- Peter Karl James Franzen, Editor, Eastern Daily Press. For services to Journalism.
- Edward Friel, Chief Executive, Greater Glasgow and Clyde Valley Tourist Board. For services to Tourism in Scotland.
- Anne, Mrs. Galbraith. For services to the community in the North East.
- Archibald Duncan Galloway. For services to the Corporation and City of London.
- Hugh Gardner, Director of Social Services and Housing, City and County of Swansea. For services to Social Care.
- Miss Sharon Girling, Detective Constable, National Crime Squad. For services to the Police.
- Robert Mark Glover, for services to fostering and childcare in China.
- Duncan Bruce Godefroy, J.P. For services to the community in Plymouth.
- Dr. Alison Jane Patricia Goligher, Vice President of Production, Schlumberger. For services to the Oil and Gas Industries.
- Ian Gordon, Q.P.M., Deputy Chief Constable, Tayside Police. For services to the Police in Scotland.
- Martin Edwin Gorham, Chief Executive, National Blood Authority. For services to the NHS.
- Anthony Ernest Grant, Vice-Chair, Leeds and Holbeck Building Society. For public services in West Yorkshire.
- Ms Katherine Anne Green, Chief Executive, Child Poverty Action Group and Member, National Employment Panel. For services to Welfare Work.
- Catherine, Mrs. Griffiths, Head, Radiation Protection and QA Services, Directorate of Medical Imaging and Medical Physics, Sheffield Teaching Hospitals NHS Trust. For services to Medicine.
- Professor Ralph Alan Griffiths, Chair, Royal Commission on the Ancient and Historical Monuments of Wales. For services to Heritage.
- Trevor Thomas Griffiths, Chair, Law and Constitution Committee, General Dental Council. For services to Dentistry.
- Philip Howard Gronow, Deputy Director, Corporate Support Group, Receivables Management Service, Inland Revenue.
- Graham Richard Hadfield, Chief Executive, Civil Service Insurance Society. For public service.
- Robert James Hancock, Regional Secretary, Transport and General Workers Union. For services to the Trade Union Movement in Wales.
- Ann Christine, Mrs. Harris, Headteacher, Oaktree Nursery and Primary School, Swindon, Wiltshire. For services to Education.
- Sue, Mrs. Harrison, Assistant Director, European Markets, Department of Trade and Industry.
- Professor George Hazel, lately President, Institution of Highways and Transportation. For services to Transport.
- David Heather, lately Deputy Chief Executive, Agricultural Industries Confederation. For services to the Fertiliser Industry.
- James Hehir, Chief Executive, Ipswich Borough Council. For services to Local Government.
- Miss Susan Jane Hemming, Crown Prosecutor, Crown Prosecution Service.
- Annabel, Mrs. Hemstedt, lately Executive Director, Basic Skills Agency. For services to Basic Skills Education.
- Wilfred Neale Henderson, Technical Operations Manager, National Audit Office.
- George Charles Hepburn, Chief Executive, Community Foundation serving Tyne and Wear and Northumberland. For services to the community in the North East.
- Robert Graham Hubbard, Principal and Chief Executive, Prior's Court School, Thatcham, Berkshire. For services to Special Needs Education.
- Dr. John David Wynne Hudson, lately Headteacher, Holloway School, Islington, London. For services to Education.
- William Joseph Hutcheson, Headteacher, Elm Court School, Lambeth, London. For services to Special Needs Education.
- Robert Neil Hutley, Justices' Chief Executive for Devon and Cornwall. For services to the Administration of Justice.
- David Keith Marlais James, lately Chair, Eversheds LLP. For services to Business and to the community in Wales.
- Karl William Pamp Jenkins, Composer. For services to Music.
- Joyce Sara Ramsay, Mrs. Johnston, Principal, Fife College of Further and Higher Education. For services to Further Education in Scotland.
- Carol, Mrs. Jones, Headteacher, St. Barnabas Church of England Primary School, Bristol. For services to Education.
- Dr. William Johnstone Jordan, Vice-President, RSPCA. For services to Wildlife Conservation and Animal Welfare.
- Desmond Hugh Kelly, Assistant Director, Birmingham Royal Ballet. For services to Dance.
- Claude Alaric Anthony Kilmister. For services to Health and to the Prayer Book Society.
- Samuel Kinkaid. For public service.
- John Andrew Kissock, Joint Managing Director, James Jones and Sons. For services to Forestry.
- Sheelin Virginia, The Viscountess Knollys, D.L. For services to the community in Norfolk.
- Paul Crosby Lamplugh. For services to The Suzy Lamplugh Trust.
- Advocate John Emile Langlois, lately Peoples' Deputy to the States of Guernsey. For services to the community in Guernsey.
- Dr. Colin Reginald Lattimore, J.P. For services to English Decorative and Applied Fine Arts and to the community in Cambridge.
- Lilian, Mrs. Lawson, Director, Scottish Council on Deafness. For services to Deaf People.
- Dr. Phillip Andrew Leech, Principal Medical Officer for Primary Care, Department of Health.
- David Graham Lendon, Chair, Lincolnshire Business Education Trust. For services to Education.
- David Ross Leslie, Service Development Manager, City of Edinburgh Council. For services to Local Government.
- Dorothy Eva, Mrs. Levy, lately Educational Consultant, Attention Deficit Disorders Information Services. For services to Special Needs Education.
- Dennis Licence, Managing Director, First Trust Bank. For services to Banking and to the community in Northern Ireland.
- Miss Ceinwen Susan Jane Lloyd, Branch Manager (Births and Deaths). General Register Office, Southport, Office for National Statistics.
- Thomas Paul Lloyd, Grade 7, Disability and Carers Service, Department for Work and Pensions.
- Brian Richard Lord, first secretary, FCO.
- Ralph David Luck, Director, English Partnerships. For services to Urban Regeneration.
- Jacqueline Elizabeth, Mrs. Lythell, Alderman, Brighton and Hove City Council. For services to the community in Brighton and Hove.
- Gavin Anderson Mackay, M.B.E., Grade 7, Prime Minister's Office,
- Andrew Makepeace, Project Sponsor, Parliamentary Estates Directorate, House of Commons.
- Dr. Michael Maloney, Freelance Photographer. For services to Photojournalism.
- John Malynn, Team Leader, School Inspection and OFSTED Corporate Relations Unit, Local Authority Performance Division, Department for Education and Skills.
- Professor Gerald Manners, Chair, Association of Charitable Foundations. For charitable services.
- Wendy Rita, Mrs. Marrable, lately Special Investigation Section Team Leader, Inland Revenue.
- Brian Peter Marsh. For services to Business and to the Marsh Christian Trust in London.
- John Marshall, Consultant, Marshall Construction. For services to the Construction Industry and to the community in Clackmannanshire.
- Simon McBurney, Actor and Artistic Director, Theatre de Complicité. For services to Drama.
- Dr. Norman Keith Ian McIver. For services to Diving Safety.
- Sheila Mary, Mrs. McKinley, Head, Producer Responsibility Unit, Waste Management Division, Department for Environment, Food and Rural Affairs.
- James Malcolm McManners, Headteacher, Cassop Primary School, Durham. For services to Education.
- Roger James Mercer, lately Secretary, Royal Commission on Ancient and Historical Monuments of Scotland. For services to Archaeology.
- Professor Victor Thomas Charles Middleton. For services to Tourism.
- William Ian Mitchell. For services to Housing in Scotland.
- Dr. Peter Douglas Molyneux, Chief Executive Officer, Lionhead Studios. For services to the Computer Video Games Industry.
- Colin Stuart Montgomerie, M.B.E. For services to Golf.
- The Right Reverend Alan Wyndham Morgan. For services to the community in Nottinghamshire.
- Philip Jonathan Clifford Mould, Honorary Arts Adviser to the Houses of Parliament.
- Professor Charles William Munn, Chief Executive, Chartered Institute of Bankers in Scotland. For services to Banking.
- Dr. Wadi Yusuf Nassar. For services to Community Relations in Manchester.
- Peter Andrew Nicholson, Head, Newham Youth OVending Services. For services to Youth and Community Justice, London.
- Derek Norcross, D.L. For services to the community in East Sussex.
- Michael Anthony O'Connor, Grade B2, Ministry of Defence.
- Yvonne Margaret, Mrs. Osman, Member, Scottish Legal Aid Board. For services to the Administration of Justice.
- Geoffrey Palmer, Actor. For services to Drama.
- Dr. Syed Abdul-Aziz Pasha, Founder, Union of Muslim Organisations. For services to Race Relations.
- Dr. John Gordon Paterson, Deputy Chair, UK Screening Committee. For services to Cancer Screening.
- Frederick Charles Anthony Payne, lately General Manager, Ordnance Survey, Office of the Deputy Prime Minister.
- David Lee Pearson, M.B.E. For services to Equestrianism and to Disabled Sport.
- Anthony William Dunn Pexton, lately Chair, Sustainable LINK Programme Management Committee and Assured Combinable Crops. For services to Arable Agriculture.
- Janet Dorothy, Mrs. Pickles, Cardiff Women's Safety Unit. For services to Community Safety in South Wales.
- Mary Laird, Mrs. Pitcaithly, Chief Executive, Falkirk Council. For services to Local Government.
- Adrian Mark Pollitt Director, Office of the Strategic Health Authorities. For services to the NHS.
- Samuel David Pollock. For public service.
- Colin Dunlop Port, Deputy Chief Constable, Norfolk Constabulary. For services to the Police.
- Miss April Ann Pumfleet, Principal Inspector (Development), Havering Local Education Authority. For services to Education.
- John James Quigley, Grade B1, Ministry of Defence.
- Stephen Bradley Quinn, Grade B1, Ministry of Defence.
- Roger George Radford. For services to the Church of England.
- Donald Raistrick, Head, Knowledge and Information Resources Branch, Department for Constitutional Affairs.
- David Michael Ronald Reading, Founder, Anaphylaxis Campaign. For services to People with Allergies.
- Shelia, Mrs. Reiter, Chair, WaterVoice Wessex. For services to the Water Industry.
- Sheelagh Elizabeth, Mrs. Richards, Secretary and Chief Executive, British Association of Occupational Therapists and College of Occupational Therapists. For services to Healthcare.
- Margaret Ann, Mrs. Richardson, Curator, Sir John Soane's Museum, London. For services to Museums.
- Nigel Robbins, Principal, Cirencester College, Gloucestershire. For services to Further Education and to Training.
- Miss Shirley Ann Robertson, M.B.E. For services to Sailing.
- Kevin Peter James Rogers, Director, H.M. Prison Dovegate, Uttoxeter, Staffordshire. For services to the Contracted-Out Prison Service.
- Sarindar Singh Sahota, Chair, SRB 6 North West Corridors of Regeneration. For services to the community in Handsworth, Birmingham.
- Anthony Paul Sangwine, Specialist Adviser, Horticulture and Nature Conservation, Highways Agency.
- Christopher Andrew Saunders. For services to Save the Children UK.
- Neil Scales, Chief Executive and Director General, Merseyside Passenger Transport Authority and Executive. For services to Public Transport.
- Robert Leslie Scott, lately Acting Director, Museum of Science and Industry, Manchester. For services to Museums.
- Robert William Lowry Scott, D.L., lately Chair, Forestry and Timber Association. For services to Forestry.
- Stephen Francis Seaber, Chief Fire Officer, Hertfordshire Fire and Rescue Service. For services to the Fire Rescue Service.
- Rodney Horrocks Sellers. For services to Business in the North West.
- Miss Alexandra Shulman, Editor, British Vogue. For services to the Magazine Industry.
- Pamela Minerva Odette, Mrs. Singh, lately Headteacher, Pope John Roman Catholic Primary School, Shepherds Bush, London. For services to Education.
- Guy Sizeland, Grade B2, Ministry of Defence.
- David Ronald Smith, Regional Home Office Director, Government Office for the North West.
- Philip John Snell, Grade 7, Special Educational Needs Policy Framework and Transition Team, Department for Education and Skills.
- Ms Mary Arlene Anne Spiers, Chief Executive, Ulster Cancer Foundation. For services to Healthcare.
- Bernard Geoffrey Spittle. For services to Sports Administration.
- Christopher Austin Stendall, Grade 7, Regeneration Sponsorship Division, Office of the Deputy Prime Minister.
- David William Edmund Sterry, Chief Executive, May Gurney Integrated Services plc. For services to Civil Engineering.
- Angela Patricia, Mrs. Stones, Headteacher, McMillan Nursery School, Kingston-upon-Hull. For services to Early Years Education.
- Peter Stoppard. For services to the community in the South West.
- Kenneth Graham Stott. For services to the Willow Industry in the South West.
- John Richard Thomas Sullivan, Writer. For services to Drama.
- Stacey, Mrs. Tasker, lately Governor, H.M.Prison Leeds.
- Anthony Bichard Taylor, Chair, Borders NHS Board. For services to the NHS and to Business in Scotland.
- Peter Tebbit, National Palliative Care Development Adviser, National Council for Palliative Care. For services to Healthcare.
- Leslie Thomas, Writer. For services to Literature.
- Councillor William Humphrey Thomas, lately Chair, Sandwell Mental Health NHS and Social Care Trust. For services to the NHS in the West Midlands.
- Ling, Mrs. Thompson, Head of International Affairs, Royal Society. For services to Science.
- Alan Sidney Tobias, Chair, Essex Probation Board. For services to the National Probation Service and to Community Relations.
- Roger Townsend, Deputy Field Director, Jobcentre Plus, Department for Work and Pensions.
- John Colin Turner, Chair, Advisory Committee on Packaging. For services to Waste Management.
- Mark Vaughan, Founder and Co-Director, Centre for Studies on Inclusive Education. For services to Inclusion in Education.
- Professor Susan Mary Vinnicombe, Professor of Organisational Behaviour and Diversity Management, Cranfield School of Management. For services to Diversity.
- Sadru Visram, Chair, ASRA Greater London Housing Association. For services to Social Housing.
- George Vongas, Grade B2, Defence Science Technology Laboratory, Ministry of Defence.
- Ms Marjorie Henderson Walker, Joint Managing Director, Walkers Shortbread Ltd. For services to Business and Exports.
- Michael Walker, lately Vice-Chair, NHS Lothian and Consul for Finland. For services to the NHS and to the community in Edinburgh.
- Graham Ward, Chair, National Farmers' Union Horticulture Board. For services to Horticulture.
- Ms Caroline Anne Warne (Mrs. Thomas), J.P., Chair, International Standards Organisation's Committee on Consumer Policy. For services to Consumers.
- Dr. Peter Alan Waterman, Producer and Composer. For services to Music.
- Michael Reginald White, Emeritus Fellow, Policy Studies Institute, University of Westminster. For services to Labour Market Policy.
- Professor David Keith Whittaker, Professor of Forensic Dentistry, University of Wales College of Medicine. For services to Forensic Dentistry.
- Dr. Stephen Thomas Whittle. For services to Gender Issues.
- Bradley Marc Wiggins, Cyclist. For services to Sport.
- Tom Wilkinson, Actor. For services to Drama.
- John Williams, Q.F.S.M., Firemaster, Grampian Fire and Rescue Service. For services to the Fire Service.
- John Goodall Wilson, lately Headteacher, College House Junior School. For services to Education and to the community in Nottingham.
- Dr. Winston Reginald Withey, Technical Director, Centre for Human Sciences, QinetiQ. For services to the Armed Forces.
- Mark Worthington, Private Secretary to Lady Thatcher.

=== Members of the Order of the British Empire (MBE) ===
==== Civil Division ====
- Professor Michael George Abramson, Head, Combined Honours Unit, University of Central Lancashire. For services to Higher Education.
- Stanley Malcolm Ackroyd, Community Centre Manager, Idle Ward, Bradford Metropolitan District Council. For services to disabled people.
- Fred Adams, Hospital Porter, Scarborough Hospital. For services to the NHS in North East Yorkshire.
- Dr. Hari Pada Adhikary. For services to the Bengali community in the United Kingdom.
- Jean Elizabeth, Mrs. Agnew. For services to the community in St. Georges, Weston-Super-Mare.
- Zakia Masud, Mrs. Ahmed, Black and Minority Ethnic Development Worker, Special Needs Advisory Project. For services to the community in Wales.
- Mohammad Akram, Senior Policy Adviser, Finance, Department of Trade and Industry.
- Jack Alexander. For services to Entertainment in Scotland.
- Thomas Alexander. For services to Entertainment in Scotland.
- John Alvis, Managing Director, Alvis Bros Ltd. For services to Agriculture in the South West.
- George Anderson, lately Head of School of Horticulture, Royal Botanic Garden, Edinburgh. For services to Horticultural Education.
- James Allan Anderson. For services to Disabled Sport.
- Ms Janet Anderson. For services to the community in Greater Easterhouse, Glasgow.
- Margaret, Mrs. Anderton, Member, Council for Award in Children's Care and Education. For services to Childcare.
- Peter John Antonelli, Music Development Officer, Preston Lodge High School, East Lothian. For services to Music Education.
- Ms Anjum Anwar. For services to the community in Lancashire.
- Judith, Mrs. Archer, Head of Student Support, Hampshire County Council. For services to Higher Education.
- Miss Elizabeth Joan Arendt. For charitable services.
- Peter Arnold. For services to Alderney's Heritage.
- Patricia Ann, Mrs. Ashdown, Personal Assistant, Kent and Medway Strategic Health Authority. For services to the NHS.
- David Richard Guy Astbury, Producer and Presenter, British Forces Broadcasting Service. For services to Broadcasting.
- Rosemary Avis, Mrs. Augar, Field Officer, The Duke of Edinburgh's Award Scheme. For services to Young People in Malling, Kent.
- Ms Sarah Ayton. For services to Sailing.
- Paul Ralph Roy Backhouse, Systems Manager, Lancashire Magistrates' Courts. For services to the Administration of Justice.
- Balbir, Mrs. Bahrha, Grade C2, Ministry of Defence.
- Bruce Trevor Bailey, lately Area Operations Manager, Southern England, Inland Revenue.
- Douglas Bailey, Driver and Trade Union Representative, Stagecoach. For services to Passenger Transport in Lancashire.
- Miss Rosemary Janet Bailey, Disability Adviser, Hertfordshire Guiding. For services to Young People.
- Rachel Frances, Mrs. Baker, Foster Carer. For services to Children in York.
- Valerie, Mrs. Baldry, Social Survey Field Interviewer, Office of National Statistics.
- Alison Jane, Mrs. Balsamini, Teaching Assistant, Settle Middle School, North Yorkshire. For services to Education.
- Deborah Joan, Mrs. Barber, Director, South of England Agricultural Society. For services to Agriculture.
- Allan Cameron Barclay. For services to the community in Golspie, Sutherland.
- Brian Barnes, Artist. For services to the community in Battersea, London.
- Ann Elizabeth, Mrs. Barr, Bursar, The Mosslands School, Wallasey, Wirral. For services to Education.
- Marion, Mrs. Barrett. For services to the community in Lancashire.
- Barbara Anne, Mrs. Bartlett, Personal Secretary, H.M. Prison Service Headquarters.
- Michael Bartlett. For services to the community in Norfolk.
- Richard Anthony Bartlett, Administrative Officer, Independent Education and Boarding Team, School Transport, Safety & Independent Education Division, Department for Education and Skills.
- Elizabeth Mary, Mrs. Barton, Foster Carer. For services to Children and Families in Portsmouth.
- Kathleen Muriel, Mrs. Bass, lately Academic Counsellor, The Hewett School, Norwich. For services to Education.
- Peter John Bath. For services to Business and to Charity in Bournemouth, Dorset.
- Miss Wendy Baum, Teacher, Eleanor Palmer Primary School, Camden, London. For services to Education.
- Miss Virginia Anne Beal, Grade E1, Ministry of Defence.
- Peter Leslie Beales, President, Royal National Rose Society. For services to Horticulture.
- Robert Mervyn Beales, lately Higher Executive Officer and Chair, Trade Union Side, Rural Payments Agency.
- Gerald Bee, Principal Officer, H.M. Prison Full Sutton, North Yorkshire.
- Malcolm Belchamber. For services to the community in Littlehampton, West Sussex.
- Colin Bell. For services to the community in Manchester.
- Trevor Lionel Bennett. For charitable services in Leicester.
- William Berry. For services to Judo.
- Ian Hartley Berwick, General Secretary, UK Vineyard Association. For services to the Wine Industry.
- Councillor Colin Willoughby Beswick. For services to the community in Durham.
- Antony Lawrence Blackler. For services to Conservation in Cornwall.
- Miss Patricia Blaize, Administrative Officer, Health and Safety Executive.
- Glynis Geraldine, Mrs. Bliss. For services to Victim Support Service.
- Miss Andrea Lorraine Blower, Grade C1, Ministry of Defence.
- Estelle Mary, Mrs. Blyth. For services to the community in Sheringham, Norfolk.
- Alan Booth, Scarborough Town Crier and Co-owner, Ryedale Hotel. For services to Tourism and to the community in Scarborough, Yorkshire.
- Vivien Eleanor, Mrs. Pleydell-Bouverie, President, Anglia Region of Girlguiding. For services to Young People.
- Ms Margaret Mary Bowden, Higher Executive Officer, Immigration and Nationality Directorate, Home Office.
- Miss Kathleen Bowerbank. For charitable services in SuVolk and Norfolk.
- Jennifer, Mrs. Bowers, Executive Officer, Pension Service, Department for Work and Pensions.
- Alice Patricia, Mrs. Bradley, Co-ordinator and Founder, Fellowship House Children's Centre, Newham, London. For services to Children.
- Donald Charles Brand, Consultant to the Social Care Institute for Excellence. For services to Social Care.
- Robin Bream, Senior Executive Officer, Post 16 Equal Opportunities Policy Team, Learning and Skills Partnerships Unit, Department for Education and Skills.
- Colin Brierley. For services to the community in Gorton, Manchester.
- Elsie Marina, Mrs. Bright, Captain, 1st Spalding Company, The Girls' Brigade, Lincolnshire. For services to Young People.
- John Brimble. For services to the Heritage of the Black Country, West Midlands.
- Linda Christine, Mrs. Brook, Schools Finance Support Officer, City of York Council. For services to Education.
- Martin Slater Brookes, D.L., J.P. For services to the community in Telford, Shropshire.
- Dr. Ronald Burgess Broughton. For services to Freshwater Fisheries in the North West.
- David Brown, J.P. For services to the community in Northumberland.
- Lorna, Mrs. Hamilton-Brown. For services to the community in Leicestershire.
- The Reverend Louise Margaret Brown. For services to the community in Dedworth, Windsor, Berkshire.
- Raymond Arthur Brown. For services to the Environment Agency.
- Miss Yvonnne Patricia Brown, Senior Personal Secretary, Community Cohesion Unit, Communities Group, Home Office.
- Jill, Mrs. Brownsword, Administrative Officer, Jobcentre Plus, Department for Work and Pensions.
- Dr. Michael John Bruton, Chairman, The Disabled Ramblers. For services to disabled people.
- Neil Buchan, Board Member, Institution of Civil Engineers Municipal Group. For services to Municipal Engineering and to the Transport Industry in Scotland.
- Andrew Richard Bunting, District Scout Leader, Hatfield Forest, Essex. For services to Young People.
- Alan Burns, Member, Aberdeenshire Children's Panel. For services to Children in Scotland.
- Ms Christine Burns, lately Vice-President of Press for Change. For services to Gender Issues.
- Hugh Clark Burns. For services to Children with Special Needs in Gibshill, Greenock, Renfrewshire.
- Professor Roger Burridge. For services to the Health and Safety Executive.
- Anne Patricia, Mrs. Burrowes. For services to the community in Dorrington, Lincoln.
- David Arthur Byatt. For services to the community in Moray.
- Robert Callahan. For services to Gymnastics.
- Margaret, Mrs. Cameron, Farmer. For services to Agriculture in Scotland.
- Darren Andrew Campbell, Sprinter. For services to Athletics.
- Margretta Maud, Mrs. Campbell, School Crossing Warden, South Eastern Education and Library Board. For services to Education in Northern Ireland.
- Sheila Elizabeth Jill, Mrs. Campbell, Member, Castle Morpeth Borough Council. For services to the community in Newcastle-upon-Tyne.
- Jerome Weir Cant, lately Finance and Administration Manager, H.M. Prison Glenochil.
- Dr. David James Carmichael, Managing Director, Battle and Pears Ltd. For services to Agricultural Research.
- Sarah Margaret, Mrs. Cartwright, J.P., D.L., lately Chair, Ross and Cromarty Enterprise. For services to Business.
- Bill Cassie, Head, Consumer Protection and Support Services, Aberdeenshire Council. For services to Consumers in Scotland.
- Dr. Alexander John McMurrough Cavenagh. For services to the community in Brecon, Powys.
- Janet, Mrs. Chaplin, Assistant Chief Probation Officer. For services to the National Probation Service in South Wales.
- Miss Sandra Denise Chapman. For services to the RSPCA in Humberside and Lincolnshire.
- George Robert Chatel. For services to Charities and to the community in the Isle of Man.
- Alice Mrs. Cheung Sui Ting, Restaurateur and Entrepreneur. For services to the Culinary Industry and to the community in Cardiff.
- Ms Janet Chierchia. For services to Young People with Special Needs and to the community in Hampshire.
- Stanley Howard Chilcott. For services to the community in Silverton, Devon.
- Patricia, Mrs. Zadora-Chrzastowska, Management Consultant, Thomas-Zadora Associates. For services to Business in the East Midlands.
- Michael Peter Clapham, Group Leader, Reading Buses. For services to Passenger Transport and to the community in Berkshire.
- Professor Brian Drummond Clark, Board Member, Scottish Environment Protection Agency. For services to the Environment.
- Geoffrey Harold Clark, Assistant Director, Deloitte and Touche. For services to the Ministry of Defence.
- Lionel James Clark. For services to the Automobile Association.
- Morina, Mrs. Clarke, Regional Services Manager, Epilepsy Action. For services to People with Epilepsy in Northern Ireland.
- Margaret Joyce, Mrs. Cobern, School Crossing Warden, Breamore Primary School, Fordingbridge, Hampshire. For services to Education.
- Gerald Cole. For services to Heritage and to the community in Kendal, Cumbria.
- Celia Jane, Mrs. Collett. For services to the community in Brightwell-cum-Sotwell, Oxfordshire.
- Major Henry Brett Collier, Area President, Ramblers' Association, Lincolnshire. For services to Recreational Walkers.
- Terence Collins. For services to the Physically Handicapped and Able-bodied Association in Merthyr Tydfil, South Wales.
- Brian Connelly. For services to the community in Auchenback, East Renfrewshire.
- Anthony George Constable. For services to the Civil Service Sports Council.
- Edward Robert Coode, Rower. For services to Sport.
- Gordon John Cook, Station Officer. For services to the Fire Service in Wick, Caithness.
- Raymond Cooper, lately Site Manager, Sacred Heart Roman Catholic School, Harrow, London. For services to Education.
- David Nevil Cordon, Founder, Woolpit Arts Festival. For services to the community in Woolpit, Suffolk.
- The Reverend Canon Warrington Graham Corneck. For services to the community in Deptford, London.
- Tina Patricia, Mrs. Cornish, Youth Club Leader, Loders Youth Club. For services to Young People in Bridport, Dorset.
- Major George Francis Correa. For services to the Royal Artillery Charitable Fund.
- William Coupar, Director, Involvement and Participation Association. For services to Business.
- Keith Richard Cowan. For services to Diversity in Scotland.
- Mary, Mrs. Cowie, Catering Manager, Seaton Infants School, Workington, Cumbria. For services to Education.
- Miss Barbara Amelia Stewart Craig. For services to the National Trust in the West Midlands.
- Leonard Craig, Group Manager, Valuation Office Agency, Manchester.
- Miss Paula Craig, Detective Sergeant, Metropolitan Police Service. For services to the Police.
- Penelope Ann, Mrs. Creighton. For services to the community on the Isle of Man.
- Robert Marks Creswell, Corporate AVairs Manager, Coolkeeragh Power Limited. For services to the Energy Industry.
- Rose Mrs. Cromb. For services to the Northern Ireland Hospice.
- Dr. John Hedley Cule. For services to Mental Health Care in West Wales.
- Margaret Elizabeth Mary, Mrs. Cummings, Assistant Divisional Librarian for Tyrone and Fermanagh. For services to Libraries in Northern Ireland.
- David Cunningham, Senior Executive Officer, Child Support Agency.
- Douglas Currie, Councillor, Argyll and Bute Council. For services to Local Government and to the community in Strachur and District.
- Roger William Dangerfield. For services to Health and Safety in the Offshore Industry.
- Dr. Clifford Thomas Dann. For charitable services.
- John Macdougall Danning, Director of Flight Operations, FR Aviation. For services to the Defence Industry.
- Barry George Davies, BBC Sports Commentator. For services to Sports Broadcasting.
- Eileen Adelaide, Mrs. Davies. For services to the community in Glenkindie, Aberdeenshire.
- Lesley Charles Davies, Senior Warden, Mendip Hills Area of Outstanding Natural Beauty Service. For services to the Environment.
- Keith Daniel Day, lately Administrative Director, Addenbrooke's Hospital NHS Trust, Cambridge. For services to the NHS.
- Royston Cecil Denning, lately Director of Finance and Facilities, Wiltshire Constabulary. For services to the Police.
- Jennifer Mary, Mrs. Dereham, D.L. For services to Heathland Housing in Herefordshire.
- Marlon Ronald Devonish, Sprinter. For services to Athletics.
- Marjorie Evelyn, Mrs. Dix. For services to the Myasthenia Gravis Association.
- Paul Dodd, Deputy Headteacher, Gilmour Junior School, Liverpool. For services to Education and to the community in Liverpool.
- Miss Clementina Bowie Dodds. For services to the British Red Cross Society in Fife.
- David Malcolm Doig. For services to the Victim Support Service in Somerset.
- Gloria Jean Regina, Mrs. Donaldson. For services to the Royal Air Force Benevolent Fund.
- Marilyn, Mrs. Dovey, Secretary and Youth Leader, TGI Friary Youth Club. For services to Young People in Salisbury.
- Samuel Dow, Training Officer, Apex Scotland. For services to the community in Lanarkshire.
- Mary, Mrs. Dowding, Founder and Trustee, Midstream Charity. For services to disabled people in Lancashire.
- Robert Draper. For services to the Bath Royal Literary and Scientific Institution.
- Violet, Mrs. Drummond. For services to the community in Oldham, Greater Manchester.
- Charles Vincent Anstey Duggleby, Broadcaster and Journalist. For services to Financial Services.
- Miss Anita Jo Dunn. For services to Conservation in Oxfordshire.
- Robert Dunne, Secretary of the Social Society, Arriva North West & Wales. For services to Passenger Transport.
- Frederick John Dyer. For services to the community in Threemilestone, Cornwall.
- Timothy John Easlea. For public service.
- Miss Bridget Eccles, Clerk, Churchstow Parish Council. For services to the community in Kingsbridge, Devon.
- Christopher Edge, Supported Housing Manager, Oaklee Housing Association Limited. For services to Social Housing in Northern Ireland.
- Margaret Ethel, Mrs. Edgington, County Properties Manager for Guiding in Berkshire. For services to Young People.
- Miss Brenda Edwards. For services to Dance.
- Major David James Emery, Community Chaplain, H.M. Prison Swansea. For services to H.M. Prison Service and to the community in Swansea.
- Rosemary Ann, Mrs. English, J.P. For services to the community in Norwich.
- Eileen, Mrs. Eskenzi. For services to the community in Totteridge, London.
- Joyce Winifred, Mrs. Farnham, Councillor, Stafford Borough Council and Stone Town Council. For services to Local Government and to the community in Staffordshire.
- Ruth Muriel, Mrs. Fawcett, Chair, Wokingham Early Years Development and Childcare Partnership, Berkshire. For services to Education.
- Frances, Mrs. Finlayson. For services to Nursing in Lanarkshire.
- Richard Edward Finlinson, Chair, Amphion Consortium. For services to Social Housing in London and the South East.
- Miriam Thelma, Mrs. Fish. For services to the community in Wolverhampton, West Midlands.
- Craig William Fisken, Senior Assurance Officer, H.M. Customs and Excise.
- Ann, Mrs. Flanagan. For services to the community in Vauxhall, Liverpool.
- Edna Gladys, Mrs. Fletcher. For services to Table Tennis.
- Graham Malcolm Flew, Grade E1, Ministry of Defence.
- Peter Kenrick Florence, Co-founder and Director, The Guardian Hay Festival. For services to Literature.
- Miss Frances Anderson Floyd. For services to the community in Manchester.
- Michael Foster, Education Manager, Community Services to Youth Justice Agency. For services to the community in Bangor, County Down.
- Ann, Mrs. Fowler, Foster Carer, Nottinghamshire. For services to Children and Families.
- Timothy John Foxley, Grade C1, Ministry of Defence. Miss Helen France, Artist. For services to Art and to the community in Leeds.
- Mark Anthony Lewis-Francis, Sprinter. For services to Athletics.
- Edith, Mrs. Franklin. For services to the community in Jersey.
- James Ivor Frapwell. For services to the Royal Gloucestershire Hussars G Squadron Old Comrades' Association.
- Bridget Philomena, Mrs. Fraser. For services to Older People in West Dunbartonshire.
- Camilla Cormack (Sheila), Mrs. Fraser, Higher Executive Officer, Jobcentre Plus, Department for Work and Pensions.
- Miss Jill Fraser, Artistic Director, Watermill Theatre, Newbury, Berkshire. For services to Drama.
- Sheila Kathleen, Mrs. Gallagher, School Crossing Warden. For services to Education in London.
- Peter Edward Gallant. For services to the community in Leeds.
- Christopher Galvin, Committee Secretary, UNISON. For services to the Environment Agency.
- Brij Lata, Mrs. Gandhi. For services to Community Relations and to Charity in Scotland.
- Jason Carl Gardener, Sprinter. For services to Athletics.
- Mary, Mrs. Garrett, Grade C1, Prime Minister's Office.
- David Gelly, Musician, Writer and Broadcaster. For services to Jazz Music.
- Edwin John Gillanders. For services to Agriculture and to Agricultural Journalism.
- Anthony Stephen Gillon, Administrative Officer, Oldham County Court, The Court Service, Department for Constitutional Affairs.
- Miss Margaret Ena Glasgow, Tutor, Distance Learning Courses for Teachers of the Deaf, Birmingham, Hertfordshire and Oxford Brookes Universities. For services to Special Needs Education.
- Edna, Mrs. Glenton, Teaching Assistant, Kingston Park Primary School, Newcastle-upon-Tyne. For services to Education.
- Ms Patricia Irene Goodwin. For services to the community in Abingdon, Oxfordshire.
- Miss Dorothy Gorman. For services to the Women's Royal Voluntary Service and to the community in Stranraer.
- Patricia Ann, Mrs. Goucher. For services to the Eastern Area Sea Cadet Corps.
- Lillias Blair, Mrs. Gould. For services to the Ayrshire Council on Alcohol.
- Lawrence James Goveas, Member, North Tyneside Metropolitan Borough Council. For services to the community in Tyne and Wear.
- The Reverend John Galbraith Graham, Crossword Compiler. For services to the Newspaper Industry.
- Sister Eileen Mary Grant. For services to the British Army.
- Dr. Robert Morrison Grant, Chair, Primary Care Group, SCAN (South East Scotland Cancer Network). For services to Healthcare in Fife.
- Bruce Sidney Grantham, Site Supervisor, Barry Primary School, Northampton. For services to Education.
- Malcolm Colborne Gray, lately Coxswain, St. David's Lifeboat, Pembrokeshire. For services to the Royal National Lifeboat Institute.
- Morag Graham, Mrs. Gray, lately Chief Executive, Hamilton Park Race Course. For services to Horse Racing.
- Alexander Nowell Grayson. For services to the community in Woking, Surrey.
- Joyce, Mrs. Green, lately Detective Inspector, Lancashire Constabulary. For services to the Police.
- Miss Sadie Greer. For services to St. John Ambulance Brigade.
- Miss Carol Gregg, Grade C1, Ministry of Defence.
- Joseph Walter Griffiths, Councillor, Powys County Council. For services to the community in Powys.
- Robert James David Gulliford, Councillor, Blaenavon Community Council. For services to the Royal British Legion and to the community in Blaenavon, Torfaen.
- David MacGillvray Gunn. For services to the Glencoe Mountain Rescue, Argyll.
- Glenis, Mrs. Guy, Chair, Edward Guy Foundation. For services to the community in the North East.
- Derek Hall, Works, Quality and Environmental Manager, Bovince Ltd. For services to the Environment.
- Nishat, Mrs. Hamid. For services to Healthcare in Bristol.
- Colin Michael Hammond, Founder Member and Chief Executive, National Organisation for Phobias, Anxiety Neuroses Information and Care. For services to Healthcare.
- Derek Francis Hammond, Chief Inspector, Metropolitan Police Service. For services to the Police and to the community in Surrey.
- Merwyn Chambers Hanna, Chair, Kilkeel Fundraising Branch and President, Kilkeel Lifeboat Station. For services to the Royal National Lifeboat Institution in Northern Ireland.
- Celia Louise, Mrs. Harding, Founder, Jack and Jill Pre- School, Beaconsfield, Buckinghamshire. For services to Early Years Education.
- Thomas Owens Harrigan, Race Relations Officer, Strathclyde Police. For services to the Police.
- Dr. Pamela Fay Harrison, Founder, Jeffery Harrison Memorial Trust. For services to Conservation in Kent.
- Miss Muriel Margaret Hart, Piano Accompanist, Brighton Orpheus Choir. For services to Music and to the community in Brighton and Hove.
- Richard Humphrey Harvey, Director, Manor Farm Feeds Ltd., and Chair, Rural Energy Trust. For services to Agriculture in the East Midlands.
- Christine, Mrs. Hawkins. For services to the study of Obesity.
- Dorothy Andrea Susan, Mrs. Hayes. For services to the community in Bracknell Forest, Berkshire.
- Marie Merlyn, Mrs. Hayes. For services to the RSPCA in Norfolk.
- Lionel Hehir, Executive Director, Groundwork Trust, South Tyneside. For services to the Environment.
- Patricia, Mrs. Helsby, Senior Operations Manager, H.M. Customs and Excise.
- Robert Charles Hepworth, Director, Urban Regeneration and Housing, St. Helens Council. For services to Local Government.
- Clive Hershman, Chairman, SHARE Community. For services to disabled people.
- Norman Peter Hickman, Head, Peter Hickman Hairdressing School and Salons and Founder, Pied Piper Trust. For services to Business and to Young People in Gloucestershire.
- Miss Barbara Jean Hill. For services to the National Trust in the West Midlands.
- Mary, Mrs. Hillis, Cleaner, Maybin Support Services. For services to the community in Belfast.
- Sheila Mary, Mrs. Hills, Personal Secretary, H.M. Customs and Excise.
- Loraine Pauline, Mrs. Histed, Senior Security Officer, Department for International Development.
- Beatrice Gertrude, Mrs. Hobson, District Manager, Citizens' Advice Bureau, Horsham. For services to the community in West Sussex.
- John William Hockley, Secretary, National Association of Retired Firefighters. For services to the Fire Service.
- Gillean Stewart, Mrs. Hoehnke, Staff Development Manager, Edinburgh's Telford College. For services to Further Education in Scotland.
- Kathleen, Mrs. Holley, Departmental Security Officer, Food Standards Agency. For services to HASSRA.
- Miss Margaret Augustine Holley, Head, Brig-y-Don Children's Home. For services to Disadvantaged Children in Jersey.
- John William Hope, Chair, Almeley Parish Council and Member, Herefordshire Council. For services to Local Government.
- Mary Elizabeth, Mrs. Hopkins, Founder and Trustee, Harlington Hospice, Middlesex. For services to the community in Middlesex.
- Gwen, Mrs. Horrigan. For services to the community in Leigh-on-Sea, Essex.
- Mildred, Mrs. Howell, lately Mathematics Teacher, Hurworth School, Darlington. For services to Education.
- Judith, Mrs. Howes, Teaching Assistant, Hardwick Primary School, Stockton-on-Tees. For services to Education.
- William Howie, Director, Voluntary Service Aberdeen. For services to the community in Aberdeen.
- Christopher Hoy. For services to Cycling.
- Robert Myles Huck, Head of Year, Whitehaven School, Cumbria. For services to Education.
- John Anthony Hughes, Caretaker and Teaching Assistant, Wrockwardine Wood Junior School, Shropshire. For services to Education.
- Kathleen Joan, Mrs. Hughes. For services to Health and to the community in South Warwickshire.
- Philip William Hughes, Director and Trustee, Royal Society for the Prevention of Accidents. For services to Health and Safety.
- Ms Joy Stell Humber. For services to Elderly People and to the community in Childswickham, Worcestershire.
- Peter Ronald Huxtable, Coxswain, Shoreham Harbour Lifeboat. For services to the Royal National Lifeboat Institute.
- Clare Ann, Mrs. Hyde, Director, Calderdale Women's Centre. For services to Healthcare for Women in Calderdale, West Yorkshire.
- Thomas Isbister, Crofter. For services to the community in Shetland.
- Syed Azizul Islam. For services to Community Relations in South London.
- Ian Jackson, Lay Member, H.M. Inspectorate of Education. For services to Education in Scotland.
- Betty Eva, Mrs. James, Foster Carer. For services to Children in Carmarthenshire.
- Ian Kennedy James, Principal Director, Tamworth and Lichfield College, StaVordshire. For services to Further Education.
- Peter Ronald James. For services to the Catering Industry and to the community in Powys, Wales.
- Phyllis, Mrs. James. For services to the community in Montpelier, Bristol.
- Ms Julia Carrina Jarrett, Hostel Manager, St. Mungo's Association. For services to Homeless People in London.
- John William Jeffrey. For services to the community in Surrey.
- Irene, Mrs. Jenkins, Site Agent, Pulloxhill Lower School, Pulloxhill, Bedfordshire. For services to Education.
- Patricia Mary Stevenson, Mrs. Jenkins, Head of Widening Participation, University of Liverpool. For services to Higher Education.
- Ann, Mrs. Johnson, Volunteer, Chanctonbury Community Playscheme, West Sussex. For services to Special Needs Children.
- Gilbert Johnson, Chair, Skerries Salmon. For services to Salmon Farming in Shetland.
- Andrew Ivan Egerton Johnston. For public service.
- Emily Margaret, Mrs. Johnston, Cleaner. For services to the Department of Education in Northern Ireland.
- James Summers Hamilton Johnston, Principal of Technology, Springburn Academy, Glasgow. For services to Education.
- Christine Joan, Mrs. Jones, lately Clinical Nurse Manager, Emergency Unit, Cardiff and Vale NHS Trust. For services to the NHS.
- Doreen, Mrs. Garland-Jones, Vice-Chair, Tidy Cheltenham Group. For services to the community in Cheltenham.
- Janet Elisabeth, Mrs. Jones, J.P., Administrative Officer, Department of Biological Sciences, University of Warwick. For services to Higher Education and to the community in Coventry.
- Ms Judith Patricia Jones, Judges' Clerk, The Court Service.
- Michael Denison Jones. For services to Nature Conservation in the Home Counties.
- Olabisi, Mrs. Akiwumi-Jones. For services to Young People in London.
- Peter Thomas Jones, Senior Executive Officer, Independent Police Complaints Commission.
- Celia Elizabeth, Mrs. Jordan. For services to the community in Warrington, Cheshire.
- William John Jordan, Chair, W. Jordan (Cereals) Ltd. For services to the Food and Drink Industries.
- Parmod Kad. For services to Community Relations in Southall, London.
- David Kamsler. For services to The Link and to the community in Basingstoke, Hampshire.
- Derek James Kane, Training Programmes Manager, Scottish Enterprise, Dunbartonshire. For services to Business in Dunbartonshire.
- Douglas James Keil, Q.P.M., General Secretary, Scottish Police Federation. For services to the Police.
- Ian Kendall, Principal Countryside and Forestry Officer, Calderdale Metropolitan Borough Council. For services to Local Government in West Yorkshire.
- Margaret Angela Barrie, Mrs. Kent. For services to the community in Cornwall.
- Margaret Elizabeth, Mrs. Kerr, Teaching Assistant, St. Edmund's Roman Catholic Primary School, Enfield, London. For services to Education.
- Ian Kershaw, Higher Executive Officer, Health and Safety Executive.
- June Margaret, Mrs. Keyte, Founder and Director Children's Voices of Enfield. For services to Music and to the community in London.
- Nazim Khan. For services to the community in Peterborough, Cambridgeshire.
- David Frederick King. For services to the St. John Ambulance and to Scouting in Romford, Essex.
- John Alan King, Deputy Headteacher, Greswold Primary School, Solihull. For services to Education.
- John Kirtley, Principal Doorkeeper, House of Lords.
- Dr. Alan Coates Klottrup. For services to the community in Durham.
- Brenda, Mrs. Lalonde. For services to WaterVoice Wessex Committee. For services to the Water Industry.
- Thomas John Kinloch Lambie, Administrative Officer, Jobcentre Plus, Department for Work and Pensions.
- Myra Ferguson, Mrs. Lamont, Associate Director of Nursing, Sandyford Initiative, Greater Glasgow NHS Trust. For services to Nursing.
- Brian John Lancashire, Patient Safety Manager, National Patient Safety Agency. For services to the NHS.
- Eric Lancashire. For services to the community in Horsley Woodhouse, Derbyshire.
- Lorraine, Mrs. Lauder. For services to Elderly People in Southwark, London.
- Dr. Heather Laurie, Manager of Survey Activities, UK Longitudinal Studies Centre, Institute for Social and Economic Research, University of Essex. For services to Social Science.
- Leslie Francis Lawson Law. For services to Equestrian Sport.
- Peter Lawler, Grade B2, Ministry of Defence.
- Barbara Noelle, Mrs. Leigh. For services to Nature Conservation in Middlesex
- David Stanley Lewis. For charitable services in South Wales.
- Norman Richard Lewis. For services to Nature Conservation in Nottinghamshire.
- Peter Liddle, County Archaeologist, Leicestershire County Council. For services to Community Archaeology.
- Ruth, Mrs. Lingard, Founder and Director, Fledglings, Cambridgeshire. For services to disabled young people.
- Hugh Lewis Lloyd, Actor. For services to Drama and to Charity.
- Richard John Lloyd, lately Head, Land Management and Countryside Capital, Countryside Agency. For services to the Environment.
- Kenneth George Lomas. For services to the Leukaemia Research Fund.
- Alfred Low, lately Building Inspector. For services to the Scottish Crop Research Institute and to the community in Invergowrie.
- Joseph Edward Lowthian. For services to the community in Penrith, Cumbria.
- Suzanne, Mrs. Lucas, lately President, Royal Society of Miniature Painters, Sculptors and Gravers. For services to the Arts.
- Fraser MacKenzie, Volunteer Leader Strathclyde Fire Brigade. For services to the Fire Service.
- Ian Maclean, Chair, Statistics Users' Council.
- Mary Bridgetta, Mrs. Magennis, Catering Manager, Northern Ireland Office.
- Miss Margaret Jessie Campbell Main, Research Technician, Department of Child Health, University of Aberdeen. For services to Higher Education and to Employee Relations.
- Jean Emily, Mrs. Makin. For services to H.M. Prison Stafford.
- George Edward Mangar. For services to the Independent Monitoring Board, H.M. Prison Brixton, London.
- Anne Lesley, Mrs. Mansell, Teaching Assistant, Seymour Road Primary School, Clayton, Manchester. For services to Education.
- Ronnie Marlor, Chair of Governors, CliVe Hill Community Primary School, Calderdale, West Yorkshire. For services to Education.
- Carole Joan, Mrs. Marr, Principal Teacher of Outdoor Education, St. Columba's School, Kilmacolm. For services to The Duke of Edinburgh's Award Scheme in Renfrewshire.
- Richard John Mason, Head of Building Projects Group, Council for the Central Laboratory of the Research Councils. For services to Science.
- Dr. Thomas Robert Mason, Director, Armagh Planetarium. For services to Astronomy Education.
- Brian Frederick Mathew. For services to Horticulture and to Botanical Science.
- James McCarte, Grade C1, Ministry of Defence.
- Susan Carol, Mrs. McCartney, Personal Assistant to the Director, Rothamsted Research. For services to Agricultural Research.
- Desmond McCaughan, Chair, Fundraising for Police Charities (Northern Ireland). For services to charity.
- Miss Rosemary McCloskey. For services to people with Learning Disabilities.
- Janet, Mrs. McCormack, Nursery Nurse, Millbank Primary School, Westminster, London. For services to Education.
- Christopher Robin McCormick, Divisional Manager, South East First Bus Group and UK Manager for Lifelong Learning. For services to Public Transport and to Basic Skills Education.
- John Kenneth McCullagh. For public service.
- George Ferguson McDonic, Chair, Campaign to Protect Rural England (Wiltshire). For services to Conservation.
- George McGarvey, Senior Executive Officer, Health and Safety Executive.
- Robert McKenna. For services to Entertainment and to Charity.
- Margaret Elizabeth, Mrs. McKillop, Senior Nurse Manager, Rehabilitation Directorate, Southern General Hospital, Glasgow. For services to Nursing.
- Ernest Templeton McMillen, Vice-President, Pony Club. For services to Horse Riding.
- Dr. Iain McNicol, General Medical Practitioner, Appin, Argyll. For services to Healthcare.
- Michael Stuart McNidder, Head of Developmental Services, City of Worcester. For services to Local Government.
- Gerard McQuillan, Capital Taxes Manager and Secretary of the Acceptance in Lieu Panel at the Museums, Libraries and Archives Council. For services to Heritage.
- Reg Mead, President, Bucks Schools Athletics Association. For services to Athletics.
- Maria Philomena, Mrs. Mendonca, Teacher, Sacred Heart Roman Catholic School, Peterborough. For services to Education.
- Mary, Mrs. Middleton. For services to the Royal British Legion in Derby.
- John Clive Milburne, Wildlife Inspector, Environment and Heritage Service, Department of the Environment, Northern Ireland Executive.
- Margaret Wilson, Mrs. Milligan. For services to the Citizens' Advice Bureau, Coatbridge.
- Thakorbhai Mistry. For services to the community in Alconbury, Cambridgeshire.
- Miss Sheila Lilian Mitchell, President, European Catering Association (Great Britain). For services to the Hospitality Industry.
- Herbert Inglis Mole, Chair, HorncliVe Parish Council. For services to Local Government in Berwick-upon-Tweed.
- Clive Anthony Morris, Deputy-Chair, National Black Police Association and Caretaker, Nottingham Police. For services to the Police and to the community in Nottingham.
- Evan John Morris, Public Relations Officer, Cheshire Fire Service. For services to the Fire Service.
- Miss Frances Margaret Morris. For services to the community in Tenbury Wells, Worcestershire.
- Harold Sydney Morris. For services to Community Relations in Stoke-on-Trent, StaVordshire.
- Donald Roddy Morrison, Janitor, Lionel School, Isle of Lewis. For services to Education in Scotland.
- Miss Alison Mortimer, Administrative Officer, Child Support Agency.
- Brian Anthony Morton, Conservation Engineer. For services to Heritage.
- Adrian Moss, Grade C1, Ministry of Defence.
- Albert David Moss, Honorary Secretary, Alzheimer's Society, Swansea and Lliw Valley Branch. For services to People with Alzheimer's Disease.
- Mary, Mrs. Moss. For services to the community in Newcastle-under-Lyme, StaVordshire.
- Richard Harry Moss. For services to Young People in North London.
- Dr. Shyamal Kumar Mukherjee, Board Member, Birkenhead and Wallasey Primary Care Trust. For services to Healthcare.
- Edith Agnes, Mrs. Murphy. For services to the community in Leicestershire.
- Christopher Needs, Radio Presenter. For charitable services in Wales.
- Elizabeth, Mrs. Nelis, Foster Carer. For services to Children in Belfast.
- Sydney Nicholson, Founder, Heart Call, South Tyneside. For services to People with Heart Disease in South Tyneside.
- Mehri, Mrs. Niknam. For services to Jewish-Muslim Inter-faith Relations.
- David Alasdair Nix. For services to the Donor Family Network and to the Siloan Christian Ministries.
- William Cecil Noble. For political and public service, and for services to Education.
- Seva Levenstein-Novgorodsev, Present, BBC Russian Service. For services to Broadcasting.
- Roy Herbert Nowell, Bandmaster, 13th Coventry Scout Band. For services to Young People.
- Gillian Patricia, Mrs. Nussey. For services to the Victim Support Service in Warwickshire.
- Brigid Christina, Mrs. O'Connor, Senior Nurse, Royal Gwent Hospital. For services to Urology.
- Sean Michael Barry O'Meara, Chair, Finance and Management Committee, Royal Society for the Prevention of Accidents. For services to Accident Prevention.
- John Francis O'Neill, Executive Officer, Pensions Service, Department for Work and Pensions.
- Andrew Joseph O'Sullivan, B.E.M. For charitable services in Rochdale, Greater Manchester.
- Wilfred Alec Osborn, Chair of Governors, Deacon's School, Peterborough. For services to Education.
- Elaine, Mrs. Parker. For services to the community in Foleshill, Coventry.
- Stuart Parker. For services to the community in Foleshill, Coventry.
- Ms Angela Parks, Operational Manager, Coventry Youth Offending Service. For services to Youth Justice.
- Roger William Kew Parlby, Editor-in-Chief and Managing Director, Newark Advertiser. For services to the Newspaper Industry and to the community in Nottinghamshire.
- John Lewis Partridge. For services to the Royal British Legion in Kent.
- David Pascoe. For services to the community in Redruth, Cornwall.
- Alice, Mrs. Pashley. For services to the community in Belton, Lincolnshire.
- Dr. Raina Patel. For services to Healthcare in Stockport, Cheshire.
- Gillian, Mrs. Pearce, Executive Officer, Jobcentre Plus, Department for Work and Pensions.
- Kenneth Gerald Pearce. For services to the community in High Wycombe, Buckinghamshire.
- Pamela, Mrs. Pearce, Higher Executive Officer, Child Support Agency.
- Christine, Mrs. Percival, Director, University of Strathclyde Summer Academy. For services to Higher Education.
- Arthur Robert Peters. For services to the community in Ringmer, East Sussex.
- Keith Gordon Phipps, Geography Teacher, King Edward VI Camp Hill School for Boys, Birmingham. For services to Education.
- Kenneth Andrew Pink, Senior Coxswain, Gosport and Fareham Inshore Rescue Services. For services to the community in Hampshire.
- Edward Frederick Robert Pluck, Honorary Secretary, Wanstead Cricket Club. For services to Cricket in Essex.
- Dr. Mark Christopher Milsom Porter, Broadcaster and General Medical Practitioner, Stroud, Gloucestershire. For services to Healthcare.
- Nellie Elizabeth, Mrs. Porter. For services to the community in Box, Wiltshire.
- Philip Sparkman Powell. For services to the Royal British Legion in Herefordshire.
- The Reverend Jemima Prasadam. For services to Inter-faith Relations.
- Sharon Joy, Mrs. Price. For services to Swimming in Torfaen, South Wales.
- Roger Priest. For services to the community in Aylesbury, Buckinghamshire.
- Richard Priss, Project Engineer, BAE Systems. For services to the Defence Industry.
- Robert Pryde. For services to the Scottish Ambulance Service, Kinross, Perthshire.
- Charles Pude. For services to the community in Porton, Wiltshire.
- Ms Dahlia Eunelvia Hendrickson-Quailey, Constable, Bedfordshire Police, For services to the Police.
- Michael William Quigley. For services to the Bassetlaw Hospice of the Good Shepherd and to the community in Retford, Nottinghamshire.
- The Reverend George Bruce Quinn. For services to the Isle of Man.
- Gwendoline Yvonne, Mrs. Raggett. For services to the community in Bournemouth.
- Rahmat Ali Raja. For services to the community in Pendle, Lancashire.
- Miss Aileen Margaret Ramsay, Personal Assistant, Edinburgh College of Art. For services to Education.
- John Leslie Rawe. For services to the community in Bishop Auckland, County Durham.
- Mansel John Raymond, Farmer. For services to Agriculture in Wales.
- Meurig David Raymond, Farmer. For services to Agriculture in Wales.
- Dr. Joseph Rea, Teacher, Aquinas Grammar School, Belfast. For services to Education.
- Elsa Jacqueline, Mrs. Redpath, Senior Secretary, Virgin Trains. For services to the Rail Industry.
- Paul Beresford Redrup, T.D., Regional Officer, The Duke of Edinburgh's Award, East Region. For services to Young People in East Anglia.
- Miss Marian Edna Reed, Chair, St. Mary's Hospice, Birmingham. For services to the community in the West Midlands.
- Roger Frederick Reeves, Deputy County Commissioner for Scouting, Wiltshire. For services to Young People.
- Thomas Renwick, Farmer. For services to the community in Cardrona, Peeblesshire.
- Ms Elen Rhys. For services to Lifelong Learning in Wales.
- Margaret Alice, Mrs. Riddell. For services to the community in Kelso.
- Keith John Ridyard, Senior Co-ordinator, Family Friends in Windsor and Maidenhead. For services to Families.
- James Charles Riley. For services to Community Relations in East London.
- Maroof, Mrs. Rishi, Foster Carer. For services to Children in Birmingham.
- David Evan Roberts. For services to Disabled Sport.
- Ms Rosemary Anne Roberts, lately Chief Copy-Editor, Oxford Dictionary of National Biography. For services to Scholarship.
- Stephen Brian Mansel Roberts. For services to The Duke of Edinburgh's Award Scheme and to the community in the Wirral, Merseyside.
- Dr. Frederick David Robinson, lately Teacher and Key Stage 3 Manager, Queensbury School, Bradford. For services to Education.
- David Alexander Rodger, lately Director, Hebridean Island Cruises. For services to Shipping.
- Christine, Mrs. Rodstrom, Senior Officer, H.M. Prison and Young Offenders Institution, Bulwood Hall, Essex.
- Genek Crammond Romanowski, Local Office Manager, Inland Revenue.
- Francis Rothwell, J.P. For services to the community in Leigh, Lancashire.
- Elizabeth Ann, Mrs. Rowland. For services to disabled people through the Willow Trust in Cirencester, Gloucestershire.
- Iorwerth Rowlands. For services to the community in Beaumaris, Anglesey.
- Derek Roy, Chargehand, Grounds Maintenance, Harrow Council. For services to the community in Harrow, Middlesex.
- Tom Royle, Trade Union Representative, MBDA UK. For services to the Defence Industry.
- Elaine Anne, Mrs. Ruse, Propriety Adviser, Revenue Finance, Inland Revenue.
- Ann Bruce, Mrs. Rushforth, Chief Executive, Scotnursing Ltd. For services to Business in Dunbartonshire.
- Malik Mohammed Salim. For services to Inter-faith Relations and to the community in Leicester.
- Miss Judith Sandland, Teacher, Leighswood Primary School, Walsall, West Midlands. For services to Education.
- Graham Russell Sandy. For services to Young People through the Frenford Clubs and the Hainault and Clayhall Cricket Club in Essex.
- Reginald John Saville. For services to Museums and to the community in Langton Matravers, Isle of Purbeck, Dorset.
- Miss Norma Elizabeth Scott, Grade E1, Ministry of Defence.
- John Sydney Sedgwick, J.P. For services to the community in Liverpool.
- Gurdial Singh Seehra. For services to Young People in Woolwich, London.
- Frederick Barry Hilton Sergeant. For services to the Law Courts in Jersey.
- Stewart Sharp, Executive Officer, Jobcentre Plus, Department for Work and Pensions.
- Carole Ann, Mrs. Shaves. For services to the Victim Support Service in East Sussex.
- Phillip James Shepherd, Forest Craftsman, Rhondda. For services to Forestry and to Archaeology in Wales.
- Anthony Sheppard, Head of Physical Education Training, H.M. Prison Service College, Lilleshall, Shropshire.
- Yinka Shonibare. For services to Art.
- Stephen Anthony Silk, Metal Detail and Process Manager, Marshall Aerospace. For services to the Aerospace Industry.
- John Martin Simms. For services to Linen Hall Library and to the community in Northern Ireland.
- Melody Jane, Mrs. Simons. For services to the community in Enfield, London.
- Joseph Gilbert Simpson. For services to the Fishing Industry in Scotland.
- Eric Thurston Slape, Canoeing and Sailing Instructor and Member, Hertfordshire Scouts and Guides Canoeing Committee. For services to Young People.
- Sheila Mary, Mrs. Slape, Guider-in-Charge, Bentley Heath Campsite and Holiday Home, Hertfordshire. For services to Young People.
- Christina, Mrs. Smith. For charitable services in Preston, Lancashire.
- Eleanor, Mrs. Smith, J.P. For services to the community in Gateshead.
- Jean Mary, Mrs. Smith. For charitable services in Essex.
- Marina Helen, Mrs. Smith, Education Director, Beth Shalom Holocaust Educational Centre. For services to Community Relations.
- Nigel Smith, Constable, West Midlands Police. For services to the Police.
- Barry Keith Smitherman. For services to Animal Welfare.
- June, Mrs. Smitherman. For services to Animal Welfare.
- Margaret Taylor, Mrs. Sneddon. For services to the Girls' Brigade, Wishaw and Shotts, Lanarkshire.
- Elsie Mary, Mrs. Sollis. For services to the community in Kingham, Oxfordshire.
- John Edward Speed, lately Leading Ranger, Ludlow, Forestry Commission.
- Gareth Arthur Stacey, J.P. For services to Young People and to the community in Hove, East Sussex.
- Nicholas Stanbury, Grade C1, Ministry of Defence.
- Gail Simpson, Mrs. Stanley, J.P., D.L. For services to the community in Ormskirk, Lancashire.
- Gary Stannett, Youth Worker. For services to Young People in Southwark, London.
- Kenneth Stephens. For services to the Royal Air Forces Association in Gwynedd.
- Hugh Sterrett, Senior Attendant, Knockbreda Cemetery, Castlereagh Borough Council. For services to Local Government.
- John Bernard Stiff, Dog Handler, H.M. Prison Full Sutton, North Yorkshire.
- David Vincent Stipetic, Clock Custodian and Consultant, Kingston-upon-Hull City Council. For services to Local Government.
- Wendy Joyce, Mrs. Stirling, Grade A3, Education Department, Scottish Executive.
- George Robson Stobbs, Q.P.M. For services to the Scout Association in Dumfries and Galloway.
- Frances, Mrs. Stone, Teaching Assistant, Hambleton Church of England Primary School, Hambleton, Selby, North Yorkshire. For services to Education.
- The Reverend George Malcolm Stonestreet. For services to the community in Cumbria.
- Miss Susan Strickland. For services to Homeless People in Bristol.
- Graeme Alexander Stuart, Policy Adviser, Education Department, Scottish Executive.
- Alexander Swailes. For services to the community in Northumberland.
- Lorraine, Mrs. Sweeney, Grade E1, Ministry of Defence.
- Mary Elizabeth Joan, Mrs. Taggart, Social Security Officer, Operations Division, Social Security Agency, Department for Social Development, Northern Ireland Executive.
- Christine Shinn, Mrs. Taylor, lately Adviser to the Department for Education and Skills. For services to Early Years Education.
- Gillian, Mrs. Tee, Voluntary Teaching Assistant, Old Stratford Community Primary School, Milton Keynes. For services to Education.
- Gillian Rosamund, Mrs. Temple. For services to Education and to the community in East Sussex.
- Miss Patricia Tennant, Employee Assistance Officer, H.M. Customs and Excise.
- Jean, Mrs. Thompson, Principal Trainer, Lay Led Self Management Programmes. For services to Healthcare.
- Sarah Sylvia, Mrs. Thompson. For services to the community in Bristol.
- John Victor Thorp, Civic Architect, Leeds City Council. For services to Architecture.
- Dr. Morag Kennedy Thow, Lecturer in Physiotherapy, Glasgow Caledonian University. For services to Healthcare.
- Gwilym Thomas Tibbott, Councillor, Powys County Council. For services to the community in Powys.
- Ms Ruth Mary Till, Director, Rubicon Dance. For services to Community Dance.
- Robert Philip Tilt, J.P. For services to the Administration of Justice.
- Brian John Tomlinson, Managing Director, Springpart Manufacturing Limited. For services to InternationalmTrade.
- Major David Redvers Walter Tovell. For services to the Soldiers', Sailors' and Airmen's Families Association in Dorset.
- Margaret Anne, Mrs. Tranmer, Foster Carer and Carers' Representative. For services to Children and to Families in Rotherham, South Yorkshire.
- John Travis. For services to the community in Lancashire.
- Ms June Trimble, Vice-Chair, Youth Net. For services to Young People in Northern Ireland.
- Leslie William Charles Truman. For services to Homeless People through The Passage in Victoria, London and to the community in Bexley, Kent.
- Christine Anne, Mrs. Turner, Member, Tendring District Council. For services to the community in Walton-on-Naze, Essex.
- David Michael Turner, District Officer, South Yorkshire Constabulary. For services to the Police. Michael Colin Turvey. For services to Music and to the community in Pinner, Middlesex.
- Andrew Harwood Vernon. For services to disabled people.
- Donald Arthur Vickers, Recreation and Business Development Team Leader, Environment Agency. For services to the Environment and to UK Athletics.
- Gerard Vignola, lately Tenant Adviser, Hammersmith and Fulham Federation of Tenants' and Residents' Associations. For services to Social Housing in London.
- Hedley William Pierre Vinall. For services to the Burma Star Association.
- Stephen Wade, Director, Learning Disability Services, Bro Morgannwg NHS Trust. For services to the NHS.
- Cherry Annabella, Mrs. Waite. For services to the Duchy Opera Trust and to the community in Cornwall.
- Peter Andrew Durham-Waite. For services to the community in Jersey.
- Archibald Walker, Vice President Operations, KBR Government Operations. For services to the Defence Industry.
- George Eric Walker, lately Director, Corporate Services, West Dunbartonshire Council. For services to Local Government.
- George Wilfrid Walker. For services to the community in Lund, East Yorkshire.
- Dr. John Edward Stuart Walker, Founder Hornsea Museum. For services to the community and Museums in the East Riding of Yorkshire.
- Miss Judith Anne Walker, Administrative Officer (Dentistry), Education Directorate, Barts and the London Queen Mary's School of Medicine and Dentistry. For services to Higher Education.
- Andrew William Wall. For services to the Bangladeshi community in Birmingham.
- Harry Graham Wallace. For services to the Catholic Agency for Overseas Development.
- Edward Walledge, Shares Valuation Examiner, Inland Revenue.
- Rosemary Teresa, Mrs. Walley. For services to the community in Thorncombe, Dorset.
- Angeline Mary Anne, Mrs. Walters, Community Contact Officer, Cambridgeshire Constabulary. For services to the Police.
- Sidney Myer Wander. For services to the community in Manchester.
- Brian Clifford Warren. For services to Agriculture in Devon.
- Stanley Wilson Waterfall. For services to the community in Leigh, Dorset.
- Harold Godfrey Watson. For services to the community in County Durham.
- Lieutenant Colonel Andrew James John Watt. For services to the Gurkha Regiments.
- Graham Norman Webb. For services to Business and to Charity in Kent.
- Ms Sarah Kate Webb. For services to Sailing.
- Victoria, Mrs. Weekes, Chair, Port Talbot League of Friends. For services to Healthcare in Neath, Port Talbot.
- David Welch, Executive Officer, Jobcentre Plus, Department for Work and Pensions.
- Jane Elizabeth, Mrs. West, Registrar and Training Officer, Lincolnshire Registration Service. For services to the Civil Registration Service.
- William Andrew Whannell, Station Manager, Vehicle and Operator Services Agency.
- Alanda Joy, Mrs. Whitehead. For services to the community in Leicestershire.
- Sian, Mrs. Whiteley, Teacher and Leader of Adult Basic Skills, North Warwickshire and Hinckley College. For services to Adult Basic Skills.
- Nora, Mrs. Whitham, Nurse Educationalist, West Yorkshire NHS Workforce Development Confederation. For services to Nursing and to the community in Bradford.
- Bryan Whittaker. For services to Health and Safety in the Engineering Industry.
- Dr. Margaret Whoriskey, lately Commissioner, Mental Welfare Commission for Scotland. For services to Mental Health and to Disabled People.
- Margaret, Mrs. Wilkin, District Officer, Special Constabulary. For services to the Police.
- Miss Susan Wilkinson, Administrative Officer, Jobcentre Plus, Department for Work and Pensions.
- Jacqueline Maeve, Mrs. Willems, Technical Support Officer, Environment Agency. For services to the Environment.
- Bleddyn Llewellyn Williams. For services to Sport in Wales.
- Robert Stanley Williams, Probation Officer. For services to the National Probation Service in Devon and Cornwall.
- Stephen David Williams, Rower. For services to Sport.
- Barbara, Mrs. Wilson, Chair, Friends of Coalshaw Green Park. For services to the community in Oldham, Greater Manchester.
- Miss Jean Wilson, Head of Science, Blackpool and The Fylde College. For services to Biology.
- Miss Lesley Ann Wilson, Social Work Practice Team Manager. For services to Social Care in Edinburgh.
- Ms Lorraine Wilson, Executive Officer, National Assembly for Wales.
- Miss Marion Wilson, Typist, Department for the Environment, Food and Rural AVairs.
- Major Richard George Wilson. For services to the Soldiers', Sailors' and Airmen's Families Association in Norfolk.
- Ronald Angus Wilson, Managing Director, Wilson's Country Ltd, Armagh. For services to the Food Processing Industry and to Charity.
- Nobby Woodcock. For services to Football in Bettws, Newport, Gwent.
- George Ralston Wyllie, Sculptor. For services to Art.
- Patricia, Mrs. Wyndham, Founder, 999 Clubs Trust. For services to the community in South East London.
- Dr. Lesley Yellowlees, Reader in Chemistry, University of Edinburgh. For services to Science.
- Keith Yorke, Grade C2, Ministry of Defence.

== Barbados ==
=== Order of Saint Michael and Saint George ===
==== Knight Commander of The Order of Saint Michael and Saint George (KCMG) ====
- Allan Clifford Fields. For services to the Barbados private sector.

=== Order of the British Empire ===
==== Commander of The Order of the British Empire (CBE) ====
- Arthur Rudolph Edghill. For services to health care.
- Elkins Leroy Ward. For services to agriculture.

==== Officer of The Order of the British Empire (OBE) ====
- Donna Charmaine Symmonds. For services to sport.

==== Member of The Order of the British Empire (MBE) ====
- Patricia Angela, Mrs. Layne. For services as Private Secretary to the Governor-General.
- John Howard Spencer. For services to the community.

== Grenada ==
=== Order of Saint Michael and Saint George ===
==== Knight Commander of The Order of Saint Michael and Saint George (KCMG) ====
- Royston Oliver Hopkin, C.M.G. For services to the tourism industry.

== Papua New Guinea ==
=== Knight Bachelor ===
- Lucas Joseph Waka, O.B.E. For services to politics.

=== Order of Saint Michael and Saint George ===
==== Knight Commander of The Order of Saint Michael and Saint George (KCMG) ====
- The Honourable William Jack Skate, C.M.G. For services to Papua New Guinea.

==== Companion of The Order of Saint Michael and Saint George (CMG) ====
- Obed Boas. For services to politics and the community.

=== Order of the British Empire ===
==== Dame Commander of The Order of the British Empire (DBE) ====
- The Honourable Carol, Lady Kidu, M.P. For services to the community and politics.

=== Commander of The Order of the British Empire (CBE) ===
- John Francis Kaupa. For services to commerce and industry.

=== Officer of The Order of the British Empire (OBE) ===
- Kioso Abija. For services to the community.
- Bernard Fong. For services to commerce and sport.
- Joseph Gabut. For public service.
- Allan John Hooper. For services to the community and to education.
- John Pomoh Kambuou. For services to sports administration.
- The Reverend Samson Kaveu Lowa. For services to religion.
- John Wagalia Malisa, I.S.O. For public service and broadcasting.
- Celia Mary Naoni. For services to health and the community.

=== Member of The Order of the British Empire (MBE) ===
==== Military Division ====
- Lieutenant Colonel Kerry Raga Ragagalo, Papua New Guinea Defence Force.

==== Civil Division ====
- Togi Ted Bao. For public service.
- Lohia Bogagu. For services to the community.
- Chief Pilot Leonard Michael Cleaver. For services to the aviation industry and the government.
- Mathias Dogia. For services to local government affairs. *Jessie Griffiths. For public service.
- Airi Gunu. For services to nursing.
- Barbara Mimino. For services to the Department of Foreign Affairs.
- Francis Muriki. For public service.
- Richard Tamari Nagai. For services to sport and the community.
- Wai Onum. For services to the people of Anglimp. Councillor *Morea Lahui Sere. For public service.
- Iava Sioa. For services to politics and the community. Miss *Ludwina Umba. For services to nursing.
- Emie Kavanamuir Wari. For services to the business sector in Chartered Accounting.
- Andrew Wauwia. For services to the Royal Papua New Guinea Constabulary.

=== Imperial Service Order (ISO) ===
- Theo Illihi. For services to health.

=== British Empire Medal (BEM) ===
==== Military Division ====
- Warrant Officer Jack Palme, Papua New Guinea Defence Force.

==== Civil Division ====
- Lake Ahoba. For public service and forest plantation development.
- The Reverend Morehari Ako. For services to the church.
- Isu Aluvula. For services to the public and the church. *Councillor Tanti Raka’ Ani Doura. For services to the public and the community.
- Robert Sippy Pou Fareho. For public service.
- Vincent Gorogo. For services to Customs and Government.
- Apere Goso. For services to the community, the church and business.
- Bonnie Iara. For services to nursing.
- Kevin Kasimbua. For services to the business sector and the government.
- Senior Sergeant David Diebu Kewere. For services to the Royal Papua New Guinea Constabulary.
- Chief Sergeant Timmeaus Korada. For services to the Royal Papua New Guinea Constabulary.
- Mirem Maginberem. For services to nursing.
- Joel Mewanda. For services to the community.
- Edith Nombo. For services to nursing.
- Lucas David Poka. For services to the church and the community.
- Siava Rei. For services to nursing.
- Councillor Opao Fo’o Udia. For public service.
- Awateng Vodok Vek. For services to the community.
- Noel Edward Thomas Williams. For services to the community.
- Councillor Mano Wipai. For services to Papua New Guinea.

== Solomon Islands ==
=== Knight Bachelor ===
- Thomas Kok Chan, O.B.E. For services to the social and economic development of the Solomon Islands.
- Chief Justice Albert Rocky Palmer. On his appointment as Chief Justice.*

=== Order of Saint Michael and Saint George ===
==== Knight Grand Cross of The Order of Saint Michael and Saint George (GCMG) ====
- Nathaniel Rahumaea Waena. On his appointment as Governor-General of the Solomon Islands

=== Order of the British Empire ===
==== Officer of The Order of the British Empire (OBE) ====
- David Sitai. For services to national politics and the public.

==== Member of The Order of the British Empire (MBE) ====
- John Henry Howden Beverly. For services to commerce and the community.
- George Cheuk Ping Tong. For services to the economic development of the Solomon Islands.

== Tuvalu ==
=== Order of the British Empire ===
==== Officer of The Order of the British Empire (OBE) ====
- Enele Sopoaga. For public and community service.

==== Member of The Order of the British Empire (MBE) ====
- Malaki Mauga. For services to the community.
- Sala Niuatui. For public and community service.
- Pepeuga Vaelei. For public and community service.

=== British Empire Medal (BEM) ===
- Maleko Apelaamo. For services to the community.
- Matini Fousaga. For services to the community.
- Peni Liai. For services to the community.

== Saint Lucia ==
=== Order of Saint Michael and Saint George ===
==== Knight Commander of The Order of Saint Michael and Saint George (KCMG) ====
- The Right Honourable Allan Fitzgerald Laurent Louisy, C.B.E. For services to the judiciary.

== St Vincent and the Grenadines ==
=== Order of Saint Michael and Saint George ===
==== Companion of The Order of Saint Michael and Saint George (CMG) ====
- Monica Jessie Dacon. For services to teaching and public administration.

=== Order of the British Empire ===
==== Officer of The Order of the British Empire (OBE) ====
- Basil Stanley Charles. For services to business and the community.
- Gurney Alexander Gibson. For services to the construction industry.

==== Member of The Order of the British Empire (MBE) ====
- Laura Dianna Anthony-Browne. For services to the public and to national planning.
- Marcus Alonzo Caine. For services to education.
- Eulalie Theodora Cozier. For services to nursing.

== Belize ==
=== Order of the British Empire ===
==== Commander of The Order of the British Empire (CBE) ====
- Emory King. For services to Belizean culture and the community.

==== Member of The Order of the British Empire (MBE) ====
- Joy Charley. For services in the field of medical technology.
- Arun Hotchandani. For services to business and commerce.
- Hazel, Hutchinson. For services to the community through the Red Cross, Guides, and helping the elderly.

== Saint Christopher and Nevis ==
=== Order of Saint Michael and Saint George ===
==== Companion of The Order of Saint Michael and Saint George (CMG) ====
- Kutayba Yusuf Alghanim. For services to the economic development of St. Kitts and Nevis.

=== Order of the British Empire ===
==== Officer of The Order of the British Empire (OBE) ====
- Dr. Keith Alexis Eustace Archibald. For services to agriculture.

==== Member of The Order of the British Empire (MBE) ====
- Peter Ian Hugh Mallalieu. For services to industry and commerce.
- Dr. Laughton Cecil Richardson. For services to medicine.
