= Mary MacDonald =

Mary MacDonald may refer to:

- Mary MacDonald (poet) (1789–1872), Scottish Gaelic poet and hymn writer
- Mary Macdonald (born 1950), British schoolteacher and headmistress
- Mary Marjory MacDonald (1884–1926), known as 'the Scottish Queen of Thieves'
- Mary Florence MacDonald (1984–2017), Canadian artist and curator

== See also ==
- Mary McDonald (disambiguation)
