= Robert Glover =

Robert or Robbie Glover may refer to:

- Robert Glover (martyr) (died 1555), English Protestant martyr burnt to death for heresy
- Robert Glover (officer of arms) (1544–1588), Somerset herald in the reign of Elizabeth I
- Robert Glover (pirate) (died 1698), pirate captain active in the Red Sea
- Robert E. Glover (1896–1984), American engineer
- Robert W. Glover (1866–1956), Baptist pastor and politician in Arkansas
- Robert Mark Glover, founder and executive director of the UK children's charity Care for Children
- Robert Mortimer Glover (1815–1859), British physician
- Robbie Glover (singer), UK singer/songwriter
- Robbie Glover, character in Dirk Gently, played by Tony Pitts
