= Ludger Johannes =

French-German biochemist (born 1966)

Ludger Johannes (born February 17, 1966) is a French-German biochemist who has specialized in the field of endocytosis and intracellular trafficking. He and his team study how sugars attached to proteins or lipids influence the transport of biological material into eukaryotic cells.

Johannes is research director “classe exceptionnelle” (DRE) at the Institut Nationale de la Santé et de la Recherche Médicale (INSERM, where he was recruited in 1997. He currently directs the Cellular and Chemical Biology department (U1143 INSERM – UMR3666 CNRS) at Institut Curie in Paris, France. He is an elected member of the European Molecular Biology Organization (EMBO), and German Academy of Sciences Leopoldina and an alumnus of the Germany-based Boehringer Ingelheim Fonds – Foundation for Basic Research in Medicine and the German Academic Scholarship Foundation Studienstiftung des deutschen Volkes.

== Education ==
During his undergraduate biochemistry studies at the University of Bayreuth, Germany, Ludger Johannes spent 1 year from 1990 to 1991 in the team of Heinz Arnheiter at the National Institutes of Health in Bethesda, USA. In February 1993, he earned his diploma in biochemistry. He started his PhD work in March 1993 under François Darchen at the Institut de biologie physico-chimique in Paris, France. After the PhD viva in October 1995, he moved to Institut Curie in Paris to the team of Bruno Goud, where he worked as a post-doctoral fellow until 1997. In 2001, he received the habilitation to direct research.

== Professional experience ==
Johannes joined INSERM 1997 as a staff scientist. In 2001, he became team leader in its Compartmentalization and Cellular Dynamics unit (UMR144 CNRS), and in 2014 the director of the Cellular and Chemical Biology unit (U1143 INSERM – UMR3666 CNRS) at Institut Curie.

He served 4 years (2008-2012) as a member of the bureau of study section 23 (cell biology) of CNRS for the recruitment of staff scientists and the evaluation of researchers and research units, and 4 years (2012-2016) on the equivalent commission CSS3 of INSERM. He served on international review boards, including the Human Frontier Science Program (HFSP) Organization fellowship committee (2008-2011). He obtained national, European and intercontinental grant support, including an Advanced Grant of the European Research Council (ERC) (2014-2020) and 2 Human Frontier Science Program grants (2007–2011 and 2014–2018).

In the past Johannes created 2 biotech companies: ShigaMediX and STxB Pharma Technologies.

== Research ==
Johannes’ research aims at establishing fundamental concepts of endocytosis and intracellular trafficking. His team has made two major contributions in this context: the discovery of a membrane trafficking interface between early endosomes and the Golgi apparatus, and the demonstration that dynamic lectin-induced glycosphingolipid reorganization acts as a driving force for endocytic pit construction in clathrin-independent endocytosis. He also aims at exploiting his discoveries in fundamental membrane biology research for the development of cancer therapy strategies. His team has validated the B-subunit of Shiga toxin (STxB) as a "pilot" for the delivery of therapeutic compounds to precise intracellular locations of dendritic cells for immunotherapy, and tumors for targeted therapy

== Awards ==
- 1988: Fellowship by the Studienstiftung des deutschen Volkes (German sponsorship organization for the academically gifted, promoting excellence, funding, scholars)
- 1993-1995: PhD Fellowship of the Boehringer Ingelheim Fonds – Foundation for Basic Research in Medicine
- 1995-1997: BASF Forschungsprogramm Post-Doc Program
- 2012: Elected as member of the European Molecular Biology Organization (EMBO)
- 2014-2020: European Research Council (ERC) advanced grant
- 2019: Elected as member of the German National Academy of Sciences – Leopoldina

== Publications ==
- Forrester A, Rathjen SJ, Garcia Castillo MD, Bachert C, Couhert A, Tepshi L, Pichard S, Martinez J, Renard H-F, Valades Cruz CA, Dingli F, Loew D, Lamaze C, Cintrat JC, Linstedt AD, Gillet D, Barbier J, Johannes L (2020) Functional dissection of the retrograde Shiga toxin trafficking inhibitor Retro-2. Nat Chem Biol 16: 327–336. Comments: Hesso Farhan, Nature Chemical Biology volume 16, pages 229–230 (2020)
- Watkins EB, Majewski J, Chi EY, Gao H, Florent JC, Johannes L (2019) Shiga toxin induces lipid compression: a mechanism for generating membrane curvature. Nano Lett 19: 7365-7369
- Johannes L, Pezeshkian W, Ipsen JH, Shillcock J (2018) Clustering on membranes – Fluctuations and more. Trends Cell Biol 28: 405-415
- Pezeshkian& W, Gao&# H, Arumugam&# S, Becken# U, Bassereau P, Florent JC, Ipsen* JH, Johannes* L, Shillcock* J (2017) Mechanism of Shiga toxin clustering on membranes. ACS Nano 11: 314-324 (& co-first authors, # authors from Johannes group, * principal investigators and corresponding authors). Comments: Forces at play: A new infection route for bacteria
- Shafaq-Zadah M, Gomes-Santos CS, Bardin S, Maiuri P, Maurin M, Iranzo J, Gautreau A, Lamaze C, Caswell P, Goud B, Johannes L (2016) Persistent cell migration and adhesion rely on retrograde transport of beta1 integrin. Nat Cell Biol 18: 54–64.
- Bhatia# D, Arumugam# S, Nasilowski M, Joshi H, Wunder# C, Chambon# V, (...), Johannes* L, Dubertret* B, Krishnan* Y (2016) Quantum dot-loaded monofunctionalized DNA Icosahedra for single particle tracking of endocytic pathways. Nat Nanotechnol 11: 1112-1119 (* corresponding authors and principal investigators; # authors from Johannes team). Comments: Nature Biotechology, 2016, Vol. 34, number 10, page 1036
- Renard H-F, Simunovic M, Lemière J, Boucrot E, Garcia-Castillo MD, Arumugam S, Chambon V, Lamaze C, Wunder C, Kenworthy AK, Schmidt AA, McMahon H, Sykes C, Bassereau P, Johannes L (2015) Endophilin-A2 functions in membrane scission in clathrin-independent endocytosis. Nature 517: 493–496. Comments: Nature News and Views: Haucke V, 2015, Nature 517: 446–447; Nat Rev Mol Cell Biol, published online 15 January 2015; 16(2): 68; F
- Johannes L, Parton RG, Bassereau P, and Mayor S (2015) Building endocytic pits without clathrin. Nat Rev Mol Cell Biol 16: 311-321
- Lakshminarayan R, Wunder C, Becken U, Howes MT, Benzing C, Arumugam S, Sales S, Ariotti N, Chambon V, Lamaze C, Loew D, Shevchenko A, Gaus K, Parton RG, Johannes L (2014) Galectin-3 drives glycosphingolipid-dependent biogenesis of clathrin-independent carriers. Nat Cell Biol 16: 595–606. Comments: Nat Cell Biol, June 2014, Volume 16 No 6 pp506–507; Nat Rev Mol Cell Biol, published online 11 June 2014; Science Editor's Choice 2014, VOL 344, ISSUE 6188, PAGE 1129
- Römer W, Pontani LL, Sorre B, Rentero C, Berland L, Chambon V, Lamaze C, Bassereau P, Sykes C, Gaus K, Johannes L (2010) Actin dynamics drive membrane reorganization and scission in clathrin-independent endocytosis. Cell 140: 540–553. Comments: Cell Video abstract
- Stechmann# B, Bai# SK, Gobbo E, Lopez R, Merer G, Pinchard S, Panigai L, Tenza D, Raposo G, Beaumelle B, Sauvaire D, Gillet* D, Johannes* L, Barbier J (2010) Inhibition of retrograde transport protects mice from lethal ricin challenges. Cell 141: 231-242 (* corresponding authors, # authors from Johannes team). Comments: Seaman and Peden, 2010, Cell 141: 222–224; Nature 2010, Vol 464, page 1106; Science editor's choice Volume 328, Number 5981, Issue of 21 May 2010
- Ewers, H., Römer W, Smith AE, Bacia K, Dmitrieff S, Chai W, Mancini R, Kartenbeck J, Chambon V, Berland L, Oppenheim A, Schwarzmann G, Feizi T, Schwille P, Sens P, Helenius A, and Johannes L (2010) GM1 structure determines SV40-induced membrane invagination and infection. Nat Cell Biol 12: 11–18. Comments: Nat Rev Mol Cell Biol 2010 Vol 8, pp 87
- Römer W, Berland L, Chambon V, Gaus K, Windschiegl B, Tenza D, Aly MR, Fraisier V, Florent JC, Perrais D, Lamaze C, Raposo G, Steinem C, Sens P, Bassereau P, and Johannes L (2007) Shiga toxin induces tubular membrane invaginations for its uptake into cells. Nature 450: 670–675. Comments: Nat Rev Mol Cell Biol 2008 Vol 9, pp 2; Nat Rev Microbiol 2008 Vol 6, pp 92; F d
- Mallard F, Tang BL, Galli T, Tenza D, Saint-Pol A, Yue X, Antony C, Hong WJ, Goud B, Johannes L (2002) Early/recycling endosomes-to-TGN transport involves two SNARE complexes and a Rab6 isoform. J Cell Biol 156: 653–664
