= Brian Lord (cyber security expert) =

Former deputy director of GCHQ in Cheltenham, England (born 1965)

Brian Lord OBE
- Born: December 1965 (age 60); Bradford
- Education: Bradford Grammar School

Brian Lord OBE (born December 1965) is the former deputy director for intelligence and cyber operations at the Government Communications Headquarters (GCHQ) in Cheltenham, England. As of 2020, he is CEO at Protection Group International, an international consultancy specialising in helping organisations build digital resilience.

== Early life ==
Brian Lord was born in Bradford in December 1965, he is the son of a computer programmer and a teacher of mathematics and was educated at Bradford Grammar School (1972–1984).

== Career ==
Lord worked for GCHQ for 21 years before leaving as deputy director for intelligence and cyber operations. He was awarded the OBE in the 2005 New Year Honours. In September 2013, he joined PGI Protection Group International, a consultancy specialising in cyber security and risk consulting, where he held the role of managing director, cyber and he is now CEO. He has been described by The Telegraph as a "leading thinker in the sector of cyber warfare".

In October 2017, Lord was cleared of a charge of sexual assault at Gloucester Crown Court after prosecutors did not present any evidence, but did plead guilty to common assault after placing his hand on a woman's knee for 2 – 3 minutes at a party in 2016. He is believed to be the first person in British legal history to be charged with common assault with the particulars being "Assault by touching [the defendant] on her knee." According to his lawyer, three judges had questioned whether it was in the public interest to continue with the case in view of its "minor nature".
