= Donnai–Barrow syndrome =

- Donnai–Barrow syndrome is inherited in an autosomal recessive manner.
- Specialty: Medical genetics

Donnai–Barrow syndrome is a genetic disorder first described by Dian Donnai and Margaret Barrow in 1993. It is associated with LRP2. It is an inherited (genetic) disorder that affects many parts of the body.

== Presentation ==
This disorder is characterized by unusual facial features, including prominent, wide-set eyes with outer corners that point downward; a short bulbous nose with a flat nasal bridge; ears that are rotated backward; and a widow's peak hairline.

Individuals with Donnai–Barrow syndrome have severe hearing loss caused by abnormalities of the inner ear (sensorineural hearing loss). In addition, they often experience vision problems, including extreme nearsightedness (high myopia), detachment or deterioration of the light-sensitive tissue in the back of the eye (the retina), and progressive vision loss. Some have a gap or split in the colored part of the eye (iris coloboma).

In almost all people with Donnai–Barrow syndrome, the tissue connecting the left and right halves of the brain (corpus callosum) is underdeveloped or absent. Affected individuals may also have other structural abnormalities of the brain. They generally have mild to moderate intellectual disability and developmental delay.

People with Donnai–Barrow syndrome may also have a hole in the muscle that separates the abdomen from the chest cavity (the diaphragm), which is called a diaphragmatic hernia. This potentially serious birth defect allows the stomach and intestines to move into the chest and possibly crowd the developing heart and lungs. An opening in the wall of the abdomen (an omphalocele) that allows the abdominal organs to protrude through the navel may also occur in affected individuals. Occasionally people with Donnai–Barrow syndrome have abnormalities of the intestine, heart, or other organs and scoliosis.

== Causes ==
Mutations in the LRP2 gene cause Donnai–Barrow syndrome. The LRP2 gene provides instructions for making a protein called megalin, which functions as a receptor. Receptor proteins have specific sites into which certain other proteins, called ligands, fit like keys into locks. Together, ligands and their receptors trigger signals that affect cell development and function. Megalin has many ligands involved in various body processes, including the absorption of vitamins A and D, immune functioning, stress response, and the transport of fats in the bloodstream.

Megalin is embedded in the membrane of cells that line the surfaces and cavities of the body (epithelial cells). The receptor helps move its ligands from the cell surface into the cell (endocytosis). It is active in the development and function of many parts of the body, including the brain and spinal cord (central nervous system), eyes, ears, lungs, intestine, reproductive system, and the small tubes in the kidneys where urine is formed (renal tubules).

LRP2 gene mutations that cause Donnai–Barrow syndrome are believed to result in the absence of functional megalin protein. The lack of functional megalin in the renal tubules causes megalin's various ligands to be excreted in the urine rather than being absorbed back into the bloodstream. The features of Donnai–Barrow syndrome are probably caused by the inability of megalin to help absorb these ligands, disruption of biochemical signaling pathways, or other effects of the nonfunctional megalin protein. However, it is unclear how these abnormalities result in the specific signs and symptoms of the disorder.

A condition previously classified as a separate disorder called facio-oculo-acoustico-renal (FOAR) syndrome has also been found to be caused by LRP2 mutations. FOAR syndrome is now considered to be the same disorder as Donnai–Barrow syndrome.

=== Inherited mutation ===
This condition is inherited in an autosomal recessive pattern, which means both copies of the gene in each cell have mutations. In almost all cases, the parents of an individual with an autosomal recessive condition each carry one copy of the mutated gene but typically do not show signs and symptoms of the condition.

One individual with Donnai–Barrow syndrome was found to have inherited both copies of the mutated gene from his father as a result of a genetic change called uniparental disomy (UPD). UPD occurs when a person receives two copies of a chromosome, or part of a chromosome, from one parent and no copies from the other parent. UPD can occur as a random event during the formation of egg or sperm cells or may happen in early fetal development.

== Diagnosis ==
Diagnosis of Donnai-Barrow syndrome is done by observation of characteristic clinical features and low-molecular-weight proteinuria, or by genetic testing.

== Epidemiology ==
Donnai–Barrow syndrome appears to be a rare disorder. A few dozen affected individuals have been reported in many regions of the world.
