= Christopher Board =

British academic and cartographer

- Occupation: Academic, cartographer
- Employer: London School of Economics
- Awards: Officer of the Order of the British Empire (For services to Cartography, 2005 New Year Honours)

Christopher Board OBE is a British cartographer and academic. Among his special interests are the histories of cartography and of military mapping in colonial South Africa.

== Career ==
Board was appointed a lecturer in geography at the London School of Economics from 1 October 1963, eventually retiring as a Senior Lecturer.

He served as chair of the UK Committee for Cartography, and of the British Cartographic Society. In 1980 he was a founder of the Charles Close Society, for the study of Ordnance Survey maps, and served as its chair for sixteen years to 2012. During his chairmanship, he almost doubled the society's membership.

He was co-organiser of the International Cartographic Association (ICA) conference in 1991. He edited the ICA Newsletter for several years from the mid-1990s. He chaired the ICA's History of Cartography Commission from 1999 to 2003, having earlier played a key role in its Commission of Cartographic Communication for seven years, after the death of its sitting chair.

His 1993 book with Peter Barber, head of maps at the British Library, Tales from the map room : fact and fiction about maps and their makers was a tie-in with the BBC television series Tales from the Map Room.

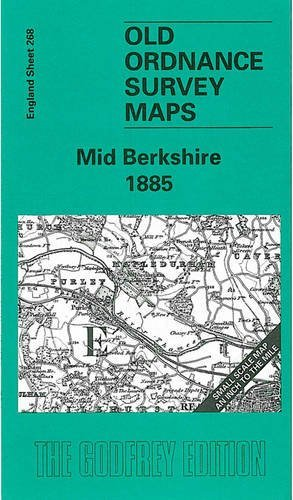
Mid Berkshire 1885, one of several Ordnance Survey map reprints by Alan Godfrey Maps for which Board wrote an introduction

He has written text introductions for several reprints of old Ordnance Survey maps, published by Alan Godfrey Maps.

== Honours ==
Board was appointed an Honorary Fellow of the International Cartographic Association in 1999, and received the British Cartographic Society Medal in September 2004.

He was appointed an Officer of the Order of the British Empire (OBE) in the 2005 New Year Honours, for services to cartography.

== Personal life ==
In 1983, Board was a contestant, partnered with a student, John Edmunds, on an episode of the television game show Treasure Hunt centred on the Forest of Dean, Gloucestershire.

== Selected papers ==
- "The Rehabilitation Programme in the Bantu Areas and Its Effect On the Agricultural Practices and Rural Life of the Bantu in the Eastern Cape". The South African Journal of Economics. 32 (1): 36–52. March 1964. doi:10.1111/j.1813-6982.1964.tb03179.x.
- "Maps as Models". In: Chorley R.J., and Haggett P. (eds.), Models in Geography. London: Methuen. 1967.
- "The secret map of the County of London, 1926, and its sequels". London Topographical Record. 27. 1995.
- "Things the maps won't show us: reflections on the impact of security issues on map design". Proceedings of the 15th International Cartographic Conference, Bournemouth, 1991. 1: 145. 1995.
- "Air photo mosaics: a short-term solution to topographic map revision in Great Britain 1944-51" (PDF). Sheetlines (71): 24–35. December 2004.
- "The British War Office 1:250,000 mapping of Cape Colony 1906-1914" (PDF). International Symposium on "Old Worlds-New Worlds": The History of Colonial Cartography 1750-1950 Utrecht University, Utrecht, the Netherlands, 21 to 23 August 2006.
- "Reflections On Three ICA Commissions" (PDF). ICA News: 10–11. September 2009.
