= Dian Donnai =

British medical geneticist

Dian Donnai CBE, FRCP, FRCOG, FMedSci
- Born: 1945 (age 80–81)
- Occupation: Medical geneticist

Dian Donnai (born 1945) is a British medical geneticist.

== Biography ==
Donnai studied at St Mary's Hospital Medical School, then trained in paediatrics at St Mary's Hospital, Northwick Park Hospital and in Sheffield.

She obtained a senior registrar training post in medical genetics at Saint Mary's Hospital, Manchester in 1978, becoming a consultant in 1980.

The University of Manchester appointed her an honorary professor of medical genetics in 1994, and gave her a substantive chair in 2001.

She served as president of the Clinical Genetics Society from 1997 to 1999; as consultant advisor to the United Kingdom's Chief Medical Officer from 1998 to 2004; and as president of the European Society of Human Genetics from 2009 2010.

Together with Margaret Barrow, she first described the genetic disorder 'Donnai–Barrow syndrome', in 1993.

She was made a Commander of the Order of the British Empire (CBE) in the 2005 New Year Honours, for services to medicine, and has also been elected a Fellow of the Royal College of Physicians (FRCP), a Fellow of the Royal College of Obstetricians and Gynaecologists "ad eundem" (FRCOG (ad eundem)), and a Fellow of the Academy of Medical Sciences (FMedSci).
