= Mary McDonald =

Mary McDonald may refer to:

- Mary McDonald (composer) (born 1956), American composer
- Mary Frances McDonald (1929–2021), Irish feminist
- Mary Lou McDonald (born 1969), Irish politician

== See also ==
- Mary MacDonald (disambiguation)
