= Alan Smith (geneticist) =

British geneticist

Alan Edward Smith CBE FRS (born 9 October 1945) is a British geneticist who was Chief Scientific Officer of Genzyme from 1996 to 2011.

He was educated at Price's School, Fareham, Christ's College, Cambridge (BA, 1967) and completed his PhD at the MRC Laboratory of Molecular Biology in 1984. He was head of the biochemistry division at the National Institute for Medical Research in Mill Hill, London from 1980 to 1984. He revealed the genome structure of SV40, a DNA virus found in both humans and monkeys which can cause tumours.

He is on the board of Arecor Therapeutics plc, and was formerly on the board of Candel Therapeutics.

He was made a CBE in the 2005 New Year Honours for services to biotechnology research and to British trade development in the USA. He was made a Fellow of the Royal Society in 2010.
