= Bernadette Porter =

British Roman Catholic nun and academic administrator

Sister Dr. Bernadette Mary Porter CBE (born 21 July 1952) is a British Roman Catholic nun, educator and academic administrator.

She was educated at Merrow Grange Grammar School (Guildford), Digby Stuart College and King's College London (BEd, 1979; PhD, 1989). She served as Vice-Chancellor, Roehampton University from 1999 to 2004, having previously held various posts at Roehampton Institute.

== Honours ==
She was appointed CBE in 2005 and is a member of the Reform Club.
