= Myaware =

British charitable organization

Myaware, formerly the Myasthenia Gravis Association is the leading UK charity for people with myasthenia gravis, congenital myasthenia, Lambert–Eaton myasthenic syndrome (LEMS) and ocular myasthenia.

== About ==
The charity was established May 1976. The charity supports people with myasthenia and their families, increase public and medical awareness of the condition and raise funds for research and support staff.

The charity’s head office is based in Derby.

== Aim ==
The organization provides information, advice and support, particularly to people just diagnosed with the conditions.
