= Robert Mark Glover =

Founder and executive director of Care for Children

Robert Glover (born 3 December 1956) is founder and executive director of the UK children's charity Care for Children. Glover also works as an advisor to the Chinese government on social welfare for disadvantaged children.

== Early life ==
Glover grew up not knowing his father, and was raised by his mother, grandmother and two sisters in Norfolk, England. He played for Norwich City football club in his youth, and later played football for Portsmouth F.C., but stopped following an injury.

== Career ==
After joining the Royal Navy, Glover went on to work for the Norfolk County Council and eventually got a degree in social work. On a trip to Shanghai with a friend, Glover was appointed by the director of Shanghai's Civil Affairs Bureau, to work with them as senior consultant in developing their child welfare system to include foster care. The charity Care for Children was registered in the UK, and Glover signed an agreement to start in 1998.

Accompanied by his wife and six children, Glover moved to Shanghai to work moving orphans and vulnerable children from institutional care into foster family care. The fostering project was launched with the objectives of 1) establishing a foster care program for children in the Shanghai state orphanage and 2) setting up a program of childcare training. After a successful pilot project, the Ministry of Civil Affairs asked Glover to move to Beijing to act as advisor to the government and help roll out the foster care program.

Following a successful pilot project, the Shanghai government awarded Glover the White Magnolia Award for outstanding services to the city. In 2005, he was awarded an OBE in Queen Elizabeth II's 2005 New Year Honours.
