= Mary Marjory MacDonald =

Scottish criminal (1884–1926)

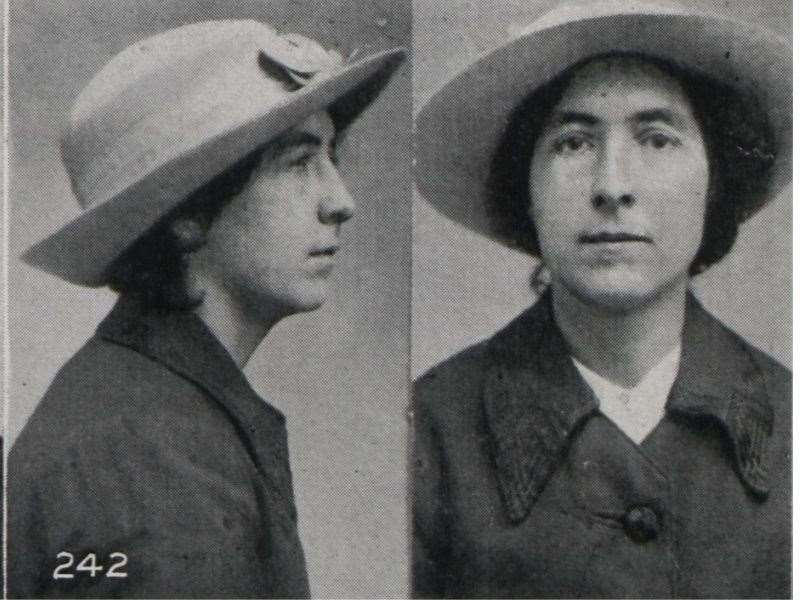
- Born: 1884; Ullapool, Scotland
- Died: 1926 (aged 41–42); London, England
- Occupation: Ladies' companion
- Known for: "the Scottish Queen of Thieves"

Mary Marjory MacDonald (1884 – October 1926) was a ladies' companion from UIlapool who became known as 'the Scottish Queen of Thieves'.

== Biography ==
Mary Marjory MacDonald was born in Ullapool in 1884. The daughter of a fish curer, she had become orphaned by the age of 15. In 1905, when she was 21 MacDonald started her first job as a companion for a woman of high society. This enabled her to surround herself with influential people which would later explain her success in blending in with her victims. She traveled extensively in this role, including in France, Switzerland and Germany, and spoke fluent French.

In 1913 she became the secretary for the London jeweller's Bellinger and Co where she committed three robberies at a number of private clubs and hotels, including the Langham Hotel and Grovenor Hotel, Victoria. On April 11, 1914, the Manchester Guardian reported a young woman of "refined appearance" was brought before the Marylebone Magistrates Court:

"Mrs. Hope, who stayed at the Grosvenor Hotel, stated that she missed from her dressing table in her bedroom, a small pearl necklace, two rings and a brooch, the value of which was £212...

a police officer said he had arrested the prisoner [MacDonald] on Wednesday night on another charge and at that time she was wearing the pearl necklace and had the two rings in her possession.

The prisoner answered the magistrate in quiet tones. "I don't think I was responsible for this," she said. "I don't think I could have been in my right mind at the time."

The judge remanded her for a week and ordered an examination by a doctor.

== Prison ==
Following this, MacDonald returned to Scotland and continued her illegal activity, stealing from several guests at hotels in Dingwall. This resulted in her first arrest at Strathpeffer train station where Mary stole a charity box from a hotel which had only 16 shillings inside, leading to a 60 day jail sentence. However, this was not her only time in prison. Mary was arrested multiple times, residing in Holloway Prison (London) and Walton Prison (Liverpool). In total, she was convicted for stealing over £4,000 in jewels and keepsakes from London and Brighton hotels, clubs and private residences and charged on 50 separate accounts for larceny.

== Death and legacy ==
She died of leukaemia in London in October 1926, aged just 42. Interestingly, instead of being labelled as a villain, she was regarded as a highly intelligent woman, hence her nickname as 'the Scottish Queen of Thieves'. This is exemplified by the fact that ladies' companion is the occupation written on her death certificate.
