= Patrick Holden =

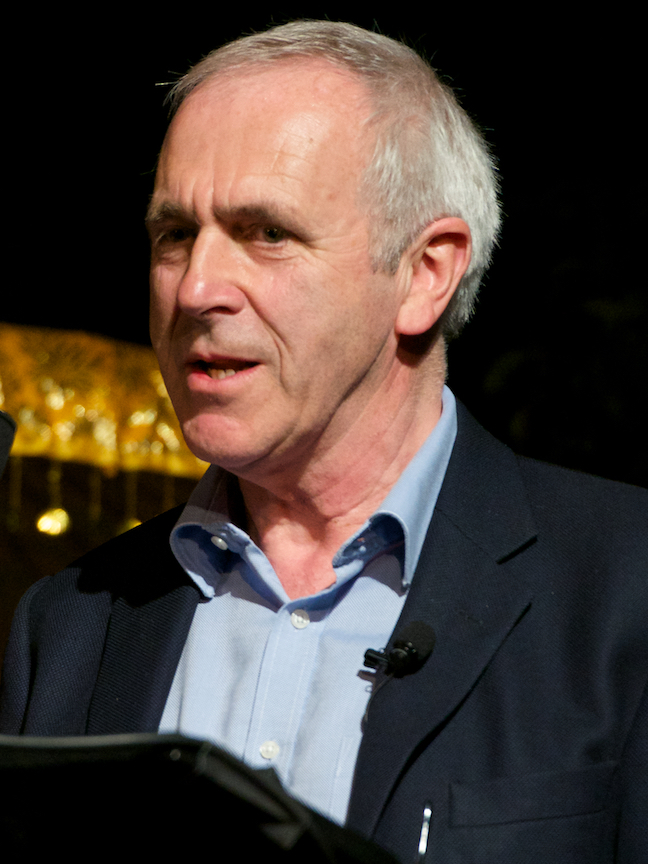
Holden in 2017

Patrick Holden, CBE is a UK organic dairy farmer, campaigner for sustainable food and farming, and co-founder with Anthony Rodale of U.K. The Sustainable Food Trust and U.S. Sustainable Food Alliance.

== Background ==
During his childhood Holden kept a variety of animals, ranging from mice and rabbits to budgerigars and myna birds, and would spend hours in his back garden studying the amphibians that migrated to the ponds he had dug as a boy.

In 1971, aged 20, Holden spent a year in the San Francisco Bay Area where he was influenced by the green movement. As a result, Holden returned to the UK and worked for a year on an intensive dairy farm in Hampshire before studying biodynamic agriculture at Emerson College (UK).

Holden then joined the back-to-the-land movement in 1973 and formed a community farm in Bwlchwernen Fawr, Wales. After the community dispersed, Holden continued to run the farm now known as Holden Farm Dairy - now the longest established organic dairy farm in Wales. Enterprises have included an 80 cow Ayrshire herd, the milk from which goes to produce Hafod, a cheddar style cheese; oats and peas; wheat for flour milling; and carrots which he grew for supermarkets for 25 years.

Alongside farming, Holden’s other work has included the development of organic standards and the market for organic foods, founding British Organic Farmers, trustee of the Soil Association, and director of the Soil Association (1995-2010). During Holden's 15 years in charge, the charity's staff rose from 5 to 180, and annual sales of organic produce in Britain rose from £50 million to £2 billion. He is also a patron of the UK Biodynamic Agricultural Association and The Living Land Trust, as well as an advisor and participant in the Prince of Wales Terra Carta initiative.

In 2010 Holden founded the Sustainable Food Trust, an organisation based in Bristol, UK that works internationally to accelerate the transition towards more sustainable food systems. Key activities of the organisation include influencing government policy on sustainable agriculture; advocacy for true cost accounting; development of a common international framework and metric for measuring on-farm sustainability; campaigning for the re-localisation of supply chains, including small abattoirs; and linking healthy diets to sustainable food production. In founding the trust, Holden was partly aiming to bridge the divide between Organic and non organic farmers, which he regrets had become somewhat binary.

== Honours ==
- Commander of the Order of the British Empire (CBE) 2004 "for services to organic farming".
- Honorary doctorate from the University of Wales Trinity Saint David. 2022
