= Colin Powell (economist) =

British economist (1937–2019)

Colin Powell

Geoffrey Colin Powell CBE (17 September 1937 – 13 May 2019) was a British economist who was influential in the development of the financial services industry in Jersey. Powell's Economic Survey of Jersey was published in 1971 and helped recommend the diversification of the economy of Jersey away from agriculture and tourism towards financial services. Powell served as an Economic Adviser to the Jersey government between 1969 and 1992.

== Biography ==
Powell was born in 1937 to Eric and Kate Powell and was educated at Wallington County Grammar School in Sutton, South London. He graduated from Jesus College, Cambridge with a first class degree in Economics in 1961. Powell married Jennifer Mary Catt in 1962, the couple had three daughters. Powell was appointed an Officer of the Order of the British Empire (OBE) in 1995 and a Commander of the Order of the British Empire (CBE) in 2005 for 'services to Financial Regulation and to the community in Jersey'. Powell was the chair of the Jersey Child Care Trust from 2001 to 2012 and an honorary member of the honorary member of the NSPCC Council. Powell was a Paul Harris Fellow of Rotary International. In 2013, Powell was awarded a Lifetime Achievement Award by the Institute of Directors of Jersey.

Outside of Jersey, Powell served as the Chairman of the Group of International Finance Centre Supervisors (formerly the Offshore Group of Banking Supervisors) from 1981 to 2011. Powell served on the Financial Action Task Force on combating terrorist financing and money laundering and was additionally co-leader of two Financial Action Task Force groups on money laundering and human trafficking and the abuse of corporate vehicles. Powell was Chair of the Basel Committee on Banking Supervision's Cross-border Banking Working Group of the Bank for International Settlements in the 1980s. Powell worked as Vice Chair of an OECD Peer Review Group that developed international standards for exchange of information for tax purposes.

A portrait of Powell, painted by Jason Butler, is in the collection of the Jersey Museum and Art Gallery. It was commissioned by Jersey Heritage. Powell died in May 2019, his funeral took place at the Parish Church of St Helier. A tribute was paid to Powell at the OECD Global Forum on Transparency and Exchange of Information in Paris in 2019. A series of memorial lectures were planned in Jersey in tribute to Powell. The Chief Minister of Jersey Senator John Le Fondré, said that Powell's "contribution to Jersey's financial services industry, and to the island itself, is incalculable". The former Chief Minister of Jersey, Frank Walker, described Powell as "... calm, considered, factual, very difficult to argue against, and very authoritative. He imbued confidence and trust".

== Economic advisor ==
Powell worked as an Economic Adviser to the Government of Northern Ireland between 1963 and 1968. He was hired by the States of Jersey in 1969 and served as an Economic Adviser to the Jersey government between 1969 and 1992 and a Chief Adviser from 1992 to 1998. Powell was the chairman of the Jersey Financial Services Commission between 1999 and 2009. From 1999 until his death Powell was an Advisor on International Affairs to the Department of the Chief Minister of Jersey.

Shortly after his arrival in Jersey Powell was given the brief by the Jersey government to "carry out the research required to establish the nature and characteristics of the island's economy [and to] ... provide forecasts of the rate at which it is likely to grow". Powell's study, Economic Survey of Jersey was published by the States of Jersey in 1971.

The Government of Jersey said of the report that it was "not only a detailed examination of the Jersey economy, but a blueprint for its future development". The report analysed a diverse range of issues from "crop patterns and air freight to land reclamation and sewage treatment". The study predicted that Jersey's economy would need to diversify with the decline of tourism. At the time of the study half of Jersey's income came from tourism with finance contributing only 9%. Powell advocated in his study for the "favouring [of] high-quality businesses" which provided the great expansion in Jersey's economy over the ensuing decades with the hosting of international banks and financial services institutions.

Powell wrote in the study that "If the attractions of Jersey as a low-tax area stem from the high levels of UK taxation, the island should not be criticised for offering an escape". Oliver Bullough described the study as "curiously anarchic for a government economist" and paraphrased Powell's aforementioned recommendation as "In other words: if laws are dumb, there is nothing wrong with working around them". Writing in the Bailiwick Express after Powell's death, Fiona Potigny described the study as "a forensic examination of the future challenges for Jersey's economy, which made accurate predictions decades ahead of time" and that Powell was 'widely regarded as the architect of Jersey's finance industry'. The finance industry subsequently grew to become Jersey's largest employer at the time of Powell's death in 2019. Powell became a defender of Jersey's economic status in his later years; defending Jersey at international summits amid criticism of Jersey as a tax haven and a destination for the laundering of money.

Powell was prominently featured in "The fall of Jersey: how a tax haven goes bust", a long read article written by Oliver Bullough in The Guardian in December 2015. Bullough said that Powell had "guided finance's colonisation of Jersey" since his arrival on the island and described him as "long-nosed and lean, [with] a disconcertingly precise power of recall over almost any detail of his five decades on the island". Powell was interviewed by Jersey's Business Connect for his response to the article following its publication.

John Christensen, the founder of Tax Justice Network, was hired by Powell as his assistant in 1987. Christensen described Powell in a 2014 interview as "... the architect of Jersey's tax haven, and currently the international ambassador to Jersey's tax haven efforts". Powell said that international investors "... know that Jersey has political stability, doesn't have political parties. It's not going to be faced with a sudden swing to the left, or swing to the right, or whatever direction, a change of tax arrangements. It's also got fiscal stability".
