= Robert E. Glover =

American engineer

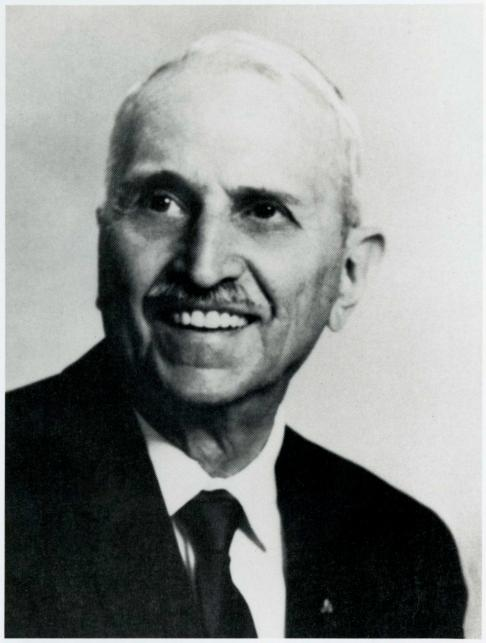

Robert Ellsworth Glover (1896 – 1984) was an American engineer, who was an instructor at Colorado State University, and who worked at the United States Bureau of Reclamation from 1920-1954.

Glover worked on the Gibson Dam, the Glen Canyon Dam, the Owyhee Dam and the Boulder (Hoover) Dam. He published widely on groundwater movement, hydraulics, the trial-load method and thermal properties of concrete. After 1954, he worked for Boeing Aircraft and then with the U.S. Geological Survey. Glover also developed and taught a course on groundwater at CSU.

Glover’s papers, which are archived at Colorado State University, include personal and professional aspects of his life, including diaries, maps, notes, photographs, publications and reports. The collection includes a large number of documents, photographs and maps pertaining to numerous Bureau of Reclamation dam projects.

== Notable works ==
- Glover, R. E. (1960) "Ground water-surface water relationships". In Ground Water Section, Western Resources Conference, Boulder, Colorado. Colorado Ground Water Comm., Dept. Natural Resources, Colorado State University Paper CER6ORG45, 8 pp.
- Glover, R. E. (1964) "Ground-water movement". U. S. Bureau of Reclamation Eng. Mon. 31, 67 pp.
- Glover, R. E. and C. G. Balmer (1954) "River depletion resulting from pumping a well near a river". Am. Geo-phys. Union Trans. v. 35. pt. 3, pp. 468–470.
