= British Meat Processors Association =

The British Meat Processors Association (BMPA) is a trade association that represents the meat processing industry in the UK.

== Structure ==
It is headquartered in the north of the City of London, between City Thameslink railway station and St Bartholomew's Hospital, north of the eastern end of the A40 - Newgate Street and Holborn Viaduct on Cock Lane.

== Function ==
It represents the meat industry in the UK.
