= Mary Macdonald =

Dame Mary Beaton Macdonald DBE (born 29 July 1950; née Skinner) is a British schoolteacher and former headmistress who was made a Dame Commander of the Order of the British Empire in 2005 for her work turning around the failing Riverside Community Primary School in North Shields, Tyneside, where she spent thirteen years.

== False Allegations ==
In 2005, the same year she was knighted, Dame Mary was falsely accused of assaulting a pupil at an assembly rehearsal.

Two mothers turned up, obviously very angry, and one of them accused me of slapping her child… Obviously I quickly denied it; it was too ridiculous for words. I hardly knew the child or the parent. It was a child in our early years section. I didn't know anything about the incident - I hadn't been anywhere near the early years area during the practice assembly, which is when the parent said something had happened. It appeared that the child had behaved badly and lashed out at other pupils and staff. A nursery nurse had held her on her knee throughout the rehearsal to keep her under control. "I think this mother was annoyed that someone had seen fit to discipline her daughter and she was determined to make trouble for the school", according to Dame Mary.

The two mothers refused to leave until they learned the police were on their way. The police and the Local Education Authority (LEA) completely exonerated Dame Mary. Outlandish rumours and innuendo began circulating that Dame Mary had kicked the child all around the school hall. Some of these were overheard by a bureaucrat who reported the hearsay to another division of the police. Soon, calls for her resignation were being made. Ultimately, dame Mary was found to be totally innocent.

Dame Mary holds that schools should have the right to sue parents who make false allegations against staff and to exclude pupils who do the same. She has worked with the local authority to improve protection for teachers.
