= Deaths in April 2006 =

The following is a list of notable deaths in April 2006.

Entries for each day are listed alphabetically by surname. A typical entry lists information in the following sequence:

- Name, age, country of citizenship at birth, subsequent country of citizenship (if applicable), reason for notability, cause of death (if known), and reference.

== April 2006 ==
=== 1 ===
- John Bissant, 92, American baseball player.
- Gary Dineen, 62, Canadian ice hockey player (Minnesota North Stars), coach, and Olympian (1964, 1968).
- Annesley Kingsford, 93, Canadian rower and Olympian (1936).
- Bill Pierro, 79, American baseball player (Pittsburgh Pirates).
- In Tam, 83, Cambodian politician.
- Oscar Treadwell, 79, American jazz radio journalist and presenter.
- Wilfred Waters, 83, British cyclist and Olympian (1948).

=== 2 ===
- Sir Anthony Beaumont-Dark, 73, British politician, former Conservative Member of Parliament.
- Bernard Seigal, 48, American musician and essayist with the stage name Buddy Blue, co-founder of the Beat Farmers, heart attack.
- Nina Schenk Gräfin von Stauffenberg, 92, German widow of Hitler's would-be assassin.

=== 3 ===
- Tom Abercrombie, 75, American National Geographic photographer, complications from open-heart surgery.
- Barry Bingham Jr., 72, American television and radio executive, former editor and publisher of the Louisville Courier-Journal and the Louisville Times.
- Lou Carrol, 83, American traveling salesman, gave Checkers to Richard Nixon.
- Doug Coombs, 48, American extreme skier, ski accident in the French Alps.
- Michel Delire, 72, Belgian footballer.
- Bill Durkee, 84, American basketball player (California Golden Bears, Minneapolis Lakers).
- Dick Erdlitz, 86, American football player (Philadelphia Eagles, Miami Seahawks).
- Ewan Fenton, 76, Scottish footballer.
- Martin Gilks, 41, English musician, former drummer with The Wonder Stuff, motorcycle accident.
- Marshall Goldberg, 88, American football player (Chicago Cardinals), complications due to a head injury.
- Al Harker, 95, American soccer player, last surviving member of the US 1934 FIFA World Cup soccer team.
- Royce Lint, 85, American baseball player (St. Louis Cardinals).
- Muhammad al-Maghut, 71, Syrian poet and playwright.
- Genzō Murakami, 96, Japanese novelist.
- Walter W. Ristow, 97, American map librarian at the New York Public Library and the Library of Congress.
- Sir Andrew Stark, 89, British diplomat, Ambassador to Denmark (1971–1976).
- Ida Vos, 74, Dutch writer.

=== 4 ===
- Mary Boyce, 85, British authority on Iran.
- Toddie Byrne, 71, Irish politician.
- Fred J. Christensen, 84, American fighter ace in World War II.
- Eckhard Dagge, 58, former German WBC junior middleweight champion.
- Sir Roy Denman, 81, British civil servant and diplomat.
- Denis Donaldson, 55-56, British former head of Sinn Féin at Stormont, and British double-agent, found shot dead at his home.
- Gary Gray, 69, American child actor of the 1940s, cancer.
- John de Courcy Ireland, 94, Irish maritime historian and political activist.
- John George Macleod, 90, Scottish physician.
- Jürgen Thorwald, 90, German writer.
- Vickery Turner, 61, British actress of the 60's.
- Frederick B. Williams, 66, American minister of the Church of the Intercession in Harlem, New York City.
- Robert Zimmermann, 93, Swiss cyclist.

=== 5 ===
- Alain de Boissieu, 91, French General and son-in-law of Charles De Gaulle.
- Carequinha, 90, Brazilian entertainer who performed as "Carequinha" the clown.
- Albert Fish, 83-84, Canadian politician, member of the House of Commons of Canada (1979-1980).
- J. B. Fuqua, 87, American entrepreneur and philanthropist.
- Allan Kaprow, 78, American artist and art theorist, natural causes.
- Ray Krzoska, 87, American basketball player.
- Armando Labra, 62, Mexican economist.
- Pasquale Macchi, 82, Italian Roman Catholic archbishop, former private secretary to Pope Paul VI.
- Gene Pitney, 66, American singer ("Town Without Pity", "(The Man Who Shot) Liberty Valance", "Twenty Four Hours from Tulsa") and songwriter, heart disease.
- Yevgeny Seredin, 48, Soviet Russian Olympic swimmer (1976, 1980).
- Abdul Salam al-Ujayli, 88, Syrian novelist.

=== 6 ===
- Augustyn Bloch, 76, Polish composer and organist.
- Maggie Dixon, 28, American women's basketball coach at United States Military Academy, cardiac arrhythmia.
- Francis L. Kellogg, 89, American diplomat.
- Leslie Norris, 84, Welsh poet and professor at Brigham Young University.

=== 7 ===
- Roger Arnaldez, 94, French professor of Islamic studies.
- Jim Clack, 58, American football player (Pittsburgh Steelers, New York Giants), heart attack.
- Frederick Alvin Daugherty, 91, American district judge.
- Adamas Golodets, 72, Soviet football player and manager.
- Vojislav Melić, 66, Yugoslavian footballer.
- Bobbie Nudie, 92, American fashion designer.
- Théogène Ricard, 96, Canadian politician, member of the House of Commons of Canada (1958-1972).
- Ian David Sinclair, 92, Canadian politician, member of the Senate of Canada (1983-1988).

=== 8 ===
- Sven Axbom, 79, Swedish footballer.
- Jack Bowsher, 75, American racing driver and owner.
- Bill Collins, 77, American golfer.
- Henry Lewy, 79, German-American sound engineer and record producer.
- Richard Pearlman, 68, American theatre and opera director, director of the Lyric Opera Center for American Artists.
- Gerard Reve, 82, Dutch author (The Evenings, The Fourth Man), Alzheimer's disease.
- Valentine Telegdi, 84, Hungarian-American physicist.

=== 9 ===
- Albin Collins, 78, American football player (Chicago Hornets, Baltimore Colts, Green Bay Packers).
- Christian Compton, 76, American jurist, justice of the Supreme Court of Virginia.
- Frank Gibney, 81, American writer and journalist on Asia.
- Billy Hitchcock, 89, American baseball, coach and manager (Detroit Tigers).
- Bill Jones, 92, American basketball player.
- Russell Knipp, 63, American weightlifter and Olympian (1968, 1972).
- Robin Orr, 96, Scottish classical composer and conductor.
- Jimmy Outlaw, 93, American baseball player (Cincinnati Reds, Detroit Tigers).
- Georges Rawiri, 74, Gabonese politician, president of the Senate and former foreign minister.
- Hermann Schild, 93, German cyclist, National Champion (1954).
- Vilgot Sjöman, 81, Swedish film director (I Am Curious (Yellow)), complications from brain haemorrhage.
- Natalia Troitskaya, 55, Russian operatic soprano.

=== 10 ===
- Joe Faragalli, 76, Canadian Football League head coach with the Saskatchewan Roughriders and Edmonton Eskimos.
- Jean Grosjean, 93, French poet, writer and translator.
- Bishop Charles Henderson, 81, Irish retired Catholic Auxiliary Bishop of Southwark, England, KC*HS, cancer.
- Chuck Ulrich, 76, American football player (Illinois Fighting Illini, Chicago Cardinals).
- Notable Kenyans killed in the 2006 Kenyan Air Force Harbin Y-12 crash:
  - Bonaya Godana, 54, politician, MP for North Horr Constituency (since 1988), minister of foreign affairs (1998–2001).
  - William Waqo, Anglican prelate, assistant bishop of Kirinyaga.

=== 11 ===
- Gianni Corsaro, 80, Italian Olympic racewalker (1948, 1960).
- Leonard Dommett, 77, Australian violinist and conductor.
- Les Foote, 81, Australian Football Hall of Fame member.
- Siobhán O'Hanlon, 43, Northern Irish Sinn Féin politician, cancer.
- Winand Osiński, 92, Polish Olympic runner (1952).
- June Pointer, 52, American singer (The Pointer Sisters), lung cancer.
- Proof, 32, American rapper (D-12), shot.
- Shin Sang-ok, 80, Korean film producer, liver problems.
- Sergey Tereshchenkov, 67, Soviet Russian Olympic cyclist (1964).
- Angus Wells, 63, English fiction writer.

=== 12 ===
- Muhsin Musa Matwalli Atwah, 41, Egyptian militant, killed by Pakistani forces.
- Richard Bebb, 79, British actor.
- William Sloane Coffin, 81, American minister and peace activist, congestive heart failure.
- Andy Duncan, 83, American basketball player (Rochester Royals, Boston Celtics).
- Paulina Kernberg, 71, Chilean-born American child psychiatrist, professor at Cornell University.
- Kazuo Kuroki, 75, Japanese film director.
- Shekhar Mehta, 60, Kenyan rally driver, five-time winner of the Safari Rally & president of the FIA's World Rally Championship commission, illness relating to complications from an old injury.
- Puggy Pearson, 77, American poker player.
- Albert Ernest Radford, 88, American botanist.
- Rajkumar, 76, Indian actor, cardiac arrest.
- William Woo, 69, first Asian-American to be editor of a major American daily newspaper, the St. Louis Post-Dispatch, professor at Stanford University.

=== 13 ===
- Bill Baker, 95, American baseball player (Cincinnati Reds, Pittsburgh Pirates, St. Louis Cardinals).
- Dutch Fehring, 93, American baseball and football player, coach, and administrator (Chicago White Sox).
- Terry Nugent, 85, Canadian politician, member of the House of Commons of Canada (1958-1968).
- John Read, 85, British television producer and cinematographer.
- Dame Muriel Spark, 88, British novelist (The Prime of Miss Jean Brodie, The Mandelbaum Gate, The Driver's Seat).
- Bruce Weber, 54, Australian rules football executive who was president of the Port Adelaide Football Club.
- Arthur Winston, 100, American Los Angeles County Metropolitan Transportation Authority employee, famous for serving for 76 years and retiring at age 100.

=== 14 ===
- Mahmut Bakalli, 70, Kosovo ethnic Albanian politician.
- Henry Callow, Isle of Man jurist.
- A. B. A. Ghani Khan Choudhury, 78, Indian politician.
- Napoleon Dame, 92, Canadian ice hockey player (Montreal Canadiens).
- Tom Ferguson, 62, American medical doctor and author.
- Miguel Reale, 95, Brazilian philosopher of law, heart attack.
- Eberhardt Rechtin, 80, American electrical engineer and telecommunications expert.
- Włodzimierz Różański, 67, Polish Olympic field hockey player (1960).

=== 15 ===
- Raúl Corrales Forno, 81, Cuban photographer .
- Jago Eliot, 40, English aristocrat, surfer and cyber artist, epilepsy.
- Calum Kennedy, 77, Scottish traditional singer.
- Pavel Koutecký, 49, Czech documentary film maker, accidental fall.
- Les Palmer, 82, American football player (Philadelphia Eagles).
- Louise Smith, 89, American NASCAR racer, first woman inducted into the International Motorsports Hall of Fame, known as "the first lady of racing," complications from cancer.
- Vusumzi Make, 75, South African politician

=== 16 ===
- Francisco Adam, 22, Portuguese actor, traffic collision.
- Lorraine Borg, 82, American baseball player (AAGPBL)
- Philippe Castelli, 80, Franch actor.
- Richard Eckersley, 65, English graphic designer.
- Morton Freedgood, 93, American author (The Taking of Pelham One Two Three) under the pseudonym of John Godey.
- Brett Goldin, 27, South African actor, shot.
- Poopak Goldarreh, 34, Iranian actress, traffic collision.
- Harold Horwood, 82, Canadian writer and former Newfoundland politician, cancer.
- Stephen Marshall, 20, American double murderer, suicide by gunshot.
- Daniel Schaefer, 70, American politician, former Republican United States Representative from Colorado served 1983–1999, cancer.
- Jake Seamer, 92, English cricketer.
- Silvia Caos, 72, Cuban-Mexican actress.

=== 17 ===
- Jean Bernard, 98, French hematologist.
- Scott Brazil, 50, American television producer and director (The Shield, Hill Street Blues, Nash Bridges), complications from amyotrophic lateral sclerosis.
- Price Brookfield, 85, American basketball player (Indianapolis Jets, Rochester Royals).
- Peter Cadbury, 88, British entrepreneur and one of the founders of commercial TV broadcasting in the UK.
- Al Cederberg, 88, American politician, former Republican United States Representative from Michigan from 1953 to 1978 and former mayor of Bay City, Michigan.
- Aleksandr Dolgushin, 60, Soviet Russian water polo player and Olympian (1968, 1972, 1976).
- Henderson Forsythe, 88, American actor (As the World Turns).
- Arthur Hertzberg, 84, Polish-born American rabbi and scholar of Judaism.
- Peter Pospíšil, 61, Slovak Olympic handball player (1972).
- Vaishnavi, 22, Indian Bollywood actress, suicide by hanging.

=== 18 ===
- Bindhyabasini Devi, 86, Indian folk singer.
- Ken Jones, 84, Welsh rugby union player, Wales and British Lion rugby union player and silver medal Olympian (1948).
- John Lyall, 66, British football manager with West Ham United F.C. and Ipswich Town F.C., heart attack.
- Grady McWhiney, 77, American historian.
- Dick Rockwell, 85, American cartoonist, assistant on Steve Canyon, nephew of Norman Rockwell.
- Eivind Skabo, 89, Norwegian canoeist and Olympian (1948).
- Joseph Vissers, 77, Belgian Olympic boxer (1948).

=== 19 ===
- Oscar Acosta, 49, American baseball player.
- John Cosgrove, 56, American politician, member of the Florida House of Representatives.
- Scott Crossfield, 84, American X-15 test pilot, plane crash.
- Bob Dove, 85, American Hall of Fame football player (Chicago Cardinals, Detroit Lions).
- Jo de Haan, 69, Dutch cyclist.
- Duncan Jessiman, 82, Canadian politician, member of the Senate of Canada (1993-1998).
- June Knox-Mawer, 75, British writer and radio broadcaster.
- Ellen Kuzwayo, 91, South African author, anti-apartheid activist, and member of Parliament, diabetes.
- Sir Ian Morrow, 93, British accountant and businessman.
- Gene Rosenthal, 91, American basketball player.

=== 20 ===
- Kathleen Antonelli, 85, Irish computer programmer, one of the ENIAC original computer programmers, cancer.
- Cy Bahakel, 87, American media magnate.
- Rebecca Cremer, 82, American Olympic alpine skier (1948).
- Stanley Hiller, 81, American helicopter designer.
- George Johnston, 85, Canadian ice hockey player (Chicago Black Hawks).
- Igor Kuljerić, 68, Croatian composer and conductor.
- Anna Svidersky, 17, Russian teenager, murdered while working at McDonald's, stabbed.
- Wolfgang Unzicker, 80, German chess grandmaster.
- Robert Wegman, 87, American businessman, chairman and former CEO of Wegmans Food Markets, Inc., philanthropist.
- Miguel Zacarías, 101, Mexican film director.

=== 21 ===
- Sir Richard Bayliss, 89, British physician, Physician to the Queen (1973-1981).
- Jacob Kovco, 25, first Australian Defence Force service person killed in Iraq.
- T. K. Ramakrishnan, 84, Indian politician.
- Telê Santana, 74, Brazilian football coach, complications from an intestinal infection.

=== 22 ===
- Henriette Avram, 86, American library systems analyst, developed MARC cataloging format.
- Ed Davis, 89, American California State Senator and former Los Angeles police chief (1969–1978).
- Enriqueta Harris, 95, English art historian.
- Nobby Lawton, 65, English footballer, midfielder & former captain of Preston North End, cancer.
- Frank Muehlheuser, 79, American football player (Boston Yanks, New York Bulldogs).
- Jobie Nutarak, 58, Canadian politician, snowmobile accident.
- Janez Pintar, 75, Slovenian Olympic rower (1960).
- Satyadeow Sawh, 50, Guyanese Minister of Fisheries, Crops and Livestock. Shot by masked gunmen.
- Ronnie Sox, 67, American drag racing pioneer.
- Alida Valli, 84, Italian actress (The Third Man).
- Fausto Vitello, 59, Argentine-American businessman and magazine publisher, founding publisher of the skateboarding magazine Thrasher, heart attack.
- Martín Zapata, 35, Colombian footballer.

=== 23 ===
- Abdul Ghafar Baba, 81, Malaysian former Deputy Prime Minister.
- Susan Browning, 65, American actress (The World According to Garp, The Money Pit, Sister Act).
- Harvey Bullock, 84, American television writer and producer (The Andy Griffith Show, The Love Boat, Love, American Style).
- Johnny Checketts, 94, New Zealand World War II flying ace.
- Willie Finnigan, 93, Scottish footballer (Hibernian).
- Boris Fraenkel, 85, French Trotskyist.
- Barry Gibbs, 73, South Australian cricket official.
- William Gottlieb, 89, American jazz photographer.
- Jennifer Jayne, 74, British actress (The Adventures of William Tell, Hysteria, Clash by Night).
- Florence Mars, 83, American civil rights activist and author.
- Ian Nelson, 50, English saxophone and clarinet musician, died in his sleep.
- David Peckinpah, 54, American television producer and director (Silk Stalkings, Sliders, Beauty and the Beast), heart attack.
- Billy Queen, 77, American baseball player (Milwaukee Braves).
- Phil Walden, 66, American founder of Capricorn Records, cancer.
- Isaac Witkin, 69, South African-born American sculptor.

=== 24 ===
- Erik Bergman, 94, Finnish composer.
- Appie Corman, 80, Dutch Olympic boxer (1948).
- Peter Ellis, 58, British television director.
- Nasreen Pervin Huq, 47, Bangladeshi women's activist and Director of Action Aid, from getting hit by a car.
- László Jeney, 82, Hungarian Olympic water polo player (1948, 1952, 1956, 1960).
- Brian Labone, 66, English footballer, Everton and England player, heart attack.
- Bonnie Owens, 76, American country music singer.
- Jimmy Sharman, 94, Australian boxing troupe impresario.
- Dr. Rajkumar, 76, Legendary Indian Kannada Cinema Actor, heart attack.
- Sibby Sisti, 85, American MLB player (Boston Bees/Boston Braves/Milwaukee Braves).
- Steve Stavro, 78, Canadian grocery store magnate and a former owner of the Toronto Maple Leafs, heart attack.
- Gérard Sturla, 75, French basketball player and Olympian (1956).
- Moshe Teitelbaum, 91, Hungarian-born Hasidic rebbe, of Satmar, one of the largest Hassidic Jewish groups in the world.

=== 25 ===
- Giovanni Bertorelli, 77, Venezuelan Olympic fencer (1952).
- Ronald Girdwood, 89, Scottish physician.
- Joseph S. Iseman, 89, American lawyer, educator and former president of Bennington College, cardiac arrest.
- Jane Jacobs, 89, American-born Canadian urban activist and author (The Death and Life of Great American Cities), stroke.
- John Kerr, 81, Irish ballad singer.
- Peter Law, 58, Welsh politician, independent MP and AM, brain tumor.
- Tabe Slioor, 79, Finnish socialite.

=== 26 ===
- Bernie Darre, 66, American football player (Tulane Green Wave, Washington Redskins).
- Moshe Halberstam, 74, Israeli Rabbi, Dean of Tshakava Yeshivah and prominent member of the Edah Charedis Rabbinical Court of Jerusalem.
- Daryl Mack, 47, American convicted murderer, execution by lethal injection.
- Yuval Ne'eman, 80, Israeli physicist, founder of the Israel Space Agency, science minister, and President of Tel Aviv University.
- Russ Swan, 42, American baseball player (Seattle Mariners, San Francisco Giants, Cleveland Indians), fall.
- Hal Thompson, 83, American football player (Delaware Fightin' Blue Hens, Brooklyn Dodgers).

=== 27 ===
- Wacław Latocha, 69, Polish Olympic cyclist (1964, 1968).
- Pat Marsden, 69, Canadian sportscaster, lung cancer.
- Strini Moodley, 60, South African founding member of Black Consciousness Movement.
- Kay Noble, 65, American wrestler.
- Gösta Sandberg, 73, Swedish footballer, ice hockey player, and Olympian (1952).
- Julia Thorne, 61, American author, bladder cancer.
- Mel Tom, 64, American football player (Philadelphia Eagles, Chicago Bears), heart failure.
- Alexander Trowbridge, 76, American politician and businessman, Secretary of Commerce under US President Lyndon B. Johnson from 1967 to 1968, former president of the National Association of Manufacturers.

=== 28 ===
- Mustapha Adnane, 74-75, Moroccan Olympic weightlifter (1960, 1964).
- Helen Armstrong, 63, American concert violinist.
- Carmen Acevedo Vega, 92, Ecuadorian poet, writer, and journalist.
- Ángel O. Berríos, 65, Puerto Rican engineer, former mayor of Caguas, heart failure.
- Clara Bimbocci, 87, Italian Olympic gymnast (1936).
- Wally Hayward, 97, South African long distance runner and Olympian (1952).
- Steve Howe, 48, American baseball player (New York Yankees, Los Angeles Dodgers, Minnesota Twins), traffic collision.
- Jan Koetsier, 94, Dutch composer and conductor.
- Ben-Zion Orgad, 80, Israeli composer, cancer.
- M. G. G. Pillai, 67, Malaysian journalist and political activist, heart complications.

=== 29 ===
- Sid Barron, 88, Canadian cartoonist.
- John Kenneth Galbraith, 97, American economist and author (The Affluent Society), natural causes.
- Antonio Hoffmann, 76, Puerto Rican Olympic weightlifter (1952).
- Siegfried Joksch, 88, Austrian footballer and Olympian (1948).
- Shankar Lakshman, 72, Indian field hockey player and Olympian (1956, 1960, 1964).
- Alberta Nelson, 68, American actress (Bikini Beach, Pajama Party, Peyton Place).
- Nikolay Rudzinkas, 73, Soviet Lithuanian canoeist and Olympian (1960).
- Félix Siby, 64, Gabonese politician and former government minister.
- John C. Trever, 90, American scholar who photographed the Dead Sea Scrolls in Jerusalem.
- Alvin S. White, 87, American test pilot.
- Willi Zacharias, 92, Romanian Olympic handball player and skier (1936 Winter, 1936 Summer).

=== 30 ===
- Dave Bartosch, 89, American baseball player (St. Louis Cardinals).
- Jay Bernstein, 69, American Hollywood publicist.
- Ben Blaisse, 94, Dutch speed skater and Olympian (1936).
- Barry Driscoll, 79, British sculptor and painter, cancer.
- Jean-François Revel, 82, French philosopher.
- Corinne Rey-Bellet, 33, Swiss Alpine skier and Olympian (1992, 1994, 1998, 2002), shot dead.
- William Roberts, 105, British First World War veteran.
- Moshe Shmuel Shapiro, 88, Belarusian-born rabbi and Rosh Yeshiva of Yeshivas Be'er Yaakov in Israel.
- Paul Spiegel, 68, German chairman of the Central Council of German Jews, natural causes.
- Pramoedya Ananta Toer, 81, Indonesian writer.
- Beatriz Sheridan, 71, Mexican actress and director.
