= Mourning sickness =

Collective emotional condition

Mourning sickness is a collective emotional condition of "recreational grieving" by individuals in the wake of celebrity deaths and other public traumas. Such traumas may be linked to hyper-attentive, intrusive, and voyeuristic media coverage, which has been dubbed grief porn.

== History ==
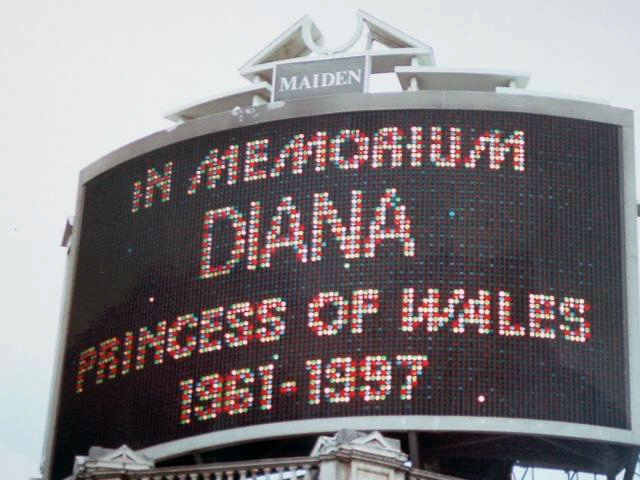
A misspelled "In memoriam" message of condolence at Trafalgar Square following Princess Diana's death

The history of mourning sickness in Great Britain can be traced to the public reaction to the Dunblane massacre in March 1996 when a lone assailant killed 16 schoolchildren and their teacher at the Dunblane Primary School in Scotland, injuring 14 others. The tragedy prompted a public reaction that brought a flood of flowers and sympathy cards from across Britain and even overseas from people unconnected to the victims of the tragedy or even the area where it happened.

A worldwide exhibit of mourning sickness, centred on Britain once again, following the death of Diana, Princess of Wales in 1997 when the Princess was killed in a car crash in Paris. Almost immediately following word of her death, makeshift memorials to Diana, who had been a hugely popular figure worldwide since her marriage to Prince Charles in 1981, began to pop up, most notably at her residence at Kensington Palace. The memorials became a gathering place for public weeping and for people to bring flowers. Ian Jack, writing in The Guardian, argued that this recreational grieving changed a simple observer of a news story into an active participant, changing people "from audience to actor".

Similar displays of public grief occurred following the death in April 1998 of Linda McCartney (wife of former Beatle Paul McCartney), the murder of BBC journalist Jill Dando in April 1999, the murder of seven-year-old Surrey girl Sarah Payne in West Sussex in July 2000, and the murder of two 10-year-old girls from Soham, Cambridgeshire, in August 2002.

== Anna Svidersky ==
Logo and photo of Anna Svidersky from the memorial site, annasvidersky.net

The advent of the Internet added a new development in public mourning sickness that was displayed following the murder of American teenager Anna Svidersky in Vancouver, Washington. Svidersky was murdered while working at a McDonald's restaurant by schizophrenic sex offender David Barton Sullivan. News of her death quickly spread worldwide, initially through the website MySpace, where she had a personal page, and then through other similar sites. This created an effect of mass grief and mourning for her around the world mostly from people who had previously known nothing about her.

In Britain, The Guardian newspaper compared the widespread expression of grief by strangers to that seen after the death of Princess Diana. The paper cited the 2004 Civitas think-tank, which described such grief as "mourning sickness", related to people's own emotional needs, rather than any real rapport with the deceased.

== Criticism ==
Some critics have described the public displays of mourning as "phony" and more for the benefit of the people grieving than for the victims, families or individuals that they are grieving for. The media plays a pivotal role in these displays, focusing attention on the public reaction to these events. Times journalist Patrick West said in his booklet Conspicuous Compassion that "mourning sickness is a religion for the lonely crowd that no longer subscribes to orthodox churches. Its flowers and teddies are its rites, its collective minute's silences its liturgy and mass." In 2005, Journalist Rosie Boycott narrated an episode of Five's Don't Get Me Started about mourning sickness.

== Media "grief porn" ==
"Grief porn" is a pejorative, neologistic expression usually used to describe the behavior of the news media in the wake of trauma. It is distinctly different from schadenfreude in that it describes a forced or artificial commiseration in response to unfortunate events, whereas the latter refers to a joy at the misfortune of others. Commentators like Charlie Brooker have noted that the distinction can be blurred by the 24-hour news cycle and its need to produce news stories.

Robert Yates, assistant editor for The Observer, described some media coverage of deaths as producing "gratification derived from a tenuous connection to the misfortunes of others; the gratuitous indulgence of tangential association with tragedy; getting off on really bad news". Yates was remarking on the phenomenon he first noticed following the death of Princess Diana and the media frenzy that occurred afterwards. He reportedly observed an increase in activity during times of national mourning and international disaster, and commented dryly that it primarily affects people working in media.

Carol Sarler, writing as a guest columnist for The Times, noted that "this new and peculiar pornography of grief" is sometimes called a 'tribute', "the cruder truth is that ersatz grief is now the new pornography; like the worst of hard-core, it is stimulus by proxy, voyeuristically piggy-backing upon that which might otherwise be deemed personal and private, for no better reason than frisson and the quickening of an otherwise jaded pulse."

The Times online's Daniel Finkelstein, called such coverage "a rather tasteless fascination with other people's disasters and a sentimentalism that is out of place". However, he did not think this explained people's fascination with all deaths; using the example of Madeleine McCann, a four-year-old child who went missing while on holiday with her parents, Finkelstein theorized that "we don't follow the McCann case because we are grief junkies. Most of us follow it because we fancy ourselves as (Inspector) Morse."
