= Lou Carrol =

American businessman

Louis Leon Carrol (March 28, 1923 – April 3, 2006) was an American businessman who is best known for giving then-U.S. Senator Richard Nixon a puppy in 1952 that was used as the subject of the Checkers speech, which kept Nixon on the Republican ticket as the vice presidential candidate in that year's presidential election.

Carrol was born in Lynn, Massachusetts and graduated from Lynn English High School in 1940. He graduated from the Bentley Business School in Boston. After graduation, he served as an officer in the United States Army in European Theater of Operations during World War II and received the Bronze Star Medal for valor and Purple Heart for injuries during the Battle of the Bulge. After the war he attended Indiana University Bloomington, receiving a Bachelor of Science degree in Business in 1948. He also served in the army reserves until 1953.

Carrol was senior executive vice president of sales at Lawson Products Inc. in Des Plaines, Illinois at his retirement in 1996. His death was attributed to natural causes.

== Contact with Nixon ==
In 1952, Carrol read a newspaper article that quoted Pat Nixon expressing a desire to have a puppy for the Nixons' two daughters. Carrol's Cocker Spaniel, Boots, had just given birth to a large litter.

After reading the article, Carrol went to a nearby Western Union office and sent a telegram to Nixon's office in Washington, D.C. Carrol, who was working as a traveling salesman in rural Texas, began the telegram: "On behalf of the great state of Texas, I wish to offer the Nixons a cocker spaniel puppy, purebred and registered."

About a week later, Carrol received a letter from Nixon's personal secretary, Rose Mary Woods. The letter, which Carrol kept framed in his den, read in part: "The senator had been planning to buy a puppy for the little girls and they were particularly fond of cocker spaniels. I know therefore they will be delighted to receive this puppy."

Carrol later was a guest on the quiz shows What's My Line and I've Got A Secret, but otherwise never received much publicity -- "nor was I seeking it," he told The Baltimore Sun in 2002, the 50th anniversary of the speech.
