= Murder of Anna Svidersky =

2006 murder in Vancouver, Washington, United States

Anna Svidersky
- Anna Svidersky: one of the photos on her MySpace web page
- Born: April 26, 1988; Novoorenburg, Russian SFSR, Soviet Union
- Died: April 20, 2006 (aged 17); Vancouver, Washington, U.S.

Anna Esther Svidersky (April 26, 1988 – April 20, 2006) was a teenager who lived in the U.S. city of Vancouver, Washington. She was murdered while working in a McDonald's restaurant, by David Barton Sullivan, a schizophrenic twice-convicted sex offender. News of her death quickly spread worldwide, initially through MySpace, where she had a personal page, and then through other similar sites. The widespread expression of grief over Anna's death by strangers around the world was compared by The Guardian newspaper in Britain to that seen after Diana, Princess of Wales' death.

== Background ==
Anna Svidersky was born in Russia. Her family came from Novoorenburg, a small city near the border of Kazakhstan and about 900 miles southeast of Moscow. They moved to California before her second birthday. She had one older brother and two younger sisters. In 2001, her mother, Esther, moved with the children to Vancouver, Washington, where she has relatives, after a divorce from Andrew Svidersky.

Svidersky was a student at Fort Vancouver High School in Vancouver and worked at the Andresen Road McDonald's. She had intended to go to college after her senior year, and was due to graduate in June. The year before her death, she worked up to three different jobs at a time, in addition to her school studies.

== Death ==
David Barton Sullivan, who had previously been convicted twice of sex crimes, left his home on the day of the murder with the intention of "hurting a female", and according to police, did not know Anna Svidersky. He entered the Andresen Road McDonald's at around 8 pm and stabbed her with a kitchen knife.

Sullivan was captured soon after the attack. He had discarded the knife he used, but was still covered in blood when discovered. He was charged with first-degree murder, but on June 26, 2007, he was acquitted by reason of insanity and was committed indefinitely to a mental hospital.

== Aftermath ==
The murder dominated the news in Svidersky's home town. A dedicated page put up on MySpace by Svidersky's friends received 1,200 posts in three days. Internet users on other sites such as YouTube also posted tributes.

The McDonald's restaurant where she worked in Vancouver held a fund-raising day for her family, trying to raise $15,000, but actually achieved nearly $85,000, as of April 28, 2006, and finally ran out of food. McDonald's Corp. matched $1.50 per dollar and other local McDonald's franchises 25 cents per dollar.

The news of Svidersky's murder spread worldwide within days through internet sites, creating a phenomenon of collective grief from users, the great majority of whom were complete strangers to her. In Britain, The Guardian newspaper compared the widespread expression of grief by strangers to that seen after the death of Diana, Princess of Wales. The paper cited the 2004 CIVITAS think-tank, which described such grief as "mourning sickness", related to people's own emotional needs, rather than any real rapport with the deceased. De Volkskrant likened the mass mourning to that which followed the death of Dutch singer, André Hazes, and also pointed to existing personal loss as the major cause.

Philip Rayner, Senior Lecturer in Media Communications at the University of Gloucestershire, saw the reaction to Svidersky's death as pointing to a change of social interactions that had occurred in the previous few years, and in particular the phenomenon of almost immediate global dissemination of information, but that in her case a significant aspect was also "the sense of community and shared emotional response".

Richard Watson, in his book Future files: the 5 trends that will shape the next 50 years, discussed "digital immortality" through internet records, and cited Svidersky, whose MySpace page would "remain, potentially forever" as her "digital afterlife". Der Spiegel said that Svidersky was famous, albeit posthumously, in a new way—not via traditional media as in the time of Andy Warhol, but as with the Star Wars Kid through the web page/blog/video and google hits.

A memorial video In Memory of Anna Svidersky on YouTube, which has now been removed, was viewed more than 3,000,000 times by April 2011, five years after the incident.
