= Włodzimierz Różański =

Polish field hockey player

Personal information
- Nationality: Polish
- Born: 7 June 1938 Poznań, Poland
- Died: 14 April 2006 (aged 67) Poznań, Poland

Sport
- Sport: Field hockey

Włodzimierz Różański (7 June 1938 – 14 April 2006) was a Polish field hockey player. He competed in the men's tournament at the 1960 Summer Olympics.
