= Mustapha Adnane =

Moroccan weightlifter (1931–2006)

Personal information
- Nationality: Moroccan
- Born: 1931 Casablanca, Morocco
- Died: 28 April 2006 (aged 74–75)
- Height: 1.68 m (5 ft 6 in)

Sport
- Sport: Weightlifting

Mustapha Adnane (1931 – 28 April 2006) was a Moroccan weightlifter. He competed in the 1960 and 1964 Summer Olympics.
