= Félix Siby =

Gabonese politician

Félix Siby (January 18, 1942 – April 29, 2006) was a Gabonese politician. He was born in Setté Cama, Gabon and died in the capital, Libreville.

== Life ==
Siby had a doctorate in applied economics from the Universite de Paris IX Dauphine. He began his career as a civil servant. In 1973 he became director of the cabinet of President Omar Bongo. Later the same year, he became secretary general to the Société Gabonaise de Raffinage (SOGARA), a post which he occupied until 1996.

== Government posts ==
- Ministre de la marine marchande et de la pêche (Minister of merchant navy and fisheries), 1997–1999
- Ministre de la planification, de la programmation du développement et de l'aménagement du territoire (Minister of planning and development), 1999–2002.
- Ministre de la marine marchande, chargé des équipements portuaires (Minister of merchant navy), 2002–2004.
- Deputy of Ndogo in the province of Gamba, 2004.
