= William Roberts (veteran) =

William Roberts (29 September 1900 – 30 April 2006), often known as Bill Roberts, was one of the final surviving British veterans of the First World War.

As a fourteen-year-old boy Roberts was present in Hartlepool during the Imperial German Navy's bombardment.

After Roberts' father was killed in the Battle of the Somme in 1916, he joined the RFC. William, who worked as an aircraft fitter, claimed to have flown with T. E. Lawrence.

After the war he became a local authority transport manager.

Roberts lived in Jacksdale, Nottinghamshire, until his death in April 2006 at the age of 105.
