= Walter W. Ristow =

American curator (1908–2006)

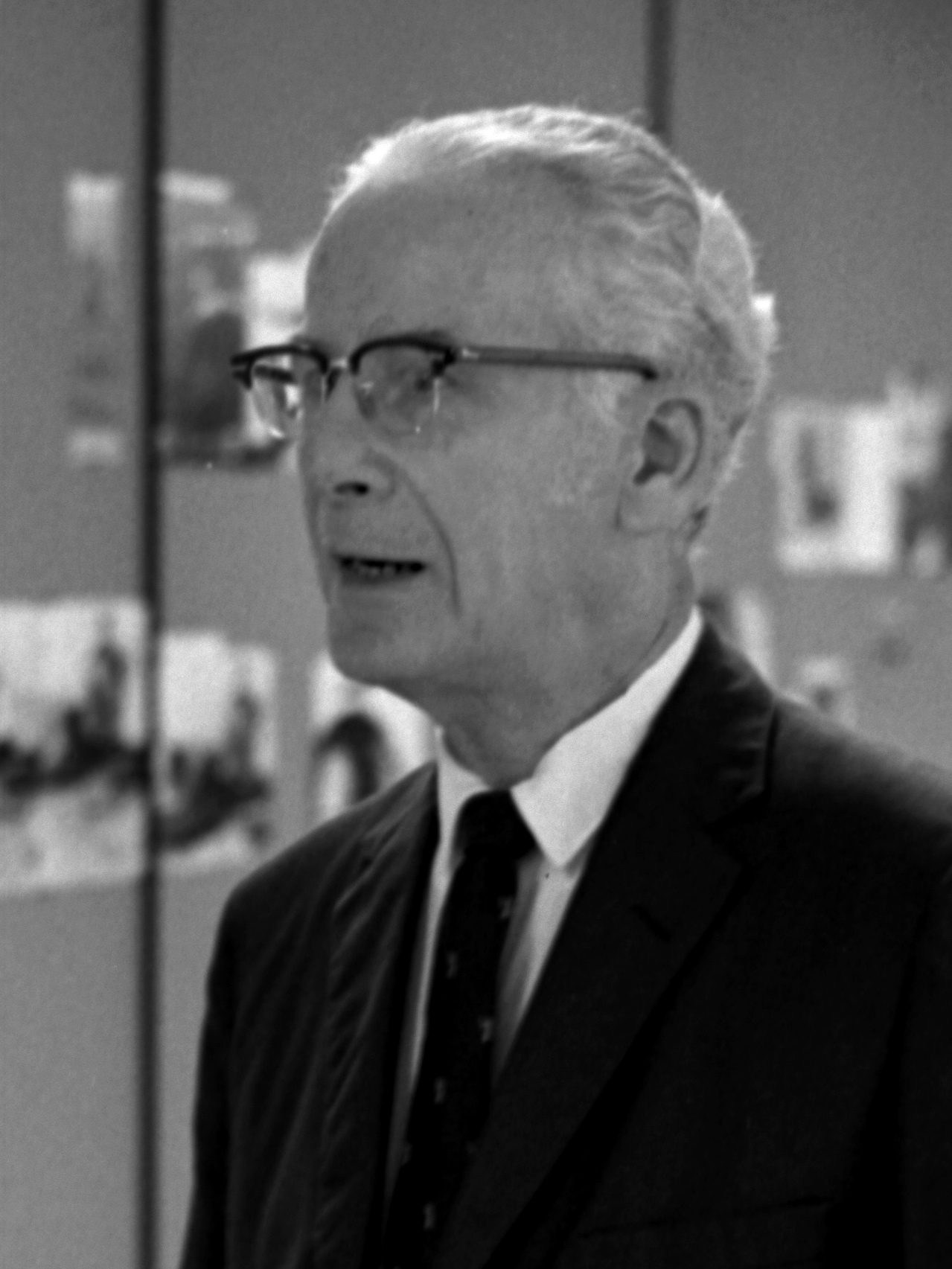
- Ristow in 1969
- Born: Walter William Ristow; April 20, 1908; La Crosse, Wisconsin
- Died: April 3, 2006 (aged 97); Mitchellville, Maryland
- Occupations: librarian, cartographer

Walter William Ristow (April 20, 1908 in La Crosse, Wisconsin – April 3, 2006 in Mitchellville, Maryland) was the head librarian of the map library at the New York Public Library and later the Library of Congress.

== Career ==
Ristow graduated with a degree in geography from the University of Wisconsin in 1931. He went on to earn a master's degree in geography from Oberlin College and a doctorate from Clark University. Ristow joined the Library of Congress in 1946 and became chief of its map department in 1967. He retired in 1978.

In 1979, Ristow helped establish the Washington Map Society. The Society gives an award in his name annually to an author of "a paper in the field of cartographic history or map librarianship."

== Publications and papers ==
- Ristow, Walter W. 1997. "The French-Smith map and gazetteer of New York State [1859]". Quarterly Journal of the Library of Congress. 36: 68-90.
- Ristow, Walter W. 1997. "Aborted American atlases". Quarterly Journal of the Library of Congress. 36: 320-345.
- Ristow, Walter William. 1986. World directory of map collections. Munchen: Verlag Dokumentation. Compiled by the Geography and Map Libraries Sub-Section; edited by Walter W. Ristow.
- American maps and map makers: Commercial Cartography in the Nineteenth Century (Wayne State University Press, 1985) ISBN 0814317685
- Ristow, Walter W. 1983. Cartography and Robinson then and now. Madison, Wis: University. Presented at the dedication of the Arthur H. Robinson Map Library at the University of Wisconsin—Madison on November 4, 1982. Reprinted from the Special Libraries Association, Geography and Map Division Bulletin, no. 132 (June 1983), p. 8-16.
- The emergence of maps in libraries (Elliot's Books, 1980) ISBN 0720116201
- Ristow, Walter W. 1979. Cartography of the Battle of Bunker Hill. Lisboa: Junta de Invesitgações Científicas do Ultramar. "Separata da Revista da Universidade de Coimbra, vol. XXVII - Ano 1979 - pág. 263-279." Pages also numbered 265-279 of the Revista ...
- Ristow, Walter William. 1979. The Ebeling-Sotzmann Atlas von Nordamerika: [Vortrag gehalten auf d. VIII. Internationalen Konferenz zur Geschichte der Kartographie, Berlin, 1979]. "The Ebeling-Sotzmann Atlas von Nordamerika : [Vortrag gehalten auf d. VIII. Internationalen Konferenz zur Geschichte der Kartographie, Berlin, 1979]".
- Ristow, Walter W. 1978. "The Hauslab-Liechtenstein Map Collection". The Quarterly Journal of the Library of Congress. 35 (2): 108-138.
- Ristow, Walter W. 1978. "Worlds of Christmas Greetings". The Quarterly Journal of the Library of Congress. 35 (4): 234-241. From an original painting by Norman Rockwell. Reproduced with permission from the Saturday Evening Post, 1926 The Curtis Publishing Company.
- Ristow, Walter William. 1978. The greening of map librarianship. S.l: s.n.]. "Reprinted from SLA Geography and Map Division Bulletin, no. 111, March 1978."
- Buttery, L. M., and Walter W. Ristow. 1978. The 1823 John Melish map of the United States. Oklahoma City: [The Author. "March 27, 1978." "[Prepared] for Western Heritage Center Library, National Cowboy Hall of Fame." Appendix contains reprint of an article from A la carte, John Melish and his map of the United States, by Walter W. Ristow, that originally appeared in the September 1972 issue of the Library of Congress Quarterly journal of Current acquisitions.
- Ristow, Walter W., and R. A. Skelton. Nautical charts on vellum in the Library of Congress. (library of Congress, 1977) ISBN 0844401811
- Ristow, Walter W. 1977. "ROBERT MILLS'S ATLAS OF SOUTH CAROLINA". The Quarterly Journal of the Library of Congress. 34 (1): 52-66. John Wilson's 1822 map of South Carolina, as engraved by Henry S. Tanner.* Ristow, Walter W. 1976. World directory of map collections. Munchen: Verlag Dokumentation. Compiled by the Geography and Map Libraries Sub-Section; edited by Walter W. Ristow.
- Ristow, Walter W. 1976. Map library education in the United States and Canada. [United States]: [s.n.].
- Ristow, Walter W. 1975. "Lithography and maps, 1796-1850". Hoofdstuk in: Five centuries of map printing / ed. by David Woodward. - Chicago, Ill., [etc.]: University of Chicago Press, 1975. P. 77-112.
- Ristow, Walter W. 1975. The Geography and map division [of the Library of Congress]: A guide to its collections and services. Washington: Library of Congress.
- Ristow, Walter W. 1974. "Cartographic Information Services of the Library of Congress". Cartography and Geographic Information Science. 1 (2): 125-130.
- Ristow, Walter W. 1974. "Dutch Polder Maps". The Quarterly Journal of the Library of Congress. 31 (3): 136-149.
- Walter W. Ristow papers, La Crosse, Wisconsin Public Library, library archives: articles by Walter Ristow on maps and their use in libraries.
