= Carmen Acevedo Vega =

Ecuadorian poet, writer, and journalist (1913–2006)

- Born: July 16, 1913; Guayaquil, Ecuador
- Died: April 28, 2006 (aged 92)
- Occupation: Writer

Carmen Acevedo Vega (July 16, 1913 – April 28, 2006) was an Ecuadorian poet, writer, and journalist.

== Biography ==
Carmen Acevedo Vega was born in Guayaquil on July 16, 1913. Her father was José L. Acevedo Quiroz, a writer and poet from Quito. Her mother was Obdulia Vega Andrade, from Cuenca. Carmen Acevedo Vega was born in Guayaquil on July 16, 1913. Her father, José L. Acevedo Quiroz, was a writer and poet from Quito. Her mother, Obdulia Vega Andrade, was born in Cuenca. She lived her first years in a farm owned by his father in Naranjal. Years later, her family moved to Guayaquil, where she completed her elementary studies at the Colegio la Inmaculada in Guayaquil. She later had to drop from high school due to social prejudices of the time.

When she was six years old, Carmen Acevedo Vega was taken to "San Vicente" farmland, which belonged to her father. At that moment, nature had an impact on her and she got introduced to the peasant life. During this time, she acquired a peculiar habit: she would never cry. She developed this habit because her parents would tell her older siblings that men must not cry, if they do so, they would look like women. This comment made her wonder why only women had the right to cry. Therefore, she resolved to not cry over anything.

She first approached literature, as well as recitation and singing, because of a teacher of hers from Guayaquil. She was considered a quiet, anxious, shy girl at school and home. She focused most of her attention and time to her studies. She was the best of her class in gymnastics and olympics and got the highest grades. The theater world highly drew her attention; she was amused by theatrical performances, longing to be chosen for literary evenings. At home, she and her brother would imitate performers of the Comedian Children's Company that would showcase themselves at the Teatro Colón.

After she finished elementary school, she completed only two years of high school. Her father did not allow her to go to Vicente Rocafuerte School. Carmen had to stay at home, where she spent most of her time reading books. She then developed an interest in biographies, novels and classic literature. Her father helped motivate her to write her first poems, which would often talk about death and disappointment. She was also inspired by her father's friends, writers and musicians who would frequently visit their house.

In 1929, she published a few poems in the Guayaquil magazines "Ideal” and "Perú". When Telmo Vaca del Pozo heard of her writings, he went to Carmen and advised her that being a poet would be very hard, especially because she was a woman, she would face strong criticism. After listening to this, she decided to not publish any more of her poems, and instead dedicated herself to singing. Her father supported her and encouraged her to study music. Carlos Alberto González and Francisco Paredes Herrera became her private teachers. Her father also wanted Carmen to become an actress, but her mother strongly opposed the thought. Carmen would only sing at family evenings; and it was around this time that she learned to sew and embroider. She entered the Music Conservatory under the order of Maestro Pedro Pablo Traversari, and managed to study up to a second year of piano, reciting, and singing.

In 1935 she became part of a writing team for the newspaper “El Universo”. She resigned in 1938 in order to move to Cuenca where she worked for the newspaper “El Mercurio” instead. A year later she returned to Guayaquil, while continuing her work for the local newspaper in Cuenca. In 1945, she married Vicente Idrovo Valdivieso, whom she divorced in 1953. They had a son named Luis Galo Idrovo Acevedo.

The experiences she had in her youth are evoked in her verses . She is known for composing works on social themes and protest, through sensitive, rhythmic and lyrical verses.

She died in Guayaquil on April 28, 2006.

== Memberships ==
Carmen Acevedo Vega was a member of many Ecuadorian institutions, including:

- Casa de la Cultura Ecuatoriana: Autonomous institution of cultural management in the Republic of Ecuador. It works since 1944 and has its main headquarters in the city of Quito.
- Association of Journalists of Guayas
- Association of Journalists of Guayaquil
- National Confederation of Journalists of Ecuador: created in September 1975, is an entity of private law, with legal status, and its headquarters is rotating. The Federation is governed by the Law on Professional Exercise of Journalists, statutes and regulations.
- Metropolitan Cultural Center of Quito: cultural institution of the city of Quito, capital of Ecuador. Its main headquarters is located in the historic center of the city, in one of the several monumental buildings that helped earn the title of the first world heritage, by UNESCO in 1978.
- Union of American Women: The Union of American Women was created in 1934 by a group of Latin American women; but it has always had its main headquarters in the United States, and some of the current members are North American. Today, there are branches of the Union in almost all countries of the Western Hemisphere.
- National Union of Ecuadorian Women: In 1960 the National Union of Women of Ecuador (UNME in Spanish) was created. It exists to this day and has branches in several provinces of the country. The purpose of UNME is providing "civic training to women".

== Awards ==
- In 1952 she received the "Ondas Azuayas" radio station's Poetry Recital Contest Prize.
- In 1973 the Municipality of Guayaquil awarded her the "Medal for Literary Merit" in recognition of her cultural and educational work.
- In 1976 the program Antena Pedagógica named her "Teacher of the Year".
- In 1996 she was awarded the First Class Cultural Merit Award, issued by the Ministry of Education and Culture of Ecuador.

== Works ==
- Camino sin Retorno (1953)
- Espacio y Luz (1961): A collection of poems dedicated to women and children of Ecuador. It was published by the University of Guayaquil. Some poems are: “Tristeza por la flor caída,” “Niños en el desamparo,” “Los cara de hambre,” “Nuestra tierra.”
- Latitud Amarga (1968)
- Lauros de Guayaquil (1973): A book of poems dedicated to Guayaquil. It was published by Casa de la Cultura Ecuatoriana Núcleo del Guayas. It has a total of 12 poems such as: “Lauros de Guayaquil,” “Canto a la Bandera,” “Canto al Estero Salado,” “Canto a los Próceres,” “A Guayaquil, mi tierra.”
- En los Horizontes del Paisaje Azul (1978): It's a compilation of poems written when the author lost her parents. It was published by Casa de la Cultura Ecuatoriana Núcleo del Guayas.It has a total of 27 poems, among them we can find: “Soneto a la poesía,” “Dejadme abrir las alas,” “Noche de insomnio,” “Sagrada pena,” and “Una nube de añil.”
- Perfiles Humanos, a collection of short stories previously published between 1956 and 1980
- Alba Eterna
- Páginas de Ayer
- Parcela Azul
- Cantos Dispersos
- Poemas Nada Más
- En el Peregrinaje
