= Checkers speech =

1952 television address by Richard Nixon

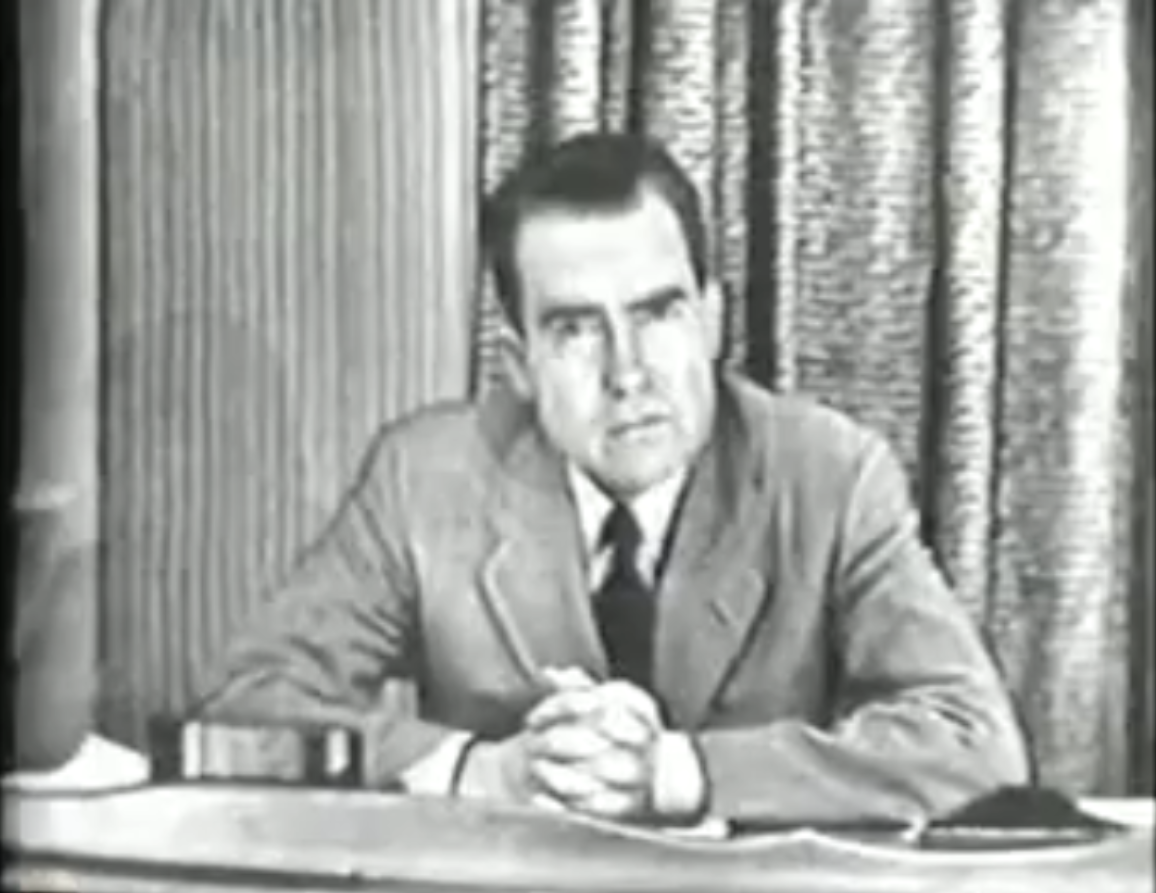
- Nixon delivering the speech
- Date: September 23, 1952
- Time: 6:30 pm (Pacific Time, UTC–8)
- Duration: 30 minutes
- Venue: El Capitan Theatre
- Location: Los Angeles, California, U.S.; 34.1027°N 118.3270°W
- Also known as: Fund speech
- Type: Speech
- Participants: Senator Richard Nixon
- Outcome: Nixon remains on Republican ticket, after receiving a wave of public support; Nixon eventually elected Vice President alongside Dwight D. Eisenhower
- Media: video, audio, transcript

The Checkers speech or Fund speech was an address made on September 23, 1952, by then-Senator Richard Nixon, six weeks before the 1952 United States presidential election in which he was the Republican nominee for Vice President. Nixon had been accused of improprieties relating to a fund established by his backers to reimburse him for his political expenses. His place was in doubt on the Republican ticket, so he flew to Los Angeles and delivered a half-hour television address in which he defended himself, attacked his opponents, and urged the audience to contact the Republican National Committee (RNC) to tell them whether he should remain on the ticket. During the speech, he stated that he intended to keep one gift, regardless of the outcome: a black-and-white Cocker Spaniel that his children had named Checkers, thus giving the address its popular name.

Nixon came from a family of modest means, as he related in the address, and he had spent his time after law school in the military, campaigning for office, and serving in Congress. After his successful 1950 Senate campaign, his backers continued to raise money to finance his political activities. These contributions went to reimburse him for travel costs, postage for political mailings which he did not have franked, and similar expenses. Such a fund was not illegal at the time, but Nixon had made a point of attacking government corruption which exposed him to charges that he might be giving special favors to the contributors.

The press became aware of the fund in September 1952, two months after Nixon's selection as General Dwight D. Eisenhower's running mate, and the story quickly grew until it threatened his place on the ticket. In an attempt to turn the tide of public opinion, Nixon broke off a whistle-stop tour of the West Coast to fly to Los Angeles and make a television and radio broadcast to the nation; the RNC raised the $75,000 to buy the television time. The idea for the Checkers reference came from Franklin D. Roosevelt's Fala speech, given eight years to the day before Nixon's address, in which Roosevelt mocked Republican claims that he had sent a destroyer to fetch his dog, Fala, when Fala was supposedly left behind in the Aleutian Islands.

Nixon's speech was seen and heard by about 60 million Americans, including the largest television audience to that time, and it led to an outpouring of public support. The RNC and other political offices received millions of telegrams and phone calls supporting Nixon. He was retained on the ticket, which swept to victory weeks later in November 1952. The Checkers speech was an early example of a politician using television to appeal directly to the electorate, but it has sometimes been mocked or denigrated. The term Checkers speech has come more generally to mean a personal, emotionally-charged speech given by a politician in order to win support from the public.

== Background ==
In 1950, California Congressman Richard Nixon was elected to the Senate, defeating Representative Helen Gahagan Douglas. With the six-year term secured, Nixon campaign officials discussed how to further his career. Campaign manager Murray Chotiner and campaign chairman Bernie Brennan proposed a year-round campaign for the next six years, leading up to a re-election bid in 1956. Nixon's Southern California campaign treasurer Dana Smith suggested what became known as "the Fund," to be administered by himself, which would pay for Nixon's political expenses.

As Smith wrote to one potential contributor, money donated to the Fund was to be used for:

Transportation and hotel expenses to cover trips to California more frequently than his mileage allowance permits. Payment of airmail and long-distance phone charges above his allowance ... Preparation of material ... to send out to the people ... who have supported him ... Defraying expenses of his Christmas cards to the people who worked in his campaign or contributed financially ... paying for getting out material for radio broadcasts and television programs. ... and various other similar items.

As a senator, Nixon received an annual salary of $12,500 (equivalent to $155,000 in 2025). While he received an expense allowance of over $75,000, more than most senators received (because California was one of the most populous states), that money went to pay his staff of twelve and to cover the cost of stationery, telephone service, telegrams, and other office expenses. It also paid for the one set of round-trip airline tickets between Washington, D.C., and California that Nixon was allowed to buy for himself and his family at taxpayer expense each Congressional session.

Nixon later characterized the attitude of his backers and aides as, "We want you to start campaigning right now for 1956, and we think the way to do it is to have available the funds to make speeches, make trips to California, and so forth." Contributors were drawn only from his early supporters, and contributions were limited to $1,000 (equivalent to $12,000 in 2025). Nixon was not to be informed of the names of contributors; however, the fundraising letter stated that Nixon "will of course be very appreciative of your continuing interest". By October 30, 1951, some $16,000 (equivalent to $198,000 in 2025) had been raised, of which Nixon had spent approximately $12,000 (equivalent to $149,000 in 2025), principally from contributors in the Los Angeles area. The senator's Christmas card expense for 1950 and 1951 totaled $4,237.54 (equivalent to $52,600 in 2025). Despite the initial fundraising success, only $2,200 could be raised from November 1951 to July 1952, and an engraving bill was unpaid pending a hoped-for contribution of $500.

== Fund crisis ==
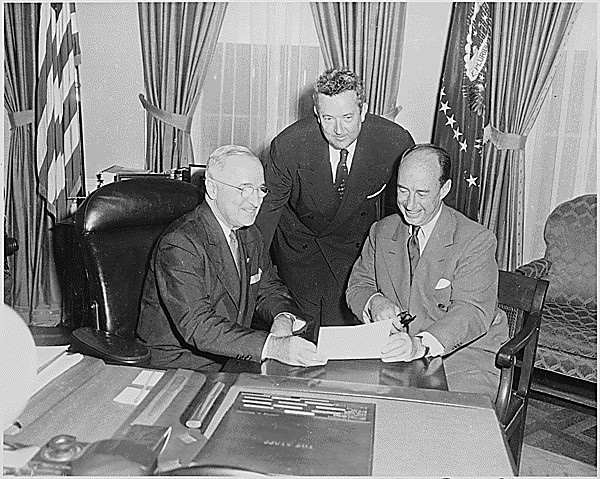
Then-President Harry Truman (D) (left, seated) meets with then-Governor Adlai Stevenson (D-IL) (right, seated) and then-Senator John Sparkman (D-AL)

In 1952, the Republicans chose Dwight D. Eisenhower as their presidential candidate, who then selected Nixon as his running mate, while the Democrats nominated Illinois Governor Adlai Stevenson for president and Alabama Senator John Sparkman for vice president. The California delegation to the 1952 Republican National Convention, including Nixon, had been pledged to the state's "favorite son" candidate, Governor Earl Warren, who hoped to gain the presidential nomination in a brokered convention. Warren failed in his attempt to gain the nomination, and his supporters alleged that Nixon had worked behind the scenes to nominate Eisenhower despite his pledge to support Warren, and accused him of political opportunism for accepting the vice-presidential nomination. A disgruntled Warren supporter from Pasadena leaked the Fund story to several reporters.

Nixon had campaigned for public integrity in his time in the Senate, even calling for the resignation of his own party chairman, Guy Gabrielson, when the latter was implicated in a loan scandal. By using such "indignant rhetoric," Nixon had "weakened his own position" when the Fund crisis erupted.

=== Development of the story ===
On September 14, Nixon was asked about the Fund by reporter Peter Edson of the Newspaper Enterprise Association after the senator completed an appearance on Meet the Press. Nixon told Edson that the Fund was set up by his supporters to pay political expenses, explained that he had made no effort to find out the names of the donors, and referred Edson to Smith for further information. Edson, and other reporters, did contact Smith, who answered questions about the Fund. Three days later, Nixon's campaign train, the "Dick Nixon Special," left Pomona, California, on a whistle-stop campaign tour of the West Coast and Rocky Mountain states.

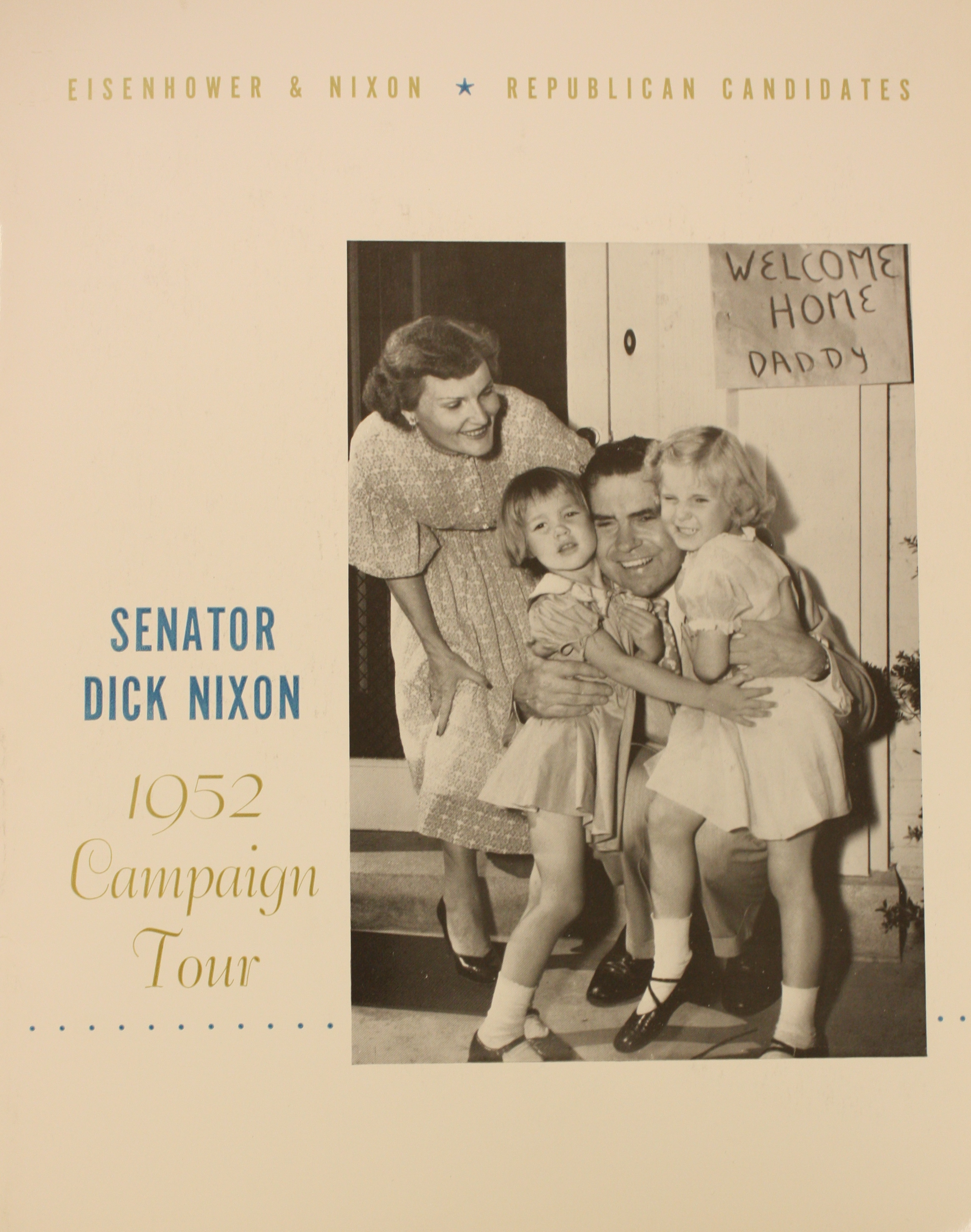
Menu from "Dick Nixon Special"

Edson's column on the 18th, which included lengthy quotes by Smith on the supposed safeguards in the Fund, was later called by Nixon, "fair and objective". However, Leo Katcher of the New York Post interviewed Smith and wrote a story under the headline "Secret Rich Men's Trust Fund Keeps Nixon in Style Far Beyond His Salary" and referred to the Fund donors as a "millionaires' club". Nixon later praised Katcher's younger brother Edward, also a reporter, for his objectivity, but told him, "your brother Leo is a son of a bitch."

When the Dick Nixon Special arrived in Bakersfield, California, that day, Nixon, still oblivious to the developing furor, made a speech promoting the Republican ticket, and backing local congressman Thomas H. Werdel. After the speech, Republican activist Keith McCormac showed Nixon the Post story, which had been picked up by United Press under the headline "Nixon Scandal Fund". According to McCormac, the senator collapsed into his seat in shock, and needed the help of Murray Chotiner, who was again Nixon's campaign manager, and Congressman Patrick J. Hillings (a Nixon confidant who had succeeded him in the House of Representatives) to return to his compartment.

Democratic National Committee Chairman Stephen A. Mitchell called for Nixon's resignation from the ticket, saying that "Senator Nixon knows that [the Fund] is morally wrong. General Eisenhower knows that it is morally wrong. The American people know that it is morally wrong." On the other hand, Republican Senator Karl Mundt called the story "a filthy maneuver by left-wingers, fellow travelers, and former communists". Nixon issued a written statement explaining that the fund was to pay political expenses, in lieu of charging them to the taxpayer. Newspapers printed increasingly lurid accounts of the Fund and its beneficiary. The Sacramento Bee termed Nixon, "the pet protégé of a special interest group of rich southern Californians ... their front man, if not, indeed, their lobbyist". The Pasadena Star-News, meanwhile, reported that one contributor had been appealed to on the grounds that the Nixon family needed a larger home and could not afford a maid.

The train reached Marysville, California, on the morning of September 19, and Nixon gave a speech from the rear platform. As the train pulled out, while he remained on the rear platform, someone in the crowd yelled, "What about the $16,000?" (the amount then thought to have been contributed to the Fund). Nixon had the train stopped, and responded that he had been told that if he continued on his political course, "crooks and communists" would smear him. He told the crowd that the Fund had saved the taxpayer money, since it paid for matters that could have been paid for through his Senate expense allowance. He promised to throw the "crooks and communists" out of Washington.

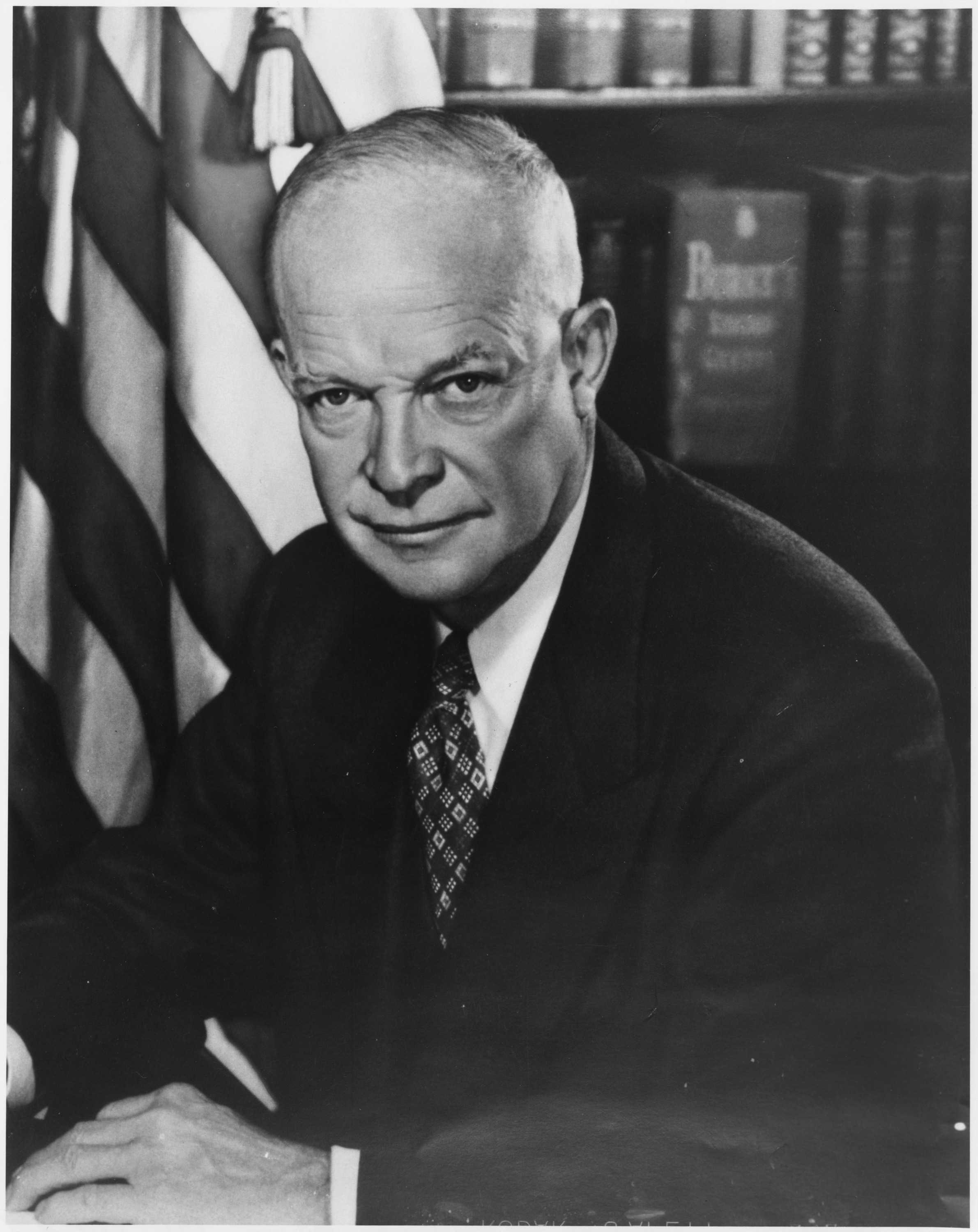
Dwight D. Eisenhower

Eisenhower was on his own train, the Look Ahead, Neighbor, stumping through Missouri, and on the morning of the 19th, his campaign staff made him aware of the gathering storm. Eisenhower publicly called upon Nixon to release all documents relating to the Fund, somewhat to the dismay of Chotiner, who wondered, "What more does the general require than the senator's word?" Eisenhower aides contacted the senior Republican senator from California, William Knowland, and persuaded him to fly from Hawaii to join the Eisenhower train and be available as a potential replacement running mate.

By this time, Nixon campaign headquarters was receiving a flood of messages, calling on Nixon to resign from the ticket. When Eisenhower's train stopped for the candidate to make speeches, he faced protesters with signs reading "Donate Here to Help Poor Richard Nixon". The influential The Washington Post and New York Herald-Tribune both called for Nixon to leave the ticket, facts which Chotiner did not tell his candidate; Nixon learned them from a questioning reporter. Over 100 newspapers would editorialize about the Fund on the morning of September 20, opinion running two to one against Nixon. As his train stopped in Eugene, Oregon, Nixon was met with protestors' signs referencing his wife: "Pat, What Are You Going to Do With the Bribe Money?" and "No Mink Coats for Nixon—Just Cold Cash". He angrily responded with a phrase which would be echoed in the Checkers speech. After stating that there were no mink coats for the Nixons, he said that he was "proud of the fact that Pat Nixon wears a good Republican cloth coat, and she's going to continue to".

Politicians from both parties opined on the propriety of the Fund and on what Nixon should do, most in accord with their political affiliation. Democratic presidential candidate Stevenson, though, publicly reserved judgment, leading Chotiner to suspect "that Stevenson is afraid of something here. I bet he has something to hide."

=== Idea for a speech ===
On September 20, Republican National Committee official Bob Humphreys first suggested that Nixon give a televised speech to the nation to explain his position. RNC chairman and future Postmaster General Arthur Summerfield thought well of the idea, but was concerned about the expense. That evening, Nixon conferred with his aides, who unanimously urged him not to resign from the ticket. Humphreys called Chotiner at Nixon's hotel in Portland, Oregon that evening, and the campaign manager realized that the broadcast was the best opportunity for Nixon to make his case. Humphreys suggested Nixon appear on Meet the Press, but Chotiner rejected the suggestion, insisting that his candidate must have complete control of the broadcast "without interruption by possibly unfriendly press questions". Humphreys mentioned that Summerfield was concerned about the cost of a television broadcast, but Chotiner noted that the cost of reprinting all campaign materials to reflect a change on the ticket would be far more than that of a telecast.

The avalanche of editorial opinion continued the following day, Sunday, September 21, but Eisenhower continued to withhold judgment. Eisenhower considered asking retired Supreme Court Justice Owen Roberts to evaluate the legality of the Fund, but time constraints ruled him out. Eisenhower decided to ask the Los Angeles law firm Gibson, Dunn & Crutcher for a legal opinion, while asking the accounting firm Price Waterhouse to audit the Fund's records. Nixon, meanwhile, was encouraged by a supportive telegram from his mother and discouraged by one from former Minnesota governor Harold Stassen urging him to resign from the ticket. New York Governor Thomas E. Dewey, a Nixon supporter, called to tell Nixon that most Eisenhower aides favored his removal, and that if Nixon made the telecast, he should call for people to write to express their opinions. Dewey added that if the response was not strongly pro-Nixon, then he should leave the ticket.

Nixon finally got a call from Eisenhower at 10:00 pm, Pacific Time, Sunday night. Eisenhower expressed a reluctance to see him leave the ticket, and felt that he should have a chance to make his case to the American people. Nixon enquired if Eisenhower would be able to make a decision on whether to keep him as the running mate immediately after the broadcast, and when Eisenhower equivocated, he angrily burst out: "General, there comes a time in matters like this when you've either got to shit or get off the pot." Eisenhower replied that it might take three or four days to gauge public reaction.

=== Preparation and setting ===
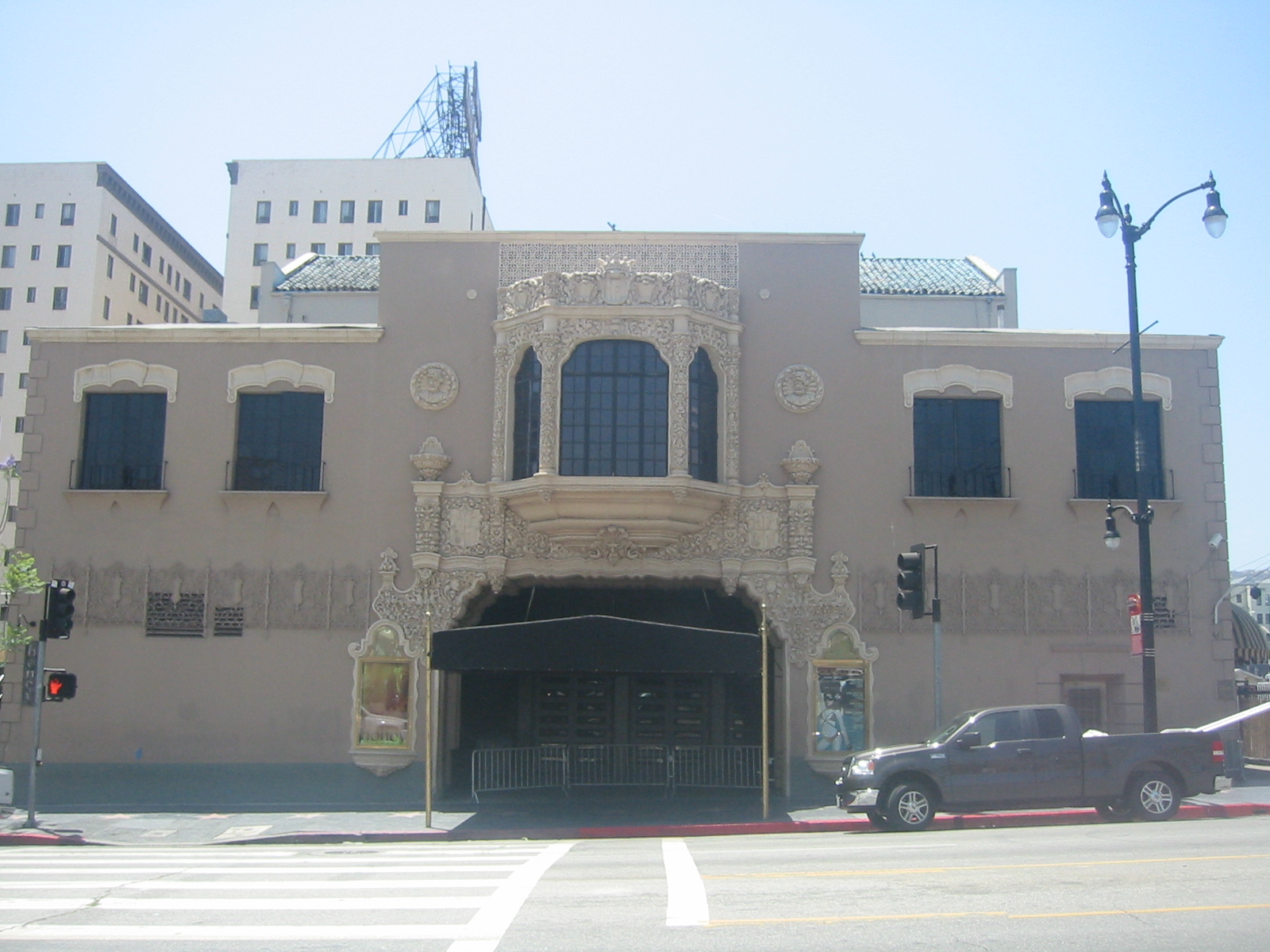
The El Capitan Theatre, now known as the Avalon Hollywood

Through the night to the morning of September 22, Eisenhower and Nixon aides arranged the speech. The RNC worked to raise the $75,000 (equivalent to $910,000 in 2025) needed to buy the half-hour of television time, while the Eisenhower staff secured sixty NBC stations to telecast the speech, with radio coverage from CBS and Mutual. The Nixon staff initially advocated a half-hour that evening, Monday, September 22, to follow the immensely popular I Love Lucy show, but when Nixon indicated he could not be ready that soon, settled for 6:30 pm Tuesday night, 9:30 pm in the East, following the almost equally popular Texaco Star Theater, starring Milton Berle. The campaign arranged to use the El Capitan Theatre, in Hollywood, where several NBC variety shows were then broadcast, since its lighting was superior to that of NBC Radio City West. Nixon told the press that he would be addressing the nation on television, but refused to take any questions about what he might say.

On Monday morning, Nixon flew to Los Angeles, making notes for his speech aboard the plane. He jotted down the line he had said in Eugene regarding his wife's coat. He made notes concerning the family finances, upsetting Pat Nixon, who asked why people had to know their financial details. Nixon responded that people in politics live in a fishbowl. He recalled the Fala speech, in which Franklin Roosevelt had sarcastically responded to Republican claims he had sent a destroyer to fetch his dog, Fala, and remembered the dog his children had recently received: A Texas traveling salesman named Lou Carrol had read a report that Pat Nixon said her children Tricia and Julie "longed" for a dog, and his own dog, an American Cocker Spaniel, had just had a litter. After a telegram exchange, he crated the puppy and shipped it by rail to the Nixons, and six-year-old Tricia Nixon named the dog "Checkers". Nixon decided that including the anecdote evoking FDR would needle his enemies and delight his friends.

When the plane reached Los Angeles, Nixon secluded himself in a suite in The Ambassador Hotel, letting no one except his wife, Chotiner, and attorney and adviser William P. Rogers have any hint what he was planning. He called two professors he knew at his alma mater, Whittier College, seeking appropriate Abraham Lincoln quotes. They called back with two suggestions, one of which he used. Unwilling to have his message filtered, Nixon adamantly refused to provide the media with any advance text of his speech, convinced that it would reduce the size of his audience. Without any hard information on what would be said during the speech, rumors flew through the media. UPI reported that Nixon would resign from the ticket well before the scheduled time for the speech. On the evening of the 22nd, the media broke the story that Democratic nominee Adlai Stevenson had a similar fund, as Chotiner had predicted. The Stevenson information had been leaked by Bob Humphreys at the RNC, but as he later ruefully noted, "Nobody paid much attention to it."

The morning of the 23rd, the day of the speech, brought the reports from the lawyers, who opined that it was legal for a senator to accept expense reimbursements, and from the accountants, who stated that there was no evidence of misappropriation of money. The Fund was to be dissolved, and gifts accepted since Nixon's nomination were to be accounted for as campaign contributions. Despite the reports, Eisenhower had second thoughts about relying on the success of the speech. He told an aide to call Governor Dewey, who was to call Nixon and instruct him to close his speech with his resignation from the ticket. Believing they had resolved the situation at last, Eisenhower and his staff had a relaxed dinner and began to prepare for his own speech that evening, before 15,000 Republican supporters in Cleveland.

At 4:30 pm, Nixon, Chotiner, and Rogers were discussing where the public should be told to send their responses to the speech, when a Dewey aide telephoned for Nixon. Reluctantly, suspecting the reason for the call, Chotiner brought Nixon to the phone to speak with the New York governor. Dewey told Nixon that Eisenhower's aides were unanimous that Nixon must resign, though Dewey did not agree, and that Nixon was to so state at the end of his telecast. Nixon asked what Eisenhower wanted him to do. Dewey hedged, stating that he had not spoken with the presidential candidate himself, but that the word had come from such close aides to Eisenhower that the demand had to represent the general's view. Nixon replied that it was very late for him to change his remarks; Dewey assured him he need not do so, but simply add at the end his resignation from the ticket and his insistence that Eisenhower accept it. Dewey suggested he even announce his resignation from the Senate and his intent to run in the special election which would follow—he was sure Nixon would be returned with a huge majority, thus vindicating him. Nixon remained silent for some time, and when Dewey asked him what he would do, the senator told him that he did not know, and if Eisenhower's aides wanted to find out, they could watch just like everyone else. Before slamming down the receiver, Nixon added, "And tell them I know something about politics, too!"

Nixon, somewhat dazed by the conversation with Dewey, dressed for the speech and reviewed his notes. Chotiner came into Nixon's room, and told him that if he was forced off the ticket, Chotiner would call a huge press conference and reveal all the maneuvering that had led to Nixon's departure; Chotiner added that the resulting furor would mean nothing to either of the two men, since they would be through with politics anyway. Nixon later stated that Chotiner's promise broke the tension and gave him a needed lift. The Nixons and the campaign staff journeyed to the El Capitan, where they were met by a cheering group of Young Republicans on the sidewalk outside, including future Nixon White House Chief of Staff H. R. Haldeman. In Cleveland, General and Mamie Eisenhower, with the general's aides, prepared to watch the speech on television in the manager's office above the Cleveland Public Auditorium, where the presidential candidate was to speak.

== Delivering the address ==
The Checkers speech
Richard Nixon addresses the nation, September 23, 1952.

The El Capitan Theatre, at Nixon's insistence, was entirely deserted. Press members were confined to a nearby room, where they could watch on television; stenographers were standing by at the Ambassador to ensure an accurate transcript of Nixon's remarks for the press, who would be facing deadlines in the East. Chotiner and Rogers would watch from behind a screen in the theatre; Pat Nixon, wearing a dress knitted by supporters, would sit on stage a few feet from her husband. The chosen set was a "GI bedroom den" with a desk, two chairs, and bookshelves. Nixon usually preferred to work from a memorized text, but would work from notes for this speech to make the talk sound more spontaneous. Nixon spent some time practicing movements for the cameramen and finally went into the dressing room with his wife for a few minutes of solitude. He told her that he did not think he could go through with it, but she reassured him.

=== Introduction and office expenses ===
The speech opened with Nixon sitting at the desk. He began, "My fellow Americans, I come before you tonight as a candidate for the Vice Presidency, and as a man whose honesty and integrity has [sic] been questioned." Nixon indicated that he would not follow the example of the Truman Administration and ignore charges, and that the best response to a smear "is to tell the truth".

Nixon mentioned the $18,000 Fund, and that he was accused of taking money from a group of his supporters. After stating that the Fund was wrong if he had profited from it, if it had been conducted in secret, or if the contributors received special favors, he continued,

Not one cent of the $18,000 or any other money of that type ever went to me for my personal use. Every penny of it was used to pay for political expenses that I did not think should be charged to the taxpayers of the United States. It was not a secret fund. As a matter of fact, when I was on Meet the Press, some of you may have seen it last Sunday—Peter Edson came up to me after the program and he said, "Dick, what about this fund we hear about?" And I said, "Well, there's no secret about it. Go out and see Dana Smith, who was the administrator of the fund."

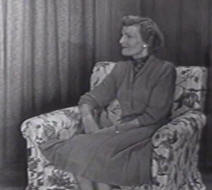
Pat Nixon watches her husband deliver the Checkers speech.

Nixon stated that no contributor to the fund got any service that an ordinary constituent would not have received, and then anticipated the skeptical questions, "Well, what did you use the fund for, Senator? Why did you have to have it?" In response to his rhetorical question, he explained salary and office allowances for senators. He went through different ways that political expenses could be met. One way was to be rich, but he stated that he was not rich. Another way was to put one's spouse on the Congressional office payroll, as, he stated, his Democratic rival, Senator John Sparkman, had done. Nixon did not feel comfortable doing that himself with so many deserving stenographers in Washington needing work, though Pat Nixon was a "wonderful stenographer" and sometimes helped out in the office as a volunteer. At this point, the camera turned from Nixon for the first time to reveal Pat Nixon sitting alongside the desk. Nixon indicated he could not continue his law practice, as some Congressmen did, due to the distance to California, and in any event he felt that practicing law while a lawmaker was a conflict of interest. Thus, he indicated, he had found that the best way to pay for political expenses not within his means was to allow contributors to do so. Nixon proffered the legal and accounting opinions as proof of his statements.

=== Family finances, coat and dog ===
Nixon, continuing to ask skeptical rhetorical questions, indicated that some might feel that even with the opinions, he might have found some way to personally benefit. In response to his own question, he detailed his background and financial situation, beginning with his birth in Yorba Linda, and the family grocery store in which the Nixon boys helped out. He alluded to his work in college and law school, his service record, and stated that at the end of the war, he and Pat Nixon had $10,000 in savings, all of it patriotically in government bonds. He gave the dollar amounts of small inheritances that the Nixons had received from relatives, before turning to their life in Washington:

We lived rather modestly. For four years we lived in an apartment in Parkfairfax, in Alexandria, Virginia. The rent was $80 a month. And we saved for the time that we could buy a house. Now, that was what we took in. What did we do with this money? What do we have today to show for it? This will surprise you, because it is so little, I suppose, as standards generally go, of people in public life.

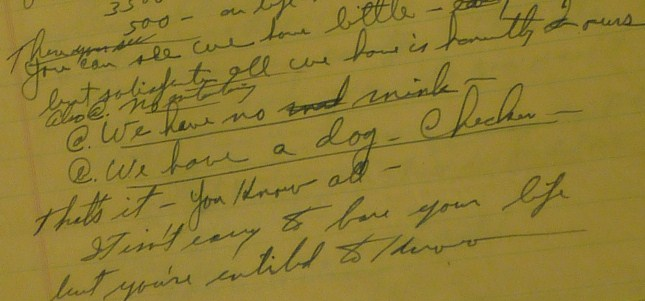
Excerpt from the notes from which Nixon delivered the Checkers speech

As Nixon discussed their finances, the telecast again showed Pat Nixon, fixedly watching her husband. Pat Nixon later stated that her rapt gaze was because she did not know exactly what he would say, and wanted to hear. Nixon detailed their assets and liabilities: the mortgaged home in Washington; the similarly mortgaged home in California, then occupied by his parents. The loans from his parents and from Riggs Bank. The borrowed-against life insurance policy on the senator; no insurance on his wife or children. The two-year-old Oldsmobile and the family furniture, and that he and his wife owned no stocks or bonds.

Well, that's about it. That's what we have and that's what we owe. It isn't very much but Pat and I have the satisfaction that every dime that we've got is honestly ours. I should say this—that Pat doesn't have a mink coat. But she does have a respectable Republican cloth coat. And I always tell her that she'd look good in anything!

While Nixon made these points, Murray Chotiner "let out shouts of glee" in his screened booth. As Chotiner exulted, Nixon moved ahead with the lines "that would give the speech its name, make it famous, and notorious":

One other thing I probably should tell you because if we don't they'll probably be saying this about me too, we did get something—a gift—after the election. A man down in Texas heard Pat on the radio mention the fact that our two youngsters would like to have a dog. And, believe it or not, the day before we left on this campaign trip we got a message from Union Station in Baltimore saying they had a package for us. We went down to get it. You know what it was?

It was a little cocker spaniel dog in a crate that he'd sent all the way from Texas. Black and white spotted. And our little girl—Tricia, the 6-year-old—named it Checkers. And you know, the kids, like all kids, love the dog and I just want to say this right now, that regardless of what they say about it, we're gonna keep it.

Nixon expressed pleasure that Stevenson, whom he termed a man who inherited wealth from his father, could run for president. But people "of modest means" must also get a chance, and he recited the quotation attributed to Lincoln: "Remember Abraham Lincoln, you remember what he said: 'God must have loved the common people—He made so many of them.'" (Note: Black 2007, p. 249. A recent book has indicated that Lincoln never said this, though it is commonly attributed to him, and this article is therefore cautious in its phrasing. See Boller & George 1989, p. 84.)

=== Attack on Democrats; request for public to write ===
Nixon then called for Stevenson to give a full accounting of his own fund, and a full list of the donors. He also called for Senator Sparkman, who, as Nixon repeated, had put his wife on the payroll, to state fully any outside income he might have had. "Because, folks, remember, a man that's to be President of the United States, a man that's to be Vice President of the United States must have the confidence of all the people. And that's why I'm doing what I'm doing, and that's why I suggest that Mr. Stevenson and Mr. Sparkman since they are under attack should do what I am doing." As Nixon made this point, Eisenhower, sitting in the Cleveland office, slammed his pencil down, realizing that he would not be allowed to be the only major party candidate whose finances would evade scrutiny. Eisenhower had benefited from a favorable Act of Congress, allowing the income from his bestselling memoirs to be considered capital gains.

Nixon warned that other smears would be made against him, and many of the same commentators who were attacking him now had also attacked him for his role in the Alger Hiss case, for which he made no apologies. He then rose to his feet, came out from behind the desk, and continued:

And as far as this is concerned, I intend to continue the fight. Why do I feel so deeply? Why do I feel that in spite of the smears, the misunderstandings, the necessity for a man to come up here and bare his soul as I have? Why is it necessary for me to continue this fight? And I want to tell you why. Because, you see, I love my country. And I think my country is in danger. And I think that the only man that can save America at this time is the man that's running for President on my ticket—Dwight Eisenhower.

You say, "Why do I think it's in danger?" and I say look at the record. Seven years of the Truman-Acheson Administration and what's happened? Six hundred million people lost to the Communists, and a war in Korea in which we have lost 117,000 American casualties.

Nixon alleged that Stevenson had downplayed the threat of communism, and was thus unfit to be president. He affirmed that Eisenhower was the only man fit to lead the country in ridding the government of corruption and communism. Reading parts of a letter from the wife of a serviceman fighting in the Korean War, who, despite her financial woes, had scraped together $10 to donate to the campaign, Nixon promised that he would never cash that check.

With less than three minutes left in the allotted time, Nixon finally addressed the question: Would he stay or would he go? He indicated that he did not think he should go. "Let me say this: I don't believe that I ought to quit because I'm not a quitter. And, incidentally, Pat's not a quitter. After all, her name was Patricia Ryan and she was born on St. Patrick's Day, (Note: Pat Nixon was born Thelma Catherine Ryan on March 16, 1912, and was called "Pat" by her family because her birth date was so close to St. Patrick's Day.) and you know the Irish never quit."

Seizing on the fact that the Republican National Convention had routinely given the RNC the power to fill vacancies on the ticket, Nixon evaded Eisenhower's power as the general again slammed his pencil down, this time breaking it:

I am submitting to the Republican National Committee tonight through this television broadcast the decision which it is theirs to make. Let them decide whether my position on the ticket will help or hurt. And I am going to ask you to help them decide. Wire and write the Republican National Committee whether you think I should stay on or whether I should get off. And whatever their decision is, I will abide by it.

But just let me say this last word. Regardless of what happens I'm going to continue this fight. I'm going to campaign up and down America until we drive the crooks and the Communists and those that defend them out of Washington.

Advancing towards the camera, he completed the speech by praising Eisenhower, "He's a great man. And a vote for Eisenhower is a vote for what's good for America." (Note: Morris 1990, p. 835. Nixon kept talking after this, but the sound was cut off (replaced by a voice over) and then the picture due to the expiration of the purchased time.)

== Aftermath ==
=== Candidates and public ===
Nixon was initially convinced that the speech was a failure. Despite the congratulations of Rogers and Chotiner, and the fact that one of the cameramen had tears running down his face, he reproved himself for not mentioning the address of the Republican National Committee. Though the Young Republicans continued their applause as the Nixon party left the theatre, he fixed on an Irish Setter running alongside his car as it pulled away from the curb. "Well, we made a hit in the dog world anyway." Despite the senator's despair, his wife was convinced that her husband had vindicated himself. Over sixty million Americans had watched or listened to the speech, including the largest television audience up to that point.

Nixon had left the Ambassador with the lobby quiet; he returned to a mob scene, and he was soon surrounded by well-wishers congratulating him. The party was able to get through to his suite, and after a few minutes of tense quiet, calls and telegrams began to pour in "from everywhere" praising the speech and urging him to remain on the ticket—but no word came from Eisenhower in Cleveland.

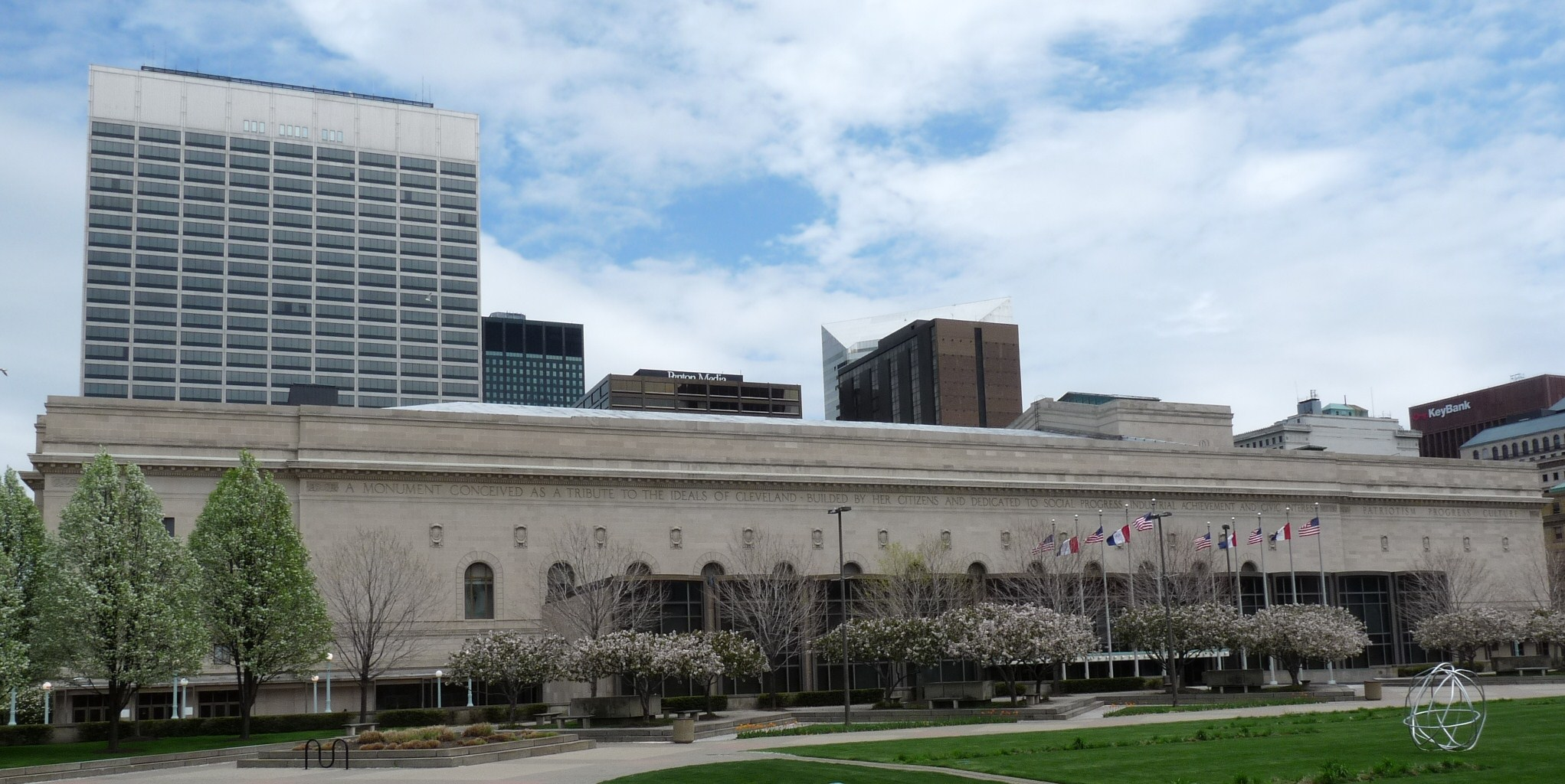
The Cleveland Public Auditorium, site of the Republican fundraiser on September 23, 1952

In Cleveland, as the speech concluded, General Eisenhower turned to RNC Chairman Summerfield, "Well, Arthur, you sure got your money's worth." Mamie Eisenhower was in tears, and the general told her that Nixon was a completely honest man. The 15,000 supporters waiting for Eisenhower to speak had heard the Checkers speech over the hall's public address system, and when Congressman George H. Bender took the microphone and asked the crowd, "Are you in favor of Nixon?", pandemonium ensued. As the crowd below chanted, "We want Nixon!", Eisenhower quickly revised his speech.

Both Eisenhower's speech to the excited crowd and telegram to his running mate were noncommittal. The general applauded his running mate for his speech, but stated that the two had to meet face to face before a final decision could be made. While Eisenhower affirmed that the RNC had the power to elect a replacement candidate, Eisenhower indicated that the committee would, most likely, be guided by his wishes. Eisenhower asked Nixon to meet with him in person in Wheeling, West Virginia, where their campaign was next scheduled to go. Eisenhower's telegram was delayed in transmission and lost among the flood being sent to Nixon's suite, and the latter learned of his running mate's position from a wire service report.

When he heard of Eisenhower's posture, Nixon's happiness at what he had finally been convinced was a tour de force turned to fury, and he stated that if the speech did not satisfy Eisenhower, nothing he could do would. He called in his secretary, Rose Mary Woods, and dictated a telegram to the RNC resigning from the ticket. As Woods left the room with her notes, Chotiner stopped her, took the sheet, and ripped it up. While Chotiner understood Nixon's rage, he felt that the resignation was premature. The campaign manager urged Nixon simply to allow the public wave of support to pressure Eisenhower. He suggested that instead of going to Wheeling as Eisenhower had requested, that they resume the train tour in Missoula, Montana. Nixon sent Eisenhower a curt acknowledgment of his telegram, and a suggestion that they meet the following week in Washington, D.C. Chotiner then called Summerfield, telling him that Nixon felt he had been abused enough, and would not meet with Eisenhower until Summerfield was able to promise, on his word of honor, that Nixon would be confirmed as nominee at that meeting. "Dick is not going to be placed in the position of a little boy going somewhere to beg for forgiveness."

Just before the Nixon party left for the airport, Nixon friend and journalist Bert Andrews managed to reach him by phone. Andrews told Nixon that he should go to Wheeling; that public reaction had already foreordained the outcome. He advised Nixon that he should accede to Eisenhower's desire to make the inevitable decision in his own way, advice Nixon acknowledged "had the ring of truth". Nonetheless, the Nixon party flew to Missoula.

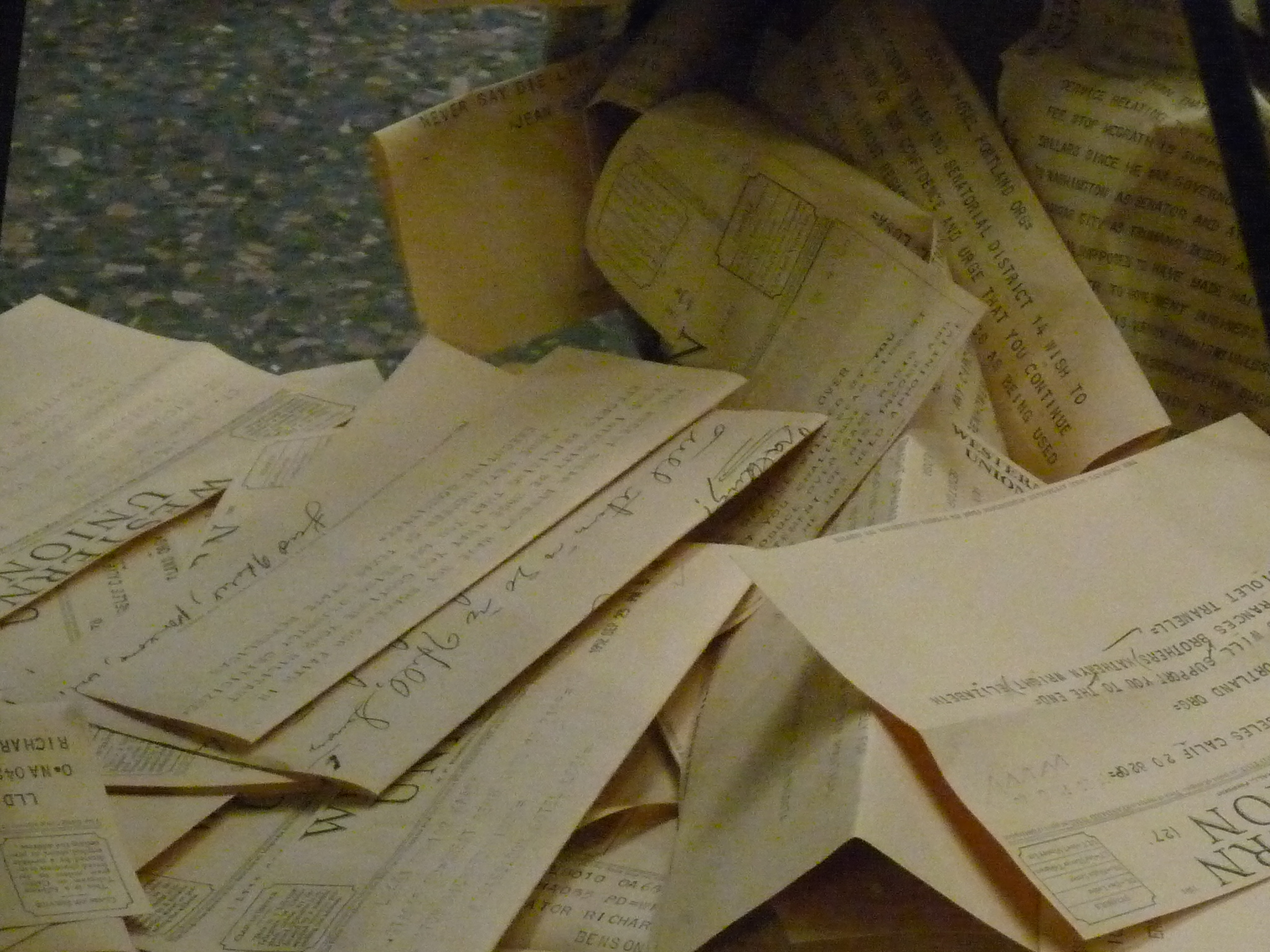
Supportive telegrams sent after the Checkers speech

By this time, the first wave of what would eventually be more than four million letters, telegrams, postcards, and phone calls had flooded into RNC headquarters and other political offices. While a later study found that only about 7 percent of these communications addressed any substantive issue, they still ran 75 to one in favor of Nixon. Nixon skeptics joined in; both Stassen and Dewey sent congratulatory telegrams. Many letters included contributions to help pay for the cost of the broadcast; the RNC eventually recouped four-fifths of the $75,000 cost. Newspaper switchboards were jammed with calls from people seeking the RNC's address, while Western Union was caught off guard by Nixon's request that listeners wire the RNC, and had no extra help on hand. Checkers herself received enough dog food to last a year, and hundreds of collars, leashes, and toys.

Politicians generally reacted along party lines, with Republican Senator Mundt of South Dakota stating, "Nixon's speech is complete vindication against one of the most vicious smears in American history." Democratic Senator Clinton Anderson of New Mexico stated, "I wish he had talked about the 18,000 bucks—not the puppy dog ... Suppose someone sets up a fund to buy my meals. I could say I didn't get one red cent of the money."

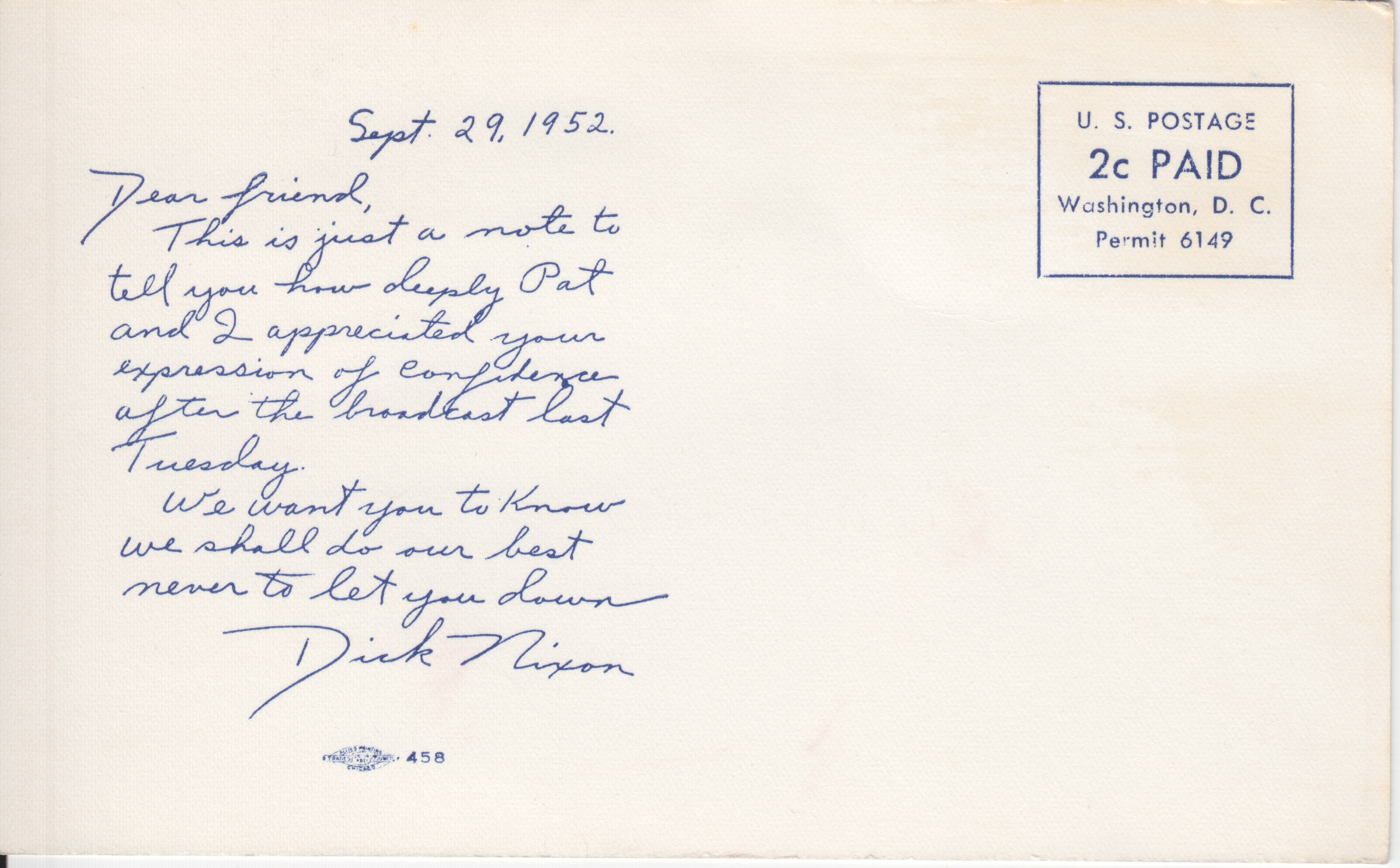
Preprinted postcard sent by Nixon to supporters who had written after the speech

On the morning of September 24, Summerfield and Humphreys called Nixon at his Missoula hotel. After securing his agreement to fly to Wheeling if Eisenhower agreed to Chotiner's terms, the two reached Eisenhower and campaign leader New Hampshire Governor Sherman Adams in Portsmouth, Ohio, en route to Wheeling, and briefed them on the conversation with Nixon and on the flood of communications from the public. Eisenhower and Adams agreed that Nixon could come to Wheeling with the assurance he would remain on the ticket. After making speeches in Missoula and at a stop in Denver, and after Eisenhower made his own speech announcing that his running mate had been the victim of an "attempted smear," Nixon arrived in Wheeling late in the day on the 24th. Eisenhower came to the airport to meet the plane, and hurried up the steps to greet the Nixons when the door was opened.

The candidates waved at the crowd of 3,000 which had come to meet the plane, and rode together, with Nixon in place of honor, to a rally at City Island Stadium as Eisenhower chatted to Nixon as if the crisis had never occurred. At the stadium, Eisenhower introduced Nixon as a "colleague" who had been subject to "a vicious and unprincipled attack" but who had "vindicated himself" and who "stood higher than ever before". Eisenhower finished by reading two telegrams, one from Nixon's mother assuring Eisenhower of her son's integrity, and the second from Summerfield stating that the RNC had voted unanimously to retain Nixon on the ticket. Nixon then spoke, telling the crowd that this was one of two moments when he was most proud to be an American; the other had been at the victory parade in New York in 1945, when he had seen General Eisenhower go by. He called the Wheeling rally "the greatest moment of my life".

=== Media reaction ===
Editorial reaction to the address was divided. The New York Times, which had criticized Nixon, and had even run stories with claims that he was under criminal investigation for the Fund, praised Nixon's "composure and assurance". The New York Journal-American gushed, "He was in our opinion, simply magnificent. We know of no other way to say it." The Pittsburgh Press called the address "an extraordinary speech". The Mobile Register stated that the Fund crisis "confronted [Nixon] with an unsought opportunity which he made the most of."

However, some newspapers disagreed. The Baltimore Sun noted that Nixon "did not deal in any way with the underlying question of propriety," while the St. Louis Post-Dispatch called the address "a carefully contrived soap opera". Columnist Walter Lippmann called the wave of support for Nixon "disturbing ... with all the magnification of modern electronics, simply mob law;" discussing the speech with a dinner guest, he said, "That must be the most demeaning experience my country has ever had to bear." Columnist Thomas Stokes criticized Eisenhower for equivocating on the question of his running mate until "the young man himself—the accused—had to step in and take over. And how he took over!" Through his presidency, Eisenhower would continue to be accused of being indecisive.

Nixon refused to answer further questions about the Fund, and attention turned to Stevenson's fund, especially as its details became clear. Governor Stevenson's fund, which proved to total $146,000, had been used for such expenditures as Christmas gifts to reporters, dues for private clubs, and to hire an orchestra for a dance his son was hosting. Taking a leaf from Nixon's book, the Democrats refused to answer questions about Stevenson's fund. Both parties were eager to bury the matter, and the story died.

== Legacy ==
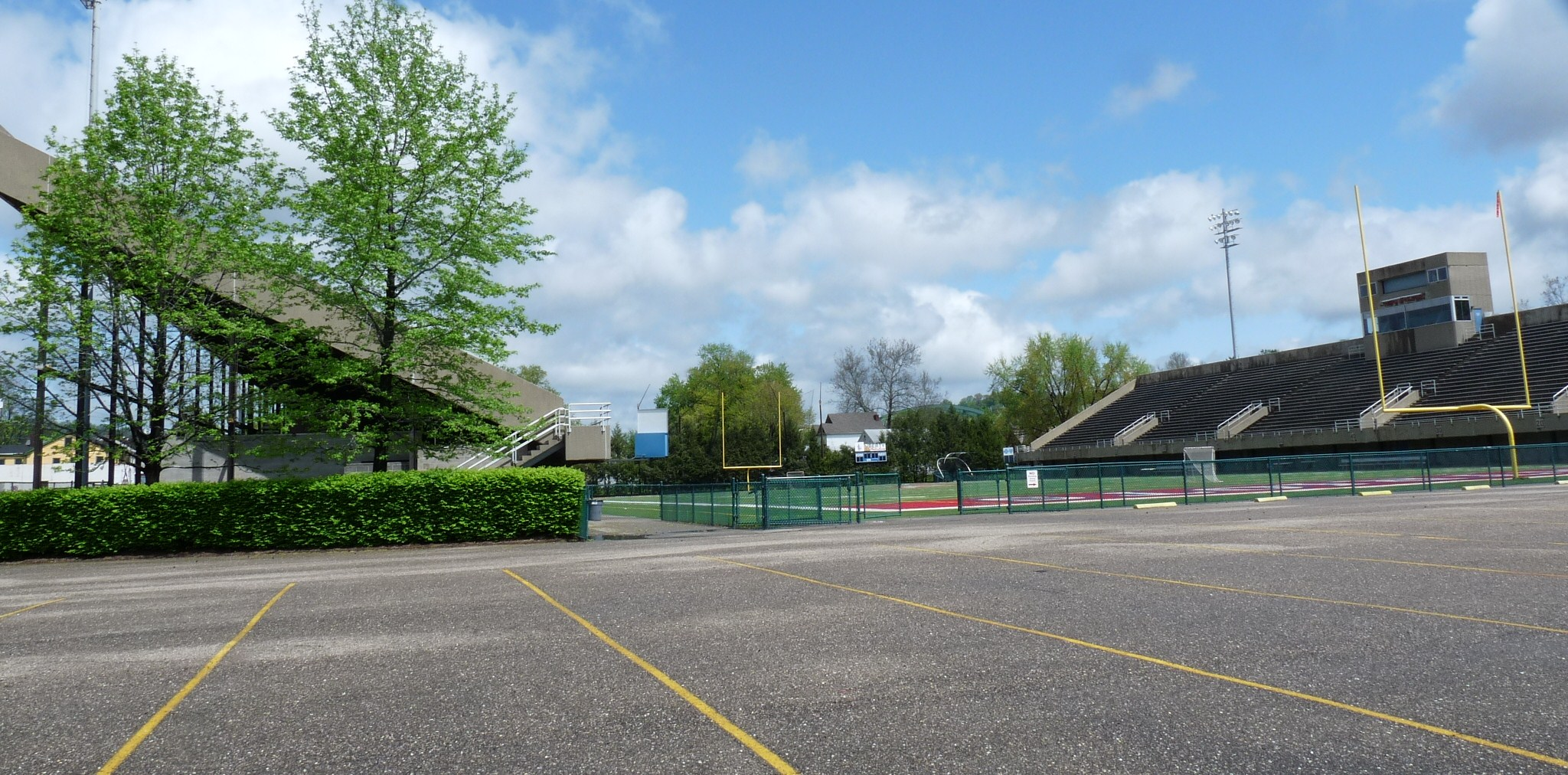
Wheeling Island Stadium (then City Island Stadium), site of the Republican rally on September 24, 1952

With The New York Times finding that Nixon's performance had given the Republican ticket "a shot in the arm", Eisenhower and Nixon swept to victory in November, with the Republicans narrowly taking both Houses of Congress. According to Nixon biographer Conrad Black, the speech earned Nixon supporters throughout Middle America which he would keep through the rest of his life, and who would continue to defend him after his death. Critics, however, would later see the address as the "ultimate expression" of the controversial politician's "phoniness". Nixon biographer Stephen Ambrose stated that part of the audience considered the address "one of the most sickening, disgusting, maudlin performances ever experienced". In their analysis of the speech published just before Nixon's election as president in 1968, Robert S. Cathcart and Edward A. Schwarz suggested that while Nixon "met the accusation head-on and accomplished his immediate goals successfully, he ultimately created an image which led to a decline in his political career."

The address was an unprecedented demonstration of the power of television to galvanize large segments of the American people to act in a political campaign. However, the onslaught of negative media attention leading up to the address "left its scars" on Nixon, and the future president never returned to the easy relationship with the press that he had enjoyed during his congressional career. His oft-stated view that the media was the enemy came to play a part in his downfall.

The Nixons' black-and-white Cocker Spaniel Checkers (1952–1964)

Nixon celebrated the anniversary of the speech each year. The future president disliked the fact that the address soon became popularly known as the "Checkers speech". In his 1962 book, Six Crises (the Fund crisis being one of the six), he would object to the term, "as though the mention of my dog was the only thing that saved my political career". Nixon preferred to call the address "the Fund speech," and made it required reading for his speechwriters. As time passed, the Checkers speech became denigrated, and Nixon biographer Earl Mazo suggested that much of the attitude of "I don't like Nixon, but I don't know why," which contributed to the failure of his 1960 presidential run, can be traced to the Checkers speech. Other commentators suggested that had he not made the Checkers speech, Nixon might have won in 1960. Nixon retorted that without the Checkers speech, he would not have been around to run in 1960.

Checkers died in 1964 and was buried in Wantagh, New York, at Long Island's Bide-A-Wee Pet Cemetery. In 1999, 137 scholars of American public address were asked to recommend speeches for inclusion on a list of "the 100 best American political speeches of the 20th century," based on "social and political impact, and rhetorical artistry". This speech placed 6th on the list.

Despite the many criticisms of the speech in later years, Hal Bochin (who wrote a book about Nixon's rhetoric) suggests that Nixon succeeded at the time because of his use of narrative, spinning a story which resonated with the public:

[The American people] could identify with the materials of the story—the low-cost apartment, the struggle with the mortgage payment, the parental loans, the lack of life insurance on the wife and children, and even the wife's cloth coat. By reputation, Nixon was a political fighter and also a family man, and the public admired the father who would not give back the family dog "regardless of what they said about it".

"Checkers speech" has since entered the English lexicon as an idiom meaning a personal, emotionally-charged speech given by a politician in order to win support from the public.

== See also ==
- 1952 United States presidential election
- Federal Election Campaign Act signed into law by Nixon in 1971
