= Helen Armstrong (violinist) =

American violinist (1943–2006)

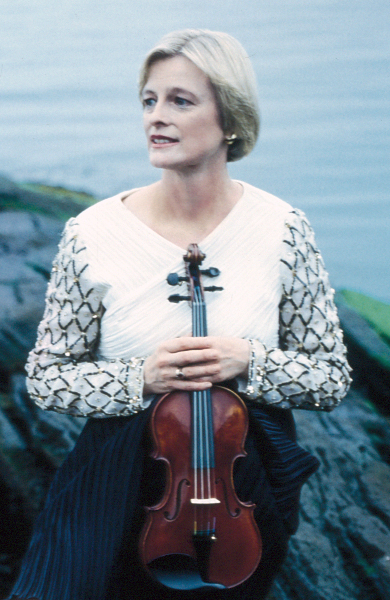
- Born: March 16, 1943; Rockford, Illinois, US
- Died: April 28, 2006 (aged 63); Greenwich, Connecticut, US
- Education: Juilliard School
- Occupation: Violinist
- Spouses: Alan Cohen (m. 1965; died 1978) Ajit Hutheesing (1996–2006)
- Children: Debbie Howser & David Cohen

Helen Armstrong (March 16, 1943 – April 28, 2006) was the founder and artistic director of Armstrong Chamber Concerts Inc (ACC), a non-profit, chamber music organization she founded in 1984. The creation and development of ACC was inspired by Avery Fisher and Skitch Henderson, who advised Ms. Armstrong that her new artistic mission should be to broaden public interest and knowledge of chamber music through performance and education. The heart of this mission has been to bring musical education to public and private schools through its unique Students’ Music Enrichment Program. More than 100,000 students have participated in this program in Litchfield and Fairfield counties, and in Harlem and the Bronx.

She developed ACC’s reputation by building a roster of more than 100 world-renowned-artists, many whom contributed to the education programs. Her dedication, artistry and love of music and musicians inspired all those who met her and performed with her, including Itzhak Perlman, Skitch Henderson, Martha Graham, Peter Duchin, Kathie Lee Gifford, Christopher Dodd, Ezra Laderman and June Dunbar.

== Early life ==
Armstrong was born in Rockford, Illinois, on March 16, 1943, to Dr. Robert Bruce and Hannah Armstrong. She first held a violin at the age of 3, with her mother as her teacher. She arrived in New York City, during which time she studied under Ivan Galamian and Dorothy DeLay. She eventually attended the Juilliard School in pursuit of a solo career.

She made her Lincoln Center debut in 1976 and went on to perform with orchestras such as the Boston Pops, the Indianapolis Symphony Orchestra, the New Polish Philharmonic, and the Martha Graham Dance Company.

== Career ==
Armstrong’s career as an international virtuoso violinist was interrupted by the long illness and eventual death of her first husband, Alan Cohen. Armstrong turned her talents largely towards achieving the mission of ACC while occasionally performing on the international stage. During the past 22 years, her focus had been concert performances in elegant private homes in Greenwich, in other venues in Washington, D.C., and New Milford, as well as at Carnegie Hall in New York City. In addition, she built a sterling reputation as a teacher by committing the talents of top artists to her educational mission.

Armstrong, who was a prizewinner in the Tibor Varga International Violin Competition in Switzerland and has received awards from the Society of American Musicians and Outstanding Artists of Illinois, is listed in Who's Who in the East, Who's Who in American Women, Outstanding Young Women of America and Who’s Who in Entertainment. She has recorded on the Musical Heritage, Elysium and CRS labels — Reflections, on the Elysium label and the newest CD, Illusions, on CRS, which was recently released. Her violin, a J.B. Guadagnini, dated 1760, was one of her great loves.

Late in her life, Bruce Swedien, convinced her to join him in producing a popular music recording. Although they were able to produce early cuts of the recording, she died before it could be completed.

Helen died on April 28, 2006, in Greenwich, Connecticut, at the age of 63

== Personal life ==
Armstrong was widowed by her first husband, Alan Cohen in 1978. They had two children together: daughter Debbie Howser and son David Cohen. She married investment banker Ajit Hutheesing, the nephew of Jawaharlal Nehru, India's first Prime Minister, in 1996. Hutheesing was a member of the Nehru-Gandhi political family and died on 8 December 2017.

== Photos ==
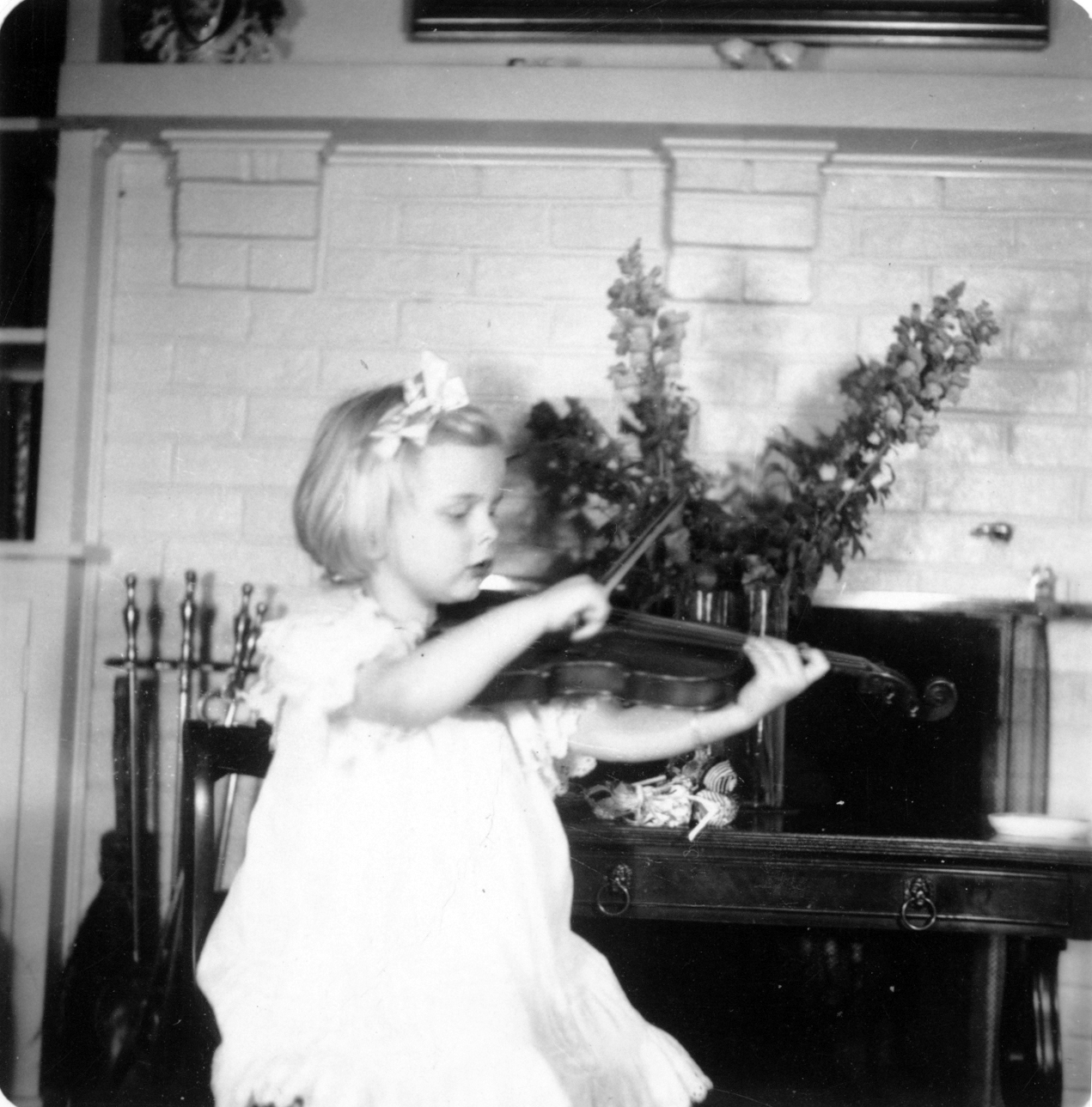
Helen Armstrong at age 3

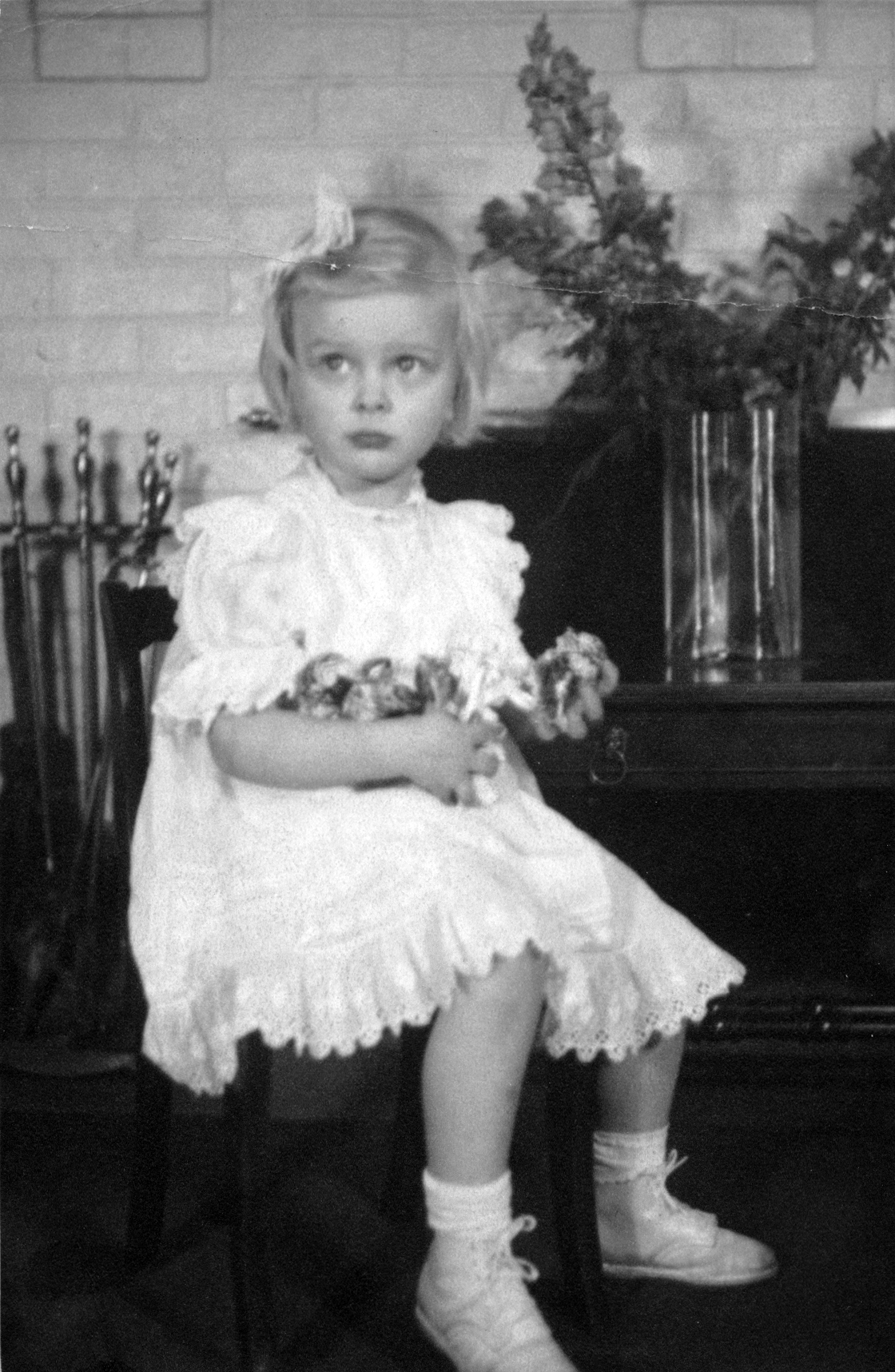
Helen Armstrong

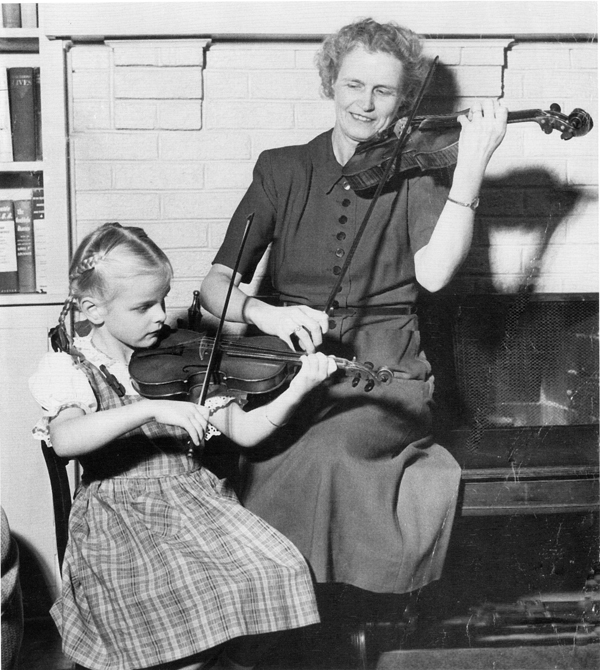
Helen Armstrong and her mother Hannah

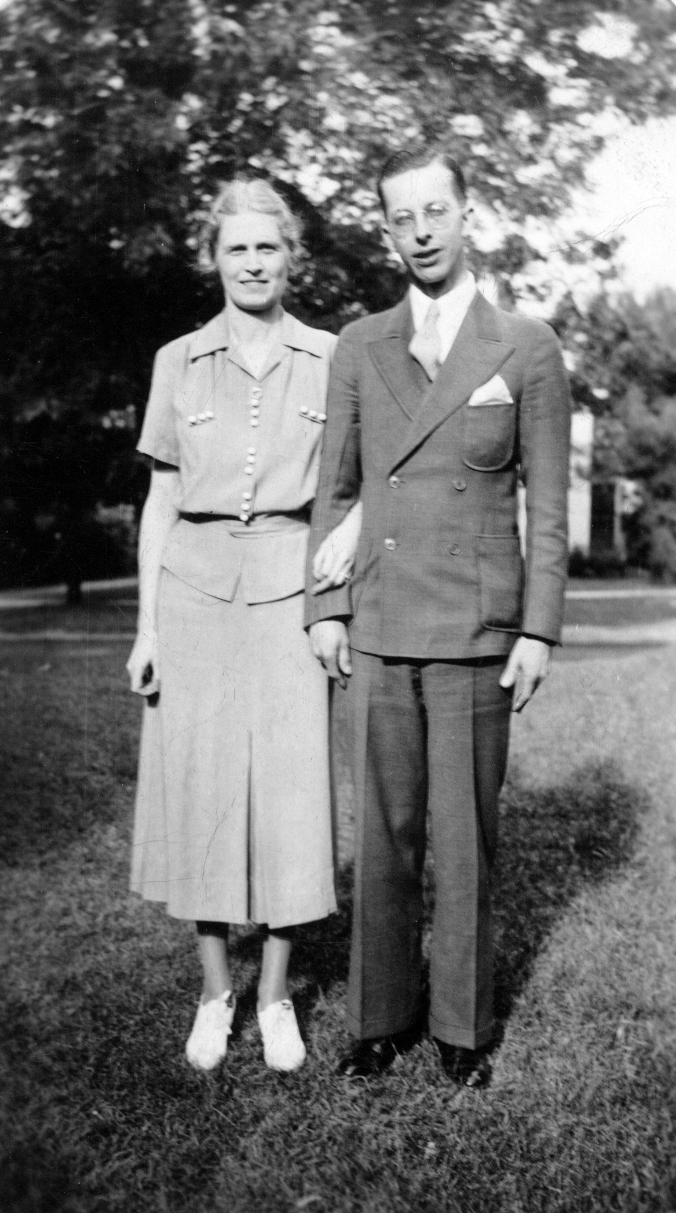
Parents: Hannah and Robert Bruce Armstrong

Helen Armstrong early years

Helen Armstrong 1960's Publicity Photo

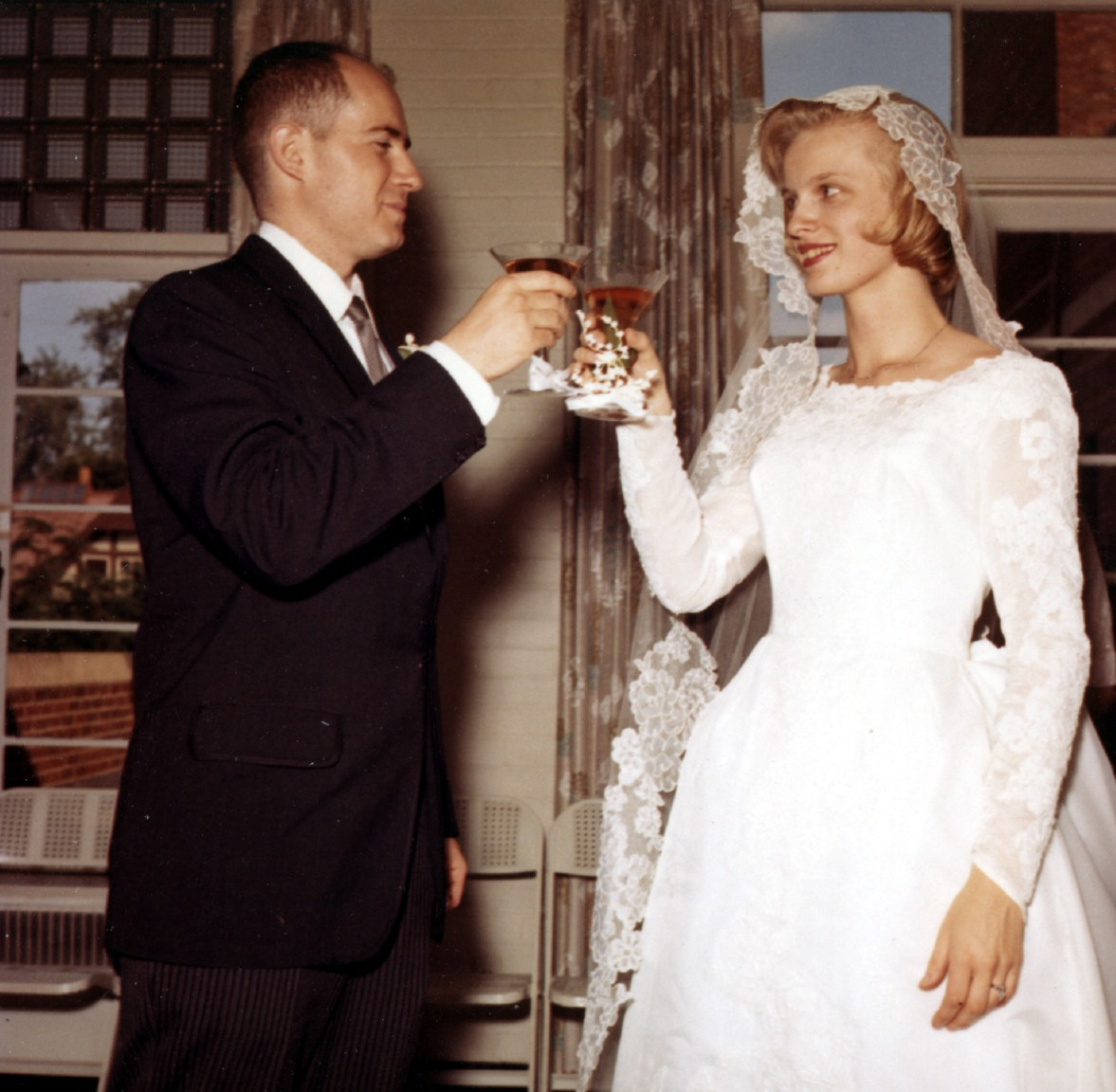
Helen & Alan Cohen (1965)

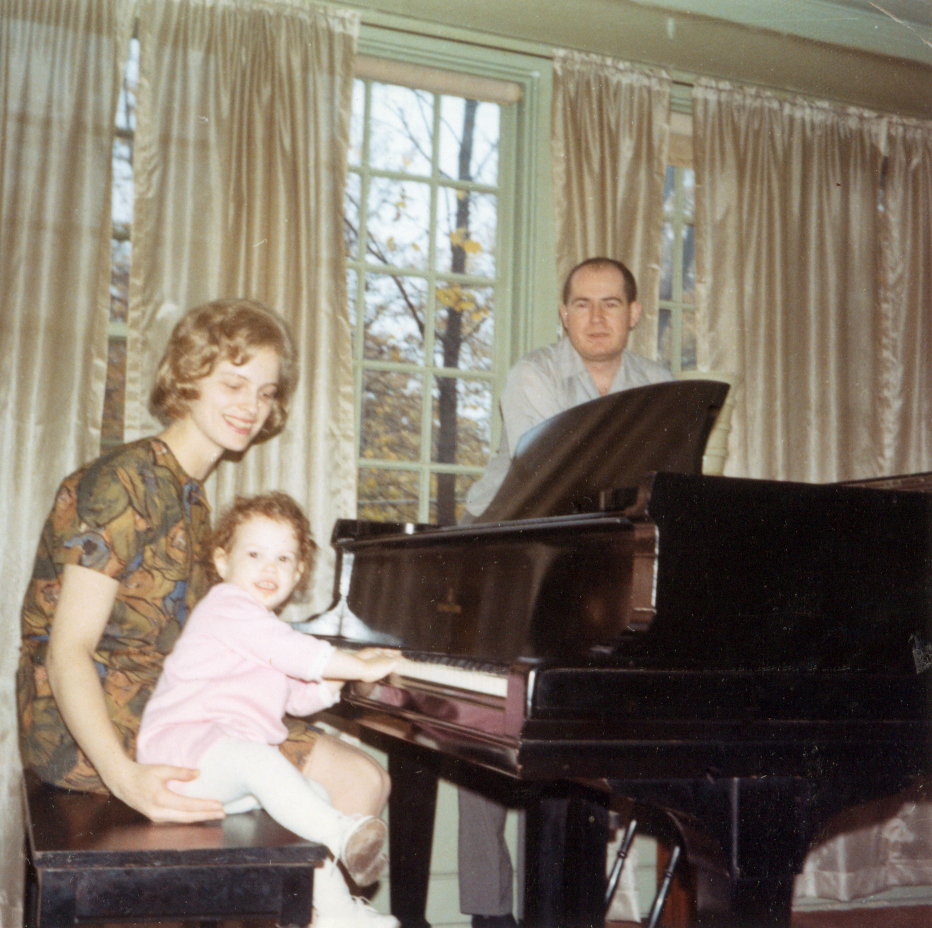
Helen Armstrong with husband Alan Cohen and daughter Debbie Howser (1967)

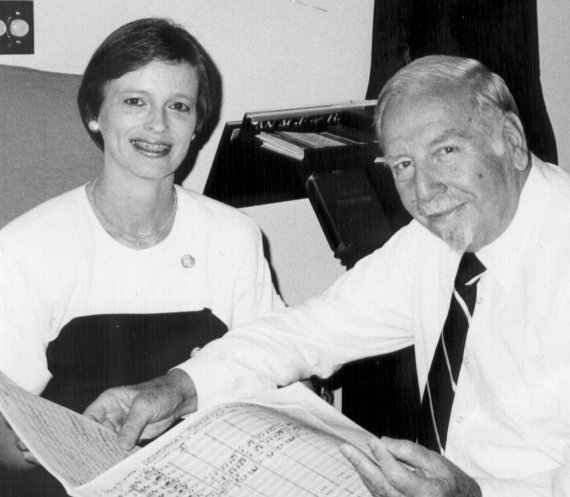
Helen Armstrong and Skitch Henderson

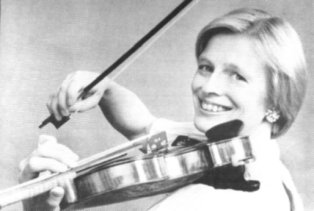
Helen Armstrong

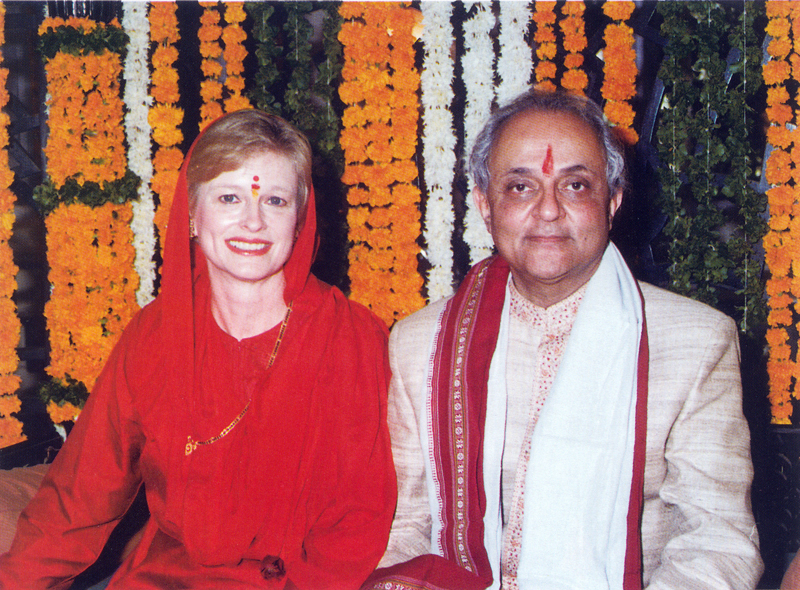
Helen & Ajit's Wedding in India (1996)

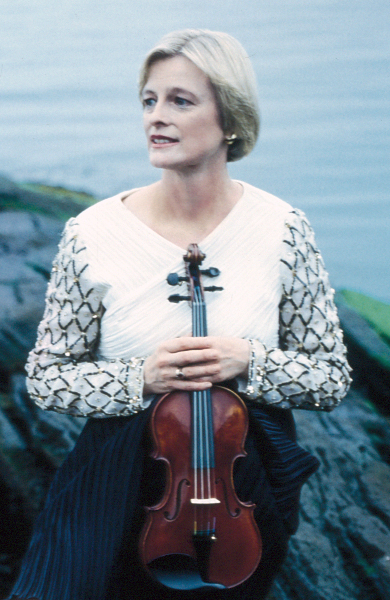
Helen Armstrong

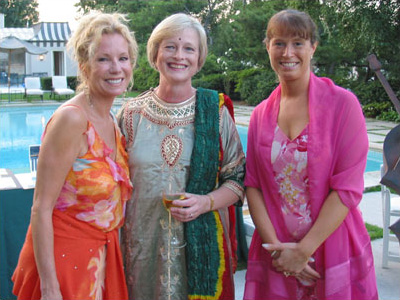
Kathie Lee Gifford - Helen Armstrong - Debbie Howser

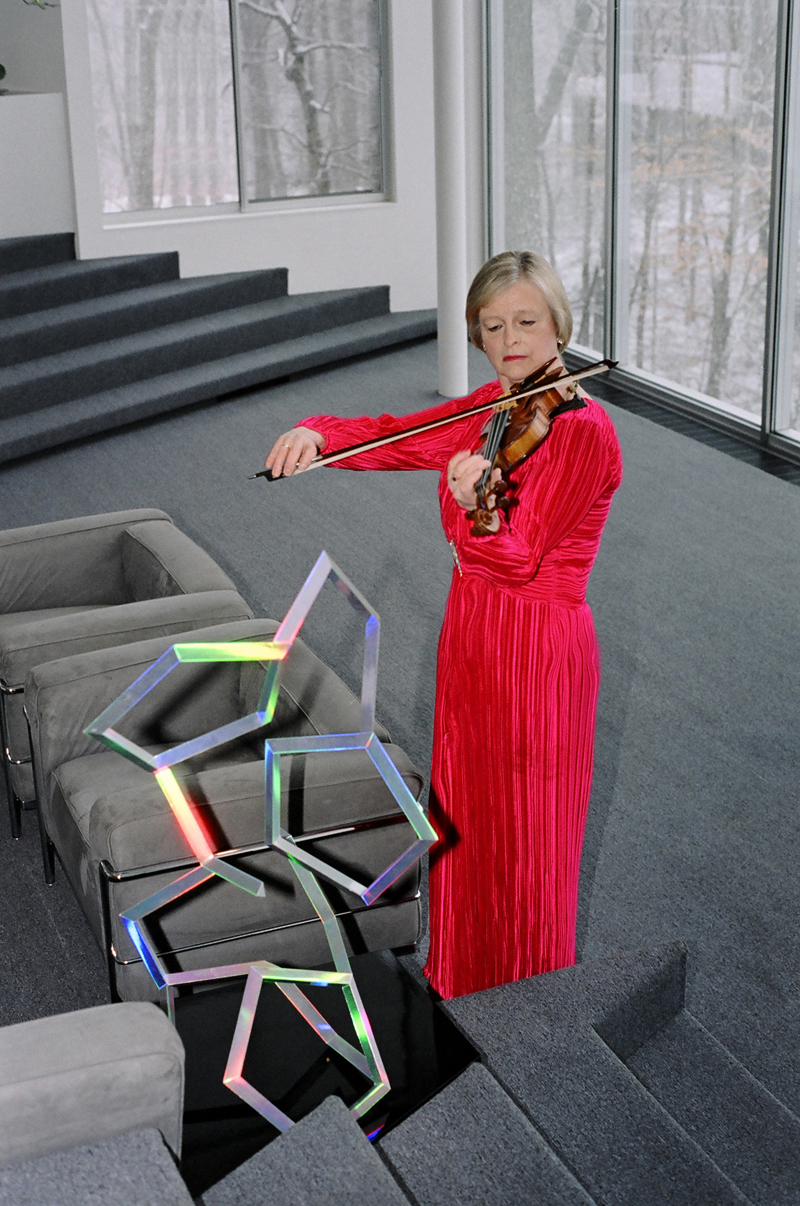
Helen Armstrong performing in 2006
