= Deaths in September 2006 =

The following is a list of notable deaths in September 2006.

Entries for each day are listed alphabetically by surname. A typical entry lists information in the following sequence:

- Name, age, country of citizenship at birth, subsequent country of citizenship (if applicable), reason for notability, cause of death (if known), and reference.

== September 2006 ==
=== 1 ===
- Tommy Chesbro, 66, American wrestler and coach (Oklahoma State University), heart attack.
- Severino Compagnoni, 92, Italian cross-country skier and Olympian (1948, 1952).
- Nellie Connally, 87, American political figure, First Lady of Texas (1963–1969), shared car at John F. Kennedy assassination.
- Ted Davidson, 66, American baseball player (Cincinnati Reds, Atlanta Braves).
- Anil Kumar Dutta, 73, Indian artist, founder of Academy of Creative Art.
- György Faludy, 95, Hungarian poet, writer and translator.
- Buford Long, 74, American football player (Florida Gators, New York Giants).
- Rashid Maidin, 89, Malaysian leader of the Communist Party.
- Ronald Mansbridge, 100, British-born American publisher, founded first US branch of Cambridge University Press.
- Richard Frewen Martin, 88, British fighter pilot and test pilot.
- Warren Mitofsky, 72, American pollster, creator of the exit poll, heart failure.
- Bob O'Connor, 61, American Mayor of Pittsburgh, Pennsylvania, brain cancer.
- Travis Payze, 60, Australian footballer, prostate cancer.
- Sir Kyffin Williams, 88, Welsh artist, lung and prostate cancer.
- Pierre Monichon, 80, French musicologist and inventor of the Harmoneon.

=== 2 ===
- Victor Bernal, 52, American baseball player (San Diego Padres).
- Eduard Butenko, 65, Russian actor, theatre director.
- Jerry Dahlke, 77, American baseball player (Chicago White Sox).
- Bob Mathias, 75, American decathlete, twice Olympic gold medalist (1948, 1952), United States Representative (1967-1975), cancer.
- Deforrest Most, 89, American gymnast, helped establish Muscle Beach, heart failure.
- Willi Ninja, 45, American dancer and choreographer, AIDS.
- Otakar Nožíř, 89, Czech footballer.
- Clermont Pépin, 80, Canadian composer, liver cancer.
- Silverio Pérez, 91, Mexican bullfighter, renal illness.
- Lionel Pickering, 74, British businessman, chairman of Derby County, cancer.
- Anthony Poon, 61, Singaporean abstract artist, lung cancer.
- Endel Ratas, 67, Estonian activist and politician.
- Dewey Redman, 75, American jazz saxophonist, father of Joshua Redman, liver failure.
- Andy Tonkovich, 83, American basketball player (Marshall Thundering Herd, Providence Steamrollers).
- Charlie Williams, 77, British comedian and footballer (Doncaster Rovers), Parkinson's disease.
- Sahibzada Muhammad Ishaq Zaffar, 61, Pakistani politician, heart attack.

=== 3 ===
- Françoise Claustre, 69, French ethnologist and archaeologist.
- Wim van Duyl, 86, Dutch Olympic sailor (1948, 1952, 1960, 1964).
- Levi Fox, 92, British conservationist and historian, Director of the Shakespeare Birthplace Trust.
- Ian Hamer, 73, British jazz trumpeter.
- Eva Knardahl, 79, Norwegian classical pianist.
- Sandro Rasini, 87, Italian Olympic bobsledder (1952).
- Monty Stickles, 68, American football player (San Francisco 49ers, New Orleans Saints), heart failure.
- Annemarie Wendl, 91, German actress, heart failure.

=== 4 ===
- Rémy Belvaux, 39, Belgian writer, film producer and director (Man Bites Dog), suicide.
- Ingrid Bjoner, 78, Norwegian soprano.
- John Conte, 90, American actor, founded TV station KMIR, natural causes.
- Giacinto Facchetti, 64, Italian footballer, cancer.
- James Fee, 56, American photographer, liver cancer.
- Mark Anthony Graham, 33, Canadian Olympic athlete (1992), and soldier, friendly fire.
- Steve Irwin, 44, Australian naturalist (The Crocodile Hunter), stabbed in the chest by a stingray barb.
- Mark Jackson, 37, Canadian Olympic athlete (1992).
- Khadaffy Janjalani, 31, Filipino militant, leader of Abu Sayyaf, shot.
- Moses Khumalo, 26, South African jazz saxophonist, suicide by hanging.
- Clive Lythgoe, 79, British pianist.
- Mlondi Mdluli, 21, Swazi footballer.
- Satyendra Narayan Sinha, 89, Indian politician.
- Colin Thiele, 85, Australian children's author, heart failure.
- Astrid Varnay, 88, American soprano.

=== 5 ===
- Sir Michael Davies, 85, British jurist.
- Gamal El-Nazer, 76, Egyptian Olympic water polo player (1960).
- Anne Gregg, 66, British television presenter (Holiday), cancer.
- Endre Kiss, 59, Hungarian Olympic judoka (1976, 1980).
- Gösta Löfgren, 83, Swedish football player and Olympian (1952).
- Ignacio Macaya, 72, Spanish Olympic field hockey player (1960, 1964).
- Hilary Mason, 89, British character actress.
- John McLusky, 83, British comics artist (James Bond).
- J. Bazzel Mull, 91, American Christianity preacher and gospel music promoter.

=== 6 ===
- Warren Bolster, 59, American surf and skateboard photographer, suicide by gunshot.
- Sir John Drummond, 71, British controller of BBC Radio 3 and The Proms.
- Lovette George, 44, American Broadway theatre singer and actress, ovarian cancer.
- Peter Greenough, 89, American finance columnist (The Boston Globe), husband of Beverly Sills, after long illness.
- Peter Hyndman, 64, Canadian politician and lawyer, cancer.
- Gordon Manning, 89, American television journalist (NBC and CBS), heart attack.
- Sir Michael Marshall, 76, British politician, MP for Arundel (1974–1997), President of the Chichester Festival Theatre.
- Mohammed Taha Mohammed Ahmed, c.50, Sudanese newspaper editor, beheaded.
- Agha Shahi, 86, Pakistani diplomat and foreign minister, heart attack.
- Mark Wright, 27, British soldier, posthumously awarded George Cross.

=== 7 ===
- Efraim Allsalu, 77, Estonian painter.
- Sir Norman Blacklock, 78, British physician, Medical Officer to the Queen (1976–1993).
- Clem Coetzee, 67, Zimbabwean conservationist, heart attack.
- Les Colvin, 87, Canadian ice hockey player (Boston Bruins).
- Michael S. Davison, 89, American army general, congestive heart failure.
- James DeAnda, 81, American lawyer and federal judge, part of the legal team in Hernandez v. Texas, prostate cancer.
- Jorge di Giandoménico, 75, Argentine Olympic sports shooter (1960, 1972, 1976).
- Joan Donaldson, 60, American founding head of the CBC Newsworld television network, complications from injuries.
- Sir Stephen Egerton, 74, British diplomat, Ambassador to Italy (1989–1992).
- James Hawthorne, 74, British controller of the BBC in Northern Ireland (1979–1989).
- Ozell Jones, 45, American basketball player (San Antonio Spurs, Los Angeles Clippers).
- Robert Earl Jones, 96, American actor (Lying Lips, The Sting, One Potato, Two Potato).
- Ronald St. John Macdonald, 78, Canadian legal academic and jurist.
- Gordie Mueller, 83, American baseball player (Boston Red Sox).
- Cornelius O'Leary, 78, Irish historian.
- John M. Watson Sr., 69, American jazz musician and actor, non-Hodgkin lymphoma.

=== 8 ===
- Hilda Bernstein, 91, British-born South African author and anti-apartheid activist, heart failure.
- Peter Brock, 61, Australian touring car racer, car accident.
- William Harper, 90, Rhodesian politician
- Thomas Lee Judge, 71, American Governor of Montana (1973–1981), pulmonary fibrosis.
- Frank Middlemass, 87, British actor (Heartbeat, As Time Goes By, Barry Lyndon).
- Patricia Rideout-Rosenberg, 75, Canadian contralto and music educator.
- Erk Russell, 80, American college football coach (University of Georgia, Georgia Southern University), stroke.
- Fred Spiess, 86, American oceanographer and marine explorer, cancer.

=== 9 ===
- Héctor Blondet, 59, Puerto Rican basketball player and Olympian (1972, 1976).
- Gérard Brach, 79, French screenwriter (The Fearless Vampire Killers, The Name of the Rose), cancer.
- Clair Burgener, 84, American Representative for California (1973–1983), complications from Alzheimer's disease.
- Sergio Dellachá, 80, Argentine Olympic equestrian (1952).
- Matt Gadsby, 27, British footballer (Hinckley United), arrhythmogenic cardiomyopathy.
- Émilie Mondor, 25, Canadian Olympic distance runner (2004), car accident.
- Elisabeth Ogilvie, 89, American author.
- Herbert Rudley, 95, American actor.
- Keshavram Kashiram Shastri, 101, Indian founder of VHP, natural causes.
- William Bernard Ziff Jr., 76, American publishing magnate, prostate cancer.

=== 10 ===
- Ernestine Bayer, 97, American rower, complications from pneumonia.
- Patty Berg, 88, American golf pioneer, founder of the LPGA, complications from Alzheimer's disease.
- Al Gardella, 88, American baseball player (New York Giants).
- James C. Hickman, 79, American actuary and academic administrator, Dean of University of Wisconsin–Madison School of Business (1985–1990).
- Arne Hoel, 79, Norwegian ski jumper and Olympian (1952, 1956).
- Sir John Johnston, 84, British courtier, Comptroller of the Lord Chamberlain's Office (1981–1987).
- Ramanlal Joshi, 80, Indian literary critic and editor.
- Melanie Lomax, 56, American civil rights lawyer, former president of the Los Angeles Board of Police Commissioners, car accident.
- Ted Risenhoover, 71, American Representative for Oklahoma (1975–1979).
- Bennie Smith, 72, American blues guitarist, heart attack.
- Daniel Wayne Smith, 20, American actor, son of Anna Nicole Smith, drug overdose.
- Tāufaʻāhau Tupou IV, 88, Tongan royal, King of Tonga, after illness.
- Gabor Varga, 45, Swedish aviator, plane crash.

=== 11 ===
- William Auld, 81, British poet, author and supporter of Esperanto.
- Francis J. Boyle, 79, American district judge (United States District Court for the District of Rhode Island).
- Peter Clentzos, 97, American-born Greek Olympic pole vaulter (1932).
- Pat Corley, 76, American actor (Murphy Brown, Against All Odds, Hill Street Blues), heart failure.
- János Dévai, 66, Hungarian Olympic cyclist (1960).
- Solange Fernex, 72, French ecologist and green politician.
- Joachim Fest, 79, German historian and journalist.
- Joseph Hayes, 88, American author (The Desperate Hours).
- Lennart Nelson, 88, Swedish Olympic weightlifter (1948).
- Johannes Bob van Benthem, 85, Dutch lawyer, first president of the European Patent Office (1977–1985).

=== 12 ===
- Glenda Dawson, 65, American politician.
- Jock Duncan, 85, British diplomat.
- Dick Guesman, 68, American football player (West Virginia Mountaineers, New York Titans/Jets, Denver Broncos).
- Kathlyn Kelley, 87, American Olympic high jumper (1936).
- Raymond Mikesell, 93, American economist at the Bretton Woods Conference.
- Milorad Nikolić, 86, Serbian footballer.
- Emily Perez, 23, American first female African-American Army officer to die in combat, improvised explosive device.
- Craig Roberts, 38, Canadian Olympic wrestler (1996).
- Bill Saul, 65, American football player (Pittsburgh Steelers), cancer.
- Edna Staebler, 100, Canadian cookbook and non-fiction author, stroke.

=== 13 ===
- Brian Biggins, 66, English football player (Chester City).
- Cesare Barbetti, 75, Italian actor and voice actor.
- Walter Crosby, 85, American baseball player.
- Sir Douglas Dodds-Parker, 97, British Conservative minister and wartime SOE officer.
- Christopher Essex, 61, Australian fashion designer, cancer.
- N. V. Krishnaiah, 76, Indian politician.
- Shokichi Natsui, 80, Japanese judoka.
- Sándor Ormándi, 84, Hungarian Olympic rower (1948).
- Ann Richards, 73, American Governor of Texas (1991–1995), esophageal cancer.
- Peter Tevis, 69, American musician, Parkinson's Disease.

=== 14 ===
- Norman Brooks, 78, Canadian singer, Al Jolson imitator, emphysema.
- Silviu Brucan, 90, Romanian ambassador to the United States, opponent of Nicolae Ceauşescu.
- Elizabeth Choy, 95, Singaporean war heroine, first female legislator, pancreatic cancer.
- Myron Fass, 80, American publisher.
- Mickey Hargitay, 80, Hungarian-American actor (Will Success Spoil Rock Hunter?, The Loves of Hercules, Promises! Promises!) and bodybuilder.
- J. William Kime, 72, American former commandant of the Coast Guard.
- Andrey Kozlov, 41, Russian First Deputy Chairman of the Central Bank of Russia, shot.
- Peter Ling, 80, British television writer, creator of Crossroads.
- Paulo Marques, 58, Brazilian journalist and presenter, brain cancer.
- Esme Melville, 87, Australian film and television actress.
- Terry O'Sullivan, 91, American actor (Search for Tomorrow, Days of Our Lives), pancreatic cancer.
- Johnny Palmer, 88, American golfer, seven-time PGA Tour winner.
- Jacques Rambaud, 100, French Olympic sailor (1936).
- Frederic Wakeman, 68, American scholar of Chinese history.

=== 15 ===
- Raymond Baxter, 84, British television presenter (Tomorrow's World).
- Brunon Bendig, 67, Polish boxer and Olympian (1960, 1964).
- Oriana Fallaci, 77, Italian journalist and writer, breast cancer.
- Harry Forssell, 98, Brazilian Olympic swimmer (1932).
- Guy François, Haitian Army colonel, participated in failed coups in 1989 and 2001.
- Charles L. Grant, 64, American horror and science fiction author, heart attack.
- Douglas Henderson, 71, British politician.
- Donald Kimball, 62, American defrocked Roman Catholic priest, convicted in sex abuse scandal.
- Nitun Kundu, 70, Bangladeshi artist and sculptor.
- David T. Lykken, 78, American professor of psychology (University of Minnesota).
- Abe Saffron, 86, Australian nightclub owner and property developer.
- Pablo Santos, 19, Mexican actor (Greetings from Tucson), plane crash.
- Sergio Savarese, 48, Italian furniture designer, plane crash.
- Meredith Thring, 90, British engineer.

=== 16 ===
- John Allen, 80, American Olympic athlete (1960).
- Sten Andersson, 83, Swedish Minister for Foreign Affairs (1985–1991) and Minister for Social Affairs (1982–1985), heart attack.
- Barton Bradley, 76, Canadian ice hockey player (Boston Bruins).
- Bill Bredde, 73, American football player (Chicago Cardinals).
- Floyd Curry, 81, Canadian four-time Stanley Cup winner (Montreal Canadiens).
- George Estman, 84, South African Olympic cyclist (1948, 1952).
- E. H. H. Green, 47, British historian, multiple sclerosis.
- Bill Knibbs, 64, Canadian ice hockey player (Boston Bruins).
- Zsuzsa Körmöczy, 82, Hungarian tennis player and coach, won 1958 French Championships.
- Esther Martinez, 94, American Tewa storyteller and linguist, car accident.
- Fouad el-Mohandes, 82, Egyptian comedy actor, heart failure.
- Paul Hitch Roney, 85, American circuit judge.
- Henri Thellin, 75, Belgian footballer.

=== 17 ===
- Jack Banta, 81, American baseball player (Brooklyn Dodgers).
- Hans Berglund, 88, Swedish canoeist and Olympian (1948).
- Al Casey, 89, American rock and country music guitarist.
- Seán Clancy, 105, Irish oldest War of Independence veteran.
- George Heslop, 66, English footballer (Manchester City).
- Patricia Kennedy Lawford, 82, American socialite, sister of John F. Kennedy, ex-wife of actor Peter Lawford, pneumonia.
- Nathaniel Lubell, 90, American Olympic fencer (1948, 1952, 1956), and artist.
- Edward D. Re, 85, American lawyer and judge.
- Leonella Sgorbati, 65, Italian nun, shot.
- Kazuyuki Sogabe, 58, Japanese voice actor (Sailor Moon, Dragon Ball, Metal Gear Solid), esophageal cancer.
- Dorothy C. Stratton, 107, American first director of the Coast Guard Women's Reserve.
- Ed Ulinski, 86, American football player (Cleveland Browns).

=== 18 ===
- Edward J. King, 81, American Governor of Massachusetts (1979–1983).
- Philip H. Melanson, 61, American academic, expert on assassinations, cancer.
- Nilton Pereira Mendes, 30, Brazilian footballer, heart attack.
- M. Ct. Muthiah, 76, Indian industrialist and banker, chairman of the Indian Overseas Bank (1954–1969).
- Leo Navratil, 85, Austrian psychiatrist.
- Syd Thrift, 77, American general manager of the Pittsburgh Pirates and Baltimore Orioles.

=== 19 ===
- Elizabeth Allen, 77, American actress (Donovan's Reef, Do I Hear a Waltz?, The Jackie Gleason Show).
- Danny Flores, 77, American saxophonist and vocalist (The Champs), pneumonia.
- Joe Glazer, 88, American singer-songwriter.
- Martha Holmes, 83, American Life photographer, natural causes.
- Sir Hugh Kāwharu, 79, New Zealand academic and Māori leader.
- Vico Magistretti, 86, Italian architect and designer.
- Manuel Mindán Manero, 103, Spanish philosopher and priest, natural causes.
- Buddy Peterson, 81, American baseball player (Chicago White Sox, Baltimore Orioles).
- Marv Schatzman, 79, American basketball player (Saint Louis Billikens, St. Louis Bombers).
- Roy Schuiten, 55, Dutch track and road racing cyclist and Olympian (1972).
- Terry Smith, 47, Australian rules football player (Richmond, St Kilda), cancer.

=== 20 ===
- Phạm Xuân Ẩn, 78, Vietnamese journalist, North Vietnamese spy during Vietnam War, emphysema.
- Clarence Hill, 48, American convicted murderer, executed by lethal injection.
- Henri Jayer, 84, French winemaker.
- Armin Jordan, 74, Swiss conductor.
- Beth Levine, 91, American shoe designer.
- Sven Nykvist, 83, Swedish cinematographer (Cries and Whispers, Fanny and Alexander, The Unbearable Lightness of Being), Oscar winner (1974, 1984).
- John W. Peterson, 84, American gospel hymn writer, cancer.
- Lillian Robinson, 65, American professor of women's studies (Concordia University).
- Ernie Schroeder, 90, American comic book artist.
- Don Walser, 72, American country singer and yodeler, complications from diabetes.
- Muddy Waters, 83, American college football coach (Michigan State University).
- Dean Wooldridge, 93, American physicist, co-founder of TRW.

=== 21 ===
- Boz Burrell, 60, British bassist and vocalist (Bad Company, King Crimson), heart attack.
- Margaret Ekpo, 92, Nigerian politician and women's rights activist.
- Alan Fletcher, 75, British graphic designer.
- Gilbert Jonas, 76, American fundraiser for the NAACP.
- Charles Larson, 86, American television writer and Emmy Award-nominated producer (The F.B.I.).
- Charles Rees, 78, British chemist.
- Marcelo Trabucco, 72, Argentine Olympic swimmer (1952).

=== 22 ===
- Edward Albert, 55, American actor (Butterflies Are Free, Port Charles, Power Rangers Time Force), lung cancer.
- Gordon George Avery, 81, Australian triple jumper and Olympian (1948).
- Carla Benschop, 56, Dutch basketball player.
- Tommy Garnett, 91, English-born Australian cricketer and educator.
- Enrique Gorriarán Merlo, 64, Argentine revolutionary and guerrilla leader, cardiac arrest due to abdominal aortic aneurysm.
- Walt Nielsen, 89, American football player (Arizona Wildcats, New York Giants).
- John Noppenberg, 89, American football player (Miami Hurricanes, Pittsburgh Pirates/Steelers, Detroit Lions).
- Tommy Olivencia, 64, Puerto Rican salsa singer and bandleader.
- Mary Orr, 95, American author.
- Vic Sears, 88, American football player (Oregon State Beavers, Philadelphia Eagles).

=== 23 ===
- Sir Malcolm Arnold, 84, British film score composer (The Bridge on the River Kwai), Oscar winner (1958), chest infection.
- Etta Baker, 93, American piedmont blues guitarist.
- Sir Charles Cutler, 88, Australian Deputy Premier of New South Wales (1965–1975), cancer.
- Eric Ferguson, 75, Canadian politician, member of the House of Commons of Canada (1979-1980).
- Takao Kajimoto, 71, Japanese baseball player.
- Aladár Pege, 67, Hungarian jazz musician.
- Patrick Tull, 65, British television actor (Mosquito Squadron)
- Tim Rooney, 59, American actor, son of Mickey Rooney, dermatomyositis.
- Notable victims of the 2006 Shree Air Mil Mi-8 crash:
  - Harka Gurung, 67, Nepalese geographer, author and politician
  - Chandra Gurung, Nepalese environmentalist
  - Gopal Rai, 49, Nepalese politician
  - Mingma Norbu Sherpa, 50, Nepalese conservationist

=== 24 ===
- John S. Boskovich, 49, American artist and screenwriter.
- Joel Broyhill, 86, American Republican congressman for Virginia (1953–1975), heart failure and pneumonia.
- I. B. Donalson, 91, American air force officer and flying ace, pneumonia.
- Michael Ferguson, 53, Irish republican politician, testicular cancer.
- Sally Gray, 90, British actress.
- Joan Hatcher, 82, New Zealand cricketer.
- Ben Heppner, 63, Canadian politician, bone cancer.
- Kirsten Hedegaard Jensen, 71, Danish Olympic swimmer (1952).
- John Niklasson, 83, Swedish Olympic rower (1952).
- Padmini, 74, Indian actress in Tamil, Malayalam, Hindi, Telugu and Kannada films, heart attack.
- Patrick Quinn, 56, American actor, president of Actors' Equity Association (2000–2006), heart attack.
- Gene Rutherford, 67, American actor.
- Per Stavem, 80, Norwegian Olympic athlete (1948, 1952).
- Thomas Stewart, 78, American bass-baritone opera singer.
- Tetsurō Tamba, 84, Japanese actor (You Only Live Twice, The Battle of Port Arthur, The Cat Returns).
- Henry Townsend, 96, American blues guitarist, pianist and songwriter, pulmonary edema.

=== 25 ===
- Safia Amajan, 65, Afghan women's rights advocate, shot.
- Omar al-Faruq, 35, Kuwaiti senior member of al-Qaeda, shot.
- Jeff Cooper, 86, American small arms expert.
- Maureen Daly, 85, American author (Seventeenth Summer).
- John M. Ford, 49, American science fiction and fantasy writer, natural causes.
- Viktor Jansson, 86, Finnish Olympic equestrian (1952).
- Sir Vijay Singh, 75, Indo-Fijian lawyer and politician, cancer.
- Sir Iain Tennant, 87, Scottish businessman and public servant.
- Vitaly Ustinov, 96, Russian First Hierarch of the Russian Orthodox Church Outside Russia (1985–2001).

=== 26 ===
- Gerhard Behrendt, 77, German inventor of Sandmännchen children's television character.
- Giuseppe Bennati, 85, Italian film director.
- L. Jonathan Cohen, 83, British philosopher.
- Iva Toguri D'Aquino, 90, Japanese American convicted and later pardoned of being World War II propagandist "Tokyo Rose".
- Mihály Fülöp, 70, Hungarian Olympic fencer (1956, 1960).
- Byron Nelson, 94, American professional golfer.
- Sir Philip Randle, 80, British biochemist.
- Clarence Robison, 83, American athlete, coach, and Olympian (1948).
- Sir Martin Roth, 88, Hungarian-born British president of the Royal College of Psychiatrists.
- John Salisse, 80, British businessman and magician.
- Ralph Story, 86, American radio broadcaster and television host (The $64,000 Challenge), emphysema.
- Allan Thomson, 63, Australian rugby league player and coach (Manly Warringah Sea Eagles, Halifax Panthers).

=== 27 ===
- Guan Xuezeng, 84, Chinese actor.
- Geraldine Guest, 83, American baseball player (Peoria Redwings).
- Tommy Harris, 79, Welsh rugby union and rugby league player (Hull F.C., national team).
- William Horwitz, 88, American chemist.
- Helmut Kallmeyer, 95, German chemist and Aktion T4 perpetrator.
- Joe Koppe, 75, American baseball player (Milwaukee Braves, Philadelphia Phillies, Los Angeles/California Angels).
- Craig Kusick, 57, American baseball player (Minnesota Twins, Toronto Blue Jays), leukemia.
- Arthur Marwick, 70, British historian, first professor of history at the Open University.
- Sofia Muratova, 77, Soviet Russian gymnast and Olympian (1956, 1960).
- Sir Michael Pollock, 89, British admiral, First Sea Lord (1971–1974).

=== 28 ===
- Arnaldo Balay, 78, Argentine footballer.
- George Balzer, 91, American writer for Jack Benny's radio and TV shows.
- Adam Curle, 90, British academic and peace activist.
- James Hamilton, 4th Baron Hamilton of Dalzell, 68, British aristocrat and politician, cancer.
- Virgil Ierunca, 86, Romanian writer.
- Thor Moxnes, 82, Norwegian footballer.

=== 29 ===
- Mariano Antonelli, 73, Italian Olympic sports shooter (1960).
- Rosamond Carr, 94, American fashion illustrator turned humanitarian and activist.
- Jan Werner Danielsen, 30, Norwegian singer, heart failure.
- Gerry Gazzard, 81, English footballer.
- Walter Hadlee, 91, New Zealand cricketer, stroke.
- Howard Hartley, 82, American football player (Duke Blue Devils, Washington Redskins, Pittsburgh Steelers).
- Billy Mauch, 85, American child actor and sound editor.
- Michael A. Monsoor, 25, United States Navy SEAL.
- Louis-Albert Vachon, 94, Canadian Archbishop Emeritus of Québec.

=== 30 ===
- Isabel Bigley, 80, American actress (Guys and Dolls), Tony winner (1951).
- Silvio Giolito, 88, American Olympic fencer (1948, 1952).
- Josh Graves, 79, American bluegrass dobro player.
- Bert James, 92, Australian politician, MP for Hunter (1960–1980).
- Adolf H. Lundin, 73, Swedish oil and mining entrepreneur, leukemia.
- Pino Mlakar, 99, Slovenian ballet dancer.
- André Schwarz-Bart, 78, French novelist.
- András Sütő, 79, Romanian writer of Hungarian descent, melanoma.
- Jun Tatara, 89, Japanese actor.
