= Shree Airlines =

Nepalese airline

Shree Airlines श्री एयरलाइन्स

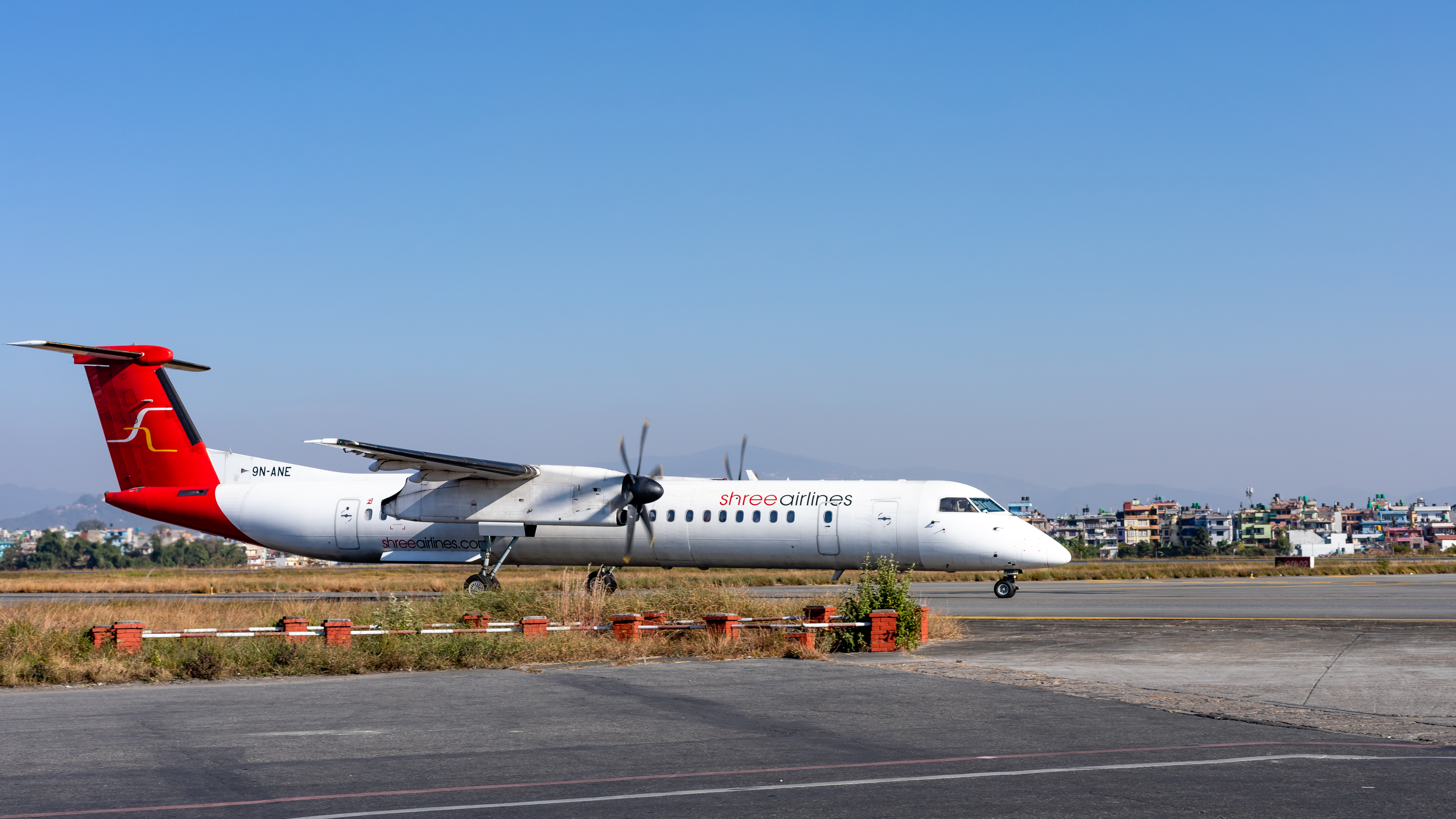
- Shree Airlines De Havilland Canada Dash 8-400
IATA	ICAO	Call sign
N9	SHA	SHREEAIR
- Founded: 1999; 27 years ago
- AOC #: 030/2002
- Hubs: Tribhuvan International Airport
- Frequent-flyer program: High Flyer Club
- Fleet size: 9
- Destinations: 7
- Headquarters: Sinamangal, Kathmandu, Nepal
- Key people: Sudhir Mittal (chairman)
- Website: www.shreeairlines.com

Shree Airlines Pvt. Ltd. (Nepali: श्री एयरलाइन्स) is an airline based in Kathmandu, Nepal. It operates domestic services within Nepal, including chartered helicopter flights. The airline also provides charter flights and air ambulance services to international destinations. As of 2024, Shree Airlines is the third-largest domestic carrier in Nepal by passengers carried and the second-largest by fleet size. All air carriers certified by the authorities responsible for regulatory oversight of Nepal, including Shree Airlines, are banned from operating in the European Union.

== History ==
Shree Airlines CRJ at Tribhuvan International Airport (2015)

The airline was founded by Banwari Lal Mittal in the 1990s and was originally incorporated as Air Ananya, named after the founder's granddaughter, Ananya Mittal.

Previously known as Shree Air, it became the largest operator of helicopters in Nepal with a fleet of Mi-17 helicopters. In 2016, the airline diversified into fixed-wing operations by acquiring three jets, with plans to operate scheduled domestic flights from Tribhuvan International Airport. As part of its NPR 2 billion expansion project, these services were launched under the brand name Shree Airlines

During the COVID-19 pandemic in Nepal, Shree Airlines operated charter flights to Singapore, marking the airline's debut in international services.

== Services ==
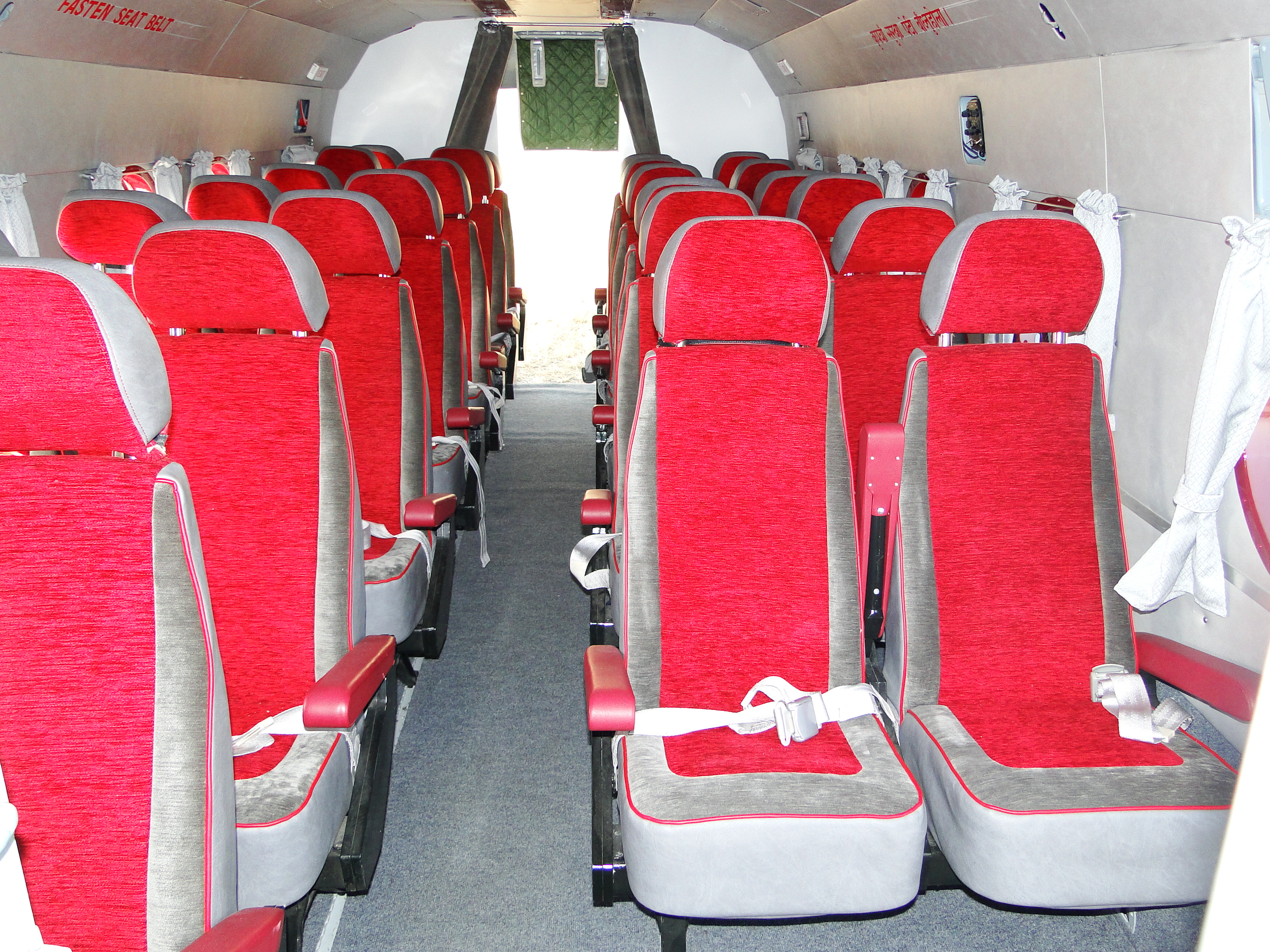
Mil Mi-8 passenger cabin

=== Humanitarian and UN peacekeeping flights ===
Shree Airlines has operated helicopter flights for the World Food Programme and the Nepal Food Corporation. These flights delivered food to remote and hard-to-reach areas of Nepal. The airline has delivered more than 8,000,000 kilograms of food to the Nepalese population.

It also operated long-term charter flights for the United Nations in support of peacekeeping operations in Uganda from 2008 to 2014. The contract was cancelled after the International Civil Aviation Organization (ICAO) attached a "significant safety concern" label to all Nepalese airlines. Following the cancellation, four Mi-17 helicopters were left in Uganda, as the airline did not find it viable to return them to Nepal. As of September 2016, two helicopters remain in Africa, while the other two are undergoing overhaul.

=== Religious tourism ===
Shree Airlines operates helicopter flights to Hilsa in north-west Nepal, located near the northern border, which serves as the starting point for the Mansarovar and Mount Kailash pilgrimage. The airline also provides charter flights to Muktinath, a popular pilgrimage destination in central Nepal.

== Destinations ==
As of June 2024, Shree Airlines operates scheduled domestic flights to the following destinations:

Destination	Airport	IATA	ICAO	Notes
Kathmandu	Tribhuvan International Airport	KTM	VNKT	Hub
Bhairahawa	Gautam Buddha International Airport	BWA	VNBW	
Biratnagar	Biratnagar Airport	BIR	VNVT	
Dhangadhi	Dhangadhi Airport	DHI	VNDH	
Nepalgunj	Nepalgunj Airport	KEP	VNNG	
Pokhara	Pokhara International Airport	PHH	VNPR	
Birendranagar	Surkhet Airport	SKH	VNSK	
Bharatpur	Bharatpur Airport	BHR	VNBP	

== Fleet ==
As of August 2025, Shree Airlines operates the following aircraft:

Fixed wing aircraft
Aircraft model	In fleet	Orders	Passengers			Notes
Aircraft model	In fleet	Orders	C	Y	Total	Notes
Bombardier CRJ200ER	2	—	—	50	50	
Bombardier Dash 8 Q400	7	—	12	68	80	
Total	9	—				

Helicopters
Helicopter model	In fleet	Orders	Passengers			Notes
Helicopter model	In fleet	Orders	C	Y	Total	Notes
Mil Mi-17	6	—	—	24	24	Four positioned in Uganda after serving in a UN mission.
Eurocopter AS350 B3e	2	—	—	5	5	
Total	8	—				

== Accidents and incidents ==
- On 23 September 2006, a Shree Airlines Mil Mi-8 helicopter, operating on a chartered mission to Kathmandu, crashed shortly after departing from Ghunsa, Taplejung. All four crew members and 20 passengers were killed in the crash. The victims included several senior officials of the World Wide Fund for Nature, Nepalese Government officials Gopal Rai and Harka Gurung, and conservationist Chandra Gurung.
- On 2 February 2018, a Shree Airlines Bombardier CRJ200ER was involved in a minor incident at Gautam Buddha Airport, Bhairahawa. The aircraft's wing tip was damaged after it came into contact with the wing of a Yeti Airlines Jetstream 41 at the airport's parking bay.
- On 5 October 2021, a Shree Airlines Bombardier Dash 8, preparing for departure to Nepalgunj, skidded off the taxiway in the parking area at Kathmandu. According to Kathmandu Airport authorities, no injuries occurred and the aircraft sustained no damage. The flight departed for Nepalgunj a few hours later.
- On 10 March 2023, the Civil Aviation Authority of Nepal temporarily grounded the entire fleet of Shree Airlines. The decision came a day after an engine fire occurred mid-flight on one of the airline's Bombardier Dash 8 Q400 aircraft, forcing it to return to Kathmandu.

== Sponsorships ==
Shree Airlines is an active sponsor of sports and events. It co-sponsored the 2018 Dhangadhi Premier League and has been sponsoring the Biratnagar Kings cricket team since 2019. The airline also sponsored the 2019 SAFF Women's Championship in football.
