= Bubenko =

Bubenko is a surname. Notable people with the surname include:

- Adalberts Bubenko (1910–1983), Latvian athlete
- Janis Bubenko (1935–2022), Latvian born Swedish computer scientist
- Jozef Bubenko (born 1951), Slovak football coach

== See also ==
- Babenko
- Butenko
