= Micro hydropower in Nepal =

Micro hydropower to generate electricity in Nepal started with Pharping plant with an installed capacity of 500 kW in 1911 followed by Sundarijal and Panauti, in 1936 and 1965 respectively. Up to 1980, the focus was laid primarily on large-scale power generation through large hydro and thermal means, the micro-hydro potential remained untapped. In the first four years (1981–1985), the government started subsidising the micro-hydro plants. The number of plants has been increasing thereafter. Most of these plants are off-grid isolated plants serving for local villages. In 2000, Alternative Energy Promotion Centre was formed to look after the micro-hydropower in Nepal. It defined the plants in the range of 10-100 kW as micro hydropower. As of 2018, about 3000 microhydro projects have been installed contributing about 35 MW.

== History ==
Micro hydro plants were installed in Nepal since the 1960s with locally developed turbines to replace diesel engines mainly for agro-processing. First installation of micro hydro power was done ad Godavari in 1962. Agriculture Development Bank of Nepal started to provide loan facility to village entrepreneurs to set paddy mill, oil expeller or grinder. By the 1980s, a number of turbine mills were fitted with small dynamo to generate electricity to power few nearby houses.

In the 90s, Nepal government started providing a subsidy of NPR 70,000 per kw for scheme above 3 kW and NPR 55,000 for peltric set up to 3 kW. A transport subsidy of NPR 21000 per kw is also provided depending on the location of the plant. The maximum subsidy is set at NPR 150,000 per kw. The subsidy is reimbursed by the Alternative Energy Promotion Center. The construction cost is around $2860 per kW of electricity. Besides Alternative Energy Promotion Center, various institutes are involved in the development of micro-hydro. Major ones are:

- Alternative Energy Promotion Center: the apex body of the government to promote and formulate policies related to micro hydro. Any subsidy should be applied via this body.
- Energy Sector Assistance Programme: a partnership between the Alternative Energy Promotion Center and the Government of Denmark via DANIDA.
- Rural Energy Development Programme: a UNDP supported program started since 1996. It works in various districts though the District Energy Offices. About 1100 kW has been installed via 80 micro-hydro plants by the 2000s.
- Annapurna Conservation Area Project: supports micro hydro mainly inside the Annapurna Conservation Area to displace fuelwood by electric cooking. About 460 kW has been installed via 11 projects by this project.
- Remote Area Development Committee: a government body which has installed about 300 kW via 22 micro-hydro plants in various districts.

== Technology ==
The micro hydropower plants are mostly primitive types using locally manufactured turbines.

=== Turbines ===
The mostly used turbines are Pelton and Cross-flow types. Most of the MHP turbines are manufactured locally.

The first turbine manufactured at the Balaju Yantra Shala Pvt. Ltd. (established 1960) was a 5 kW propeller turbine for the first MHP of Nepal in 1962. Kathmandu Metal Industries Pvt. Ltd., Nepal YantraShala Energy, Nepal Hydro & Electric Pvt. Ltd., Nepal Machine and Steel Structure, and Thapa Engineering Industries Pvt. Ltd. followed in the manufacturing of turbines in Nepal. They even started manufacturing and providing installation and maintenance services to foreign clients.

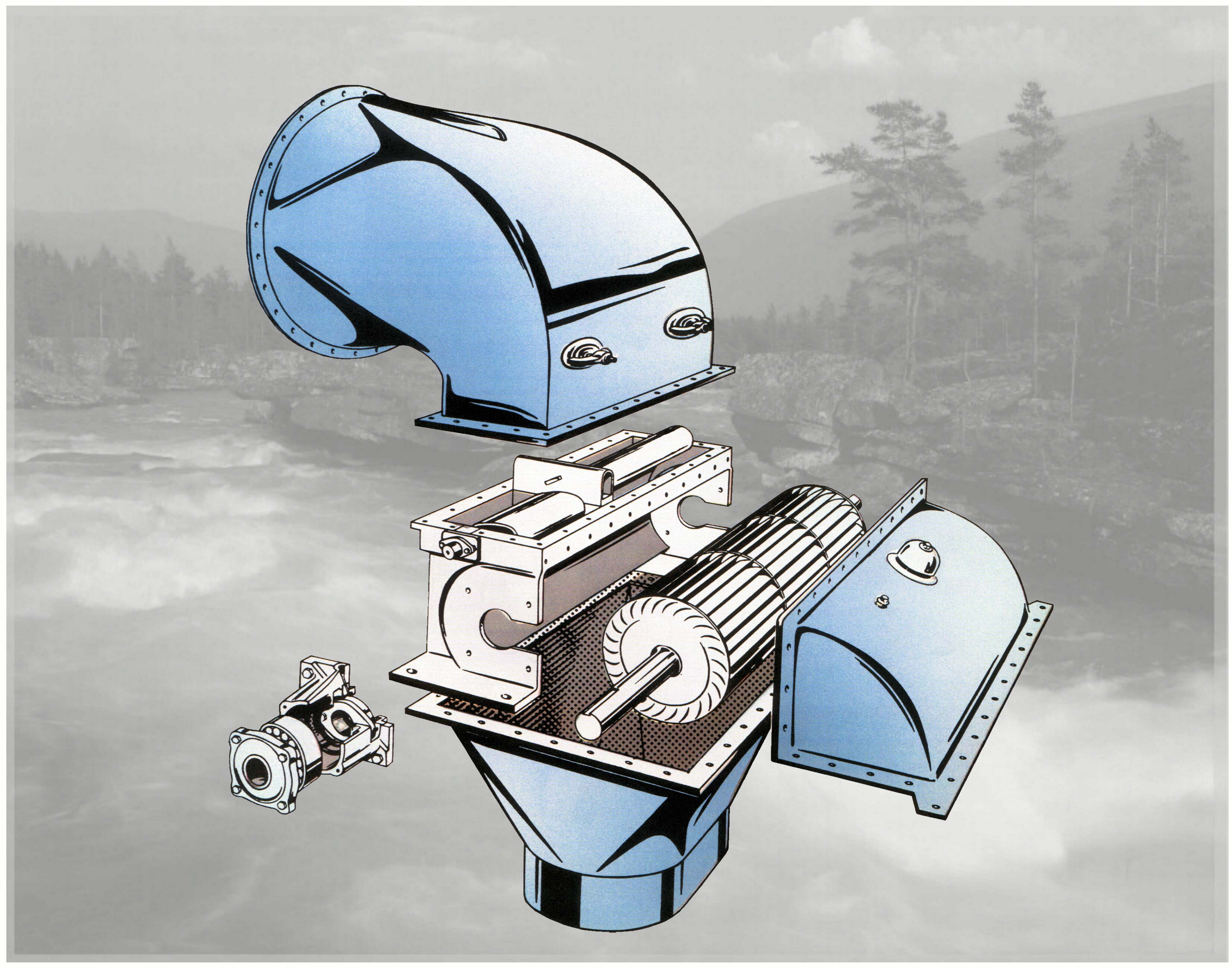
Cross Flow Turbine

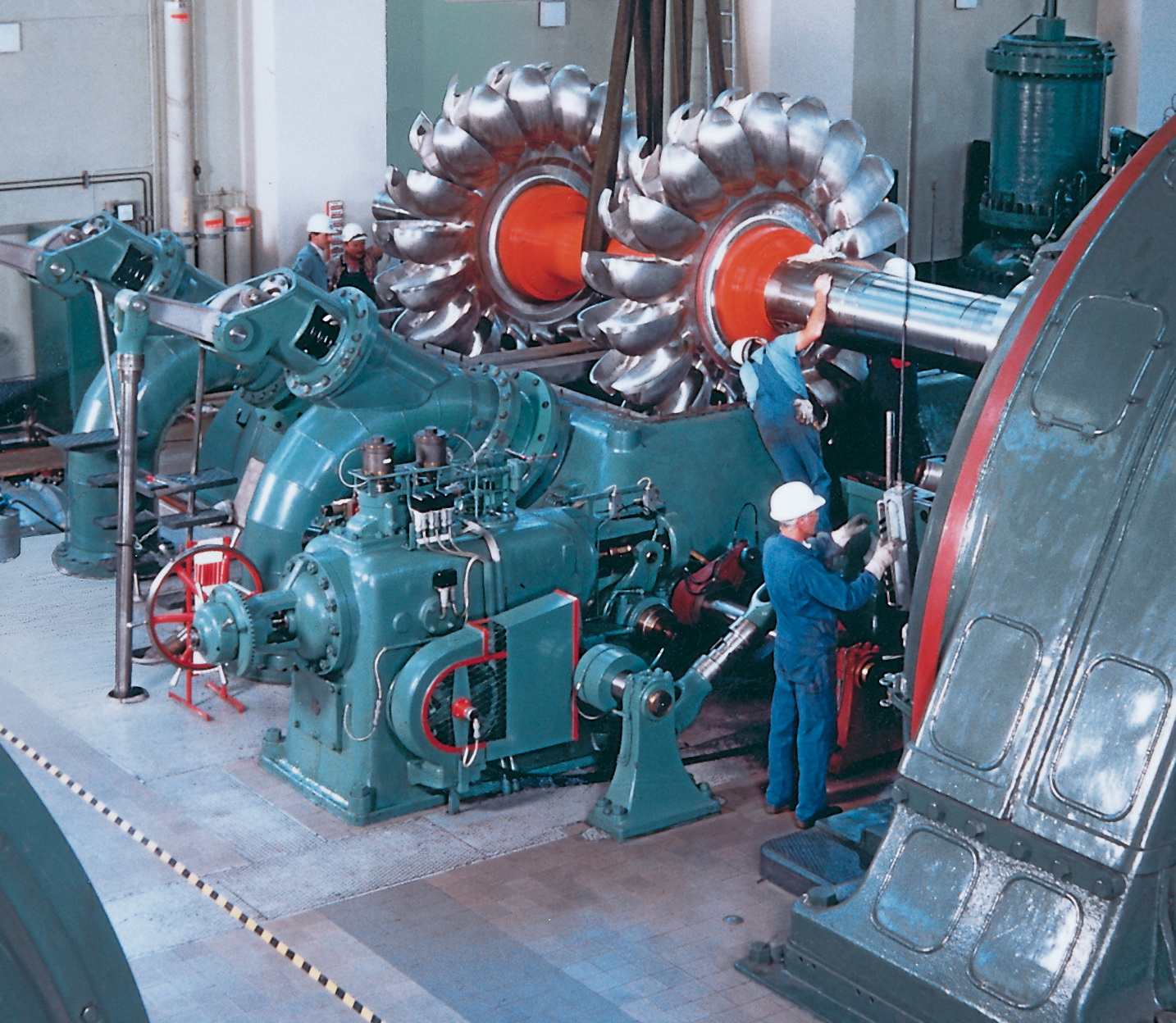
Pelton Turbine

=== Grid Connection ===
Micro hydro projects are mostly run in isolation. In 2015, the Nepal Electricity Authority and the Alternative Energy Promotion Center agreed to grid interconnection. The authority was initially reluctant for connection concerned with the technical robustness and safety of such an arrangement. but gradually started to connect micro-hydro to its grid. Syaurebhumi MHP (23 kW) was the first project to interconnect with the national grid on 11 January 2018 delivering 178,245 units of electricity annually. This MHP is located in the Sikre village of Nuwakot district. Leguwa Khola MHP (40 kW capacity) in Dhankutta district and Chimal MHP (capacity 90 kW) in Taplejung district were also connected to the grid.

=== Research and Development ===
Various research and development works are also being carried out. The development of cross-flow turbines, Peltric Set are some examples. To popularize electrical cooking, about 500 numbers of low wattage cooker (300/400w) also known as Bijuli Dekchi were manufactured in Nepal, but due to low demand, its production has ceased. Nepal Hydro and Electric in Butwal also developed a 200 W propeller turbine. It also developed Pico Power Pack, a single shaft pelton wheel to run a grinder in collaboration with Nottingham Trent University, UK. It was successfully tested in Nepal.

== Performance ==
Design are done with flat efficiency of 50% without considering the type of turbine. The measured efficiency of the turbine are between 45% and 80%.

== Guidelines and manual ==
A list of manual for identification, design and operation of micro-hydro in Nepal are listed below:

- Subsidy Policy in English
- Civil Works Guidelines for Micro Hydropower in Nepal (English)
- Construction and Installation Guidelines in Nepali

== List of notable micro hydropower projects ==
Name	Location	Capacity (kW)	Turbine Type	Description	Reference
Ghunsa Micro Hydro Plant	Ghunsa	35	Pelton	A helicopter accident killed three conservationists in this area.	wiki
Godavari Micro Hydro	Kathmandu	5		First Micro Hydro Power plant established in 1962.	
Syaurebhumi Micro Hydro	Nuwakot district	23		First Micro Hydro Power plant to be connected to the national grid (11 January 2018).	
Khorunga Rivulet Micro Hydroelectric Project	Terathum district	130		Constructed during Panchyat era	

== Gallery ==
An example of micro hydro project in Nepal.

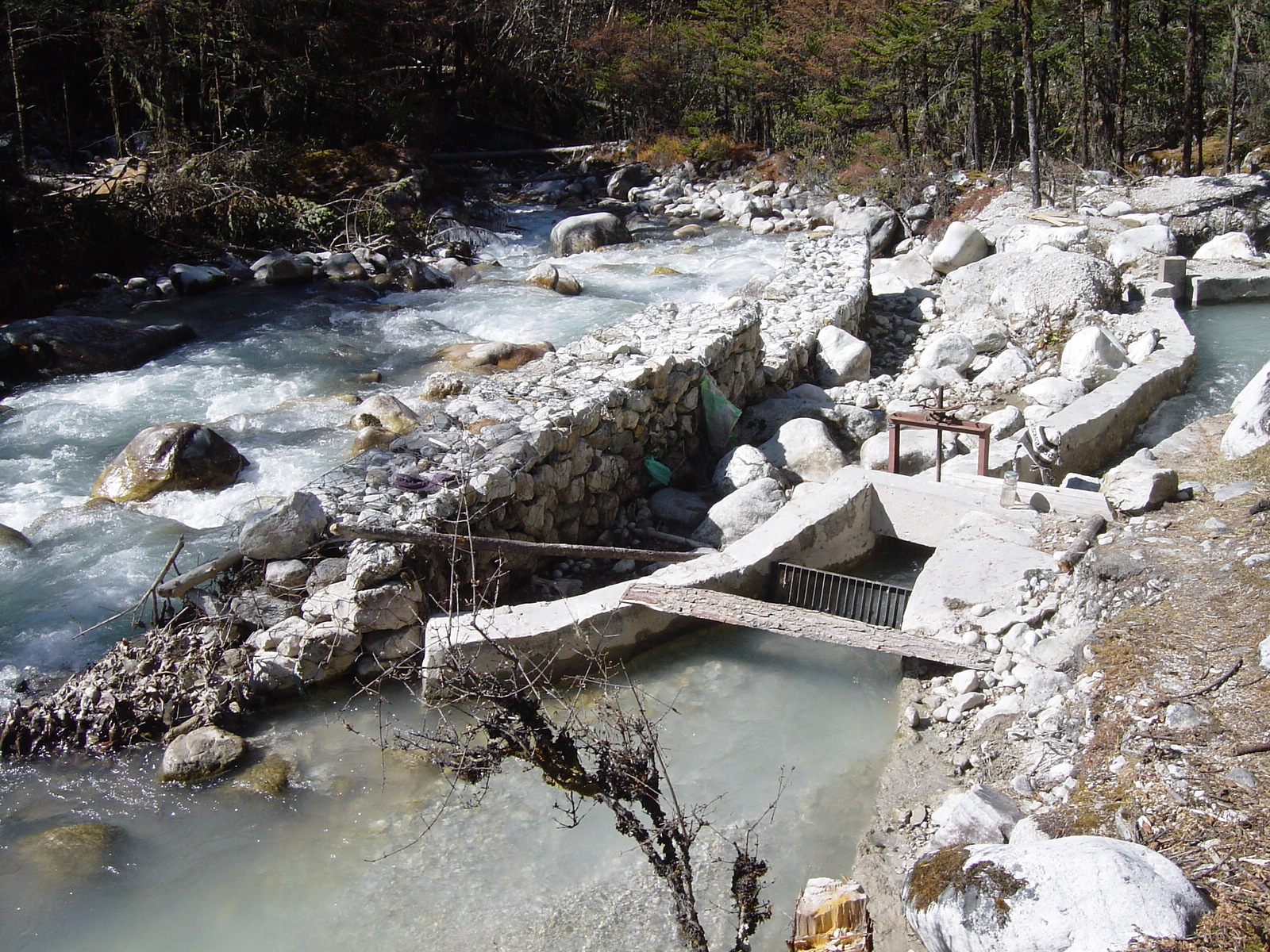
Intake

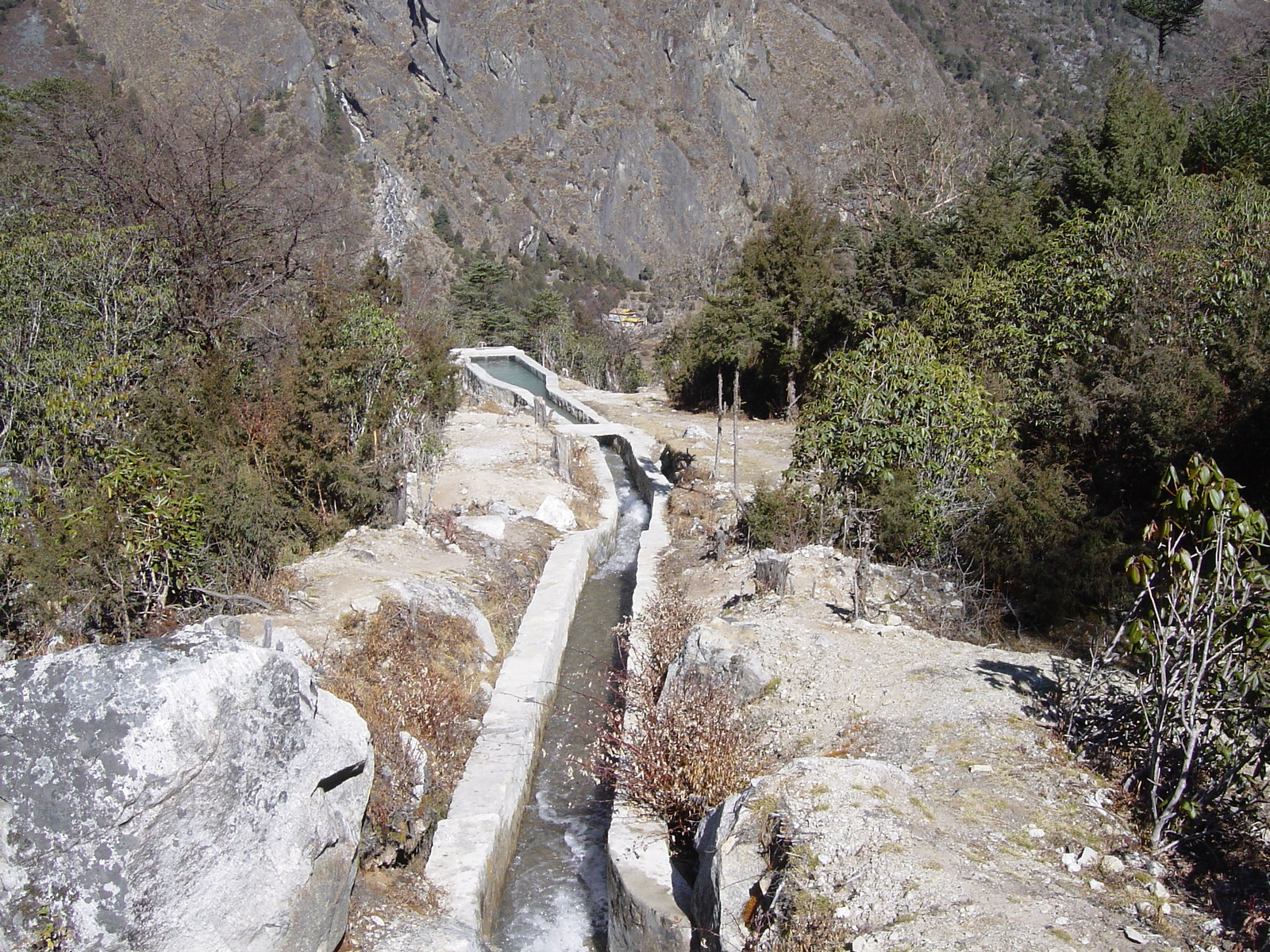
Canal

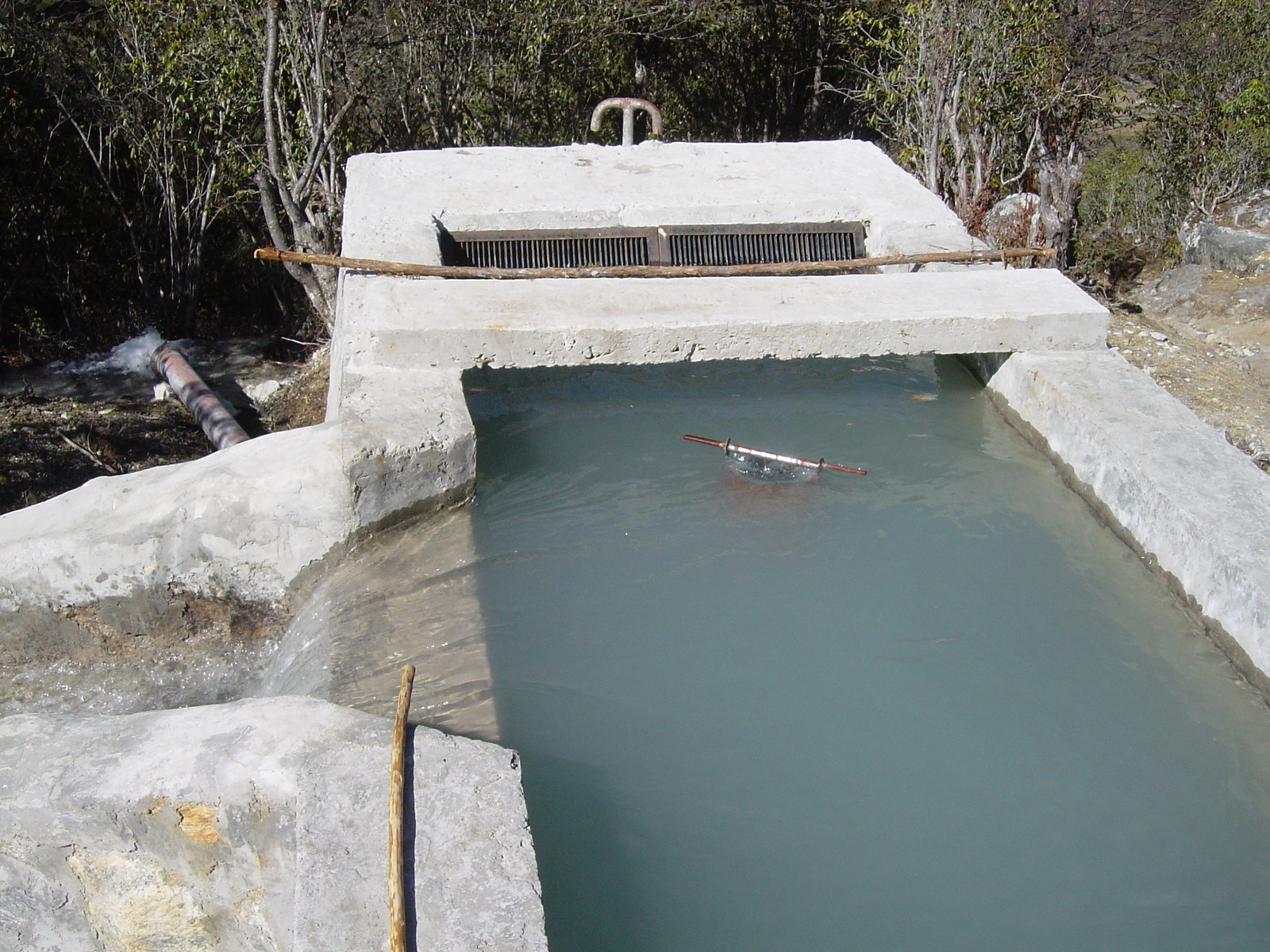
Forebay

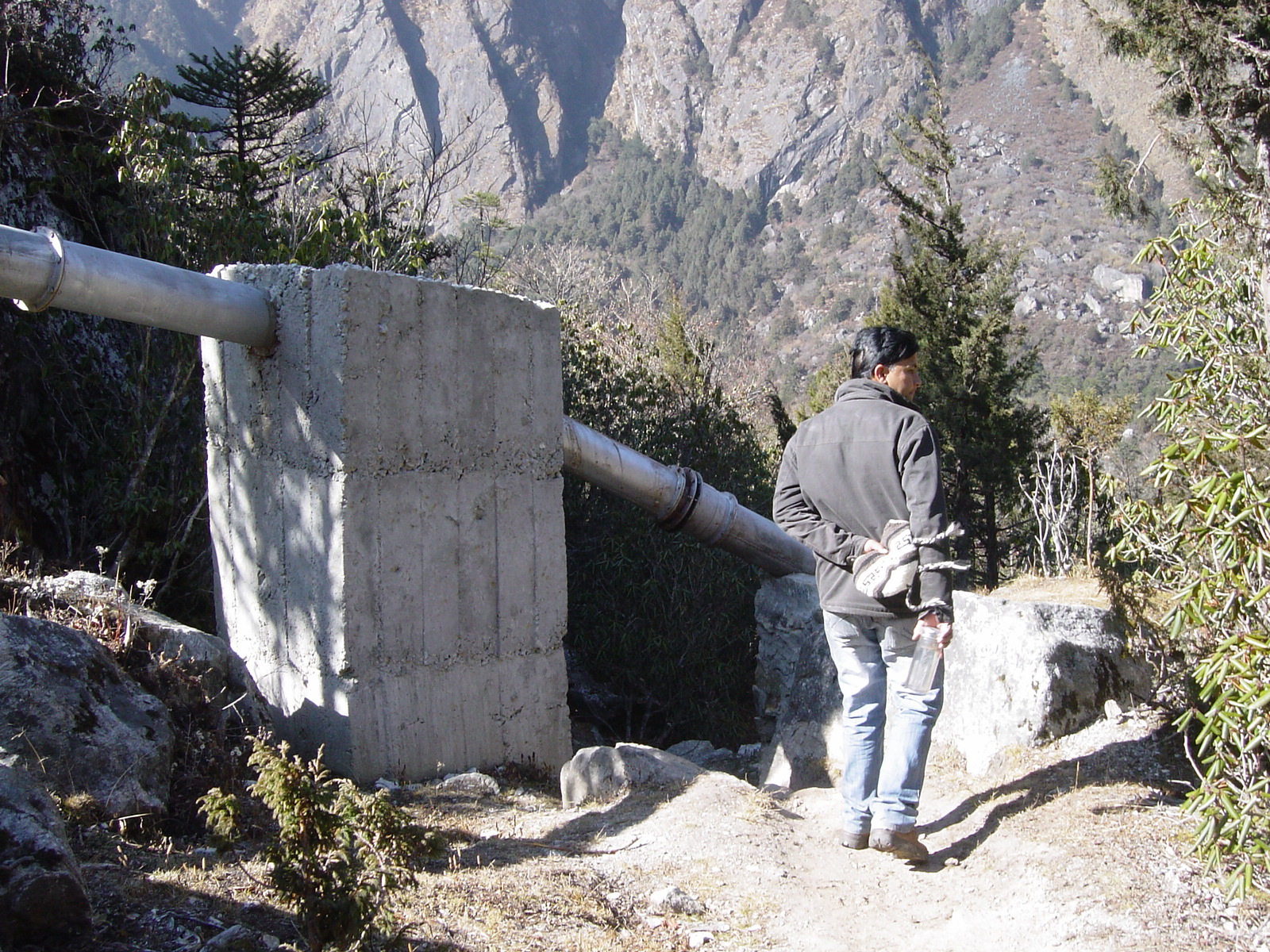
Penstock

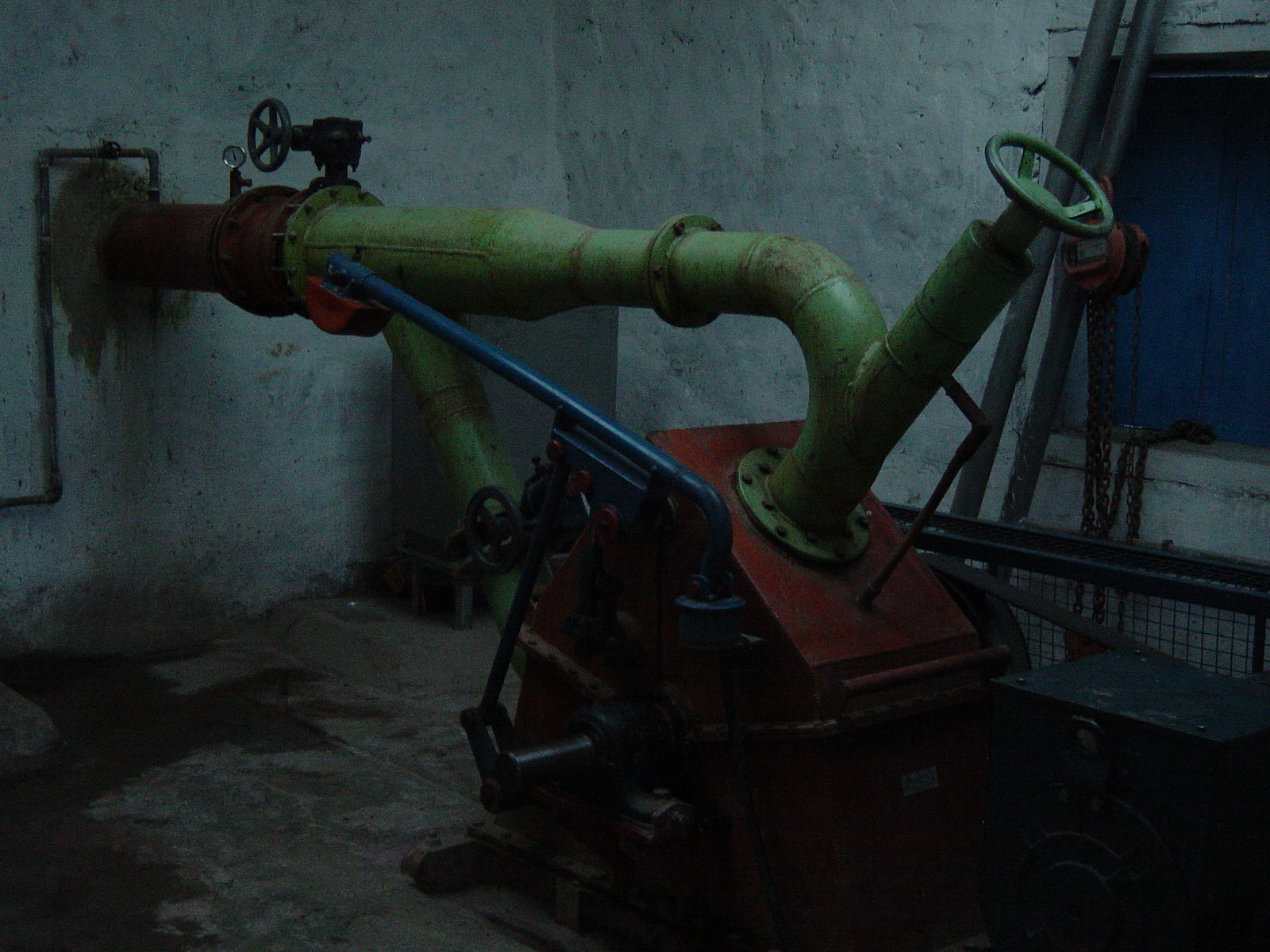
Turbine
