= Paulo Marques =

Paulo Marques may refer to:

- Paulo Marques (journalist) (1948–2006), Brazilian journalist, broadcaster and politician
- Paulo Lowndes Marques (1941–2011), Portuguese politician, lawyer, author, historian and conservationist
- Paulo Henrique Marques (born 1965), Brazilian footballer and manager
