= 1865 United Kingdom general election =

- 11–24 July 1865

All 658 seats in the House of Commons 330 seats needed for a majority
- Turnout: 854,856
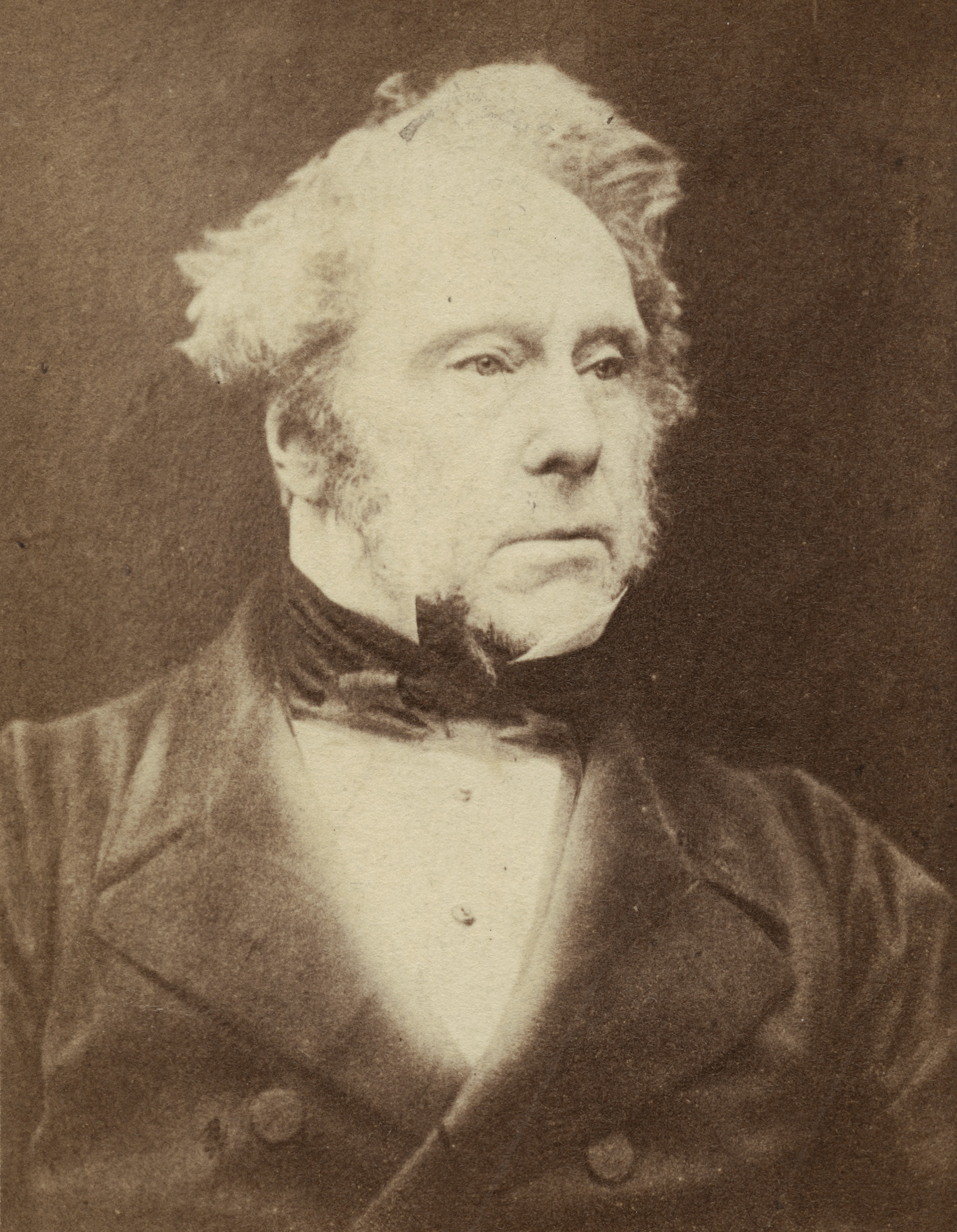

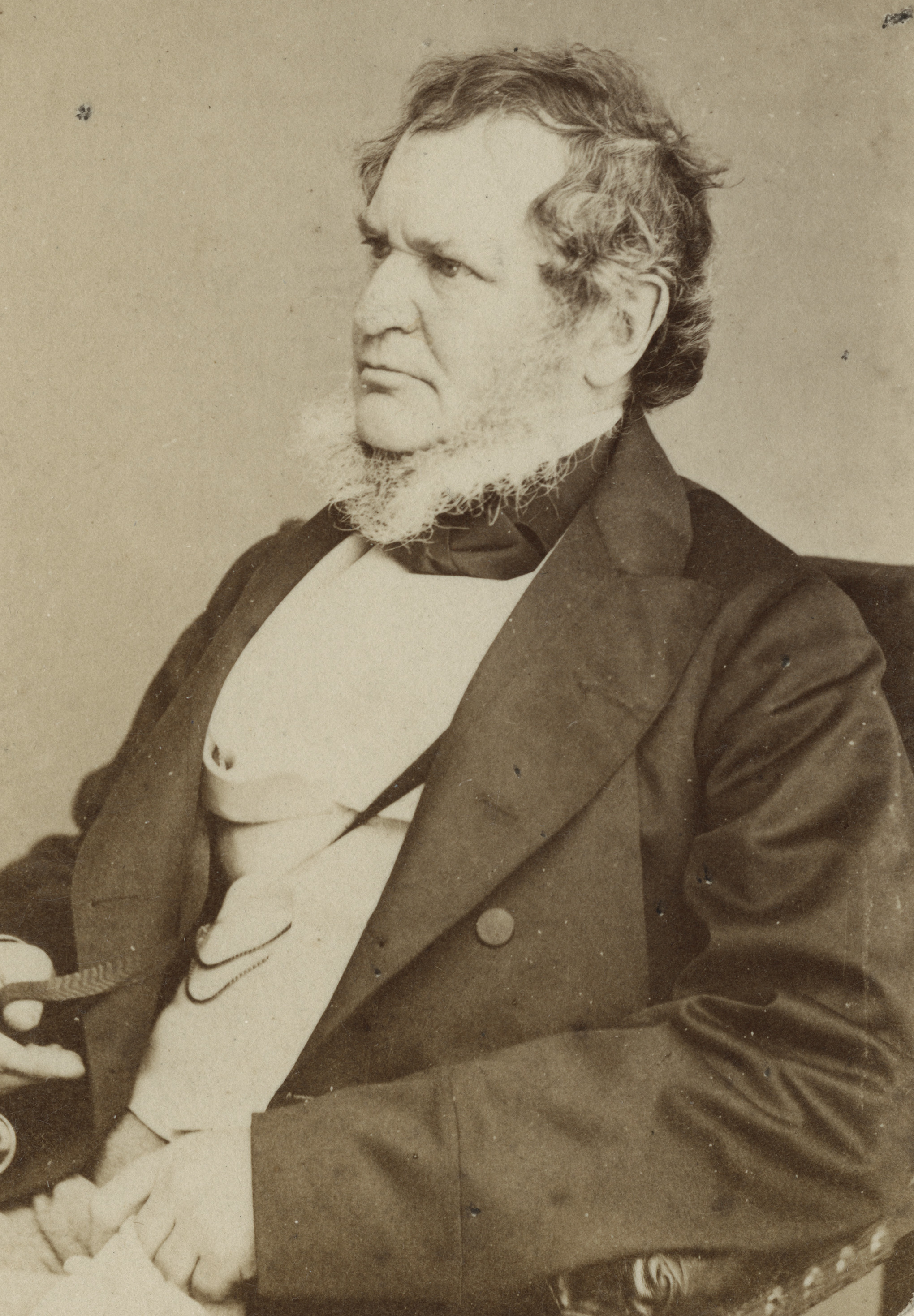
	First party	Second party
Leader	Viscount Palmerston	Earl of Derby
Party	Liberal	Conservative
Leader since	12 June 1859	July 1846
Leader's seat	Tiverton	House of Lords
Last election	356 seats, 65.8%	298 seats, 34.2%
Seats won	369 (Note: The seat and vote count figures for the Liberals given here include the Speaker of the House of Commons)	289
Seat change	▲13	▼9
Popular vote	508,821	346,035
Percentage	59.5%	40.5%
Swing	▼6.3 pp	▲6.3 pp
- Colours denote the winning party—as shown in § Results

- Composition of the House of Commons after the election
Prime Minister before election
Viscount Palmerston
Liberal
Prime Minister after election
Viscount Palmerston
Liberal

The 1865 United Kingdom general election was held 7 July 1865 to 24 July 1865 to elect 658 members of the House of Commons. It saw the Liberals, led by Lord Palmerston, increase their large majority over the Earl of Derby's Conservatives to 80.

Palmerston died in October the same year and was succeeded by Lord John Russell as Prime Minister. Despite the Liberal majority, the party was divided by the issue of further parliamentary reform, and Russell resigned after being defeated in a vote in the House of Commons in 1866, leading to minority Conservative governments under Derby and then Benjamin Disraeli.

This was the last United Kingdom general election until 2019 where a party increased its majority after having been returned to office at the previous election with a reduced majority.

== Corruption ==
The 1865 general election was regarded by contemporaries as being a generally dull contest nationally, which exaggerated the degree of corruption within individual constituencies. In his PhD thesis, Cornelius O'Leary described The Times as having reported "the testimony is unanimous that in the General Election of 1865 there was more profuse and corrupt expenditure than was ever known before". As a result of allegations of corruption, 50 election petitions were lodged, of which 35 were pressed to a trial; 13 ended with the elected MP being unseated. In four cases a Royal Commission had to be appointed because of widespread corrupt practices in the constituency.

As a result, when he became Prime Minister in 1867, Benjamin Disraeli announced that he would introduce a new method for election petition trials, which were then determined by a committee of the House of Commons, resulting in the Parliamentary Elections Act 1868, whereby two Judges of the Court of Common Pleas, Exchequer of Pleas or Queen's Bench would be designated to try election petitions with full judicial salaries.

== Constituencies ==
Many new constituencies were used for this election:

- Northern West Riding of Yorkshire
- Southern West Riding of Yorkshire

== Results ==

UK General Election 1865
Party	Candidates						Votes		
Party	Stood	Elected	Gained	Unseated	Net	% of total	%	No.	Net %
Liberal	516	369			+13	56.08	59.52	508,821	−6.2
Conservative	406	289			−9	43.92	40.48	346,035	+6.2
Total		658			+4	100	100	854,856	

=== Voting summary ===
Popular vote
Liberal	59.52%
Conservative	40.48%

=== Seats summary ===
Parliamentary seats
Liberal	56.08%
Conservative	43.92%

=== Regional results ===
==== Great Britain ====
Party	Candidates	Unopposed	Seats	Seats change	Votes	%	% change
Liberal	433	133	311	▲5	457,289	60.0	
Conservative	347	115	244	▼1	304,538	40.0	
Total	780	248	555	Same position	761,827	100	

===== England =====
Party	Candidates	Unopposed	Seats	Seats change	Votes	%	% change
Liberal	359	88	251	Same position	406,978	59.0	
Conservative	308	94	213	▲4	291,238	41.0	
Total	667	182	464	▲4	698,216	100	

===== Scotland =====
Party	Candidates	Unopposed	Seats	Seats change	Votes	%	% change
Liberal	51	30	42	▲2	43,480	85.4	
Conservative	17	7	11	▼2	4,305	14.6	
Total	68	37	53	Same position	47,785	100	

===== Wales =====
Party	Candidates	Unopposed	Seats	Seats change	Votes	%	% change
Liberal	21	15	18	▲3	4,565	74.0	
Conservative	16	12	14	▼3	1,600	26.0	
Total	37	27	32	Same position	6,165	100	

==== Ireland ====
Party	Candidates	Unopposed	Seats	Seats change	Votes	%	% change
Liberal	83	28	58	▲8	51,532	55.6	
Irish Conservative	59	27	45	▼8	41,497	44.4	
Total	142	55	103	Same position	93,029	100	

==== Universities ====
Party	Candidates	Unopposed	Seats	Seats change	Votes	%	% change
Conservative	6	2	6		7,395	76.5	
Liberal	2	0	0		2,266	23.5	
Total	8	2	6		9,661	100	

Source: Rallings & Thrasher 2012, pp. 8–9

== See also ==
- List of MPs elected in the 1865 United Kingdom general election
- 1865 United Kingdom general election in Ireland

== Sources and further reading ==
- Craig, F. W. S. (1989), British Electoral Facts: 1832–1987, Dartmouth: Gower, ISBN 0900178302
- Crewe, Ivor (2006), "New Labour's Hegemony: Extension or Erosion?", in Bartle, John; King, Anthony (eds.), Britain at the Polls 2005, Washington, D.C.: CQ Press, p. 204
- Everett, Jason M., ed. (2006), "1865", The People's Chronology, Thomson Gale
- Kelly, Richard; Hamlyn, Matthew (2013), "The Law and Conduct of MPs", in Horne, Alexander; Drewry, Gavin; Oliver, Dawn (eds.), Parliament and the Law, Bloomsbury Publishing, ISBN 978-1-7822-5258-0
- O'Leary, Cornelius (1962), The Elimination of Corrupt Practices in British Elections 1868–1911, Oxford: Oxford University Press
- Rallings, Colin; Thrasher, Michael, eds. (2000), British Electoral Facts 1832–1999, Ashgate Publishing Ltd
- Rallings, Colin; Thrasher, Michael, eds. (2012), British Electoral Facts 1832–2012, London: Biteback, ISBN 978-1-84954-134-3
- Roberts, Matthew. "Election Cartoons and Political Communication in Victorian England" Cultural & Social History (2013) 10#3 pp 369–395, covers 1860 to 1890.
