= Guy François =

Guy François may refer to:

- Guy François (painter) (1578–1650), French painter
- Guy François (colonel) (died 2006), colonel from Haiti
- Guy François (footballer) (1947–2019), football player from Haiti
