= AEPC =

AEPC may refer to:

- Africa Evangelical Presbyterian Church, a church in Kenya
- Alternative Energy Promotion Centre, an institution in Nepal
