= Chesbro =

Chesbro may refer to:

Surname:

- George C. Chesbro, American author
- Jack Chesbro, baseball player
- Tommy Chesbro, wrestler and coach
- Wesley Chesbro, a politician

Place:

- Chesbro Reservoir

Business:

- Chesbro Music Company
