= The Secret Service: The Hidden History of an Enigmatic Agency =

- Author: Philip H. Melanson and Peter F. Stevens
- Language: English
- Genre: Non-fiction
- Published: 2002
- Publisher: Carroll & Graf
- Publication place: United States
- ISBN: 978-0-7867-1084-3

The Secret Service: The Hidden History of an Enigmatic Agency is a book by Philip H. Melanson and Peter F. Stevens about the history of the United States Secret Service. The book was first published in 2002 by Carroll & Graf Publishers.

The book contains interviews with former White House staffers, retired agents, and the first female agent to serve on the presidential's security detail.

== Reception ==
The book has received reviews from publications including Booklist, Publishers Weekly, and Kirkus Reviews.

Publishers Weekly stated the book was a "comprehensive, sometimes critical and often dry history" with "all aspects of the agency's work are covered extensively: recruiting, training, intelligence gathering, the often-tense relationship between the agency and the people it tries to protect" and that it is "a worthwhile book for assassination buffs and those with an interest in the inner workings of government".

Kirkus Reviews stated "In mining the relationship between the agency and presidential families it has served, Melanson provides some fascinating insights" and that the book as a whole was "somewhat plodding, but with gems along the path".
