= Mingma Norbu Sherpa =

Nepalese Himalayan conservationist

Mingma Norbu Sherpa (October 31, 1955 – September 23, 2006) was a pioneering figure in Himalayan conservation, known for his efforts in environmental protection and sustainable natural resource management. He was born in Khunde village within the Sherpa homeland of Khumbu (now Sagarmatha National Park) in Nepal.

== Early life and education ==
Sherpa was born in the Khunde village. He was proficient in several local languages, and also English, and began working as a translator for visiting trekkers and conservationists in his teens. His dedication caught the attention of Sir Edmund Hillary, the first Westerner to scale Mount Everest in 1953, who became his mentor.

Mingma was part of the inaugural class of the first school established by Hillary in the Everest region. He went on to graduate from Lincoln College (now Lincoln University) in 1980, receiving a diploma in Parks and Recreation. Continuing his academics, he earned a master's degree in natural resources management from the University of Manitoba in 1985.

== Conservation Efforts ==
Mingma played a pivotal role in the establishment of the Annapurna Conservation Area in 1985, where he later served as the first director.

== Career ==
He began his tenure at Sagarmatha National Park as a ranger in 1980, quickly rising to become the park's first Sherpa warden within six months.

In 1989, he joined the World Wildlife Fund (WWF), where he directed programs in Nepal, Bhutan, and the Terai Arc region of Nepal and India. Among his numerous achievements, Mingma led initiatives to protect endangered wildlife, including the Bengal tiger and the Greater One-horned Rhinoceros.

== Legacy ==
The annual Mingma Norbu Sherpa Community Engagement Fellowship, established in his honor, provides financial support to graduate and professional students conducting field study and engaged research in environmental areas.

=== Memorial scholarships ===
In commemoration of Mingma's contributions, various organizations have established scholarships and awards in his name. The Mingma Norbu Sherpa Memorial Scholarships, supported by WWF, Lincoln University, and the Greater Himalayan Foundation, assist Nepalese students pursuing careers in nature conservation. Mingma's influence extended beyond Nepal, as evidenced by his involvement with WWF's Tibet program, where he played a pivotal role in shaping public opinion on environmental conservation issues.

== Personal life and death ==
Mingma Norbu Sherpa was killed in a helicopter crash on September 23, 2006, along with 23 other conservationists. Mingma is survived by his wife and their two children.

== Recognition ==
In recognition of his contributions to conservation, Mingma Norbu Sherpa was posthumously awarded the Order of the Golden Ark Award by His Royal Highness Prince Bernard of the Netherlands.

== See also ==
- Edmund Hillary
- Chandra Gurung
