= Butenko =

Butenko (Ukrainian: Бутенко) is a surname of Ukrainian origin. Notable people with the surname include:

- Aleksandr Butenko (born 1998), Russian footballer
- Anatoliy Butenko (1938–2021), Ukrainian politician
- Bohdan Butenko (1933–2019), Polish cartoonist
- Boris Butenko (1923–1999), Soviet athlete
- Borys Butenko (died 1940), Minister of Communications of Ukraine (1918)
- Eduard Butenko (1941–2006), Russian actor and theatre director
- Roman Butenko (1980–2012), Ukrainian footballer
- Sergei Butenko (born 1960), Russian football coach and former player
- Valeri Butenko (1941–2020), Soviet footballer
