= Philip Fulford =

Surgeon Captain Philip Charles Fulford, CVO OBE, senior naval medical officer.

Former consultant orthopaedic surgeon and professor of naval surgery. He was born in 1930, and qualified in London in 195, with MCh(Orth) (gold medal), FRCS.

He entered the Royal Navy in 1955 and joined RN Hospital Haslar in 1967 as a consultant orthopaedic surgeon. Until 1977 he was medical officer to the Queen on overseas tours. Most of his practice was in Haslar, and in 1969 he became professor of naval surgery. He had a deep compassion for his patients, and his competence and dexterity enticed many subordinates into his specialty. After retirement from the navy as surgeon captain he continued in practice and joined the editorial staff of the Journal of Bone and Joint Surgery in 1986, serving as editor from 1994 to 1998. He continued medical writing and editing and was chairman of the clinical research ethical committee at the Royal Defence Medical College.

He died after a long illness on 11 April 2000.
