= Henri Thellin =

Belgian footballer (1931–2006)

Personal information
- Date of birth: 27 August 1931
- Date of death: 17 September 2006 (aged 75)
- Position: Defender

Senior career*
Years	Team	Apps	(Gls)
1949–1965	Standard Liège		

International career
1958–1961	Belgium	16	(0)
- * Club domestic league appearances and goals

Henri Thellin (27 August 1931 – 17 September 2006) was a Belgian footballer who played as a defender for Standard Liège. He made 16 appearances for the Belgium national team from 1958 to 1961.
