= Alternative Energy Promotion Centre =

Government agency of Nepal

- वैकल्पिक उर्जा प्रवर्द्धन केन्द्र

Agency overview
- Formed: 1996
- Jurisdiction: Nepal
- Headquarters: Tahachal, Kathmandu, Nepal
- Agency executive: Nawa Raj Dhakal, Executive Director
- Parent agency: Ministry of Energy, Water Resources and Irrigation, Government of Nepal
- Website: www.aepc.gov.np

The Alternative Energy Promotion Centre (AEPC; Nepali: वैकल्पिक ऊर्जा प्रवर्द्धन केन्द्र, Vaikalpik Urja Pravardhan Kendra) is an independently functioning government institution established by the Government of Nepal with the objectives to popularize and promote the use of renewable energy technologies, raise the living standards of the rural people, protect the environment, and develop commercially viable renewable energy industries in the country. It is governed by nine member board representing government, non-government, industry and financial sectors. AEPC was established on November 3, 1996 (Kartik 18, 2053 B.S.) under then Ministry of Science and Technology of the Government of Nepal. Currently, it is under the Ministry of Energy, Water Resources and Irrigation.

According to The Guardian the solar box system uses copper indium gallium selenide solar cells (CIGS) that are bonded with a tensile fabric. The strength of the combined material can cope with being rolled in and out, and it can be in full operation a few minutes after it is deployed. “It is like a microgrid in a box. It has all of the components integrated into it that you need to run a 24 hour microgrid.”

== See also ==
- Micro hydropower in Nepal
