= Thor Moxnes =

Norwegian footballer (1924-2006)

Personal information
- Date of birth: 7 January 1924
- Date of death: 28 September 2006 (aged 82)

International career
Years	Team	Apps	(Gls)
1948	Norway	5	(0)

Thor Moxnes (7 January 1924 – 28 September 2006) was a Norwegian footballer. He played in five matches for the Norway national football team in 1948.
