= Norman Blacklock =

British surgeon and professor of medicine

Sir Norman James Blacklock KCVO OBE FRCS (5 February 1928 – 7 September 2006) was a surgeon in the Royal Navy and later a consultant in urology and professor of medicine at Manchester University. He served as Medical Officer to The Queen on her overseas tours for 17 years, from 1976 to 1993. He became known to the accompanying press corps as "the Queen's Witch Doctor", and Prince Philip, Duke of Edinburgh nicknamed him "Hemlock". He was appointed an Extra Gentleman Usher in 1993.

== Biography ==
Blacklock was born in Glasgow. His family were doctors with leanings towards the Royal Navy. Evacuated from his home in the Second World War, he was educated at McLaren High School in Callander, and read medicine at Glasgow University. He worked as a junior registrar at Glasgow Royal Infirmary and the Western Infirmary in Glasgow, and then did National Service in the Royal Navy from 1951, serving on board HMS Theseus and HMS Warrior, treating trauma cases.

He returned to medicine in 1954, working as a surgical registrar and lecturer in surgery at Glasgow Royal Infirmary, and then at hospitals in Ipswich and London from 1956. He married Marjorie Reid in 1956, and they had one daughter (Fiona) and one son (Neil) together, both of whom became doctors.

He rejoined the Royal Navy in 1958 to help fill a shortage of surgeons, and served at Navy hospitals in Chatham, Plymouth, Malta and Haslar in Gosport. At Gosport, he started to specialise in urology, founding a new department.

He was appointed the director of surgical research in the Royal Navy in 1974, when he was also appointed OBE. He stood in as Medical Officer to the Queen on a royal visit to Luxembourg in 1976, when the incumbent surgeon fell ill at the last minute, and he continued in that role until 1993. He was always well prepared: the HMY Britannia contained a full operating theatre; aircraft of the Queen's Flight carried emergency medical equipment; and he carried a case containing medical supplies, a resuscitator and a defibrillator; but his services were seldom required. He also co-ordinated with local hospitals, and ensured that food served in host countries was acceptable. In Belize, he approved a local delicacy, the gibnut (a large rodent). He was appointed CVO in 1989, and advanced to KCVO and appointed an Extra Gentleman Usher in 1993, after his last royal tour to Hungary. In 1990, Blacklock was awarded the New Zealand 1990 Commemoration Medal.

After retiring from the Royal Navy in 1978, with the rank of Surgeon Captain, he became professor of urology at the Victoria University of Manchester. He was based at Withington Hospital in West Didsbury, Manchester, where he set up the first NHS lithotriptor unit, using ultrasound to break down kidney stones. He published over 80 academic papers and contributed to numerous textbooks. He gave up his chair in 1992.

He died on the afternoon of his 50th wedding anniversary after a fall on a staircase in Portsmouth.
