= Efraim Allsalu =

Estonian painter

Efraim Allsalu (20 February 1929 – 7 September 2006) was an Estonian painter.

He was born and died in Tartu.
