= Gordon Manning =

American journalist

- Born: May 28, 1917
- Died: September 6, 2006 (aged 89)

John Gordon Manning Jr. (28 May 1917 – 6 September 2006) was a news executive at CBS and NBC and a former executive editor at Newsweek. Manning is credited with arranging the first interview between Soviet leader Mikhail S. Gorbachev and an American correspondent and an exclusive interview with Soviet dissident Aleksandr Solzhenitsyn shortly after Solzhenitsyn's exile from the Soviet Union in 1974.

== Biography ==
Manning was born in New Haven, Connecticut. He grew up in Lancaster, Pennsylvania, where his parents worked in a watchmaking factory. He graduated from Boston University in 1941, having served as editor of the student newspaper in college.

Manning joined the staff of United Press in Boston. During World War II he served in the Navy.

=== Journalism career ===
After the war, Manning worked in a series of menial editing jobs until he was assigned to write a feature article on New York Yankees catcher Yogi Berra for Collier's magazine. The response to that feature resulted in Manning being hired as a managing editor at Collier's.

When Collier's ceased publication, Manning joined the staff of Newsweek. Manning's coverage of the 1964 Alaska earthquake was noticed by Fred Friendly, then-president of CBS News, who was disappointed with the CBS staff's slow response to the disaster. Friendly hired Manning to be the news division's senior vice president, a position he held until 1975, when a demotion resulting from internal politics caused him to jump to NBC News.

=== Accomplishments ===
While at CBS News, Manning helped direct coverage of the Vietnam War and the Watergate scandal. He urged the network to air a two-part special report by Walter Cronkite on Watergate that brought national attention to what had been a Washington Post story.

In May, 1970, six members of a CBS News camera team disappeared in Cambodia while covering the civil war there. Manning flew to the scene and hired a Cambodian Army unit to protect him in the search for the missing journalists. Four of them, led by correspondent George Syvertsen, were discovered in shallow graves near the side of a road where they had been ambushed and killed by the Khmer Rouge. Manning supervised the recovery of the bodies and evacuation to their homes for proper burials.

When President Nixon attempted to normalize relations with mainland China, Manning tried to arrange an interview with the Chinese representative to the United Nations, Huang Hua. Huang rebuffed Manning. Manning bought all the first class seats on an Air France flight Huang was taking from Paris to New York. Manning instructed the flight attendants to serve unlimited champagne to Huang. When Manning, accompanied by Cronkite and a cameraman, approached Huang later in the flight, the ambassador provided CBS with an in-flight interview that contrasted sharply with the terse statement he made to the reporters upon arrival in New York.

=== Death ===
Manning died at Norwalk Hospital in Connecticut, aged 89. The cause of death was congestive heart failure.
