= Lillian Robinson =

American Marxist feminist activist, writer, and theorist

Lillian Sara Robinson (April 18, 1941 – September 20, 2006) was an American Marxist feminist activist, writer, and theorist. She was the principal of the Simone de Beauvoir Institute and professor of Women's studies at Concordia University at the time of her death. She is described as "revolutionary, Marxist, and feminist...an activist student".

== Life ==
Robinson grew up in New York City, the child of Jewish immigrants. She earned a B.A./M.A. degree at Brown University in 1962, and a Ph.D. from Columbia University. Her dissertation was published in 1985. Throughout her life, Robinson was actively involved in various civil and human rights struggles. She marched against the US war in Vietnam, racism, and, shortly before her death, also worked with the Jewish Alliance Against the Occupation branch in Montreal, Quebec, Canada.

Her work in women's studies was groundbreaking for its time. She insisted that "gender could not usefully be studied except in relationship to race and class". Her views on this matter are expounded upon in her work Sex, Class, and Culture. A particularly noteworthy article in this book on the importance of examining race and class is "Who's Afraid of a Room of One's Own?" in which she discusses developments in the realm of sexuality and politics as it pertains to women since Virginia Woolf's time. She argues that class plays a much greater role in determining what kind of place and identity a woman has in society, which was not thoroughly examined in Woolf's work A Room of One's Own. She also argues that the sexual freedom that women have gained since the sexual revolution has come at a cost, that in fact "permission to be unchaste has not freed women from the object-role we occupied when it was chastity that was the valued commodity".

Professor Robinson was Poet in Residence at Albright College in Reading Pennsylvania during the 1984–1985 academic year.

Lillian Robinson died of ovarian cancer in Montreal, Quebec, Canada on September 20, 2006.

== Selected works ==
- In The Night Kitchen, in Beefsteak Begonia, (May, 1976) Buffalo, New York.
- The Old Life: Five Reactionary Poems for Dick. Designed, illustrated and printed by Patricia Malanowicz, 110 copies, 1976.
- Sex, Class, and Culture. Bloomington: Indiana State Press, 1978.
- Monstrous Regiment: The Lady Knight in Sixteenth Century Epic. New York: Garland Pub., 1985.
- Modern Women Writers. ed. Robinson, Lillian. New York: Continuum, 1996.
- Bishop, Ryan and Robinson, Lillian. Night Market: Sexual Cultures and the Thai Economic Miracle. New York: Routledge, 1998.
- Wonder Women: Feminisms and Superheroes. New York: Routledge, 2004.
