= Babenko =

Babenko (Ukrainian: Бабенко) is a surname. Notable people with the name include:

- Aleksei Babenko (born 1972), Russian footballer
- Alexandr Babenko (born 1980), Kazakhstani ski-orienteer
- Dmytro Babenko (born 1978), Ukrainian footballer
- Dmitry Babenko (born 1985), Kazakhstani speed skater
- Ruslan Babenko (born 1992), Ukrainian footballer
- Sergei Babenko (disambiguation), multiple individuals
- Valery Babenko (born 1964), Ukrainian politician
- Yuliya Babenko (born 1991), Ukrainian Master on Jack-Up barge
- Yuri Babenko (born 1978), Russian ice hockey player

== See also ==
- Babenko–Beckner inequality
- Babenco
