= Medical Officer to The King =

Overseas health overseer for the monarch of England

A Medical Officer to The King (or Medical Officer to The Queen) is a health overseer that accompanies the monarch on overseas tours.

He is normally a senior Royal Navy surgeon. He is not, strictly, a member of the Medical Household of the Royal Household of the sovereign of the United Kingdom.

During Royal Tours, he is described as "The Medical Officer to The King/Queen Abroad."

== List of officers ==
Position	Name	Honorary titles	Years of service	Reference
Surgeon Captain	David Hett	CVO, MRCS, RCP, FRCA	2007–2023	
Surgeon Captain	David Swain	CVO, ChB, FFARCS, DObst RCOG, QHP	1993–2007	
Surgeon Captain	Norman Blacklock	KCVO, OBE, ChB, FRCS	1976–1993	
Surgeon Commander	Philip Fulford	MVO	1967–1977	
Surgeon Vice-Admiral	Sir Derek Steele-Perkins	KCB, KCVO, FRACS, QHS	c. 1953 – c. 1963	
Surgeon Rear-Admiral	Sir Henry White	KCVO, OBE, ChB, FRCSEdin	c. 1920 – c. 1947	
