= Christopher Essex =

Australian fashion designer

- Born: April 1945; England
- Died: 13 September 2006 (aged 61); Westmead, New South Wales, Australia
- Occupations: Costumer, fashion designer
- Known for: Party dresses; ready-to-wear; theatrical and film costume

Christopher Essex (April 1945 – 13 September 2006) was an English Australian customer and fashion designer whose client list included Tina Turner, Phyllis Diller, Dionne Warwick and Gail Lewis-Bearman. He was best known of his chic party dresses, ready-to-wear dresses and theatrical costumes. Apart from being an Australian designer, he worked internationally with salons in England and the United States.

== Biography ==
Essex grew up in Australia, attending the Australian Fashion Institute. He began his career by designing decorative accessories and casual outfits for men and women and displays at Mark Foy's, Sydney's leading department store at that time.

In the 1960s he opened his first salon, "Camille", in Hong Kong. Camille's customers included Bruce Lee and actress Nancy Kwan

An initial bout with cancer prompted Essex to return to Australia. His successful recovery prompted him to re-establish his career, designing costumes for stage productions such as Get Happy, Private Lives, Hot Shoe Shuffle and Little Shop of Horrors and the film Strictly Ballroom.

Essex succumbed to a second bout of cancer at age 61. He died at Westmead Private Hospital in Westmead a suburb of Sydney, New South Wales.
