= Safia Amajan =

Afghan woman's rights activist

- Born: 1941
- Died: 25 September 2006 (aged 64–65)
- Children: 1

Safia Amajan (1941–25 September 2006), also spelt Ama-jan, Ama Jan, Ahmed-jan and Ahmed Jan, was an Afghan women's rights activist, educator, politician, and critic of the Taliban's suppression of women, who was shot and killed in 2006, reportedly by the Taliban.

== Life ==
Amajan worked as teacher and principal in Kandahar prior to the rise of the Taliban in 1996. During the subsequent Taliban regime, during which all girls' schools were closed, Amajan secretly taught girls at her home.

Following the defeat of the Taliban in 2001, Amajan served as the provincial director for the Ministry of Women's Affairs' office in Kandahar Province, a role she held from 2002 until her death. During her tenure, Amajan opened multiple vocational colleges, training hundreds of women in trades including baking and tailoring.

== Death ==
On 25 September 2006, as Amajan was leaving her home for work in Kandahar, she was shot four times and killed by two men on a motorcycle. Amajan had previously asked the Afghan government to provide her with personal bodyguards in light of death threats from Taliban-led insurgents, but her request had been rejected. Amajan's murder was condemned by Hamid Karzai, then-President of Afghanistan, and the United Nations Assistance Mission in Afghanistan. Following her death, an alleged Taliban spokesperson stated Amajan's death had been in response to her working for the government.

Amajan was survived by her son, Naqibullah.
