= Donald Kimball =

American priest

Donald Wren Kimball (December 10, 1943 — September 15, 2006) was a Roman Catholic priest with a radio ministry directed toward youth, until he was removed from the priesthood over allegations of sexual abuse.

== Early life ==
Kimball was born in Santa Rosa, California. His father was killed during World War II.

Kimball graduated from St. Vincent de Paul High School in Petaluma, California, and attended St. Joseph's Seminary in Mountain View, California.

In the 1970s he developed a religious radio program that targeted young people. The award-winning show blended top 40 pop music with Bible teachings.

== Scandal ==
Kimball was accused of using his charm and popularity to coerce teenage girls into having sex with him. In 1990 he acknowledged having sexual contact with six young girls and church officials forced him to give up his youth ministry. He was also suspended from performing priestly duties.

Pope John Paul II formally removed Kimball from the priesthood in 2000, the same year criminal sex abuse charges were filed against Kimball.

In 2002, Kimball was acquitted of raping a 14-year-old girl in 1977, but convicted of molesting a 13-year-old girl in 1981. The conviction was overturned in 2003 when the U.S. Supreme Court overturned a California law extending the statute of limitations for sex crimes involving children.

In February 2003, Kimball was convicted on charges of felony assault and vandalism stemming from the 2002 trial. He had shoved the camera of a San Francisco Chronicle reporter into her face and then threw the camera onto the floor. In June, he was sentenced to three years in prison. However, Kimball was released from prison in September 2003 after the judge reduced his sentence to time served, plus probation, 200 hours of community service, and $11,735 in fines.

== Death ==
Kimball's body was discovered in the home of a friend in Windsor, California. The Sonoma County Sheriff's Department said there were no signs of criminal activity. An autopsy confirmed that the death was by natural causes, a heart attack.

== See also ==
- Roman Catholic Church sex abuse scandal
- Roman Catholic priests accused of sex offenses
- Crimen sollicitationis
