= Gilbert Jonas =

Gilbert Maurice Jonas (July 22, 1930 – September 21, 2006), was an American businessman and long-time fundraiser for the NAACP.

Born in Brooklyn, Jonas graduated from Stanford University in 1951, and earned a master's degree in international affairs from Columbia University. After a stint in the Army's public information office, he served as a public relations adviser to the African independence movement in the late 1950s. Later he became acting director of the Far East section of the Peace Corps.

From 1962 till the mid-1990s, Jonas ran the Gilbert Jonas Company, a public relations and fund-raising firm based in Manhattan where he lived. Active in progressive political causes, Jonas served as the N.A.A.C.P.'s chief fund-raiser from 1965 to 1995, helping to raise $110 million for the organization during that period.

In June 1995, Jonas filed suit against the N.A.A.C.P., charging fiscal impropriety and back pay and damages. The suit was settled out of court later that summer, with the N.A.A.C.P. agreeing to pay Mr. Jonas's back pay.

In 2005, Jonas published the book Freedom's Sword: The NAACP and the Struggle Against Racism in America, 1909-1969, with a foreword by civil-rights leader Julian Bond.

He is survived by three daughters, Susan Dale Jonas, Jillian Dana Jonas and Stephanie Drew Jonas Stone. His first wife was Barbara Lynn Selby. His second wife Paulette Joyce Thiese.
