= Silverio Pérez (bullfighter) =

Mexican matador (1915–2006)

Silverio Pérez (20 June 1915 – 2 September 2006) was a Mexican matador whose nickname was "The Pharaoh".

== Career ==
Pérez began his career in 1931, after his brother, Carmelo Pérez, was gored during a bullfight in Mexico by a bull named "Michin" from the ganaderia San Diego de los Padres He died weeks later in Spain as a consequence of that wound.

== Death ==
Pérez died at his ranch in Pentecostes, east of Mexico City, of pneumonia.
