= Philip H. Melanson =

Philip H. Melanson

Philip H. Melanson (1944 – September 18, 2006) was a Chancellor Professor of Policy Studies at University of Massachusetts Dartmouth and served on the executive board of the university's Center for Policy Analysis (CFPA) now known as the Public Policy Center. He served as chair of the Political Science Department for 12 years.

He also served as coordinator of the Robert F. Kennedy Assassination Archive from April 1988, which is the world's largest collection on the subject. On 24 March 1995 he testified at a public hearing of the Assassination Records Review Board in Boston, Massachusetts.

An internationally recognized expert on political violence and governmental secrecy, Melanson wrote numerous books and articles related to these subjects. He was also member of the governing board of John Judge's Coalition on Political Assassinations. He appeared on BBC, CBS, CNN, C-SPAN, and NPR news programs.

In 2001 he was the University of Massachusetts, Dartmouth Faculty Federation Scholar of the Year.

He made numerous Freedom of Information Act (FOIA) requests, which resulted in the release of over 200,000 pages of federal government documents on topics relevant to his research.

The Philip H. Melanson Memorial Scholarship was established in 2006 by friends, colleagues, and former students of Dr. Melanson to provide financial assistance to graduate students who are enrolled at UMass Dartmouth and maintain an active interest in public policy.

== Publications ==
- Knowledge, Politics, and Public Policy (ed.). Cambridge, Mass.: Winthrop Publishers Inc. (1973).
- Political Science and Political Knowledge. Washington, D.C.: Public Affairs Press (1975).
- The Politics of Protection: The U.S. Secret Service in The Terrorist Age. New York: Praeger Publishers (1984).
- The MURKIN Conspiracy: An Inquiry into the Assassination of Dr. Martin Luther King, Jr. New York: Praeger Publishers (1988). ISBN 0275930297.
- Spy Saga: Lee Harvey Oswald and U.S. Intelligence. New York: Prager (1990). ISBN 027593571X.
- The Robert F. Kennedy Assassination: New Revelations on the Conspiracy and Coverup, 1968–1991. New York: Shapolsky Publishers (1991).
- The Assassination of Martin Luther King, Jr. New York: SPI Books (1991).
- Who Killed Martin Luther King? Berkeley, Calif.: Odonian Press (1991).
- Who Killed Robert Kennedy? Berkeley, Calif.: Odonian Press (1991).
- Shadow Play: The Killing of Robert Kennedy, The Trial of Sirhan Sirhan, and the Failure of American Justice, with William Klaber. New York: St. Martin's Press (1997). ISBN 0312153988.
- Secrecy Wars: Privacy, National Security and the Public's Right to Know. Dulles, Virg.: Brassey's (Jan. 2002). ISBN 1574883240.
- The Secret Service: The Hidden History of an Enigmatic Agency, with Peter Stevens. New York: Carroll & Graff (2002). ISBN 0786716177.
