= Gopal Rai (Nepalese politician) =

Nepali politician

- गोपाल राई
- Gopal Rai during his early political journey

Minister of State for Forest and Soil Conservation

Personal details
- Born: 1 May 1957 Okhaldhunga
- Died: 23 September 2006 (aged 49) Ghunsa, Taplejung
- Party: Nepali Congress
- Spouse: Mina Rai
- Children: 5 (1 son and 4 daughters)
- Education: Bachelor of Arts

Gopal Rai (Nepali: गोपाल राई ) was a political leader of the Nepali Congress. He was state minister for Forest and Soil Conservation of Nepal. He became active in politics while studying bachelor's degree in Tri Chandra College against Panchayat System. He was captured while planning to attack by force in Okhaldhunga. His many friends were killed and he was put in jail.

== Early life ==
Gopal Rai was born and raised in Okhaldhunga.

== Death ==
He died in a MI-17 chopper accident at Ghunsa, Taplejung in Nepal during World Wide Fund for Nature program with other 23 passengers including his wife Mina Rai on 23 September 2006.
