= Deforrest Most =

American gymnast (1936–2006)

Deforrest "Moe" Most (April 23, 1917 – September 2, 2006) was a gymnast and the unofficial "ambassador" of Muscle Beach.

== Biography ==
Most was born in Echo Park, Los Angeles, California. His parents named him after the inventor Lee De Forest.

=== Tahiti and Samoa ===
Inspired by what he had read in books about the South Seas, Most sailed to Tahiti in the early 1930s. He returned to California only because the steamship line on which he'd sailed was ending service to the island, and Most didn't want to lose the remaining fare on his round-trip ticket.

Most later succumbed to wanderlust again and traveled to the Samoan Islands, where he lived with the daughter of an island chieftain.

Most left the South Pacific a second time only because of the looming threat of World War II. He wasn't able to serve in the U.S. military because of an abnormality in his neck. Rather, he got a job on the bomber assembly line at the Douglas Aircraft Company.

=== Muscle Beach ===
Most, a fitness enthusiast, began frequenting Muscle Beach in 1934 while still a student at Belmont High School. After his return from Samoa, Most again began frequenting Muscle Beach.

In 1947 Most was named director of Muscle Beach. He was in charge of equipment and activities, including staging the Mr. and Miss Muscle Beach contests and arranging other quirky contests staged on the beach that involved feats of strength or gymnastic skills.

Most served as director until 1958, when the city of Santa Monica, California shut down Muscle Beach. The weightlifters who had frequented the Santa Monica shore moved south to Venice, California, and established a new Muscle Beach at the Venice Boardwalk.

"There was a lot of prejudice involved," Most said in a 1999 interview of Santa Monica's decision to close down Muscle Beach. "People didn't like weightlifters and thought there was something wrong with them. Athletes were not accepted like they are today."

Over four decades later, Santa Monica restored gymnastics equipment at the site and redubbed it "Muscle Beach."

== Feats of strength ==
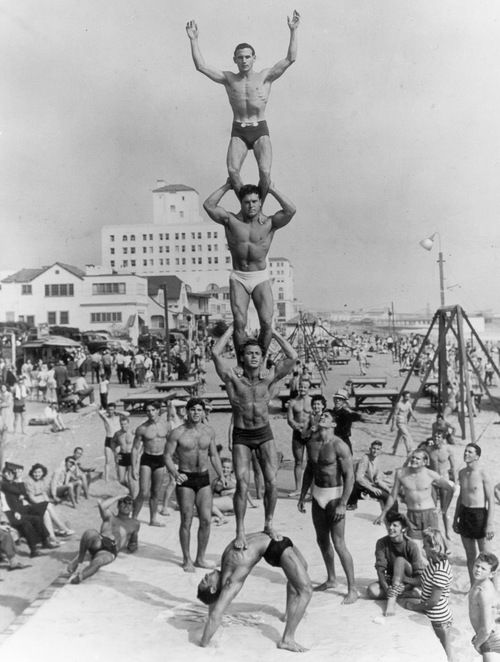
In ascending order: Harold Zinkin, Deforrest "Moe" Most, Jack LaLanne, Gene Miller.

Most's physical strength, combined with an unerring sense of balance, made him a champion "understander" — the bottom person in a human pyramid.

In his most memorable stunt, the four-man pyramid, Most balanced on the torso of Harold Zinkin, the bodybuilder who won the first Mr. California title. Future exercise guru Jack LaLanne stands on Most's shoulders, and Gene Miller balances on LaLanne.

"Moe was one of the greatest athletes I've ever known. We did tricks that nobody else had ever done," LaLanne told the Los Angeles Times.

Most once anchored a three-man tower on which Roy Rogers climbed on top and without removing his cowboy boots.

== Personal life ==
Most was married three times. His third wife, Jackie, died in 1999. Most had two sons, Michael and Steven; Michael died in 2000.

Deforrest Most died of heart failure at UCLA Medical Center in Santa Monica, aged 89.
