= Cornelius O'Leary =

Historian and political scientist

- Born: 30 September 1927; Limerick, Ireland
- Died: 7 September 2006 (aged 78)
- Resting place: Timoleague Abbey Cemetery, County Cork, Ireland
- Education: University College Cork; Nuffield College, Oxford
- Employer: Queen's University Belfast
- Known for: Political historian and political commentator

Cornelius O'Leary (30 September 1927 – 7 September 2006) was an Irish historian and political scientist.

O'Leary was born in Limerick but was raised in Cork, where he attended University College Cork, gaining a first-class honours degree in history and Latin in 1949. He subsequently studied for a DPhil at Nuffield College, Oxford as the first student to be supervised by the psephologist David Butler. While researching his PhD, he worked at a number of secondary schools in London.

His thesis was published as The Elimination of Corrupt Practices in British Elections, 1868-1911 (Clarendon Press, 1962) and in the same year he was appointed lecturer at Queen's University Belfast in Northern Ireland. He was made professor of political science in 1979, having been controversially denied such a post previously. He was the first Catholic to hold such a chair at the university and explained that, when he was appointed in 1960, he saw Queen's as part of the Unionist establishment. According to an obituary written by Bernard Crick, O'Leary suffered from alcoholism, which resulting in him often being absent from the university and colleagues having to cover for him. At one point he lived in hotels and lodging houses rather than at a fixed address.

Aside from his PhD thesis, O'Leary's main publications were Belfast: Approach to Crisis. A Study of Belfast Politics, 1613-1970 (with Ian Budge, Macmillan, 1973), The Northern Ireland Assembly, 1982-1986: A Constitutional Experiment (with Sydney Elliott and R.A. Wilford, Hurst, 1988) and Controversial Issues in Anglo-Irish Relations, 1910-1921 (with Patrick Maume, Four Courts, 2004). He had planned a work on 20th century Irish politics but this never materialised.

Although from the Republic of Ireland, O'Leary developed an interest in Unionism, and was an advisor to the Ulster Defence Association. He subsequently wrote a paper on Northern Irish independence at the request of John McMichael. During the 1960s and 1970s he was a regular commentator on Northern Ireland in the media. In his later life, he served as the vice-chairman of the anti-abortion campaign surrounding the Eighth Amendment of the Constitution of Ireland, which introduced a constitutional ban on abortion. This brought him into opposition with many feminists.

O'Leary died on 7 September 2006 after a short illness. He is buried at Timoleague Abbey Cemetery in County Cork.
