= Tommy Chesbro =

American wrestler and coach (1939–2006)

Personal information
- Born: October 28, 1939 Colorado City, Texas, U.S.
- Died: September 1, 2006 (aged 66) Stillwater, Oklahoma, U.S.

Professional wrestling career
- Retired: 2006 (when died)

Tommy Chesbro (October 28, 1939 – September 1, 2006) was an Oklahoma State University all-star wrestler and coach. In his 15 years as OSU’s coach, he earned a national reputation as a matchless technician, whose teams won 227 dual meets with only 26 defeats, a 90 per cent winning record. During those years, he coached 20 individual NCAA champions and 20 National AAU and USA Wrestling winners. In 1995, he was inducted into the National Wrestling Hall of Fame. He only won one national championship in Stillwater, in part because his tenure coincided with Iowa dominating the sport under Dan Gable.
