= Harka Gurung =

Nepali geographer, author, and politician (1939–2006)

- Thula
- Born: 5 January 1939; Taranche, Lamjung, Nepal
- Died: 23 September 2006 (aged 67); Phale, Taplejung, Nepal
- Education: Rashtriya Military School Chaill, University of Edinburgh, Patna University
- Known for: Geographer, Urban Planner

Dr. Harka Bahadur Gurung (1939–2006) was a Nepali geographer, author, and politician, known for his conservation work.

== Early life ==
Gurung was born in Lamjung on 5 February 1939, in the village of Taranche. His father was a non-commissioned officer in the British Army. After completing his secondary education at King George Royal Indian Military School(Rashtriya Military School Chail), he studied B.A. and M.A. in geography at Patna University, and later received a PhD from the University of Edinburgh in 1965 after being offered a scholarship there.

== Academic career ==
After completing his PhD, Gurung worked as a research fellow at the School of Oriental and African Studies in London, returning to Nepal in 1966 to take up a lecturing post at Tribhuvan University in Kathmandu. In 1984, he was appointed visiting fellow at the East–West Center in Hawaii. A prolific scholarly author, Gurung published fifteen books and around 675 academic articles and reports. He also worked as an advisor to the World Wildlife Fund in Nepal.

== Political career ==
In 1968, Gurung was appointed vice-chairman of Nepal's National Planning Commission. He subsequently held several government posts, including Minister of State for Education, Trade and Industry Minister, and Minister of State for Tourism. He served as Director of the Asia and Pacific Development Centre from 1993 to 1998, and was a consultant for the World Bank.

== Death ==
Gurung died in 2006 along with 23 others in a helicopter crash at Phale in Taplejung, whilst returning from a conservation meeting. The 2011 Kathmandu International Mountain Film Festival was dedicated to his memory, and Lamjung F.C. created a memorial football tournament in his honor. In Pokhara, a three-hectare eco-park (the Dr. Harka, Chandra & Migma Memorial Laligurans Eco Park) was set up to commemorate Gurung and those who died with him in the crash.
