= Chandra Gurung =

Nepalese ecologist

Chandra Prasad Gurung
- चन्द्र प्रसाद गुरुङ
- Children: 3 sons, 1 daughter

Chandra Gurung (died 23 September 2006), also Chandra Prasad Gurung, was a leader in conservation and sustainable field of Nepal. His major notable works include to make success of the Annapurna Conservation Area Project.

== Early life ==
He was born in Sikles, a remote village in Kaski District, Nepal.

== Death ==
He died on 23 September 2006 following the helicopter crash at Ghunsa, Taplejung, Nepal including 23 other conservationists. At that time, he was serving as the director of the World Wildlife Fund (WWF) for Nepal.

== Memorials ==
A community forest is dedicated to the memory of Dr. Chandra Gurung by the locals of Joshipur, Dhangadhi, Nepal, who were inspired by his work.
