= 2006 Shree Air Mil Mi-8 crash =

Helicopter accident in Nepal

Shree Air Mil Mi-8 Crash
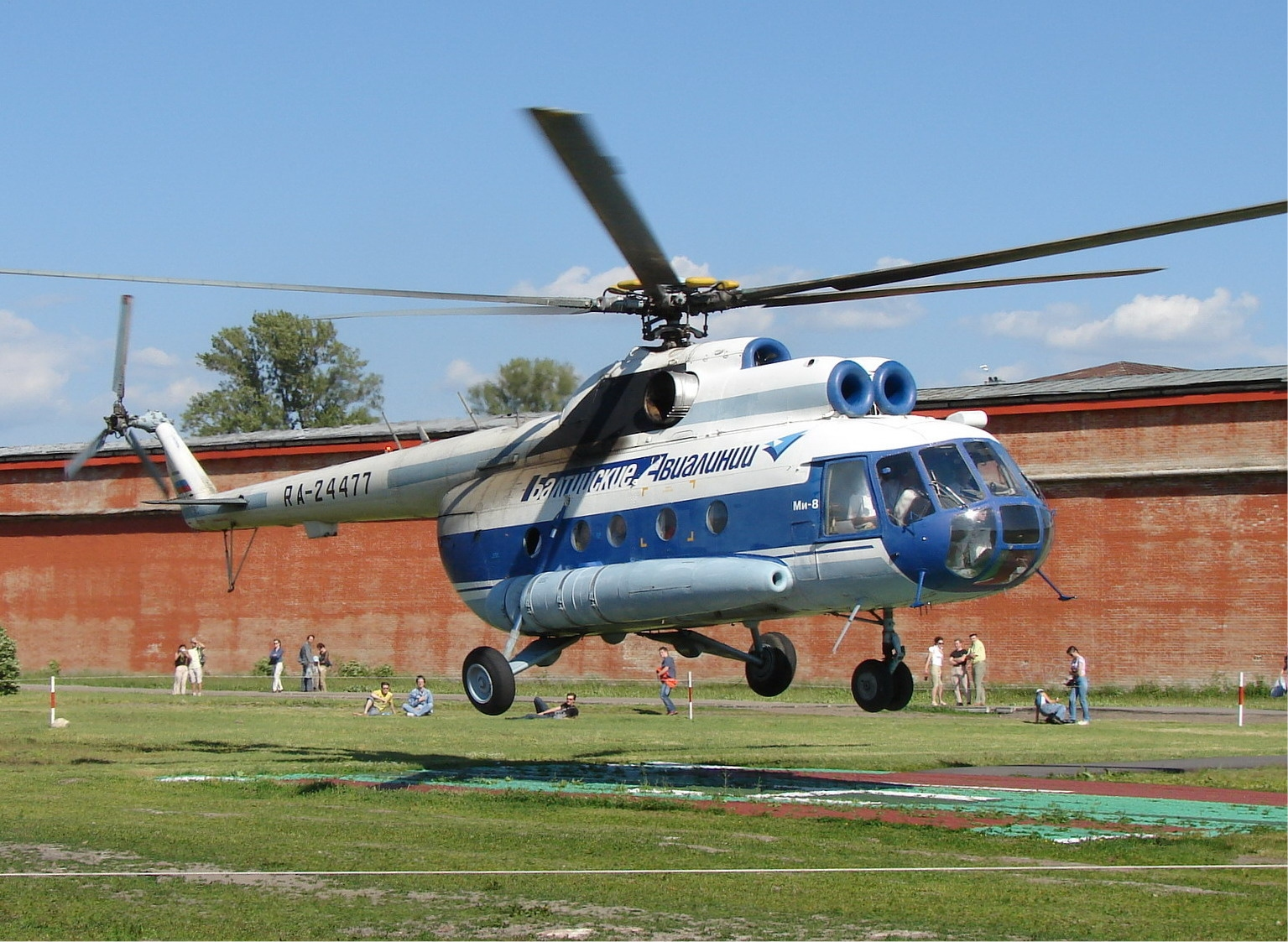
- A Mil Mi-8 helicopter, similar to the one involved in the accident

Accident
- Date: 23 September 2006
- Summary: Pilot error along with poor airline training
- Site: Ghunsa, Nepal

Aircraft
- Aircraft type: Mil Mi-8
- Operator: Shree Air
- Registration: 9N-AHJ
- Flight origin: Phungling, Nepal
- Destination: Ghunsa, Nepal
- Occupants: 24
- Passengers: 20
- Crew: 4
- Fatalities: 24
- Survivors: 0

On 23 September 2006, a Shree Air Mil Mi-8 helicopter crashed on a chartered flight from Phungling to Ghunsa in Eastern Nepal. The accident killed all 24 passengers and crew on board, including an expedition of World Wide Fund for Nature, in the process of the creation of the indigenously owned and managed Kangchenjunga Conservation Area.

== Aircraft ==
The helicopter involved in the accident was a Mil Mi-8 MTV 1.

== Crew and victims ==
On board the helicopter was an expedition of World Wide Fund for Nature returning from a conservation event in Taplejung District, where the Government of Nepal handed the management of the park around Kanchenjunga to the local people. The WWF team included Chandra Gurung and Harka Gurung. Other passengers on board the ill-fated helicopter included politician Gopal Rai.

Casualties by nationality
Country	Deaths (Crew)	Deaths (Passengers)
Nepal	2	14
Russia	2	0
UK	0	1
USA	0	2
Canada	0	1
Australia	0	1
Finland	0	1
Total	4	20

=== Casualties ===
- Dr. Bigyan Acharya, Program Development Specialist USAID, Nepal
- Margaret Alexander, Deputy Director, USAID, Nepal
- Hem Raj Bhandari, Reporter, Nepal Television
- Dr. Chandra Prasad Gurung, Country Representative, WWF Nepal
- Dr. Harka Gurung, Advisor, WWF Nepal
- Jennifer Headley, Coordinator, Himalaya/South Asia Program
- Klim Kim, Flight Crew
- Yeshi Choden Lama, Senior Program Officer, WWF Nepal
- Tirtha Man Maskey, Former Director General, Department of National Parks and Wildlife Conservation
- Pauli Mustonen, Charge d'Affaires, Embassy of Finland, Nepal
- Dr. Damodar Parajuli, Acting Secretary, Ministry of Forests and Soil Conservation
- Matthew Preece, Program Officer, Eastern Himalayas Program, WWF US (Recently hired by USAID)
- Narayan Poudel, Director General, Department of National Parks and Wildlife Conservation
- The Honorable Gopal Rai Minister of State, Ministry of Forests and Soil Conservation, and his wife, Meena Rai
- Sharad Rai, Director General, Department of Forests
- Dr. Jillian Bowling Schlaepfer, Director of Conservation, WWF UK
- Mingma Sherpa, Flight Crew
- Mingma Norbu Sherpa, Managing Director, Eastern Himalayas Program, WWF US
- Vijaya Shrestha, Central Committee Member, Federation of Nepalese Chamber of Commerce and Industry
- Sunil Singh, Cameraman, Nepal Television
- Valery Slafronov, Flight Crew
- Guruwar Tandul, Flight Crew
- Dr. Dawa Tshering, Chairperson, Kangchenjunga Conservation Area Management Council

== Incident ==
The helicopter took off at 10:45 NPT on 23 September 2006. Shortly afterwards, the helicopter was declared missing. Two days later, the wreckage of the helicopter was found south-west of Ghunsa. Bad weather was assumed to have caused the crash at the beginning.

== Investigation ==
The final report on the accident the committee of the Civil Aviation Authority of Nepal stated that the pilots entering cloudy areas in unfamiliar terrain as well as bad crew resource management were the main causes of the accident. It furthermore criticized the operating airline, Shree Air, on its training procedures.

== Aftermath ==
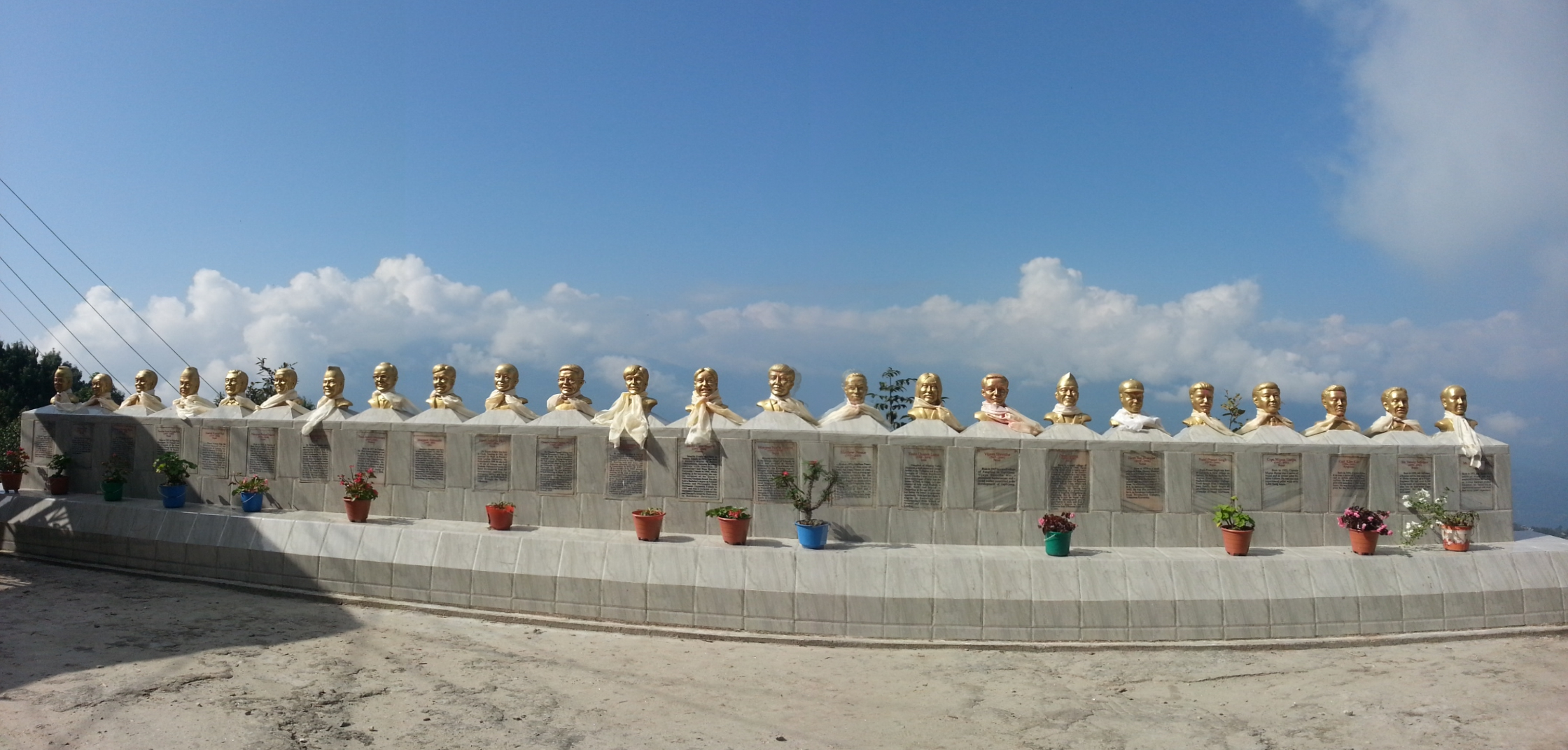
The memorial to the victims in Taplejung.

A day of mourning was observed throughout Nepal and schools and public offices were closed on 27 September 2006.
