= Guy François (colonel) =

Haitian military officer

- Died: September 14, 2006
- Spouse: Marie Alice
- Relatives: Sabine Carre
- Military career
- Allegiance: Haitian
- Branch: Army
- Rank: Colonel
- Commands: Dessalines Battalion

Guy André François was a colonel of the armed forces of Haiti. At the height of his military career François commanded the elite Dessalines Battalion.

François was accused twice of conspiring to overthrow the government of Haiti, in 1989 and in 2001. After the 1989 accusation, François fled to Venezuela, but would eventually be allowed to return to Haiti. He was arrested, convicted and spent two years in prison for his involvement in the 2001 coup attempt on the government of then president Jean-Bertrand Aristide.

On September 14, 2006 Guy François' body was discovered in his car in Pétion-Ville, the wealthy suburb of Port-au-Prince in which he lived.

François was married to Marie Alice and a daughter, Sabine Carre. Guy François' brother is Dr. M. Rony François, who is the health secretary for Florida.
