= Paulo Marques (journalist) =

Brazilian journalist and broadcaster

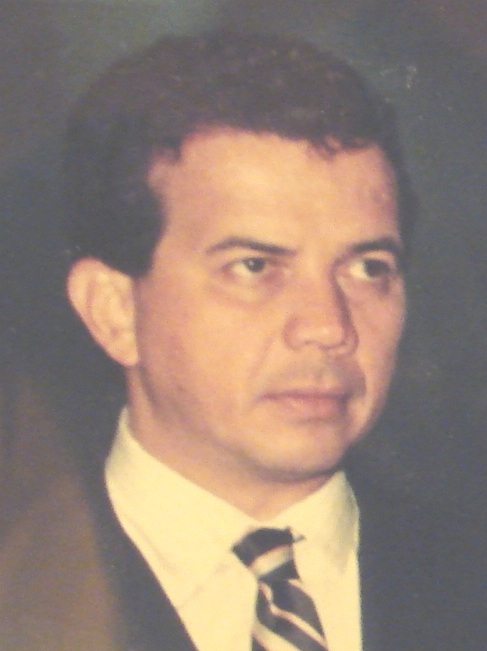
- Paulo Marques in 1987

Personal details
- Born: June 29, 1948 Carpina, Brazil
- Died: September 14, 2006 (aged 58) Recife, Brazil

Paulo Marques (June 29, 1948 - September 14, 2006) was a Brazilian journalist and broadcaster. Paulo was also a politician, having been elected to the city council of Carpina, Pernambuco, Brazil and to the state and federal legislatures. He was divorced, lived with a companion and had three children: Allana Marques, from the first marriage and two with his last companion, João Paulo Holanda e Paulo Marques Filho. He died from a brain tumor after having been hospitalized in the São José Memorial Hospital in Recife for three months.
