= Eduard Butenko =

Russian theatre director (1941–2006)

- Born: Eduard Valentinovich Butenko; February 17, 1941; Village Khorol', Primorsky Krai, Soviet Union
- Died: September 2, 2006 (aged 65); Moscow, Russia
- Occupations: theatre director, actor, theoretic, teacher
- Years active: 1959 - 2006

Eduard Butenko (Russian: Эдуард Валентинович Бутенко, February 17, 1941 – September 2, 2006) - Russian actor, theatre director, teacher, theatre theoretic.

== Biography ==
On 1959 Eduard Butenko began his theatre career as an actor in "Kiev Russian Drama Theatre" when he was 18.

After graduating from the University of Shevchenko (1966) with a BA in Philology/Slavic Languages and the National University of Theatre, Film and TV in Kiev (1971) with a BA in Drama Theatre Stage Directing, Butenko has directed over 70 drama performances, musicals, various show programs, TV and radio plays.

Since 1987 E. Butenko lectured in Russian Academy of Theatre Arts (on variety department) and in "Boris Shchukin Theatre Institute".

On 2004 Butenko created "Russian Drama School" where he taught his own system. Butenko is the author of stage transformation theory, stated and published in the books "Imitation Theory of Stage Transformation" (2004) and "Stage Transformation, Theory and Practice" (2005).

== Stage productions as theatre director ==
=== Dnipropetrovsk Russian Drama Theatre ===
- 1971 – diploma spectacle (National University of Theatre, Film and TV in Kiev)

=== Ryazan Oblast Drama Theatre ===
- 1980 "Pelageya i Al'ka" «Russian: Пелагея и Алька» (Author: Abramov)
- 1981 "The Barber of Seville" (Author: Pierre Beaumarchais)
- 1982 "Monsieur Amilcar"

=== Altai Krai Drama Theatre ===
- 1984 "Vagonchik" «Russian: Вагончик» (Author: Pavlova)

=== Moscow Variety Theatre ===
- 1987 "Thee questions" (Author: V. Koklushkin)
- 1988 "Kruglaya luna" «Russian: Круглая луна» (Author: V. Koklushkin)

=== Mossovet Theatre (Moscow) ===
- 1993 "Francesco d'Assisi " Opera teatrale in 3 atti (author: Jean-Marie Benjamin).

=== University of Pittsburgh Theatre (U.S.A) ===
- 2005 – "Pericles, Prince of Tyre" (W. Shakespeare)

== Bibliography ==
- Butenko, Eduard (2004). (Russian: Имитационная теория сценического перевоплощения) "The Imitation Theory Of Actor's Transformation" ISBN 5-901507-06-1
- Butenko, Eduard (2005). (Russian: Сценическое перевоплощение. Теория и практика) "Stage Transformation, Theory and Practice"
- Butenko, Eduard (2004). "The Imitation Theory Of Actor's Transformation"
