= Ghunsa =

Ghunsa དགུན་ས་
- Village
- घुन्सा
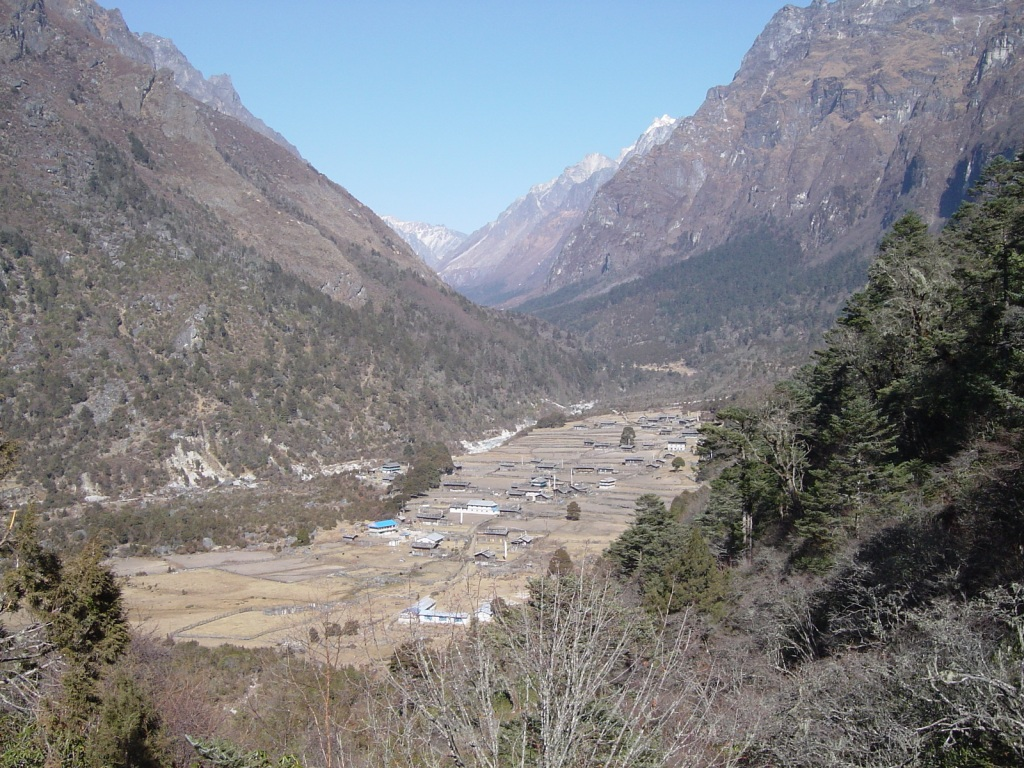
- Ghunsa village

- Location of Ghunsa Village in Nepal
- Coordinates: 27°39′40″N 87°56′10″E
- Country: Nepal
- Development Region: Eastern
- Zone: Mechi Zone
- District: Taplejung District

Government
  - Type: VDC
- Time zone: UTC+5:45 (Nepal Time)
- Post code: 32907

Ghunsa (transl. "winter place") is a village of Taplejung, Nepal at an elevation of 3,475 m and is a major check point for Mt. Kangchenjunga. This village came into attention after the helicopter accident that killed 24 passengers including most prominent figures in conservation work.

== Inhabitants ==
The locals called themselves Gunsa(wa)pa. They can be classified under larger Walung-ngas tribe.

The local language spoken by Gunsawa is Ghunsake, a variation of Walungge family, of Central Tibetan language.

Most inhabitants involve themselves in subsistence farming and yak grazing. The main crops grown are maize and potatoes. Until recently, many households were semi-nomadic in their quest for capital, with the exception of a few trading families. But thanks to the opening of the Kangchendzonga circuit, more young people are now employed in the tourism sector.

== Access ==
Ghunsa can be accessed from Taplejung in three days walk along the bank of Tamur River. The trail passes by numerous waterfalls and rivulets making it popular among the trekkers all around the world.

== Facilities ==
- Hotels: There are few hotels that serves for the tourist and local travelers.
- Health post: There is one health post in this village
- Education: The Ghunsa community is currently served by a six-government-staffed school that was built with the support of a group of climbers from San Francisco.
- Microhydro: A 35 kw microhydro has been constructed and is under operation. Water from Ghunsa river is used to run the turbines of this plant. The energy has served to reduce local deforestation and also helped to flourish tourism in neighboring village.
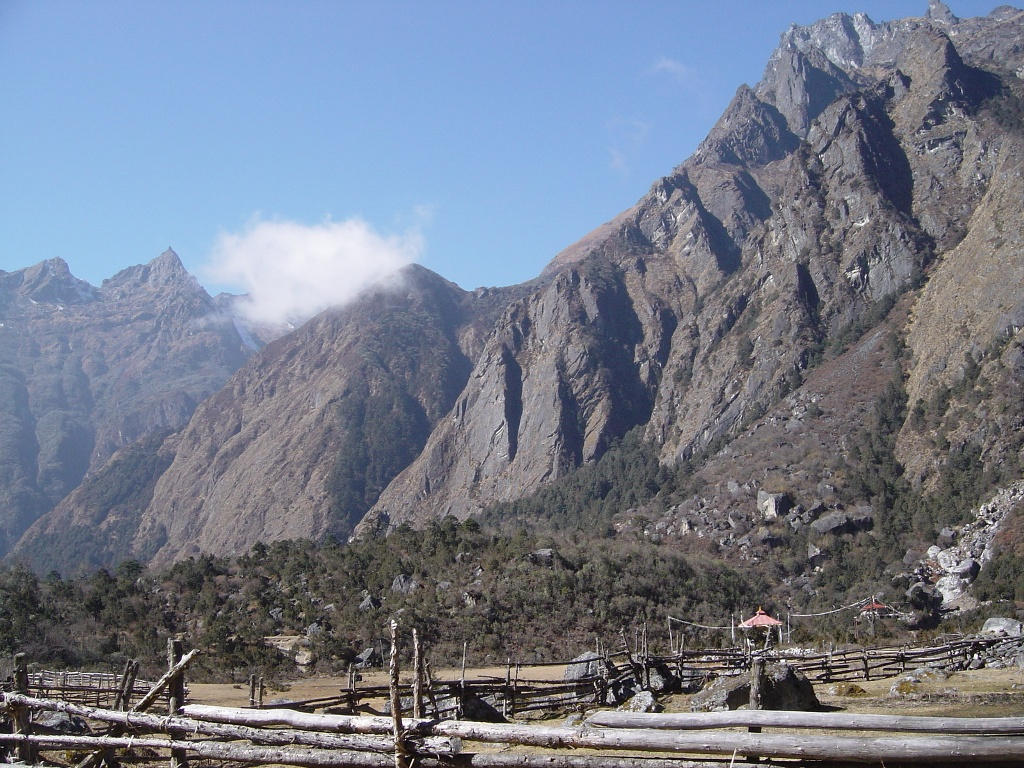
View from Gunsa village
