= 2006 in film =

The following is an overview of events in 2006, including the highest-grossing films, award ceremonies and festivals, a list of films released and notable deaths. Pirates of the Caribbean: Dead Man's Chest was the year's highest grossing film, while The Departed won the Academy Award for Best Picture (out of four awards).

== Evaluation of the year ==
Philip French of The Guardian described 2006 as "an outstanding year for British cinema". He went on to emphasize:

Six of our well-established directors have made highly individual films of real distinction: Michael Winterbottom's A Cock and Bull Story, Ken Loach's Palme d'Or winner The Wind That Shakes the Barley, Christopher Nolan's The Prestige, Stephen Frears's The Queen, Paul Greengrass's United 93 and Nicholas Hytner's The History Boys. Two young directors made confident debuts, both offering a jaundiced view of contemporary Britain: Andrea Arnold's Red Road and Paul Andrew Williams's London to Brighton. In addition the gifted Mexican Alfonso Cuaron came here to make the dystopian thriller Children of Men.

He also stated,

In the (United) States, M. Night Shyamalan of The Sixth Sense fame fell flat on his over-confident face with Lady in the Water, but Martin Scorsese's The Departed was his best for years, and he was with Jack Nicholson at last. Apart from that, the best American films were political (Syriana, Good Night, and Good Luck, The New World) or very personal (Little Miss Sunshine, Little Children, The Squid and the Whale). Sadly, Oliver Stone's 9/11 picture World Trade Center was neither. Asian cinema produced a string of elegant thrillers and horror flicks. The best Eastern European movie was The Death of Mr. Lazarescu, a devastating look at the Romania Ceausescu left behind him. Most of the best Western European films came from France, with Michael Haneke's Caché, proving the most widely discussed art-house puzzle picture since Last Year at Marienbad. The award of 18 certificates by the BBFC to Shortbus and Destricted has brought close the abolition of censorship, but not of classification, and Ang Lee's Brokeback Mountain was a real step forward for the representation of homosexuals in mainstream cinema, though Gore Vidal claims that there's a gay subtext to every western. However, the year's most extraordinary event, or conjunction, was the almost simultaneous release of Tommy Lee Jones's directorial debut The Three Burials of Melquiades Estrada and Al Gore's documentary An Inconvenient Truth. Who would have predicted in the Sixties, when they were roommates at Harvard and used by Erich Segal as joint models for Oliver Barrett IV in Love Story, that both Jones and Gore would end up as movie stars - if, in Gore's case, accidentally and temporarily?

== Highest-grossing films ==
The top 10 films released in 2006 by worldwide gross are as follows:

Highest-grossing films of 2006
Rank	Title	Distributor(s)	Worldwide gross
1	Pirates of the Caribbean: Dead Man's Chest	Buena Vista	$1,066,179,725
2	The Da Vinci Code	Sony	$760,006,945
3	Ice Age: The Meltdown	20th Century Fox	$660,998,756
4	Casino Royale	Sony / MGM	$606,099,584
5	Night at the Museum	20th Century Fox	$574,480,841
6	Cars	Buena Vista	$484,830,578
7	X-Men: The Last Stand	20th Century Fox	$460,435,291
8	Mission: Impossible III	Paramount	$398,479,497
9	Superman Returns	Warner Bros.	$391,081,192
10	Happy Feet	Warner Bros.	$384,335,608

=== Box office records ===
- Sony Pictures grossed more than $3 billion in annual worldwide box office revenue for the first time in its history.
- Pirates of the Caribbean: Dead Man's Chest became the third film in cinema history to gross over $1 billion and is the 43rd highest-grossing film of all time.

== Events ==
Month
Day
Event
January
4
The Producers Guild of America nominates Brokeback Mountain, Capote, Crash, Good Night, and Good Luck and Walk the Line as contenders for their best-produced film award. The Writers Guild of America (WGA) nominate The 40-Year-Old Virgin, I Tried, Crash, Good Night, and Good Luck and The Squid and the Whale for best original screenplay. The WGA nominees for best adapted screenplay are Brokeback Mountain, Capote, The Constant Gardener, A History of Violence and Syriana.
5
Jon Stewart is named host of the 78th Academy Awards.
9
The Critics Choice Association present their Critics' Choice Awards for the best films of 2005 live on The WB network in the United States. Brokeback Mountain is named best picture, best director for Ang Lee and ties for best supporting actress for Michelle Williams. Philip Seymour Hoffman is named best actor for Capote and Reese Witherspoon is awarded best actress for Walk the Line.
16
The winners of the 63rd Golden Globe Awards include Brokeback Mountain for best dramatic picture and best director.
19
The 2006 Sundance Film Festival starts in Park City, Utah.
24
Disney announces plans to acquire Pixar.
28
The Directors Guild of America names Ang Lee best film director of 2005 for Brokeback Mountain, best documentary goes to Werner Herzog for Grizzly Man and its Lifetime Achievement Award goes to Clint Eastwood.
29
The Screen Actors Guild names Philip Seymour Hoffman outstanding male movie actor for Capote, Reese Witherspoon as outstanding female lead movie actor for Walk the Line, Rachel Weisz as outstanding female actor in a supporting role for The Constant Gardener, Paul Giamatti as outstanding male actor in a supporting role for Cinderella Man, the cast of Crash as outstanding ensemble in a theatrical motion picture, and Shirley Temple Black is given a life achievement award.
30
The 26th Golden Raspberry Awards nominees include Deuce Bigalow: European Gigolo, Dirty Love, The Dukes of Hazzard, House of Wax and Son of the Mask for worst film; Tom Cruise, Will Ferrell, Jamie Kennedy, The Rock and Rob Schneider for worst actor; and Jessica Alba, Hilary Duff, Jennifer Lopez, Jenny McCarthy and Tara Reid for worst actress.
31
The Academy Awards for best film achievement in 2005 had nominated primarily independent films. Brokeback Mountain led the nominations with 8, followed by Crash, Good Night, and Good Luck and Memoirs of a Geisha all earning six.
February
5
The 33rd annual Annie Award - Wallace and Gromit: The Curse of the Were-Rabbit won the best animated feature, as well as all nine categories which it was nominated. Family Guy won the best voice acting and directing, Star Wars: Clone Wars II Chapters 21-25 won the best animated TV production, Lilo & Stitch 2: Stitch Has a Glitch won the best home entertainment award, and Ultimate Spider-Man won the new "best video game award".
6
Disney re-acquires the rights to Oswald the Lucky Rabbit from NBCUniversal, in exchange for ABC letting commentator Al Michaels work on NBC Sunday Night Football.
March
4
Dirty Love dominates the 26th Golden Raspberry Awards with 4 awards including Worst Picture and Worst Actress for Jenny McCarthy. Rob Schneider took home for Worst Actor for his performance in Deuce Bigalow: European Gigolo. Other awards went to Hayden Christensen as Worst Supporting Actor for Star Wars: Episode III – Revenge of the Sith and Paris Hilton as Worst Supporting Actress for House of Wax
5
78th Academy Awards: Crash earns a win for Best Picture upsetting favorite Brokeback Mountain. No film, for the first time in 58 years, won a clear majority. Both films as well as Memoirs of a Geisha and King Kong win three Oscars each. Favorite March of the Penguins wins Oscar for Documentary Feature. South Africa wins its first motion picture Oscar with the Best Foreign Film award for Tsotsi. Wallace & Gromit: The Curse of the Were-Rabbit wins Oscar for Animated feature film.

Major awards as follows:

- Director: Ang Lee for Brokeback Mountain
- Actor: Philip Seymour Hoffman for Capote
- Actress: Reese Witherspoon for Walk the Line
- Supporting Actor: George Clooney for Syriana
- Supporting Actress: Rachel Weisz for The Constant Gardener
13
11th Empire Awards: Pride & Prejudice and Star Wars: Episode III – Revenge of the Sith win the most awards with two.
April
18
Tom Cruise and fiancée Katie Holmes welcomed their newborn baby Suri.
25
The 5th annual Tribeca Film Festival opens with notable films such as Mission: Impossible III and United 93.
28
TV double act Ant & Dec make their big screen debut with Alien Autopsy.
May
17
The 2006 Cannes Film Festival began in Cannes, France. It continued until May 28. It was hosted by Vincent Cassel. Films in competition included Babel by Alejandro González Iñárritu, Fast Food Nation by Richard Linklater, Iklimler by Nuri Bilge Ceylan, El Laberinto del Fauno by Guillermo del Toro, Marie Antoinette by Sofia Coppola, Southland Tales by Richard Kelly, Volver by Pedro Almodóvar, and The Wind That Shakes the Barley by Ken Loach
27
Brad Pitt and Oscar-winner Angelina Jolie give birth to daughter Shiloh in the African nation of Namibia.
June
3
The 2006 MTV Movie Awards winners were announced.
14
The American Film Institute releases its ninth list of its AFI 100 Years... series, AFI's 100 Years...100 Cheers recognizing 100 films as the most "inspirational" in cinema history. Frank Capra's It's a Wonderful Life is named the most "inspirational" film of all time.
July
7
Pirates of the Caribbean: Dead Man's Chest opens later grossing $55.8 million on its opening day, setting records for the largest opening day, the largest single day gross, and the largest Friday gross of all time (the previous record was held by Star Wars: Episode III – Revenge of the Sith with $50,013,859, the previous year). It also surpassed the opening weekend gross (at $135,634,554 between July 7–9) previously set by Spider-Man in 2002 with $114,844,116 between May 3–5.
28
Actor and Oscar-winning director producer Mel Gibson is arrested after speeding on Pacific Coast Highway due to a DUI. Police reports later reveal stinging anti-Semitic comments made to the officer (a Jew). Gibson checked into rehab and issued several statements apologizing for his rude comments. See Mel Gibson DUI incident for more details.
September
7
Ellen DeGeneres is named host of the 79th Academy Awards.
7-16
The 2006 Toronto International Film Festival takes place.
December
7
64th Golden Globe Awards nominees are announced. Babel leads nominations with seven.

== Awards ==
Category/Organization	64th Golden Globe Awards January 15, 2007		12th Critics' Choice Awards January 14, 2007	Producers, Directors, Screen Actors, and Writers Guild Awards January 20-February 11, 2007	60th BAFTA Awards February 11, 2007	79th Academy Awards February 25, 2007
Category/Organization	Drama	Musical or Comedy	12th Critics' Choice Awards January 14, 2007	Producers, Directors, Screen Actors, and Writers Guild Awards January 20-February 11, 2007	60th BAFTA Awards February 11, 2007	79th Academy Awards February 25, 2007
Best Film	Babel	Dreamgirls	The Departed	Little Miss Sunshine	The Queen	The Departed
Best Director	Martin Scorsese; The Departed				Paul Greengrass; United 93	Martin Scorsese; The Departed
Best Actor	Forest Whitaker; The Last King of Scotland	Sacha Baron Cohen; Borat	Forest Whitaker; The Last King of Scotland			
Best Actress	Helen Mirren; The Queen	Meryl Streep; The Devil Wears Prada	Helen Mirren; The Queen			
Best Supporting Actor	Eddie Murphy; Dreamgirls				Alan Arkin; Little Miss Sunshine	
Best Supporting Actress	Jennifer Hudson; Dreamgirls					
Best Screenplay, Adapted	Peter Morgan; The Queen		Michael Arndt; Little Miss Sunshine	William Monahan; The Departed	Jeremy Brock and Peter Morgan; The Last King of Scotland	William Monahan; The Departed
Best Screenplay, Original	Peter Morgan; The Queen		Michael Arndt; Little Miss Sunshine	Michael Arndt; Little Miss Sunshine		
Best Animated Film	Cars				Happy Feet	
Best Original Score	The Painted Veil; Alexandre Desplat		The Illusionist; Philip Glass	—N/a	Babel; Gustavo Santaolalla	
Best Original Song	"The Song of the Heart"; Happy Feet		"Listen"; Dreamgirls	—N/a	—N/a	"I Need to Wake Up"; An Inconvenient Truth
Best Foreign Language Film	Letters from Iwo Jima			—N/a	Pan's Labyrinth	The Lives of Others
Best Documentary	—N/a	—N/a	An Inconvenient Truth	—N/a	—N/a	An Inconvenient Truth

Palme d'Or (59th Cannes Film Festival):

The Wind That Shakes the Barley, directed by Ken Loach, United Kingdom

Golden Lion (63rd Venice International Film Festival):

Still Life (三峡好人), directed by Jia Zhangke, China

Golden Bear (56th Berlin International Film Festival):

Grbavica, directed by Jasmila Žbanić, Bosnia and Herzegovina

== 2006 films ==
=== By country/region ===
- List of American films of 2006
- List of Argentine films of 2006
- List of Australian films of 2006
- List of Bangladeshi films of 2006
- List of Bengali films of 2006
- List of Bollywood films of 2006
- List of Brazilian films of 2006
- List of British films of 2006
- List of Canadian films of 2006
- List of Chinese films of 2006
- List of French films of 2006
- List of Hindi films of 2006
- List of Hong Kong films of 2006
- List of Italian films of 2006
- List of Japanese films of 2006
- List of Kannada films of 2006
- List of Malayalam films of 2006
- List of Mexican films of 2006
- List of Pakistani films of 2006
- List of Russian films of 2006
- List of South Korean films of 2006
- List of Spanish films of 2006
- List of Tamil films of 2006
- List of Telugu films of 2006

=== By genre/medium ===
- List of action films of 2006
- List of animated feature films of 2006
- List of avant-garde films of 2006
- List of crime films of 2006
- List of comedy films of 2006
- List of drama films of 2006
- List of horror films of 2006
- List of science fiction films of 2006
- List of thriller films of 2006 5 6 2006

== Births ==
- March 1 - Julian Grey, American actor
- April 20 - Kailia Posey, American actress and reality television show contestant (died 2022)
- April 22 - Nathanael Saleh, English actor
- April 28 - Kiawentiio, Canadian-American actress
- April 29 - Xochitl Gomez, American actress
- May 6
  - Sadie Sandler, American actress
  - Aryan Simhadri, American actor
- May 22 - Mattea Conforti, American actress
- June 18 - Iris Barbosa, Brazilian YouTuber, singer and actress
- June 25 – Mckenna Grace, American actress
- June 28 - Laurel Griggs, American actress (died 2019)
- June 29 - Sam Lavagnino, American voice actor and YouTuber
- July 8 – Isabella Sermon, English actress
- July 12 – Kevin Vechiatto, Brazilian actor
- July 19 - Beau Gadsdon, British actress
- August 5 - Elle McKinnon, Canadian actress
- September 7 - Ian Chen, American actor
- September 12
  - Alexander Molony, British actor
  - Zackary Arthur, American actor
- September 17 - Ella Jay Basco, American actress
- October 1 - Priah Ferguson, American actress
- October 5 – Jacob Tremblay, Canadian actor
- October 30 - Saniyya Sidney, American actress
- November 16 - Sophia Hammons, American actress
- December 6 - Millie Davis, Canadian actress
- December 9 - Pixie Davies, English actress
- December 18 - Malia Baker, Canadian actress

== Deaths ==
Month	Date	Name	Age	Country	Profession	Notable films
January	2	Osa Massen	91	Denmark	Actress	A Woman's Face; Rocketship X-M
January	2	John Woodnutt	81	UK	Actor	Who Dares Wins; Lifeforce
January	5	Mark Roberts	84	US	Actor	Gilda; Shadowed
January	7	Jim Zulevic	40	US	Actor	Let's Go to Prison; Matchstick Men
January	12	Stu Linder	74	US	Film Editor	Rain Man; Good Morning, Vietnam
January	12	Norris Spencer	62	UK	Production Designer	Thelma & Louise; National Treasure
January	14	Shelley Winters	85	US	Actress	The Diary of Anne Frank; Lolita
January	19	Anthony Franciosa	77	US	Actor	A Hatful of Rain; A Face in the Crowd
January	21	Robert Knudson	80	US	Sound Engineer	E.T. the Extra-Terrestrial; The Exorcist
January	23	Joseph M. Newman	96	US	Director	This Island Earth; 711 Ocean Drive
January	24	Fayard Nicholas	91	US	Actor, Dancer, Choreographer	Stormy Weather; The Pirate
January	24	Chris Penn	40	US	Actor	Reservoir Dogs; Footloose
January	25	Moss Mabry	87	US	Costume Designer	The Way We Were; Giant
January	27	Paul Valentine	86	US	Actor	Out of the Past; House of Strangers
January	28	Henry McGee	77	UK	Actor	The Italian Job; Revenge of the Pink Panther
January	31	Moira Shearer	80	UK	Actress, Dancer	Peeping Tom; The Red Shoes
February	1	Roy Alon	63	UK	Stuntman	Indiana Jones and the Temple of Doom; Entrapment
February	3	Walerian Borowczyk	82	Poland	Director, Screenwriter	Goto, Island of Love; La Bête
February	3	Jean Byron	80	US	Actress	Flareup; The Magnetic Monster
February	3	Al Lewis	82	US	Actor	Used Cars; Married to the Mob
February	5	Franklin Cover	77	US	Actor	Wall Street; Almost Heroes
February	6	Pedro Gonzalez Gonzalez	80	US	Actor	The High and the Mighty; Rio Bravo
February	8	Akira Ifukube	91	Japan	Composer	Godzilla; The Burmese Harp
February	9	Phil Brown	89	US	Actor	Star Wars; Superman
February	13	Andreas Katsulas	59	US	Actor	The Fugitive; Executive Decision
February	14	Darry Cowl	80	France	Actor	Not on the Lips; Don't Touch the White Woman!
February	18	Richard Bright	64	US	Actor	The Godfather; Once Upon a Time in America
February	19	Erna Lazarus	102	US	Screenwriter	The Body Disappears; Hollywood or Bust
February	21	Richard Snell	50	US	Makeup Artist	Demolition Man; How the Grinch Stole Christmas
February	24	Don Knotts	81	US	Actor	The Incredible Mr. Limpet; The Reluctant Astronaut
February	24	Dennis Weaver	81	US	Actor	Touch of Evil; Duel at Diablo
February	25	Darren McGavin	83	US	Actor	The Man with the Golden Arm; A Christmas Story
March	1	Peter Sykes	66	Australia	Director	To the Devil a Daughter; Jesus
March	1	Jack Wild	53	UK	Actor	Oliver!; Robin Hood: Prince of Thieves
March	2	Phyllis Huffman	61	US	Casting Director	Million Dollar Baby; Unforgiven
March	7	John Junkin	76	UK	Actor	A Hard Day's Night; The Football Factory
March	7	Gordon Parks	93	US	Director	Shaft; The Learning Tree
March	8	Rhoda Williams	75	US	Actress	Cinderella; The Persuader
March	12	Joseph Bova	81	US	Actor	Serpico; Pretty Poison
March	13	Maureen Stapleton	80	US	Actress	Reds; Cocoon
March	16	Moira Redmond	77	UK	Actress	A Shot in the Dark; Nightmare
March	17	Bob Papenbrook	50	US	Voice Actor	Stranger than Fiction; Jeepers Creepers 2
March	18	Michael Attwell	63	UK	Actor	Labyrinth; High Heels and Low Lifes
March	25	Richard Fleischer	89	US	Director	20,000 Leagues Under the Sea; Tora! Tora! Tora!
March	29	Henry Farrell	85	US	Screenwriter	Hush...Hush, Sweet Charlotte; What's the Matter with Helen?
March	29	Gretchen Rau	66	US	Set Decorator, Art Director	Memoirs of a Geisha; The Last Samurai
March	31	Candice Rialson	54	US	Actress	Hollywood Boulevard; Summer School Teachers
April	4	Gary Gray	69	US	Actor	Rachel and the Stranger; Wild Heritage
April	9	Vilgot Sjöman	82	Sweden	Director	I Am Curious (Yellow); My Sister, My Love
April	13	Jacques Maumont	81	France	Sound Engineer	The Longest Day; Breathless
April	17	Henderson Forsythe	88	US	Actor	Silkwood; Species II
April	22	Alida Valli	84	Italy	Actress	The Third Man; Suspiria
April	23	Susan Browning	65	US	Actress	Sister Act; The Money Pit
April	23	Jennifer Jayne	74	UK	Actress, Screenwriter	The Medusa Touch; Dr. Terror's House of Horrors
April	29	Alberta Nelson	68	US	Actress	Beach Blanket Bingo; Dr. Goldfoot and the Bikini Machine
May	1	Jay Presson Allen	84	US	Screenwriter	Cabaret; Marnie
May	1	Betsy Jones-Moreland	76	US	Actress	Last Woman on Earth; Creature from the Haunted Sea
May	4	Michael Taliferro	44	US	Actor	The Replacements; Bad Boys
May	7	Tanis Chandler	81	France	Actress	Shadows Over Chinatown; Lured
May	10	Val Guest	94	UK	Director, Screenwriter	Casino Royale; The Day the Earth Caught Fire
May	14	Paul Marco	78	US	Actor	Plan 9 from Outer Space; Hiawatha
May	21	Katherine Dunham	96	US	Dancer	Stormy Weather; Casbah
May	24	Henry Bumstead	91	US	Art Director, Production Designer	To Kill a Mockingbird; Vertigo
May	27	Barbara Cohen	53	US	Casting Director	Rushmore; I Am Sam
May	27	Paul Gleason	67	US	Actor	The Breakfast Club; Die Hard
May	29	Katarína Kolníková	85	Slovakia	Actress	Vášnivý bozk
May	30	Shōhei Imamura	79	Japan	Director, Screenwriter	Endless Desire; The Insect Woman
May	30	Robert Sterling	88	US	Actor	Voyage to the Bottom of the Sea; Show Boat
June	8	Robert Donner	75	US	Actor	Cool Hand Luke; El Dorado
June	10	Gerald James	88	UK	Actor	The Man with the Golden Gun; Hope and Glory
June	12	Hugh Latimer	75	UK	Actor	The Million Pound Note; Jane Eyre
June	10	Monty Berman	92	UK	Producer, Director, Cinematographer	Jack the Ripper; What a Carve Up!
June	16	Arthur Franz	86	US	Actor	Invaders from Mars; Sands of Iwo Jima
June	18	Vincent Sherman	99	US	Director	The Young Philadelphians; Mr. Skeffington
June	18	Richard Stahl	74	US	Actor	Private School; Ghosts of Mississippi
June	23	Aaron Spelling	83	US	Producer, Actor	Mr. Mom; Soapdish
June	25	Kenneth Griffith	84	UK	Actor	Four Weddings and a Funeral; Sky Riders
July	2	Jan Murray	89	US	Actor	Which Way to the Front?; The Busy Body
July	3	Jack Smith	92	US	Actor	On Moonlight Bay; Cannonball Run II
July	5	Amzie Strickland	87	US	Actress	Pretty Woman; Shiloh
July	6	Kasey Rogers	80	US	Actress	Strangers on a Train; Two Lost Worlds
July	8	June Allyson	88	US	Actress	The Glenn Miller Story; The Three Musketeers
July	9	Chris Drake	82	US	Actor	Them!; A Walk in the Sun
July	11	Barnard Hughes	90	US	Actor	Tron; Midnight Cowboy
July	12	Kurt Kreuger	89	Germany	Actor	Sahara; The Enemy Below
July	12	Loredana Nusciak	64	Italy	Actress	Django; Gladiators 7
July	13	Red Buttons	87	US	Actor	Sayonara; Pete's Dragon
July	19	Pascal Renwick	51	FR	French voice actor	The Terminator; The Running Man; The Matrix
July	19	Jack Warden	85	US	Actor	Heaven Can Wait; 12 Angry Men
July	20	Robert Cornthwaite	89	US	Actor	The War of the Worlds; What Ever Happened to Baby Jane?
July	21	Mako	72	Japan	Actor	Conan the Barbarian; The Sand Pebbles
July	27	Johnny Weissmuller Jr.	65	US	Actor	THX 1138; American Graffiti
July	28	Patrick Allen	79	Malawi	Actor	Dial M for Murder; Jet Storm
August	4	John Alderson	90	UK	Actor	Blazing Saddles; My Fair Lady
August	7	Lois January	92	US	Actress	The Wizard of Oz; The Pace That Kills
August	13	Tony Jay	73	UK	Voice Actor, Actor	The Hunchback of Notre Dame; Beauty and the Beast
August	14	Bruno Kirby	57	US	Actor	City Slickers; When Harry Met Sally...
August	16	Alan Vint	61	US	Actor	Badlands; The Panic in Needle Park
August	19	Sig Shore	87	US	Producer, Director	Super Fly; That's the Way of the World
August	25	Ann Richards	88	Australia	Actress	Sorry, Wrong Number; An American Romance
August	25	Joseph Stefano	84	US	Screenwriter	Psycho; Two Bits
August	29	Bill Stewart	63	UK	Actor	101 Dalmatians; Anna and the King
August	30	Glenn Ford	90	Canada	Actor	Gilda; Superman
August	31	William Aldrich	61	US	Producer, Actor	Flight of the Phoenix; The Sheltering Sky
September	4	Steve Irwin	44	Australia	Wildlife Expert, Actor	The Crocodile Hunter: Collision Course; Happy Feet
September	4	Fernando Siro	74	Argentina	Actor, Director	Where the Wind Dies; Un Argentino en New York
September	5	Hilary Mason	89	UK	Actress	Don't Look Now; Robot Jox
September	7	Robert Earl Jones	96	US	Actor	The Sting; Witness
September	8	Frank Middlemass	87	UK	Actor	Barry Lyndon; The Island
September	9	Gérard Brach	79	France	Director, Screenwriter	The Name of the Rose; Frantic
September	9	Herbert Rudley	96	US	Actor	The Court Jester; The Young Lions
September	11	Pat Corley	76	US	Actor	Coming Home; The Bad News Bears in Breaking Training
September	14	Mickey Hargitay	80	Hungary	Actor	Will Success Spoil Rock Hunter?; The Loves of Hercules
September	14	Johnny Sekka	72	Senegal	Actor	The Message; Ashanti
September	14	Virginia Vale	86	US	Actress	Blonde Comet; Broadway Big Shot
September	19	Elizabeth Allen	77	US	Actress	Donovan's Reef; Star Spangled Girl
September	20	Sven Nykvist	83	Sweden	Cinematographer	Cries and Whispers; The Unbearable Lightness of Being
September	22	Edward Albert	55	US	Actor	Butterflies Are Free; 40 Carats
September	23	Malcolm Arnold	84	UK	Composer	The Bridge on the River Kwai; Suddenly, Last Summer
September	24	Sally Gray	91	UK	Actress	Green for Danger; The Saint in London
September	24	Tetsurō Tamba	84	Japan	Actor	Harakiri; You Only Live Twice
September	26	Lionel Murton	91	UK	Actor	Patton; The Dirty Dozen
September	28	Hy Pyke	70	US	Actor	Blade Runner; Dolemite
October	2	Frances Bergen	84	US	Actress	American Gigolo; The Muppets Take Manhattan
October	2	Tamara Dobson	59	US	Actress	Cleopatra Jones; Norman... Is That You?
October	4	Tom Bell	73	UK	Actor	Wish You Were Here; Feast of July
October	9	Danièle Huillet	70	France	Director	The Chronicle of Anna Magdalena Bach; History Lessons
October	10	Jerry Belson	68	US	Screenwriter, Producer	Always; Fun with Dick and Jane
October	12	Gillo Pontecorvo	86	Italy	Director, Screenwriter	The Battle of Algiers; Kapò
October	15	Derek Bond	86	UK	Actor	Uncle Silas; When Eight Bells Toll
October	16	Jack DeLeon	81	US	Actor	The Hobbit; Life Stinks
October	16	Tommy Johnson	71	US	Musician	The Matrix; The Godfather
October	19	James Glennon	64	US	Cinematographer	About Schmidt; Election
October	19	Phyllis Kirk	79	US	Actress	House of Wax; Back from Eternity
October	20	Jane Wyatt	96	US	Actress	Lost Horizon; Star Trek IV: The Voyage Home
October	21	Peter Barkworth	77	UK	Actor	Patton; Where Eagles Dare
October	21	Daryl Duke	77	Canada	Director	The Silent Partner; The Thorn Birds
October	21	Milton Selzer	87	US	Actor	Sid and Nancy; The Cincinnati Kid
October	22	Arthur Hill	84	Canada	Actor	Harper; The Andromeda Strain
October	22	Richard Mayes	83	UK	Actor	Gandhi; Top Secret!
October	29	Roy Barnes	70	US	Set Designer, Art Director	War of the Worlds; The Last Samurai
October	29	Nigel Kneale	84	UK	Screenwriter	The Entertainer; Quatermass and the Pit
October	31	William Franklyn	81	UK	Actor	Cul-de-sac; The Satanic Rites of Dracula
November	1	Adrienne Shelly	40	US	Actress, Director	Waitress; The Unbelievable Truth
November	2	Leonard Schrader	62	US	Screenwriter	Kiss of the Spider Woman; Blue Collar
November	2	Milly Vitale	73	Italy	Actress	The Seven Little Foys; The Juggler
November	8	Basil Poledouris	61	US	Composer	RoboCop; The Hunt for Red October
November	9	Wayne Artman	69	US	Sound Engineer	Falling Down; Lethal Weapon 3
November	9	Marian Marsh	93	Trinidad	Actress	The Mad Genius; The Black Room
November	10	Diana Coupland	74	UK	Actress	The Twelve Chairs; The Millionairess
November	10	Jack Palance	87	US	Actor	Shane; City Slickers
November	11	Ronnie Stevens	81	UK	Actor	The Parent Trap; Brassed Off
November	14	John Hallam	65	UK	Actor	Robin Hood: Prince of Thieves; Flash Gordon
November	16	Ernest Day	79	UK	Cinematographer, Director	A Passage to India; Superman IV: The Quest for Peace
November	16	Eustace Lycett	91	UK	Special Effects Artist	Mary Poppins; Bedknobs and Broomsticks
November	19	Jeremy Slate	80	US	Actor	The Devil's Brigade; True Grit
November	20	Robert Altman	81	US	Director, Screenwriter	M*A*S*H; Gosford Park
November	20	Kevin McClory	80	Ireland	Producer	Thunderball; Never Say Never Again
November	23	Betty Comden	89	US	Screenwriter, Lyricist	Singin' in the Rain; The Band Wagon
November	23	Philippe Noiret	76	France	Actor	Cinema Paradiso; Il Postino: The Postman
November	24	Phyllis Cerf	90	US	Actress	Vivacious Lady; Little Men
November	27	Alan Freeman	79	Australia	Actor	Dr. Terror's House of Horrors; Absolute Beginners
November	30	Shirley Walker	61	US	Composer, Orchestrator	Batman: Mask of the Phantasm; Final Destination
December	1	Sid Raymond	97	US	Actor, Voice Actor	Two Much; Herman and Katnip
December	4	Adam Williams	84	US	Actor	North by Northwest; Fear Strikes Out
December	5	Michael Gilden	44	US	Actor	Return of the Jedi; Pulp Fiction
December	5	Gerry Humphreys	74	UK	Sound Engineer	Blade Runner; Gandhi
December	5	Van Smith	61	US	Costume Designer, Makeup Artist	Pink Flamingos; Hairspray
December	8	Martha Tilton	91	US	Singer, Actress	Swing Hostess; Crime, Inc.
December	9	Russell Wade	89	US	Actor	Ball of Fire; Mr. & Mrs. Smith
December	12	Ivor Barry	87	UK	Actor	Weird Science; The Andromeda Strain
December	12	Peter Boyle	71	US	Actor	Taxi Driver; Young Frankenstein
December	14	Hallie D'Amore	64	US	Makeup Artist	Forrest Gump; Apollo 13
December	18	Joseph Barbera	95	US	Animator, Director, Producer	The Man Called Flintstone; Jetsons: The Movie
December	20	John Bishop	77	US	Screenwriter	Drop Zone; The Package
December	21	Lois Hall	80	US	Actress	Gone in 60 Seconds; Flightplan
December	22	Philip Pine	86	US	Actor	D.O.A; The Set-Up
December	23	Charlie Drake	81	UK	Actor	The Cracksman; Sands of the Desert
December	25	James Brown	73	US	Singer, Actor	The Blues Brothers; Rocky IV
December	30	Frank Campanella	87	US	Actor	Capone; Dick Tracy

== Film debuts ==
- Dianna Agron – When a Stranger Calls
- Moisés Arias – Nacho Libre
- Dave Bautista – Relative Strangers
- Leïla Bekhti – Sheitan
- Mario Casas – Summer Rain
- Óscar Casas – 53 Winter Days
- Justin Chon – Fleetwood
- Common – Smokin' Aces
- Ana de Armas – Virgin Rose
- Scott Eastwood – Flags of Our Fathers
- Verónica Echegui – My Name Is Juani
- Greta Fernández – Fiction
- Greta Gerwig – LOL
- Bill Hader – Doogal
- Rebecca Hall – Starter for 10
- Scott Haze – Danny Roane: First Time Director
- Sandra Hüller – Requiem
- Avril Lavigne – Over the Hedge
- Kellan Lutz – Stick It
- Deepika Padukone – Aishwarya
- Imogen Poots – V for Vendetta
- Andrea Riseborough – Venus
- Evan Ross – ATL
- Xavier Samuel – 2:37
- Léa Seydoux – Girlfriends
- T.I. – ATL
- Olivia Thirlby – United 93
- Tessa Thompson – When a Stranger Calls
- Adriana Ugarte – Doghead
- Mia Wasikowska – Suburban Mayhem
