= 26th Golden Raspberry Awards =

Award ceremony presented by the Golden Raspberry Award Foundation in 2005

- Date: March 4, 2006
- Site: Ivar Theatre, Hollywood, California

Highlights
- Worst Picture: Dirty Love
- Most awards: Dirty Love (4)
- Most nominations: Son of the Mask (8)

The 26th Golden Raspberry Awards, or Razzies, were held on March 4, 2006, at the Ivar Theatre in Hollywood, California to honor the worst films the film industry had to offer in 2005. The nominations for the Golden Raspberry Awards were announced on January 30, 2006. The most nominated film of the year was Son of the Mask with eight nominations, followed by The Dukes of Hazzard with seven, Dirty Love with six, Deuce Bigalow: European Gigolo and Bewitched with five. The only picture to take home multiple penalties was Dirty Love, with four. The official press release announcing the 2005 winners proclaimed Dirty Love "...a little stinker that no one but [Razzie voters] even seem to know existed."

== Winners and nominees ==
Winner (in bold)

Category		Recipient
Worst Picture		**Dirty Love (First Look)**
Worst Picture		Deuce Bigalow: European Gigolo (Columbia)
Worst Picture		The Dukes of Hazzard (Warner Bros.)
Worst Picture		House of Wax (Warner Bros.)
Worst Picture		Son of the Mask (New Line Cinema)
Worst Actor	Rob Schneider	**Rob Schneider in Deuce Bigalow: European Gigolo as Deuce Bigalow**
Worst Actor	Rob Schneider	Tom Cruise in War of the Worlds as Ray Ferrier
Worst Actor	Rob Schneider	Will Ferrell in Bewitched and Kicking & Screaming as Jack Wyatt/Darrin Stephens and Phil Weston (respectively)
Worst Actor	Rob Schneider	Dwayne Johnson in Doom as Asher "Sarge" Mahonin
Worst Actor	Rob Schneider	Jamie Kennedy in Son of the Mask as Tim Avery
Worst Actress	Jenny McCarthy	**Jenny McCarthy in Dirty Love as Rebecca Sommers**
Worst Actress	Jenny McCarthy	Jessica Alba in Fantastic Four and Into the Blue as Sue Storm/Invisible Woman and Sam (respectively)
Worst Actress	Jenny McCarthy	Hilary Duff in Cheaper by the Dozen 2 and The Perfect Man as Lorraine Baker and Holly Hamilton (respectively)
Worst Actress	Jenny McCarthy	Jennifer Lopez in Monster-in-Law as Charlie Cantillini
Worst Actress	Jenny McCarthy	Tara Reid in Alone in the Dark as Aline Cedrac
Worst Supporting Actor	Hayden Christensen	**Hayden Christensen in Star Wars: Episode III – Revenge of the Sith as Anakin Skywalker**
Worst Supporting Actor	Hayden Christensen	Alan Cumming in Son of the Mask as Loki
Worst Supporting Actor	Hayden Christensen	Bob Hoskins in Son of the Mask as Odin
Worst Supporting Actor	Hayden Christensen	Eugene Levy in Cheaper by the Dozen 2 and The Man as Jimmy Murtaugh and Andy Fidler (respectively)
Worst Supporting Actor	Hayden Christensen	Burt Reynolds in The Dukes of Hazzard and The Longest Yard as Jefferson "Boss" Hogg and Coach Nate Scarborough (respectively)
Worst Supporting Actress	Paris Hilton	**Paris Hilton in House of Wax as Paige Edwards**
Worst Supporting Actress	Paris Hilton	Carmen Electra in Dirty Love as Michelle Lopez
Worst Supporting Actress	Paris Hilton	Katie Holmes in Batman Begins as Rachel Dawes
Worst Supporting Actress	Paris Hilton	Ashlee Simpson in Undiscovered as Clea
Worst Supporting Actress	Paris Hilton	Jessica Simpson in The Dukes of Hazzard as Daisy Duke
Worst Screen Couple	Will Ferrell Nicole Kidman	**Will Ferrell and Nicole Kidman in Bewitched**
Worst Screen Couple	Will Ferrell Nicole Kidman	Jamie Kennedy and "anybody stuck sharing the screen with him" in Son of the Mask
Worst Screen Couple	Will Ferrell Nicole Kidman	Jenny McCarthy and "anyone dumb enough to befriend or date her" in Dirty Love
Worst Screen Couple	Will Ferrell Nicole Kidman	Rob Schneider and his diapers in Deuce Bigalow: European Gigolo
Worst Screen Couple	Will Ferrell Nicole Kidman	Jessica Simpson and her Daisy Dukes in The Dukes of Hazzard
Worst Remake or Sequel		**Son of the Mask (New Line Cinema)**
Worst Remake or Sequel		Bewitched (Columbia)
Worst Remake or Sequel		Deuce Bigalow: European Gigolo (Columbia)
Worst Remake or Sequel		The Dukes of Hazzard (Warner Bros.)
Worst Remake or Sequel		House of Wax (Warner Bros.)
Worst Director		**John Asher for Dirty Love**
Worst Director		Uwe Boll for Alone in the Dark
Worst Director		Jay Chandrasekhar for The Dukes of Hazzard
Worst Director		Nora Ephron for Bewitched
Worst Director		Lawrence Guterman for Son of the Mask
Worst Screenplay	Jenny McCarthy	**Dirty Love, written by Jenny McCarthy**
Worst Screenplay	Jenny McCarthy	Bewitched, written by Nora Ephron, Delia Ephron & Adam McKay
Worst Screenplay	Jenny McCarthy	Deuce Bigalow: European Gigolo, screenplay by Rob Schneider, David Garrett & Jason Ward
Worst Screenplay	Jenny McCarthy	The Dukes of Hazzard, screenplay by John O'Brien
Worst Screenplay	Jenny McCarthy	Son of the Mask, written by Lance Khazei
Most Tiresome Tabloid Targets	Tom Cruise Katie Holmes	**Tom Cruise, Katie Holmes, Oprah Winfrey's couch, the Eiffel Tower, and "Tom's baby"**
Most Tiresome Tabloid Targets	Tom Cruise Katie Holmes	Tom Cruise and his anti-psychiatry rant
Most Tiresome Tabloid Targets	Tom Cruise Katie Holmes	Paris Hilton and ... "who-EVER!"
Most Tiresome Tabloid Targets	Tom Cruise Katie Holmes	Mr. and Mrs. Britney, their baby (Sean Preston Federline), and their camcorder
Most Tiresome Tabloid Targets	Tom Cruise Katie Holmes	The Simpsons: Ashlee, Jessica, and Nick

== Films with multiple nominations ==
These films garnered multiple nominations:

Nominations	Films
8	Son of the Mask
7	The Dukes of Hazzard
6	Dirty Love
5	Bewitched
5	Deuce Bigalow: European Gigolo
3	House of Wax
2	Alone in the Dark
2	Cheaper by the Dozen 2

== Criticism ==
The nomination for Tom Cruise's well received performance for Worst Actor in Steven Spielberg's War of the Worlds was criticized for nominating the actor based on his multiple controversies throughout 2005 (what also reflected in the Most Tiresome Tabloid Targets category) instead of his actual role in the film.

== See also ==
- 2005 in film
- 78th Academy Awards
- 59th British Academy Film Awards
- 63rd Golden Globe Awards
- 12th Screen Actors Guild Awards
