= Babysitter Wanted =

- Promotional poster
- Directed by: Michael Manasseri; Jonas Barnes
- Written by: Jonas Barnes
- Produced by: Kimberley Kates; Michael Manasseri
- Starring: Sarah Thompson; Bruce Thomas; Matt Dallas; Kristen Dalton; Bill Moseley
- Cinematography: Alex Vendler
- Edited by: Stephen Eckelberry
- Music by: Kurt Oldman
- Production company: Big Screen Entertainment Group
- Distributed by: Big Screen Entertainment Group
- Release dates: July 16, 2008 (Fantasia Festival); February 6, 2009 (United States)
- Running time: 93 minutes
- Country: United States
- Language: English

Babysitter Wanted is a 2008 American horror film directed by Jonas Barnes and Michael Manasseri. It was written by Barnes and stars Sarah Thompson as a babysitter who is seemingly stalked while babysitting a strange child in a remote house in northern California.

== Plot ==
Angie Albright starts college in a town far away from home and her deeply religious mother. Her college roommate likes to indulge in smoking weed, and in trying to escape that, Angie finds a job as a babysitter. The couple who live on the outlying farm of Stanton have a son named Sam who is quiet and loves to wear a cowboy outfit, even when sleeping. The couple seems sweet and charming and they offer Angie a job, asking if she is free to babysit Sam the following Saturday night. Angie accepts

She also meets a guy named Rick who she has frequent run-ins with around the campus. On the day of the night that Angie has to babysit, her car quits unexpectedly. Rick offers to fix Angie's car and gives her a ride to the couple's house. As soon as the couple leaves, Angie is disturbed by a series of mysterious phone calls. The prank caller turns out to be a priest who came to kill Sam after knowing Sam's secret, but he is killed by the couple. Sam is then revealed to have two small horns on his head, which he uses the cowboy costume to cover, and is revealed to be the son of the devil. The couple then reveal that they trap young females as Sam only eats human female flesh. The husband, Jim Stanton, then brings back a sedated girl to his tool shed, where he also ties up Angie.

Angie watches in horror and attempts to escape while Stan is precisely marking the other girl for slaughtering. Angie eventually escapes, killing the couple in the process, and injures Sam. When she wakes up in the hospital, the cops inform her that there was no body of a child, meaning Sam wasn't dead.

== Cast ==
- Sarah Thompson as Angie Albright
- Bruce Thomas as Jim Stanton
- Matt Dallas as Rick
- Kristen Dalton as Violet Stanton
- Bill Moseley as Chief Dinneli
- Monty Bane as Father Nicoletta
- Nana Visitor as Linda Albright
- Kai Caster as Sam Stanton
- Jillian Schmitz as Erica
- Jeff Markey as Deputy Connor
- Brett Claywell as Hal
- Scott Spiegel as Dr. Spiegel

== Production ==
Babysitter Wanted was produced by Kimberley Kates and Stephen Eckelberry for Big Screen Entertainment Group. Big Screen Entertainment Group produced the film under the direction of Barnes and Manasseri on the filming locations in Lake Shastina, Montague, Weed and Yreka, California.

== Soundtrack ==
The score was composed by Swiss musician Kurt Oldman.

== Release ==
On February 23, 2009, had a limited theatrical release. The DVD and Blu-ray release is set for May 25, 2010.

== Reception ==
Scott Weinberg at FearNet.com called it "A more-than-passable 80-minute expenditure for the serious horror fans."

== Awards ==
Winner of Best Feature at Weekend of Fear Festival in Nuremberg, Germany. It was also accepted into competition at Fantasporto, Sitges, Hollywood Film Festival, Malaga Film Festival, Montreal's Fantasiafest.

Sarah Thompson's role as Angie Albright was awarded number 30 on Total Film's list of '50 Most Bad-Ass Female Horror Leads'.
