= Dirty Love (film) =

2005 film by John Mallory Asher

- Theatrical release poster
- Directed by: John Mallory Asher
- Written by: Jenny McCarthy
- Produced by: John Mallory Asher; B. J. Davis; Rod Hamilton; Kimberley Kates; Michael Manasseri; Jenny McCarthy; Trent Walford
- Starring: Jenny McCarthy; Eddie Kaye Thomas; Carmen Electra; Victor Webster; Kam Heskin
- Cinematography: Eric Wycoff
- Edited by: Warren Bowman
- Music by: D. A. Young
- Production companies: Big Screen Entertainment Group; DEJ Productions; Double Down Entertainment; Palisades Pictures
- Distributed by: First Look International
- Release dates: January 2005 (Sundance); September 23, 2005
- Running time: 91 minutes
- Country: United States
- Language: English
- Box office: $36,099

Dirty Love is a 2005 American romantic comedy film written by Jenny McCarthy and directed by John Mallory Asher. The film stars McCarthy alongside Eddie Kaye Thomas, Carmen Electra, Victor Webster and Kam Heskin. The film follows a photographer's misadventures in dating after her boyfriend cheats on her.

The film was first shown at the 2005 Sundance Film Festival followed by a limited theatrical release on September 23, 2005. Dirty Love was panned by critics who considered it to be one of the worst films of all time, criticizing its humor, screenplay, acting, and cinematography. At the 26th Golden Raspberry Awards, the film won four of its six Razzie nominations, including Worst Picture, Worst Screenplay, Worst Director, and Worst Actress for McCarthy.

== Plot ==
Rebecca Sommers, a struggling photographer, discovers her model boyfriend Richard cheating on her, which throws her life into turmoil. She alternates between seeking revenge, engaging in casual relationships, and feeling hopeless about love. Her friends, Michelle and Carrie, try to help by setting her up on various dates, including with a peculiar magician and a man with a fish fetish who gives her ecstasy.

In an attempt to make Richard jealous, Rebecca takes a film director reminiscent of Woody Allen to a runway show, but the plan backfires when he vomits on her in public. Eventually, Rebecca realizes that true love is not about jealousy or games. She chooses to be with John, her supportive and caring best friend, who has been there for her throughout her struggles.

== Cast ==
- Jenny McCarthy as Rebecca Sommers
- Eddie Kaye Thomas as John
- Carmen Electra as Michelle López
- Victor Webster as Richard
- Kam Heskin as Carrie Winters
- Deryck Whibley as Tony
- Guillermo Díaz as Tom Houdini

== Development ==
At the time of filming, McCarthy and Asher were married; they divorced the month the film was released.

== Release ==
=== Box office ===
Dirty Love opened theatrically on September 23, 2005, in 44 venues and earned $23,281 in its opening weekend. The film ended its run two weeks later, on October 6, 2005, having grossed a mere $36,099 in the domestic box office.

=== Critical response ===
On the review aggregator website Rotten Tomatoes, 6% of 31 critics' reviews are positive, with an average rating of 2.8/10. The website's consensus reads: "The laugh-free Dirty Love is a comedy dead zone -- it's aggressively crude and shoddily constructed." Metacritic, which uses a weighted average, assigned the film a score of 9 out of 100, based on 12 critics, indicating "overwhelming dislike".

Film critic Roger Ebert of the Chicago Sun-Times gave a rare zero-star rating and said it was the third-worst film of 2005. In his written review, he stated, "Here is a film so pitiful, it doesn't rise to the level of badness. It is hopelessly incompetent."

Stephen Holden of The New York Times gave the film 0/5 stars, writing: "Even by the standards of its bottom-feeding genre, 'Dirty Love' clings to the gutter like a rat in garbage."

Jeremy C. Fox of Pajiba highlighted ironic enjoyment of the film, stating, "Dirty Love is in the worst possible taste. It has crossed the Himalayas of bad taste and come out the other side. And for that reason, if no other, I kinda love it." He concludes, "The response to Dirty Love says less about the movie than it does the bullying, herd-following nature of most movie critics." Oz of eFilmCritic gave the film 3/5 and said "Dirty Love is a surprisingly good effort that will fall short only because of poor direction, poor editing, and the stigma of the lead having only previously been involved in crap."

== Awards and honors ==
| Award | Category | Recipient | Result |
|---|---|---|---|
| Golden Raspberry Awards | Worst Picture | | Won |
| Golden Raspberry Awards | Worst Director | John Mallory Asher | Won |
| Golden Raspberry Awards | Worst Actress | Jenny McCarthy | Won |
| Golden Raspberry Awards | Worst Supporting Actress | Carmen Electra | Nominated |
| Golden Raspberry Awards | Worst Screenplay | Jenny McCarthy | Won |
| Golden Raspberry Awards | Worst Screen Couple | Jenny McCarthy and "anyone dumb enough to befriend or date her" | Nominated |
| Stinkers Bad Movie Awards | Worst Picture | | Nominated |
| Stinkers Bad Movie Awards | Worst Actress | Jenny McCarthy | Nominated |
| Stinkers Bad Movie Awards | Worst Supporting Actress | Carmen Electra | Nominated |
| Stinkers Bad Movie Awards | Most Painfully Unfunny Comedy | | Nominated |
| Stinkers Bad Movie Awards | Most Annoying Fake Accent (Female) | Carmen Electra | Nominated |

== See also ==
- List of American films of 2005

Awards
| Preceded by Catwoman | Golden Raspberry Award for Worst Picture; 26th Golden Raspberry Awards | Succeeded by Basic Instinct 2 |
