= Poor Little Rich Girl =

Poor Little Rich Girl may refer to:

== Theater ==
A 1913 play by Eleanor Gates that was adapted into various films

== Film and TV ==
- The Poor Little Rich Girl, a 1917 Mary Pickford film
- Poor Little Rich Girl (1936 film), starring Shirley Temple
- Poor Little Rich Girl (1965 film), directed by Andy Warhol
- Poor Little Rich Girls (1984 TV series), a sitcom first aired on ITV
- Poor Little Rich Girl: The Barbara Hutton Story, a 1987 TV movie
- Poor Little Rich Girls, a 2004 UK reality television series
- "Poor Little Rich Girl" (The Suite Life of Zack & Cody episode), 2005
- "Poor Little Rich Girl", a 2012 episode of the Indian adaptation The Suite Life of Karan & Kabir

== Music ==
- Poe Little Rich Girl, a 2004 album by Jacki-O
- "Poor Little Rich Girl", a song from the 1925 revue On with the Dance written by Noël Coward
- "Poor Little Rich Girl", a 1960s song written by Carole King and Gerry Goffin
- "Poor Little Rich Girl", a song from the 1980 album National Breakout by The Romantics
- "Poor Little Rich Girl", a song from the 1985 album Equator by Uriah Heep

== People ==
Wealthy American socialites with troubled lives called "poor little rich girl" by the newspapers:

- Barbara Hutton (1912–1979)
- Brenda Frazier (1921–1982)
- Gloria Vanderbilt (1924–2019)
