= 2005 Stinkers Bad Movie Awards =

Award ceremony presented by the Stinkers Bad Movie Awards in 2006

28th Stinkers Bad Movie Awards
- Date: March 3, 2006

Highlights
- Worst Film: Alone in the Dark
- Most awards: Son of the Mask (5)
- Most nominations: Son of the Mask (10)

The 28th Stinkers Bad Movie Awards were released by the Hastings Bad Cinema Society on March 3, 2006, to honour the worst films the film industry had to offer in 2005. The most nominated film of the year was Son of the Mask with ten nominations, which also had five wins. While the usual rotation of categories happened, one notable award introduced was the "Annie" Award; this was meant to call out a film for raising ticket admission prices to inflate box office receipts just like Annie back in 1982. The award, handpicked by Stinkers founders Ray Wright and Mike Lancaster, went to The Producers, as listed below. Dishonorable mentions are also featured for Worst Picture (33 total).

== Winners and nominees ==
=== Worst Picture ===
Film	Production company(s)
Alone in the Dark	Lionsgate
Bewitched	Columbia
Deuce Bigalow: European Gigolo	Columbia
Dirty Love	First Look International
Son of the Mask	New Line

==== Dishonourable Mentions ====
- Æon Flux (Paramount)
- The Adventures of Sharkboy and Lavagirl in 3-D (Dimension)
- Are We There Yet? (Columbia)
- Bad News Bears (Paramount)
- Be Cool (MGM)
- The Brothers Grimm (Dimension)
- The Cave (Screen Gems)
- Chicken Little (Disney)
- Constantine (Warner Bros.)
- Diary of a Mad Black Woman (Lionsgate)
- Domino (New Line)
- Doom (Universal)
- The Dukes of Hazzard (Warner Bros.)
- Elektra (Fox)
- Fantastic Four (Fox)
- The Fog (Columbia)
- Fun with Dick and Jane (Columbia)
- Get Rich or Die Tryin' (Paramount)
- Herbie: Fully Loaded (Disney)
- The Hitchhiker's Guide to the Galaxy (Touchstone)
- The Honeymooners (Paramount)
- Hoodwinked! (TWC)
- House of D (Lionsgate)
- House of Wax (Warner Bros.)
- The Island (DreamWorks)
- Jiminy Glick in Lalawood (MGM)
- Kicking & Screaming (Universal)
- The Longest Yard (Paramount)
- Mindhunters (Dimension)
- Miss Congeniality 2: Armed and Fabulous (Warner Bros.)
- Monster in Law (New Line)
- Mulan II (Disney)
- My Big Fat Independent Movie (Anchor Bay)
- My Date With Drew (DEJ)
- The Pacifier (Disney)
- Palindromes (Genius)
- The Perfect Man (Universal)
- The Producers (Universal)
- Racing Stripes (Warner Bros.)
- Rebound (FOX)
- Sahara (Paramount)
- A Sound of Thunder (Warner Bros.)
- Stealth (Columbia)
- Supercross (Fox)
- Undiscovered (Lionsgate)
- Valiant (Disney, Vanguard)
- War of the Worlds (Paramount)
- White Noise (Universal)
- xXx: State of the Union (Columbia)
- Yours, Mine & Ours (Paramount, MGM, Columbia)

=== Other Categories ===
Special "Annie" Award for Ticket Price Gouging: The Producers ($2.50 more than other movies playing at the same selected theaters!)	Worst Director: Uwe Boll for Alone in the Dark; Jay Chandrasekhar for The Dukes of Hazzard; Nora Ephron for Bewitched; Peter Hyams for A Sound of Thunder; Susan Stroman for The Producers
Worst Actor: Jamie Kennedy in Son of the Mask; Matthew Broderick in The Producers; Johnny Knoxville in Daltry Calhoun, The Dukes of Hazzard, and The Ringer; Rob Schneider in Deuce Bigalow: European Gigolo; Martin Short in Jiminy Glick in Lalawood	Worst Actress: Tara Reid in Alone in the Dark; Sandra Bullock in Miss Congeniality 2: Armed and Fabulous; Nicole Kidman in Bewitched; Jenny McCarthy in Dirty Love; Charlize Theron in Æon Flux
Worst Supporting Actor: Tyler Perry in Diary of a Mad Black Woman as Madea; Ben Kingsley in A Sound of Thunder; George Lopez in The Adventures of Sharkboy and Lavagirl in 3-D; Jonny Lee Miller in Æon Flux and Mindhunters; Peter Stormare in The Brothers Grimm and Constantine	Worst Supporting Actress: Jessica Simpson in The Dukes of Hazzard; Carmen Electra in Dirty Love; Regina Hall in King's Ransom; Carol Kane in The Pacifier; Alicia Silverstone in Beauty Shop
Worst Screenplay for a Film Grossing More Than $100M: Fantastic Four (Fox), written by Michael France and Mark Frost; Fun with Dick and Jane (Columbia), story by Judd Apatow, Nicholas Stoller, and Gerald Gaiser; screenplay by Apatow and Stoller; based on the 1977 film of the same name; The Longest Yard (Paramount), written by Sheldon Turner; based on the 1974 film of the same name; The Pacifier (Disney), written by Thomas Lennon and Robert Ben Garant; Star Wars Episode III: Revenge of the Sith (Fox), written by George Lucas	Most Painfully Unfunny Comedy: Deuce Bigalow: European Gigolo (Columbia); Dirty Love (First Look International); Fun with Dick and Jane (Columbia); Jiminy Glick in Lalawood (MGM); Son of the Mask (New Line)
Worst Song or Song Performance in a Film or Its End Credits: "These Boots Are Made For Walkin'" by Jessica Simpson from The Dukes of Hazzard; "Can't Take My Eyes Off You" by Jamie Kennedy from Son of the Mask; "Dream, Dream, Dream, Dream (Dream, Dream)" by Taylor Lautner from The Adventures of Sharkboy and Lavagirl in 3-D; "Keep It Gay" by Gary Beach from The Producers; "La Vie Boheme" by Anthony Rapp and the cast from Rent; "Over The Moon" by Idina Menzel from Rent; "Smart In A Stupid Way" by Steven Strait and Ashlee Simpson from Undiscovered; "So Long and Thanks For All the Fish" by Neil Hannon from The Hitchhiker's Guide to the Galaxy; "Undiscovered" by Ashlee Simpson from Undiscovered; "Wish I Had an Angel" by Nightwish from Alone in the Dark	Most Intrusive Musical Score: Son of the Mask (New Line); Bewitched (Columbia); Diary of a Mad Black Woman (Lionsgate, BET Pictures); King Kong (Universal); A Sound of Thunder (Warner Bros.)
Less Than Dynamic Duo: Samuel L. Jackson and Eugene Levy in The Man; Sandra Bullock and Regina King in Miss Congeniality 2: Armed and Fabulous; Cedric the Entertainer and Mike Epps in The Honeymooners; Nathan Lane and Matthew Broderick in The Producers; Seann William Scott and Johnny Knoxville in The Dukes of Hazzard	Worst On-Screen Couple: Jamie Kennedy and anyone forced to co-star with him in Son of the Mask; Jim Carrey and Tea Leoni in Fun with Dick and Jane; Hayden Christensen and Natalie Portman in Star Wars Episode III: Revenge of the Sith; Nicole Kidman and Will Ferrell in Bewitched; Dennis Quaid and Rene Russo in Yours, Mine and Ours
Most Annoying Fake Accent (Male): Norm MacDonald in Deuce Bigalow: European Gigolo; Anthony Fazio in In the Mix; John Michael Higgins in Jiminy Glick in Lalawood; Jonny Lee Miller in Mindhunters; Kal Penn in Son of the Mask	Most Annoying Fake Accent (Female): Jessica Simpson in The Dukes of Hazzard; Carmen Electra in Dirty Love; Carol Kane in The Pacifier; Nicole Kidman in Bewitched; Alicia Silverstone in Beauty Shop
Least "Special" Special Effects: Alone in the Dark (Lionsgate); The Adventures of Sharkboy and Lavagirl in 3-D (Dimension); Herbie: Fully Loaded for Lindsay Lohan's digital breast reduction (Disney); Son of the Mask (New Line); A Sound of Thunder (Warner Bros.)	Worst Remake: Yours, Mine and Ours (Paramount); Fun with Dick and Jane (Columbia); House of Wax (Warner Bros.); The Longest Yard (Paramount); The Producers (Universal)
Worst Sequel: Son of the Mask (New Line); Be Cool (MGM); Deuce Bigalow: European Gigolo (Columbia); Miss Congeniality 2: Armed and Fabulous (Warner Bros.); The Ring Two (DreamWorks)	Worst Resurrection of a "Classic" TV Series: The Honeymooners (Paramount); Bewitched (Columbia); The Dukes of Hazzard (Warner Bros.)
The Spencer Breslin Award (for Worst Performance by a Child in a Feature Role): Adrian Alonso in The Legend of Zorro; Jake Church in Brokeback Mountain; Jacob Davich in The Adventures of Sharkboy and Lavagirl in 3-D; Aaron Michael Drozin in Fun with Dick and Jane; Max Thieriot in The Pacifier	Worst Child Ensemble: Yours, Mine and Ours (Paramount); The Adventures of Sharkboy and Lavagirl in 3-D (Dimension); Bad News Bears (Paramount); Cheaper by the Dozen 2 (Fox); The Pacifier (Disney)
Foulest Family Film: Son of the Mask (New Line); The Adventures of Sharkboy and Lavagirl in 3-D (Dimension); Bad News Bears (Paramount); The Pacifier (Disney); Yours, Mine and Ours (Paramount)	Least Scary Horror Movie: The Fog (Columbia); Cursed (Miramax); Hide and Seek (Fox); House of Wax (Warner Bros.); The Ring Two (DreamWorks)
Most Overrated Film: Syriana (Warner Bros.); Brokeback Mountain (Focus Features); The 40-Year-Old Virgin (Universal); King Kong (Universal); Munich (Universal)	Worst Animated Film: Chicken Little (Disney); Madagascar (DreamWorks); Racing Stripes (Warner Bros.); Robots (Blue Sky, Fox); Valiant (Disney, Vanguard)

Nominations	Film
10	Son of the Mask
7	Bewitched
7	The Dukes of Hazzard
6	The Adventures of Sharkboy and Lavagirl in 3-D
6	The Pacifier
6	The Producers
5	Alone in the Dark
5	Deuce Bigalow: European Gigolo
5	Dirty Love
5	Fun with Dick and Jane
4	A Sound of Thunder
4	Yours, Mine and Ours
3	Jiminy Glick in Lalawood
3	Miss Congeniality 2: Armed and Fabulous
2	Æon Flux
2	Bad News Bears
2	Beauty Shop
2	Brokeback Mountain
2	Diary of a Mad Black Woman
2	The Honeymooners
2	House of Wax
2	King Kong
2	The Longest Yard
2	Mindhunters
2	Rent
2	The Ring Two
2	Star Wars Episode III: Revenge of the Sith
2	Undiscovered

The following films received multiple wins:

Wins	Film
5	Son of the Mask
4	Alone in the Dark
3	The Dukes of Hazzard
2	Deuce Bigalow: European Gigolo
2	Yours, Mine and Ours
