= Kimberley Kates =

American actress and film producer

- Occupations: Actress, film producer
- Years active: 1987–present

Kimberley Kates is an American actress and film producer. Kates is best known for her role as Princess Elizabeth in Bill & Ted's Excellent Adventure (1989). She founded and is currently the CEO of Big Screen Entertainment Group, a Los Angeles–based publicly traded film production and distribution company.

== Career ==
Kates's movie debut came in Bill & Ted's Excellent Adventure as Princess Elizabeth, starring alongside Keanu Reeves, Diane Franklin, Alex Winter, and George Carlin.

As an actress and prior to becoming a full-time film producer, Kates starred in more than 40 films and television shows. Her credits include television shows such as Seinfeld, The Larry Sanders Show, Charmed, Growing Pains, Murder She Wrote, On Our Own, Sucker, and films such as Dangerous Love, Rescue Me, Chained Heat II, The New Age, Bounce and Highway.

As a producer, she has worked on several films including, Dirty Love, Babysitter Wanted, William Shatner's Gonzo Ballet, Rami Malek's Papillon and Bruce Willis' Air Strike.

In 1995, Kates collaborated with Michael Manasseri and established a film production and distribution company, which was renamed Big Screen Entertainment Group (OTC: BSEG) in August 2005, a publicly traded firm with its headquarters in Los Angeles.

== Filmography ==
Film
Year	Film	Role	Notes
1987	Venus Flytrap	Ginger	Direct-to-video release
1988	Dangerous Love	Susan	Credited as Kimberley LaBelle
1989	Bill & Ted's Excellent Adventure	Princess Elizabeth	Credited as Kimberley LaBelle
1992	Rescue Me	Cindy	Alternative title: Street Hunter
1993	Chained Heat II	Alex Morrison	
1994	The Pornographer	Bettina	Alternative title: Family Values
1994	The New Age	Other Catherine	
1994	Bad Blood	Lindee	Alternative title: Viper
1996	Which Way to Oz	The Girlfriend	
1998	Armstrong	Susan Zorkin	
1998	Charades	Laura	Alternative titles: Felons; First Degree
1999	Traitor's Heart	Maggie Brody	
2000	Bounce	Woman at Bar	Uncredited
2002	Highway	Jilly Miranda	
2005	Dirty Love	-	Producer
2006	Forget About It	Michelle Winchester	Producer
2006	Lightfield's Home Videos	-	Producer
2007	The Mirror	-	Producer
2008	Babysitter Wanted	-	Producer
2009	William Shatner's Gonzo Ballet	-	Executive producer
2011	Sodium Babies	-	Executive producer
2013	Sucker	-	Producer
2013	Singularity Principle	-	Executive Producer
2015	Untitled Snow White Project	-	Producer
2015	Code Z	-	Producer
2016	20,000 Leagues Under the Sea	-	Executive Producer
2016	Flathead Lake		Producer
2016	Father & Son	-	Special Thanks
2016	Equal Means Equal	-	Special Thanks
2016	OZZY	-	Distribution Executive
2017	Papillon	-	Distribution Executive (China)
2018	Air Strike	-	Executive Producer
2018	This Gets Ruff	-	Producer
2018	Girl Zero	-	Producer
2019	Overspeed	-	Producer
2019	Song of Love	-	Producer
2020	Bill & Ted Face the Music	-	Special Thanks
Television
Year	Title	Role	Notes
1987	Growing Pains	Sheena "Woo Woo" Berkowitz	1 episode
1989	Freddy's Nightmares	Christina	1 episode
1989	Alien Nation	Dallas Ft Worth	1 episode
1990	Seinfeld	Diane	1 episode
1990	Sporting Chance	Betsy Hilderbrand	Television movie
1991	The Wonder Years	Carol	1 episode
1992	Eek! The Cat	Additional voices	Unknown episodes
1992	The Larry Sanders Show	Sally	1 episode
1994	The Byrds of Paradise	Elaine	1 episode
1994	On Our Own	Alana Michaels	10 episodes
1994	Silk Stalkings	Glee	1 episode
1995	The Watcher		1 episode
1996	Kindred: The Embraced	Elaine Robb	1 episode
1996	Murder, She Wrote	Kim Swofford	1 episode
1996	The Sentinel	Laura McCarthy	1 episode
1996	Public Morals	Moira Fogarty	1 episode
1996	The Burning Zone	Rebecca	1 episode
1999	Charmed	Tanjella	1 episode
1999	Blue Valley Songbird	Thelma Russell	Television movie
