= Corky Romano =

2001 film by Rob Pritts

- Theatrical release poster
- Directed by: Rob Pritts
- Written by: David Garrett; Jason Ward
- Produced by: Robert Simonds
- Starring: Chris Kattan; Peter Berg; Chris Penn; Richard Roundtree; Vinessa Shaw; Fred Ward; Peter Falk
- Cinematography: Steven Bernstein
- Edited by: Alan Cody
- Music by: Randy Edelman
- Production company: Touchstone Pictures
- Distributed by: Buena Vista Pictures Distribution
- Release date: October 12, 2001
- Running time: 86 minutes
- Country: United States
- Language: English
- Budget: $11 million
- Box office: $25.3 million

Corky Romano is a 2001 American mafia comedy film starring Chris Kattan, Fred Ward, Vinessa Shaw, Chris Penn, and Peter Berg. The film was produced by Robert Simond, directed by Rob Pritts, and was written by David Garrett and Jason Ward. In the film, Kattan plays the title character, a veterinarian who is forced by his mobster family to infiltrate the local FBI facility to steal evidence incriminating his father, Mafia boss Francis A. "Pops" Romano (Peter Falk), of racketeering charges. It opened in theaters on October 12, 2001.

== Plot ==
Veterinary technician Corky Romano, banished from his family after the death of his mother, is unaware of their criminal connections until he receives a call from his father "Pops", a Mafia crime lord. Indicted on racketeering charges and knowing the strong case against him, Pops has concluded the only solution is to destroy the FBI’s evidence.

At the family mansion, a bedridden Pops convinces Corky to infiltrate the local FBI office, since the Romano family cannot send anyone with known underworld connections, such as Corky's brothers Paulie and Peter. With the aid of a computer hacker, Corky obtains a false identity (“Agent Corky Pissant”) and gains access to the building. There he discovers from office chief Howard Schuster that, according to his falsified résumé, "Pissant" graduated from Harvard, speaks five different languages, is an expert sharpshooter, and has extensive martial arts training (called Jung Moo Kwon (Note: Perhaps spuriously. It is not one of the major schools of Taekwondo. Russo calls it this when she invites “Pissant” to spar with her; while sparring she also mentions Tang Soo Do.)).

Corky makes several trips to the evidence room, only to be sidetracked each time. He is sent on investigations and raids, with several assignments tied to the Night Vulture, a heroin trafficker who is number six on the FBI's Most Wanted List. Corky's frequent mistakes often inadvertently solve the problem at hand, leading others at the FBI to assume Corky has developed intricate strategies. He receives praise at the office and in the local media, though Agent Brick Davis remains jealous and aloof.

Corky develops feelings for FBI agent Kate Russo, but she seems uninterested until they bump into each other at the Romano mansion, where Russo has been sent undercover to collect more evidence against the family. Corky convinces Russo that he is also working undercover, and befriends agents Bob Cox and Terrence Darnell. Cox and Darnell are captured trying to infiltrate one of Pops' underground casinos; Corky comes to the rescue, but is caught by the bouncers. Revealed to be a member of the Romano family, he asks them to let his friends go.

Corky obtains the evidence file regarding Pops, and discovers that his father will be facing murder charges. Shocked, he reproaches Pops, who vehemently denies killing anyone. When Corky’s brothers try to kick him out, he makes a righteous stand; his demand to take his place in the family stirs up revelations about Paulie's inability to read and Peter being a homosexual. (Note: Hints at Peter’s sexuality feature as a running gag.) Snooping through family photo albums, Russo discovers that Corky is a Romano and not an FBI agent. Concurrently, the FBI office raids the Romano mansion, where it is revealed that family friend Leo Corrigan is an FBI informant and has been lying about the extent of the family's crimes, including the alleged murder; it also comes out that Brick Davis is the Night Vulture. Corky knocks Leo unconscious with a light fixture, and Davis is arrested by his fellow agents.

Corky and Russo marry and drive off in Corky's bright orange Mazda Miata. Corky gains the respect and love of his entire family and his former boss at the veterinary clinic retires, giving Corky the keys to the business.

== Cast ==
- Chris Kattan as Corky Romano/Agent Pissant
- Peter Berg as Paulie Romano, Corky's older brother
- Chris Penn as Peter Romano, Corky's older brother
- Richard Roundtree as Howard Shuster
- Vinessa Shaw as Agent Kate Russo, Corky's love interest
- Matthew Glave as Agent Brick Davis
- Fred Ward as Leo Corrigan
- Peter Falk as Francis A. "Pops" Romano, Corky's widowed father
- Dave Sheridan as Agent Terrence Darnell
- Kip King as veterinarian Doctor Kipper
- Vincent Pastore as Tony
- Michael Massee as Angry Gunman
- Roger Fan as Agent Bob Cox
- Zach Galifianakis as Computer Hacker Dexter
- Rena Mero as Female Bouncer
- John Farley as Ice Cream Vendor

== Production ==
In his 2019 autobiography Baby Don't Hurt Me, Chris Kattan claimed that Paul Thomas Anderson (writer-director of Boogie Nights and Magnolia) and Richard LaGravenese (screenwriter of The Fisher King) each assisted with rewriting the script for Corky Romano, for which they received no official credit.

The nickname "Corky" is alleged to be taken from real life New Jersey mobster Gaetano Vastola whose nickname among the mafia ranks as a street soldier was "Corky".

== Critical reception ==
Corky Romano was panned by critics. On Rotten Tomatoes, it holds a 7% rating based on 83 reviews with the consensus stating: "Corky Romano continues the trend of bad movies featuring SNL members. The jokes are tired and unfunny, and the slapstick feels forced." Metacritic, which uses a weighted average, assigned the film a score of 20 out of 100, based on 23 critics, indicating "generally unfavorable" reviews.

James Berardinelli rated the film half a star out of four, stating: "It only takes about three minutes of running time to realize that you have wasted your money. The question is whether you have the stamina to endure all 80 minutes. 'I survived Corky' tee-shirts should be given out to everyone who stays until the end credits roll and can provide proof that they didn't take the easy way out of napping." Berardinelli added that he might have cited it as his likely choice as the worst movie of 2001 but for Freddy Got Fingered. Roger Ebert also rated the film half a star out of four stars, calling it "a desperately unfunny gangster spoof" and wrote: "The concept is exhausted, the ideas are tired, the physical gags are routine, the story is labored, the actors look like they can barely contain their doubts about the project." Miles Beller was one of the few critics who gave a positive review, saying: "Although Corky Romano contains its share of witless wisecracks and puerile pranks, it achieves something more than the current crop of would-be funny films. With a great many contemporary comedies mistaking excess for invention and hyperactivity for dynamism, Corky Romano displays genuine heart."

Actor Robert Pattinson has listed the film as one of his personal favorites.

== Box office ==
The film was overall a commercial success for producer Robert Simonds, earning back its $11 million budget against $24,400,000 domestically. Corky Romano was released on VHS and DVD on May 14, 2002.

== See also ==
- Taekwondo
