= Lynn Cohen =

American actress (1933–2020)

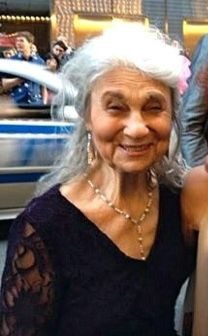
- Cohen in 2014
- Born: Lynn Harriette Kay; August 10, 1933; Kansas City, Missouri, U.S.
- Died: February 14, 2020 (aged 86); New York City, U.S.
- Years active: 1968–2020
- Spouses: Gilbert L. Frazen (m. 1957; died 1960) Ronald T. Cohen (m. 1964)
- Children: 1

Lynn Harriette Cohen (née Kay; August 10, 1933 – February 14, 2020) was an American actress known for her roles in film, television and theater. She was particularly known for her role as Magda in the HBO series Sex and the City, which she also played in the 2008 film of the same name and its 2010 sequel, as well as for portraying Mags in The Hunger Games: Catching Fire and Mrs. Litvak in The Vigil.

== Early life ==
The daughter of Louis Kay and Bertha Cornsweet Kay, Lynn Harriette Kay was born in Kansas City, Missouri, to a Jewish family. She studied for a year each at the University of Wisconsin and Northwestern University, after which she moved to St. Louis, where she began acting in regional theater.

== Career ==
Cohen began her career in the 1970s appearing in Off-Broadway productions, receiving Drama League Award and Lucille Lortel Awards nominations. Notable credits include Hamlet starring Kevin Kline and Macbeth starring Liev Schreiber. On Broadway, Cohen appeared in Orpheus Descending starring Vanessa Redgrave (1989) and Ivanov, reuniting her with Kevin Kline (1994).

Cohen consistently played powerful, impressive women. Her first notable film role was in the 1993 comedy Manhattan Murder Mystery. From 1993 to 2006, she played Judge Elizabeth Mizener in the NBC drama series Law & Order, appearing in a total of 12 episodes. She also guest-starred on NYPD Blue, Law & Order: Special Victims Unit, Law & Order: Criminal Intent, Blue Bloods, and had a recurring role on Damages.

From 2000 to 2004, Cohen had a recurring role as Magda in the HBO comedy series Sex and the City. She reprised her role in the 2008 film of the same name, as well as its 2010 sequel. Cohen also appeared in Munich (2005) as Golda Meir, Vanya on 42nd Street, Synecdoche, New York, Eagle Eye and The Hunger Games: Catching Fire.

== Personal life ==
Cohen married Gilbert Frazen in 1957, and he died in 1960. In 1964, she married Ronald Theodore Cohen, and they remained married until her death in 2020. She had one adult child and two grandchildren.

== Death ==
Cohen died on February 14, 2020, in New York at the age of 86.

== Filmography ==
=== Feature films ===
Year	Title	Role	Notes
1983	Without a Trace	Woman with Dog	
1993	Manhattan Murder Mystery	Lillian House	
1994	Vanya on 42nd Street	Vonenskaya	
1996	I Shot Andy Warhol	Hotel Earle Concierge	
1996	Walking and Talking	Andrew's mom	
1996	Everything Relative	Mrs. Kessler	
1997	Hurricane Streets	Lucy	
1997	Deconstructing Harry	Janet's mom	
1997	Once We Were Strangers	Natasha	
1997	My Divorce	Mother	
1998	Meschugge	Mrs. Fish	
1999	Cradle Will Rock	Mama Silvano	
1999	Just One Time	Sophia	
2000	Fast Food Fast Women	Jesse	
2000	Ten Hundred Kings	Anne Shephard	
2001	The Jimmy Show	Ruth	
2002	Hi-Yah!	Gramma	
2002	Fishing	Ruthie	
2003	The Station Agent	Patty	
2004	Evergreen	Grandmom	
2004	Last Call	Betsy	
2005	The Last Days of Leni Riefenstahl	Leni Riefenstahl	Short film
2005	While the Widow Is Away	The Widow	Short film
2005	Munich	Golda Meir	
2006	Invincible	Mrs. Spegnetti	
2006	The Hottest State	Harris's mother	
2006	Delirious	Muffy Morrison	
2007	The Summoning of Everyman	Doctor	
2007	Ablution	Esther	Short film
2007	Then She Found Me	Trudy Epner	
2007	The Life Before Her Eyes	Sister Beatrice	
2007	Across The Universe	Grandmother Carrigan	
2008	Deception	Woman	
2008	Sex and the City	Magda	
2008	Synecdoche, New York	Caden's mother	
2008	Eagle Eye	Mrs. Wierzbowski	
2008	Eavesdrop	May	
2009	Staten Island	Dr. Leikovic	
2009	Everybody's Fine	Old Woman on First Train	
2010	The Extra Man	Lois Huber	
2010	A Little Help	Mrs. Cosolito	
2010	Sex and the City 2	Magda	
2010	Hello Lonesome	Eleanor	
2010	The Kindergarten Shuffle	Lynn	
2011	Somewhere Tonight	Mrs. Pecorino	
2012	The Romance of Loneliness	Mina	
2012	Not Waving but Drowning	Sylvia	
2012	Art Machine	Roberta	
2012	Where Is Joel Baum?	Mrs. Stein	
2013	Bottled Up	Gladys	
2013	A Case of You	Harriet	
2013	The Hunger Games: Catching Fire	Mags Flanagan	
2014	Gabriel	Nonny	
2014	Chasing Taste	Murial	
2014	They Came Together	Bubby	
2014	The Cobbler	Sarah Simkin	
2015	All in Time	Mrs. Joshnman	
2015	A Woman Like Me	Alex's mom	
2016	The Pickle Recipe	Rose	
2017	Sollers Point	Ladybug	
2017	Walden: Life in The Woods	Alice	
2018	Benji the Dove	Miss O'Dell	
2018	Omphalos	Babs	
2019	After Class	Agatha	
2019	The World Without You	Gretchen	
2019	Lingua Franca	Olga	
2019	Feast of the Seven Fishes	Nonnie	
2019	The Vigil	Mrs. Litvak	
2020	God Friended Me	Rose	

=== Television ===
Year	Title	Role	Notes
1980	One Life to Live	Nurse	
1982	Texas	Nurse	8 episodes
1991	Golden Years	Recepcionist	
1993–2006	Law & Order	Judge Elizabeth Mizener	12 episodes
1994	Guiding Light	Dr. Fromer	
1995	As the World Turns	Judge Kaplan	
1997	Cosby	Dorothy	Episode: "Florida"
2000-2004	Sex and the City	Magda	14 episodes
2007	Days of Our Lives	Ms. Ashwell	
2009–2012	Damages	Stefania McKee	4 episodes
2009–2012	Nurse Jackie	Mrs. Zimberger	2 episodes
2011	Law & Order: Special Victims Unit	Donna Rosa Doletti	Episode: "Beef"
2014	The Affair	Joan Bailey	2 episodes
2014	Getting On	Janice Carmaglia	Episode: "No Such Thing as Idealized Genitalia"
2015	Master of None	Carol	
2015	Deadbeat	Edith Jane	Episode: "Last Dance with Edith Jane"
2016	Chicago Med	Rose Wechsler	Episode: "Withdrawal"
2018	Blue Bloods	Mrs. Costello	Episode: "Mind Games"
2018	The Marvelous Mrs. Maisel	Bubbabosia	Episode: "Look, She Made a Hat"

=== Videogames ===
- Red Dead Redemption (2010, Video Game) – Mrs. Bush (voice)
