= Kristen Dalton (actress) =

American actress (born 1973)

- Occupation: Actress
- Years active: 1989–present
- Website: www.kristendalton.com

Kristen Dalton is an American actress, known for starring in USA Network's The Dead Zone.

== Life and career ==
Dalton secured her first role in Tango & Cash in 1989, ahead of a small role in A Night at the Roxbury in 1998. She also appeared as Gwen, the girlfriend of Frank Costello (portrayed by Jack Nicholson) in The Departed (2006).

Dalton is perhaps best known for her role as reporter Dana Bright in USA Network's The Dead Zone, starring Anthony Michael Hall.

Her other television appearances include Beverly Hills, 90210, Murder, She Wrote, Diagnosis Murder, Sliders, Stargate SG-1, and CSI: NY. She has also appeared in TV movies, such as Danielle Steel's Family Album, They Nest, Surviving Gilligan's Island (2001) (portraying actress Tina Louise), Babysitter Wanted and Gleason.
