= Bruce Thomas (actor) =

American actor (born 1961)

- Occupation: Actor
- Years active: 1992–present
- Known for: Kyle XY; Halo 4 Halo 5: Guardians; Halo Infinite; Call of Duty: Black Ops Cold War; Call of Duty: Black Ops 6

Bruce Thomas is an American actor. He is known for being the motion capture actor of Master Chief in Halo 4, Halo 5: Guardians and Halo Infinite as well as portraying Russell Adler in Call of Duty: Black Ops Cold War and Call of Duty: Black Ops 6. He first came to prominence for portraying the character of Batman in a series of commercials for General Motors' OnStar service that aired from 2000 to 2002.

== Career ==
He was featured in Legally Blonde, as well as its sequel Legally Blonde 2: Red, White & Blonde, as the "UPS guy". He was featured in the 2008 film Babysitter Wanted. He co-starred on the ABC Family original series Kyle XY as Stephen Trager from 2006 to 2009. He starred as JP Gratton in the episode "The He in the She" in the series Bones on October 8, 2008.

Thomas has also been featured in the sitcom Wings as well as on Weeds. He provided the voices of Atrocitus in Green Lantern: Emerald Knights, Ezra Loomis in Gears of War: Judgement, DeSaad in Justice League: War, and James Gordon in Son of Batman.

He provided motion capture for Spartan John-117, the protagonist of the video game Halo 4 (2012), also doing so for Halo 5: Guardians (2015) and Halo Infinite (2021).

It has long been erroneously reported that Thomas reprised his role as Batman in the pilot episode of Birds of Prey. Thomas personally dispelled this fact during a podcast interview. Batman was actually portrayed by stuntman Alex Daniels.

== Filmography ==
=== Film ===
Year	Title	Role	Notes
1992	Army of Darkness	Mini-Ash #2	
2001	Legally Blonde	UPS Guy	
2003	Legally Blonde 2: Red, White & Blonde	UPS Guy	
2004	A Boyfriend for Christmas	Ted Powell	TV film
2008	Babysitter Wanted	Jim Stanton	
2011	Hall Pass	Rick Coleman	
2011	Green Lantern: Emerald Knights	Atrocitus (voice)	Direct-to-video
2013	Raze	Kurtz	
2014	Justice League: War	DeSaad (voice)	Direct-to-video
2014	Son of Batman	James Gordon, Ubu (voice)	Direct-to-video
2015	Camino	Handsome Gent	
2015	Justice League: Gods and Monsters	General Zod, Darkseid (voice)	Direct-to-video
2016	Batman: Bad Blood	James Gordon (voice)	Direct-to-video
2019	Batman: Hush	James Gordon (voice)	Direct-to-video

=== Television ===
Year	Title	Role	Notes
1995	Models Inc.	Trevor Winslow	Episode: "Exposure"
1995	All My Children	Dr. Jonathan Kinder	1 episode
1995	Ellen	Mike Lyons	Episode: "She Ain't Friendly, She's My Mother"
1996	The John Larroquette Show	David	Episode: "Happy Endings"
1996– 1998	Beverly Hills 90210	Carl Schmidt, Hank Bradley	4 episodes
1999	Providence	Beau Tucker	Episode: "All Good Dogs Go to Heaven"
1999	The Bold and the Beautiful	Trevor McEvoy	5 episodes
1999	Nash Bridges	Rocky Brush	Episode: "Trade Off"
2000	Port Charles	Dr. Joshua Lock	4 episodes
2004	Star Trek: Enterprise	Xindi-Reptilian Soldier	3 episodes
2005– 2006	Weeds	Megan's Dad	2 episodes
2006	E-Ring	Dr. Wolfe	Episode: "War Crimes"
2006– 2009	Kyle XY	Stephen Trager	43 episodes
2008	Bones	JP Gratton	Episode: "The He in the She"
2008	Desperate Housewives	Peter Hickey	Episode: "There's Always a Woman"
2014	Turbo Fast	Boss Spider, Paul (voice)	Episode: "A Tale of Two Turbos"
2014	Beware the Batman	Anatol Mykros (voice)	Episode: "Unique"
2014	Rake	Clay Randolph	Episode: "Bigamist"
2014	Baby Daddy	Jim	Episode: "The Bet"
2014– 2015	Faking It	Liam's Dad	6 episodes
2015	Justice League: Gods and Monsters Chronicles	Kobra (voice)	Episode: "Big"
2016	NCIS	Richard Porter	Episode: "React"
2017	NCIS: Los Angeles	LA District Attorney Frank Gibson	Episode: "Queen Pin"
2017– 2018	Freedom Fighters: The Ray	Richard Terrill (voice)	4 episodes
2019, 2025	Love, Death & Robots	Sr. Sergeant Kravchenko, Private Kaminsky, Major (voice)	2 episodes

=== Video games ===
Year	Title	Voice role	Notes
2012	Halo 4	Spartan John-117 / Interrogator	Motion capture only
2013	Gears of War: Judgment	Colonel Ezra Loomis	
2013	Lightning Returns: Final Fantasy XIII	Additional voices	English dub
2015	Mobius Final Fantasy	Additional voices	English dub
2015	Halo 5: Guardians	Spartan John-117	Motion capture only
2015	Fallout 4	Daniel Finch, Nathan Filmore, Drifter	
2015	Rise of the Tomb Raider	Additional voices	
2016	Fallout 4: Nuka-World	Cleansed, Zachariah, Pack Captives	
2020	Gears Tactics	Sid Redburn	Voice
2020	Call of Duty: Black Ops Cold War	Russell Adler	Voice and performance capture
2021	Halo Infinite	Spartan John-117	Motion capture only
2022	Horizon Forbidden West	Vezreh, Aluf, additional voices	
2022	Star Ocean: The Divine Force	Bertrand Hyrein	
2024	Final Fantasy VII Rebirth	Gi Nattak	
2024	Call of Duty: Black Ops 6	Russell Adler	Voice and performance capture

Preceded by George Clooney	Portrayer of Batman; 2000–2002	Succeeded by Christian Bale
