= The Pickle Recipe =

- Directed by: Michael Manasseri
- Screenplay by: Sheldon Cohn; Gary Wolfson
- Story by: Sheldon Cohn; Gary Wolfson
- Produced by: Sheldon Cohn; Paul Finkel; Michael Manasseri; Jason Potash; Gary Wolfson
- Starring: Jon Dore; Lynn Cohen; David Paymer
- Cinematography: Geoff George
- Edited by: Stewart Shevin
- Music by: Michel Bisceglia
- Production companies: Storyboard Entertainment; Flux Capacitor Studios
- Distributed by: Adopt Films; Gravitas Ventures
- Release date: January 31, 2016 (Santa Barbara)
- Running time: 97 minutes
- Country: United States
- Language: English

The Pickle Recipe is a 2016 American comedy film directed by Michael Manasseri and starring Jon Dore, Lynn Cohen and David Paymer.

== Plot ==
Entertainer Joseph Miller is desperately in need of money. Recently all of his equipment for his job burned in a fire. His daughter Julie’s Bat Mitzvah is only a month away. He needs $20,000 in order to buy the replacement equipment. Now Joey’s grandmother Rose, an 85 year old Polish woman, holds what could be the world’s greatest pickle recipe. When Joey asks his Uncle Morty for help to get the money he needs, Morty suggests that together they steal the pickle recipe. The only problem, grandma Rose has not shared the recipe with a single other soul, nor is she looking to do so.

== Cast ==
- Jon Dore as Joey
- Lynn Cohen as Rose
- Miriam Lee as Hana
- David Paymer as Uncle Morty
- Eric Edelstein as Ted
- Taylor Groothuis as Julie
- Ashley Noel as Fran
- Jean Zarzour as Psychic

== Reception ==
The film has a 33% rating on Rotten Tomatoes. Michael Heaton of The Plain Dealer graded the film a C+. Tom Long of The Detroit News graded the film a B.

Mark Sommer of The Buffalo News awarded the film two and a half stars out of four. Michael O'Sullivan of The Washington Post awarded it one and a half stars out of four. Bill Goodykoontz of The Arizona Republic gave the film two stars out of five.

The film also was featured at such festivals as Atlanta Jewish Film Festival and Enzian Theater.
