= Dangerous Love (1988 film) =

1988 American crime film by Marty Ollstein

- Directed by: Marty Ollstein
- Written by: Marty Ollstein
- Produced by: Brad Krevoy; Steven Stabler
- Starring: Elliott Gould; Lawrence Monoson; Brenda Bakke
- Cinematography: Nicholas von Sternberg
- Edited by: Tony Lanza
- Music by: Paul Hertzog
- Distributed by: Motion Picture Corporation of America
- Release date: September 1988
- Running time: 96 minutes
- Country: United States
- Language: English

Dangerous Love is a 1988 American crime film starring Elliott Gould, Lawrence Monoson and Brenda Bakke.

== Plot ==
A psychopath videotapes then murders female clients of a dating service, and suspicion falls on a geeky computer executive.

== Cast ==
- Elliott Gould as Rick
- Lawrence Monoson as Gabe
- Brenda Bakke as Chris
- Angelyne as Josie
- Peter Marc Jacobson as Jay
- Teri Austin as Dominique
- Sal Landi as Rob
- Anthony Geary as Mickey
- Kimberley Kates as Susan

== Reception ==
Leonard Maltin rated the movie a "bomb". The Blockbuster Entertainment Guide referred to it as "a Peeping Tom for the '80s that falls flat on its face."
