= Kurt Oldman =

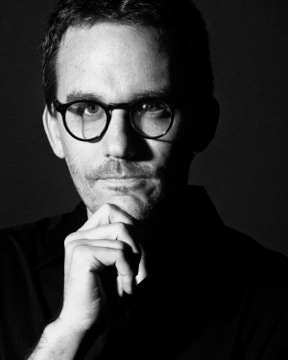
- Education: Conservatory of Music in Fribourg and Lucerne Swiss Jazz School
- Occupations: Film composer; musician

Kurt Oldman is a Swiss born composer of music for television and film.

== Early life and career ==
Oldman was born in Switzerland to parents who were both musicians. His father attended the Conservatory of Music in Fribourg. His grandfather and great-grandfather were also classical musicians. Oldman received musical training at the Fribourg Conservatory and the Lucerne Swiss Jazz School in Lucerne, Switzerland. As a young child he was inspired by several film music scores, including the score for E.T. The first film that Oldman scored was Endless Escape, a 2.5 hours Swiss-produced feature docu-drama. After this he attended film scoring classes at UCLA during the beginning part of his career.

== Career ==
Oldman produces music mainly for films and TV. His early film work includes the independent films Killer Holiday, (Lionsgate) 2013, Babysitter Wanted, Neighbor, All Along, Holiday Baggage, King of Paper Chasin and Tapia, a documentary about the world champion boxer, Johnny Tapia, which aired on HBO. He has also served as music programmer and arranger on Guardians of the Galaxy, Guardians of the Galaxy Vol. 2 and The Spy Who Dumped Me.

In 2015, Oldman started scoring Sony's stop motion animation series SuperMansion, which airs on Sony Crackle and Adult Swim.

Oldman is known for using alternative sounds as a part of his scores, implementing them into his electronic instruments for musical adaptation. The kinds of guitars he has worked with include acoustics, electrics and mandolins.

Michael Allen, a horror reviewer, described the score for Killer Holiday as "a definite must have".
