= Forget About It (film) =

2006 film by BJ Davis

- Movie poster
- Directed by: BJ Davis
- Screenplay by: Julian Davis
- Produced by: Anthony Falco; Kimberley Kates; Michael Manasseri; John D. Schofield
- Starring: Burt Reynolds; Robert Loggia; Charles Durning; Raquel Welch; Richard Grieco
- Cinematography: Mark Trengove
- Edited by: Stephen Eckelberry; Michael Manasseri
- Production companies: Big Screen Entertainment Group; The Rock Entertainment
- Release date: October 14, 2006
- Running time: 88 minutes

Forget About It is a 2006 American comedy film directed by BJ Davis starring Burt Reynolds, Robert Loggia, Charles Durning, Raquel Welch, Richard Grieco and Kimberley Kates.

== Plot ==
A trio of retired military servicemen find a suitcase of money near their Arizona trailer park. Little do they know it belongs to a mobster in the witness protection program. The old men's neighbor is played by Raquel Welch.

== Cast ==
=== Main ===
- Burt Reynolds as Sam LeFleur
- Robert Loggia as Carl Campobasso
- Charles Durning as Eddie O'Brien
- Raquel Welch as Christine DeLee
- Richard Grieco as Anthony Amato
- Kimberley Kates as Michelle Winchester
- Phil Amato as Vito
- Tim Thomerson as Arizona Al
- Phyllis Diller as Mrs. Hertzberg
- Michael Paloma as Peter Nitti / Don Antonio Giovanni
- David Zappone as Manuel Rios
- Wayne Crawford as Marshal Cimino
- Natalie Roth as Becky Rami
- Joanna Pacula as Talia Nitti
- Elena Sahagun as Connie Wang
- Byron Browne as Bodyguard

=== Supporting ===
- Barbara Barron as Biker Babe
- Towie Bixby as Newspaper Girl
- Will Bribiescas as Cop
- Christopher Eliot Bridges as Courthouse Husband
- Tori Bridges as FBI Agent
- James Brown as Strip Club Patron
- Anthony Casanova as Gangster
- Bryan Terrell Clark as Bodyguard (Credited as Bryan Clark)
- Dusty Dukatz as Mrs. Hertzberg's boy toy
- Timothy Gossman as US Marshal Agent
- Steve Gresser as Strip Club Patron
- Todd C. Guzze as Mobster
- Michael LeDesma as Eddie's Grandson
- Roderick LeDesma as Restaurant patron
- Lynn Melton as stripper in strip club
- Jennifer McLeod as Dinner Date
- Elena Muia as Bank girl
- Bruce Nelson as FBI Agent
- Anthony Perrego as Mobster
- Kevin Quick as Cab Driver
- Marc Alan Waugh as Police Officer
- Garriden Wolff as Man in Audience

=== Cameo/Uncredited ===
- Bob Huff as Airport Traveler
- Elaine Huff as Airport Traveler
- Mark Jacobson as Dinner Guest
- Alonso Parra as Casino Gambler
- Jennifer E. Rio as Waitress
- Scott Lee Scarborough as Club DJ
- Tatyana Ryan
- Gloria Ware

== Awards and nominations ==
Forget About It was screened at the New Jersey Film Festival in May 2006, where it won Best Film. It premiered in Waterbury, Connecticut and Phoenix, Arizona on October 27, 2006.

== Controversy ==
In 2008, Gregory Conley posted that he received legal warnings from BJ Davis and Julia Davis regarding a negative review of Forget About It. On January 14, Gregory posted that he'd received a Digital Millennium Copyright Act complaint from Julia Davis, and on January 14 posted an explanation attributed to Stephen Eckelberry of Big Screen Entertainment. There were some outraged posts made to websites such as Wired News and Techdirt.

== Release ==
Forget About It is owned by Big Screen Entertainment Group and was released January 8, 2008 in the United States by Allumination Filmworks.
