= Katie Downes =

English model

Katie Cook
- Born: Katie Elizabeth Downes; 16 May 1984 (age 42); Liverpool, England
- Occupation: Glamour model
- Height: 4 ft 11 in (1.50 m)
- Spouse: Jamie Cook (m. 2014)
- Children: 2

Katie Elizabeth Cook (born Downes; 16 May 1984) is a former English glamour model and Page 3 girl.

== Early life and career ==
She was born in Liverpool, England and attended De La Salle School, St. Helens. She has appeared in nearly all of the British lad mags and has been on the cover of Loaded, Maxim, Nuts, and Zoo Weekly. Nuts ranked her 11th sexiest on their list 50 Hottest Blondes of 2008.

She had a cameo appearance in the movie Deuce Bigalow: European Gigolo as a window washer in a wet white T-shirt. In the movie's special features, she is seen auditioning for the role against Page 3 models Michelle Marsh, Nicola Tappenden, and Nikkala Stott.

She appeared in the reality television series Poor Little Rich Girls on ITV, where for a week she swapped her life as model with a young woman named Michelle McManus who worked as a toilet cleaner.

== Personal life ==
She began dating the Arctic Monkeys guitarist Jamie Cook in 2006. They became engaged in 2012 and were married in May 2014.

== See also ==
- Lad culture
- The Sun newspaper
