= A Woman Like Me (film) =

- Film poster
- Directed by: Elizabeth Giamatti, Alex Sichel
- Written by: Alex Sichel, Melissa James Gibson
- Produced by: Elizabeth Giamatti, Alex Sichel, Christine Vachon
- Starring: Lili Taylor, Jonathan Cake, Maeve McGarth, Lynn Cohen, Clea Lewis, Frank Wood
- Edited by: Pola Rapaport, Ramsey Fendall
- Release dates: March 16, 2015 (SXSW); October 9, 2015
- Running time: 79 minutes
- Country: United States
- Language: English

A Woman Like Me is a 2015 documentary directed by Elizabeth Giamatti and Alex Sichel. It runs parallel to the real-life story of Sichel, who was diagnosed with terminal cancer in 2011. The fictional story of Anna Seashell, played by Lili Taylor, is of a woman who is given the same diagnosis. The documentary follows Alex as she uses narrative film to show her journey through terminal illness as it surrounds her and her families life.

== Synopsis ==
A Woman Like Me is a documentary about co-director Alex Sichel's navigation through having terminal breast cancer and how it has inspired her to try and embrace death as mentioned in Buddhist philosophy. The film is composed of home videos, one on one sit downs with Alex's family; husband, parents, sisters, doctors, and healers. Although a documentary, half of the movie shows Alex's current film project about Anna, a woman with the same diagnosis as Alex except she looks at the glass as half full. The film within the film recounts private conversations between Alex and her husband, Alex's dreams, and the alter-self, Anna, who is moving forward to face her fear of death. Sichel believes that making a movie about herself living with breast cancer can help her heal and accept what is happening to her.

The documentary side of the film shows Alex's doctor visits, the types of medications she is taking, and the alternative medicine healing practices she does with healers and shamans. Alex's family, although glad Alex is taking medicine from the "real" doctors, believe healers and the Buddhist philosophy of "going joyfully towards death" are not helpful and is just "magical thinking". Alex later learns that the tumor has grown larger so, she takes the opportunity to go to Greece and learn more about her family's history. The last scene of the film shows that Alex has lived another winter and is once again at the Buddhist silent retreat that she attends yearly. She mentions how her daughter's birthday is coming up so she needs to look forward with positive thoughts.

== Film festivals ==
- South by Southwest Film Festival on March 16, 2015
- Denver Film Festival on November 12, 2015
- San Francisco International LGBT Film Festival on June 20, 2015

== Awards ==
SXSW's Special Jury Prize for Directing
