= The Man (2005 film) =

- Theatrical poster
- Directed by: Les Mayfield
- Screenplay by: Jim Piddock; Margaret Oberman; Stephen Carpenter
- Story by: Jim Piddock; Margaret Oberman
- Produced by: Robert N. Fried
- Starring: Samuel L. Jackson; Eugene Levy; Miguel Ferrer; Luke Goss; Anthony Mackie; Susie Essman
- Cinematography: Adam Kane
- Edited by: Peter Fandetti; Jeffrey Wolf
- Music by: John Murphy
- Distributed by: New Line Cinema
- Release date: September 9, 2005
- Running time: 83 minutes
- Country: United States
- Language: English
- Budget: $20 million
- Box office: $10.3 million

The Man is a 2005 American buddy cop comedy film starring Samuel L. Jackson, Eugene Levy, and Miguel Ferrer.

The Man was directed by Les Mayfield and produced by Rob Fried, from a screenplay by Jim Piddock, Margaret Oberman and Stephen Carpenter, and based on a story by Piddock and Oberman. Filming took place in Toronto, Hamilton and Oakville, Ontario, Canada. New Line Cinema released The Man in the United States on September 9, 2005 to negative reviews from critics. The film was a box office bomb, grossing $10.3 million against a $20 million budget.

== Plot ==
In Detroit, a federal armory of the Bureau of Alcohol, Tobacco, Firearms and Explosives (ATF) is robbed of assault rifles, handguns and ammunition. An ATF agent was killed, and he and his partner Agent Derrick Vann are suspected to have been in on the robbery.

Vann, attempting to clear his name, sets up a buy. He is to go to a diner and reading a copy of the newspaper USA Today to be recognized. However, a man named Andy Fiddler is also there and has a copy of USA Today. Mistaking him for Vann, gun trafficker Joey "Kane" Trent hands Andy a paper bag with "his taste" in it and leaves. The bag contains a cell phone and a pistol, which Andy accidentally pulls out. A waitress thinks that Andy is there to rob the diner and panics. Vann arrests Andy, before realizing Joey's error. Joey calls the bag's phone and announces that he wants the man who he thinks is Vann to drop $20,000 in a certain trash can. Vann has the money, but now needs Andy to deliver it.

Due to the interference of a bystander, the location of the drop changes. Meanwhile, Andy tries to escape and Vann shoots after him, grazing him with a gunshot to the rear. Andy uses the phone to call the police for help, resulting in the capture of both of them by arriving squad cars. The police release Vann, but discover that there is a warrant for Andy. He reportedly purchased a stolen rug without knowing of its origins, but is still suspected of criminal activity.

Vann arranges Andy's release, to use him in his case against the traffickers. Vann tries to contact gun dealer Manny Cortez for help with the case, but finds Manny murdered in his own house. Vann then receives a call from his ex-wife Dara, who reminds him about the upcoming dance recital of their daughter Kate. He then receives another call from Joey, who now asks for $500,000 for the whole batch of weapons. Vann has Andy pose as a powerful trafficker for a meeting with Joey in a restaurant. Andy improvises by returning the phone to Joey and saying that their next meeting will be on his terms. Andy plans to use the next meeting to set up a trap for Joey. He then reminds Vann of Kate's recital, and both men attend it.

Andy and Vann arrange a meeting with Joey, but (against Andy's original plan) they fail to arrange backup from any law enforcement agency. Joey never met Vann before and asks who he is. Andy claims that Vann is someone who will do anything that they tell him. Vann admits this, and claims that he is betraying the service in pursuit of monetary gain. Joey is suitably convinced and agrees to work with him. Following the meeting, Andy and Vann part ways.

Andy is then captured by Internal Affairs agent Peters. Peters claims that Vann is corrupt, that he is actually trying to buy the guns for himself. He also believes that Vann murdered informant Hector "Booty" Babcock, Cortez and his own partner. Peters wants Andy to wear a wire and get a confession out of Vann. At ATF offices, Vann is suspended, and his boss Lt. Rita Carbone says that Andy was setting him up. Andy, now wired, visits Vann at his office. The two men drive to the exchange point to deliver the money. Vann suspects that Andy is wired and asks him about it. Andy admits it.

Vann and Andy enter the barn where the exchange is going to take place. This time, Joey is skeptical of their motives and pulls a gun on Vann. The law enforcement agents hear everything through the wire and arrive to arrest Joey. Andy disarms Joey, though Vann still receives a bullet wound in the buttocks. Vann delivers Andy to the airport for his flight back to Milwaukee and the two men say goodbye. Vann accidentally sets off the metal detectors in the airport and blames it on Andy. A protesting Andy is then led away by airport security for a body cavity search.

== Cast ==
- Samuel L. Jackson as ATF Agent Derrick Vann
- Eugene Levy as Andy Fiddler
- Luke Goss as Joey "Kane" Trent
- Miguel Ferrer as Agent Peters
- Susie Essman as Lt. Rita Carbone
- Anthony Mackie as Hector "Booty" Babcock
- Gigi Rice as Susan
- Rachael Crawford as Dara Vann
- Philip Akin as Second I.A. Agent
- Lindsay Ames as Waitress
- Randy Butcher as Precinct Cop
- Michael Cameron as IA driver
- Kevin Rushton as Thug
- Joe Sacco as Rookie Cop
- Tomorrow Baldwin Montgomery as Kate Vann
- Horatio Sanz as Santos
- Nestor Serrano as Manuel "Manny" Cortez
- Andrew Stelmack as Conventioneer
- Beatriz Yuste as Nun

== Production ==
In February 2004, it was announced New Line Cinema had greenlit The Man with Samuel L. Jackson and Eugene Levy set to star following two years of development.

== Reception ==
=== Box office ===
In its opening weekend, The Man earned $4,065,014 in 2,040 theaters. Altogether, the film was a box office bomb, only earning $8,330,720 in the United States and Canada and $12,382,362 worldwide. The DVD was released on January 10, 2006.

=== Critical response ===
The Man received negative reviews from critics, many of whom said that the plot made no sense and its jokes were rehashed. On Rotten Tomatoes, the film holds an approval rating of 12% based on 100 reviews. The site's consensus states: "Despite the steely presence of Samuel L. Jackson and the comic timing of Eugene Levy, The Man's plot is pointless and its jokes rehashed, as it ends up playing out like the Odd Couple with gas." Metacritic assigned the film a weighted average score of 33 out of 100, based on 27 critics, indicating "generally unfavorable reviews".

The film received a nomination for the Golden Raspberry Award for Worst Supporting Actor (Eugene Levy for this film and Cheaper by the Dozen 2). It also won the award for Less Than Dynamic Duo for Jackson and Levy at the 2005 Stinkers Bad Movie Awards.
