= Lawrence Guterman =

Canadian film director

- Born: Canada
- Other name: Larry Guterman
- Education: Harvard University, USC School of Cinematic Arts
- Occupations: Film director, producer, editor, television writer
- Years active: 1989–present
- Known for: Antz; Cats & Dogs; Son of the Mask

Lawrence Guterman is a Canadian film director. He directed the feature films Cats & Dogs (2001) and Son of the Mask (2005), as well as several episodes of Out of Jimmy's Head (between 2007 and 2008).

== Personal life ==
Guterman went back to school after working in animation and received a Master's degree in Film from the University of Southern California.

== Career ==
Guterman was raised in Montreal and Toronto, where he made his first short films in grade eight. After high school, Guterman went to the United States to attend MIT and then Harvard University, where he received a physics degree. Guterman would return to Canada every summer to study animation at Sheridan College of Art. He created illustrations for the Harvard Lampoon. His interest in film-making was renewed after completing a 15-minute documentary for one of his courses at Harvard.

After university, he moved to Los Angeles and worked on computer graphics and as a script reader for Columbia Pictures. While in Los Angeles, Guterman attended USC School of Cinematic Arts to expand his film knowledge. While there, he sold two feature-length scripts to major film studios and co-wrote a script for the Tales from the Crypt series. The latter caught the attention of Robert Zemeckis and HBO.

He directed and co-wrote the short, Headless!, which earned positive reviews at USC's First Look Film Festival and won the Grand Jury Prize at Worldfest in Huston. Guterman took his first role as director when he worked on a video game based on the Goosebumps series for DreamWorks Interactive after Steven Spielberg saw his short "Headless!". He was then offered to direct several sequences for the animated film Antz (1998) for DreamWorks Animation.

In the early 2000s Guterman made his feature film directorial debut with Warner Bros.' Cats & Dogs (2001), which earned $201 million in worldwide box office revenue, followed by Son of the Mask (2005). He is an executive producer of Remember (2015), starring Christopher Plummer and Martin Landau and directed by Atom Egoyan.

In 2018, Larry Guterman was named one of Fast Company's 100 Most Creative People.

== Filmography ==
Short film

- Headless! (1990)

Feature film

- Cats & Dogs (2001)
- Son of the Mask (2005)

Video game

- Goosebumps: Escape from Horrorland (1996)

Television

Year	Title	Notes
2008	Out of Jimmy's Head	Episode "Out of Jimmy's Body"
2011	Mongo Wrestling Alliance	3 episodes
TBA	T & G	TV movie

Other credits

Year	Title	Role
1994	Girth of a Nation	Editor
1998	Antz	Director of additional sequences
2009	The Pawfect Plan	Special thanks
2015	Remember	Executive producer
