= David Garrett (screenwriter) =

American filmmaker

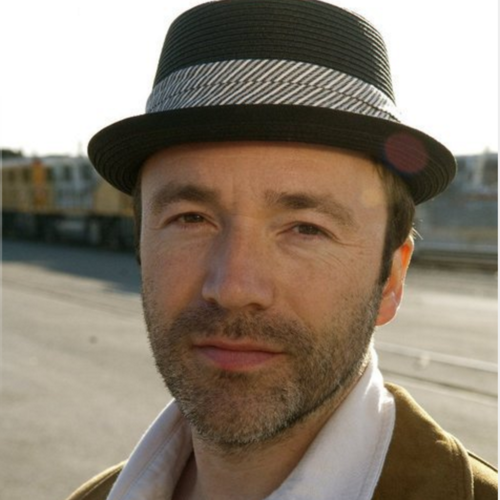
David Garrett

David Garrett is an American filmmaker best known for directing and producing the feature-length documentary film Who Is Alvin Greene? following South Carolina's unlikely Democratic nominee for the U.S. Senate Alvin Greene on the 2010 campaign trail. The film is co-directed and co-produced by Leslie Beaumont. Garrett also co-wrote the 2005 comedy film Deuce Bigalow: European Gigolo and the 2001 comedy Corky Romano

The Warner Brothers television series "Living with Fran", which Garrett co-created with Jamie Kennedy, was based upon Garrett's life story.

Garrett inked a one-year development deal with Fox Television in the early days of the internet when iFilm aired his short film Sunday's Game. Thereafter, Garrett wrote, produced and acted in over 100 films and television series, including Cabin Girl, Neighborhood Watch, The Threesome, Crescent City, DIY or Die, Oscar Shaw and Portal in the Pines.

In 2025, Garrett played Pastor Hobson in the action feature film Oscar Shaw alongside Michael Jai White. He also played Janitor Markus in the sci-fi feature film Portal in the Pines alongside Jamie Kennedy.
