= Son of the Mask =

2005 film by Lawrence Guterman

- Theatrical release poster
- Directed by: Lawrence Guterman
- Written by: Lance Khazei
- Based on: The Mask by: Mike Richardson; John Arcudi; Chris Warner; Doug Mahnke
- Produced by: Erica Huggins; Scott Kroopf
- Starring: Jamie Kennedy; Alan Cumming; Traylor Howard; Steven Wright; Kal Penn; Bob Hoskins
- Cinematography: Greg Gardiner
- Edited by: Malcolm Campbell; John Coniglio; Debra Neil-Fisher
- Music by: Randy Edelman
- Production companies: Radar Pictures; Dark Horse Entertainment
- Distributed by: New Line Cinema
- Release date: February 18, 2005 (United States)
- Running time: 94 minutes
- Countries: United States; Germany
- Language: English
- Budget: $84–100 million
- Box office: $59.9 million

Son of the Mask is a 2005 comedy film directed by Lawrence Guterman. A sequel to The Mask (1994), it is the second installment in The Mask franchise, which is based on the comic book series of the same name published by Dark Horse Comics. The film stars Jamie Kennedy as Tim Avery, an aspiring animator whose child is born with the powers of the Mask of Loki. The supporting cast includes Alan Cumming as Loki, who is ordered by Odin to recover the Mask, alongside Traylor Howard, Kal Penn, Steven Wright, Bob Hoskins as Odin and Ryan and Liam Falconer as Tim's son, Alvey. Ben Stein additionally appears in a brief role as Doctor Arthur Neuman from the original film.

Plans for a sequel began as early as 1996, when an issue of Nintendo Power featured a promotional contest related to a proposed second film. However, the project stalled after Jim Carrey declined to reprise his role due to his negative experience making Ace Ventura: When Nature Calls. Development resumed in 2001 with Kennedy cast in the lead role, and principal photography took place in Sydney, Australia, from November 2003 to April 2004. The film would suffer several delays before release.

Son of the Mask was released in the United States by New Line Cinema on February 18, 2005. Unlike its predecessor, the film was a critical and commercial failure, grossing $59.9 million against an $84–100 million budget and making it a significant box-office bomb. Critics panned its screenplay, visual effects, humor, absence of Jim Carrey as well as Jamie Kennedy's performance, and content considered inappropriate for its PG rating. It has since been regarded as one of the worst films ever made and among the worst sequels ever produced. The film was nominated for seven Razzies at the 26th Golden Raspberry Awards including Worst Picture, winning Worst Prequel or Sequel.

== Plot ==
More than a decade following the defeat of Dorian Tyrell, (Note: As depicted in the The Mask (1994).) Doctor Arthur Neuman is giving a tour of the hall of Norse mythology in Edge City's local museum. Neuman mentions that Loki, the God of Mischief, created the Mask of Loki and unleashed it on Earth to spread chaos among humankind and that those who wear it are granted his powers. When Neuman mentions Loki's imprisonment at the hands of his father Odin, a stranger becomes furious and transforms, revealing himself to be Loki. The tourists panic and flee, but Neuman stays to argue with Loki, who takes the mask in the display case, only to discover that it is a replica.

In Fringe City, the real mask is found in a river by a dog named Otis, who belongs to Tim Avery. An aspiring animator, Tim is reluctant to accept parenthood with his wife Tonya. Meanwhile, Loki is reminded by Odin to resume the search for the mask he has sent him on, believing it has caused too much chaos for the mortal world, while expecting his son to take responsibility for his actions.

Tim dons the mask for a Halloween party held at the animation studio he works at and becomes the reincarnation of "The Mask". When the party turns out to be a bore, Tim uses his newfound powers to invigorate the event and give his boss Daniel Moss the inspiration for a new cartoon. Their new son Alvey is conceived and born with the mask's power, which alerts Odin, who then informs Loki and tells him that if he finds the child, he will find the mask.

Months later, Tonya goes on a business trip, leaving Tim with Alvey. Now promoted, Tim desperately tries to work on his cartoon at home but is continuously disrupted by his son. To get some peace and quiet, he lets Alvey watch various cartoons on television, which inspires Alvey to torment his father using his powers. Otis, who has been feeling neglected by Tim, accidentally dons the mask, gains its power and tries to get rid of Alvey, but his attempts are foiled by the craftier infant.

Loki eventually finds Alvey and confronts Tim for the mask, but Alvey uses his powers to protect his father. Odin, finally had enough of Loki as he possesses Tim, scolds his destructive approach and strips him of his powers. Tim is later dismissed after failing to impress Moss during a pitch but reconciles and bonds with Alvey. Loki, determined to warmly pleasure his father, sneaks into the Avery house and completes a summoning ritual and appeals to Odin to restore his powers. Odin agrees, but only for a limited time, deeming this as his last chance.

Loki kidnaps Alvey in exchange for the mask. Tonya returns home and goes with Tim and Otis, to whom Tim had apologized for his negligence, to make the exchange. Loki, impressed by his powers of the mask and growing fond of him, decides to keep Alvey despite the exchange, forcing the group to chase after him as Tim becomes the Mask once more. The subsequent confrontation is evenly matched, prompting Loki to halt the fight, suggesting they let Alvey decide who to be with. Although Loki tries to lure Alvey to him with promises of fun, Tim removes the mask and convinces his son to choose him. Enraged, Loki tries to murder Tim, but his time runs out at the last minute as Odin appears in person and scolds Loki for his failure. Tim, however, feels sympathy for Loki and reminds Odin that regardless of their problems, they will still be family. After Tim gives them the mask, Odin reconciles with Loki and the duo return home.

Some time later, Tim is rehired when his subsequent cartoon based on Alvey and Otis competing for his attention becomes a success. After the Averys watch the cartoon's premiere, Tonya reveals that she is pregnant again.

== Cast ==
- Jamie Kennedy as Tim Avery / The Mask, an aspiring cartoonist who ends up in possession of the Mask of Loki.
- Alan Cumming as Loki, the God of Mischief in Norse mythology who has now been sent out to recover his creation.
- Traylor Howard as Tonya Avery, Tim's wife.
- Steven Wright as Daniel Moss, Tim's boss.
- Kal Penn as Jorge, Tim's best friend.
- Bob Hoskins as Odin, the All-Father of the Gods in Norse mythology and Loki's father.
  - Esosa Edmonds additionally portrays one of the character's guises, a burly and female traffic officer.
- Ben Stein as Doctor Arthur Neuman, the only character to appear in both films where he appears as a tour guide at Edge City's local museum in the film's prologue.
- Magda Szubanski as Betty, the Averys' neighbor.
- Sandy Winton as Chris, Clare's husband.
- Rebecca Massey as Clare, Chris's wife.
- Issac Longmuir, Tayzin Fahey-Leigh, Skyla Laginha, Lochie Nazer-Hennings and Andie Rogers as Chris and Clare's children
- Ryan Johnson as Chad
- Victoria Thaine as Sylvia
- Peter Flett as Mr. Kemperbee
- Amanda Smyth as Heather Babcock
- Ryan and Liam Falconer as Alvey Avery, Tim and Tonya's infantile son who inherits the Mask of Loki's power from his father.
  - Joyce Kurtz, Mona Marshall and Mary Matilyn Mouser additionally provided the character's vocal effects
  - Neil Ross additionally provided a deep voice that the character utilizes
- Alyssa McClelland and Trilby Glover as nurses in a fantasy that Tim has
- Bear the Dog as Otis, the Averys' Jack Russell Terrier.
  - Bill Farmer and Richard Steven Horvitz additionally provided the vocal effects of the character's masked persona
- Raj Ryan as Doctor Hamada.
- Michael Denkha, Simon Maiden, Adam Moulds, Dorian Nkono and Ling-Hsueh Tang as some animators
- Josephine Chu, Solomon Freer and Ethan Coker as some museum patrons from the film's prologue
- Jerry Minor as a shopkeeper who sells "authentic Pakistan-made Norse mythology masks" and later gets possessed by Odin.
- Jeanette Cronin as a housewife
- V2 as Venus, Otis' love interest.

== Production ==
=== Development ===
After the release of The Mask, Nintendo Power announced that Jim Carrey would be returning in a sequel called The Mask II. The magazine held a contest where the first prize would be awarded a walk-on role in the film. Chuck Russell, who directed the original film, expressed his interest in a Mask sequel in his 1996 Laserdisc commentary. He was hoping Carrey would come back as the title character, along with Amy Yasbeck, who played reporter Peggy Brandt in the original. Russell decided to cut scenes when Peggy dies and leave the character open for the sequel. In a 1995 Barbara Walters Special, Carrey revealed that he was offered $10 million to star in The Mask II. Carrey turned it down, because his experiences on Ace Ventura: When Nature Calls convinced him that reprising a character he had previously played offered him no challenges as an actor. Due to Carrey declining to reprise his role, the project never came to fruition, and the concept for the sequel was completely changed. The winner of the failed contest was given $5,000 and other prizes as compensation and was issued an apology in the final issue of Nintendo Power in 2012.

=== Pre-production ===
In 2001, it was reported that Lance Khazei was asked by New Line Cinema to do the script for a sequel to The Mask. Addressing the differences between the sequel and the original film, director Lawrence Guterman compared it to the differences between Alien and Aliens, stating that, "Son of the Mask is a completely different story." Jack Black, Chris Rock, Breckin Meyer, Will Ferrell, Owen Wilson, Marlon Wayans, Seann William Scott, Steve Carell, and Ryan Reynolds were initially offered the role of Tim Avery, but all have turned it down, with the latter already committed to Blade: Trinity at the time. Ben Stein reprises his role as Dr. Arthur Neuman from the original film, re-establishing the relationship between the mask and its creator, Loki. He is the only actor to appear in both films as well as in The Mask cartoon series. The dog's name, Otis, connects with the dog from the original film and comic book, Milo, as a reference to The Adventures of Milo and Otis. The naming of the Avery family pays homage to Tex Avery as its patriarch and the film's protagonist, Tim Avery, wants to be a cartoonist.

Jamie Kennedy was offered the lead role after a couple of other projects he was to make with Warner Bros.'s own television unit did not go into production. He had initially turned down the offer to star due to scheduling conflicts with his television series The Jamie Kennedy Experiment. Both the studio and network managed to work his schedule and he was signed. However, Kennedy was once again hesitant due to Tim only having minuscule time as the Mask and considered instead playing the role of Loki due to the versatile nature of the character. A chance encounter with Jim Carrey convinced him to take the role as well as talks with the director and producers who pitched the film as a romantic-comedy of a simple man going through relatable circumstances as a newly married man and sudden father. Kennedy stated that he was also impressed with the special effects and hoped that the film would at least succeed in that aspect.

=== Filming ===
Principal photography began on November 24, 2003 and wrapped on April 3, 2004. The film had a budget of $84–100 million, and was primarily shot at Fox Studios Australia in Sydney. Additional on-location shots were filmed in various suburbs: Woolloomooloo, Leichhardt, Burwood and the Northern Beaches and Sydney Eye Hospital. The façade of Tim Avery’s home was purpose built on the tennis courts at Appian Way in Burwood and the party scene was filmed at Wellings estate. Kennedy stated that filming was exhausting, primarily due to the Falconer twins and Bear the dog's constant maintenance. This combined with the heavy deadline and constant on-set rewrites made it difficult to determine how the film would turn out. Its delayed filming caused its distributor New Line to delay its potential Summer 2004 release to an October 15, 2004 release and then eventually delaying it to February 18, 2005.

=== Post-production ===
Industrial Light & Magic (ILM) and Tippett Studio created the visual effects. In contrast to the first film, which was inspired by the works of Tex Avery, and comparing the live-action animation-hybrid techniques of both Who Framed Roger Rabbit and Space Jam, the animators for Son of the Mask drew from the style of Chuck Jones. ILM shared technology it developed for the computer-generated infant in Lemony Snicket's A Series of Unfortunate Events. Kurtz & Friends provided digital paint for the 2D animation segments.

The original cut was roughly two hours long and went through minor changes before getting screened for executives. Kennedy claimed that this version was much more accessible and had "scope and tones"; praising Guterman's attention to detail. However, the film was deemed "not funny" and was demanded to have thirty-eight minutes cut from the film. This resulted in what Kennedy described as an "ADHD clusterfuck" with numerous VFX-based scenes added that focused on Alvey and Otis.

== Music ==
The musical score was composed by Randy Edelman, who also composed the first film. The film contained the extended version of Kennedy's cover of the 1967 hit single "Can't Take My Eyes Off You" by Frankie Valli, which in the film had various musical genre styles. The soundtrack was released by New Line Records on February 8, 2005. For its Japanese release, the theme song is "Kamen (仮面)" (lit. 'Mask') by Tackey & Tsubasa.

== Release ==
=== Theatrical ===
The film was originally scheduled for a Summer 2004 release in the United States by New Line Cinema, but was delayed to October 15, 2004, before eventually being pushed to February 18, 2005. The studio paid $20 million of that for the North America distribution rights while international partners paid the rest, as it was expected to do well in its home media release.

=== Home media ===
Son of the Mask was released on VHS and DVD on May 17, 2005. On April 23, 2012, the film was released on Blu-ray by Warner Home Video.

== Reception ==
=== Box office ===
The film opened on February 18, 2005, earning 4th place with $7.7 million during its Presidents' Day weekend behind three other newcomers, Hitch, Constantine, and Because of Winn-Dixie. In its release in Germany on March 10, 2005, the film opened earned 13th place with $227,064. In total, it earned $17 million domestically in North America, $524,093 in Germany and $42.9 million internationally, earning back $59.9 million worldwide of its $84–$100 million budget, making it a box-office failure, especially when compared to its predecessor's successful box office gross of $351.6 million against its $18–23 million budget ten years prior.

=== Critical response ===
Reviews for Son of the Mask were overwhelmingly negative. On the review aggregator website Rotten Tomatoes, 6% of 104 critics' reviews are positive, with an average rating of 3/10. The website's consensus reads: "Overly frantic, painfully unfunny, and sorely missing the presence of Jim Carrey." Metacritic, which uses a weighted average, assigned the film a score of 20 out of 100, based on 26 critics, indicating "generally unfavorable" reviews. Audiences polled by CinemaScore gave the film an average grade of "B−" on an A+ to F scale.

In his review Richard Roeper stated, "In the five years I've been co-hosting this show, this is the closest I've ever come to walking out halfway through the film, and now that I look back on the experience, I wish I had." Roger Ebert gave the film 1.5 stars and stated, "What we basically have here is a license for the filmmakers to do whatever they want to do with the special effects, while the plot, like Wile E. Coyote, keeps running into the wall." He later named it the fifth-worst film of 2005. On their television show, Ebert & Roeper, they gave the film "Two Thumbs Down". Nell Minow of Common Sense Media gave the film 1/5 stars, writing: "This movie is dumb and loud, which some kids will confuse with entertaining, but others will just find it overwhelming."

Jim Schembri of The Sydney Morning Herald was more positive, writing that the film was "a bright, fast, kiddie-oriented lark with US TV comic Jamie Kennedy doing well as the beneficiary of the magical mask that turns anyone who wears it into a dazzling display of computer-animated effects."

=== Accolades ===
In 2006, Son of the Mask was the most nominated film at the Golden Raspberry Awards with eight, winning for Worst Remake or Sequel, and won several Stinkers Bad Movie Awards, including Worst Actor (Jamie Kennedy), Worst Sequel, and Worst Couple. In a 2007 countdown of the 94 "worst to best" comic book to film adaptations, Rotten Tomatoes listed the film 94th.

Award	Category	Recipient	Result
Golden Schmoes Awards	Worst Movie of the Year		Won
Golden Raspberry Awards	Worst Picture		Nominated
Golden Raspberry Awards	Worst Director	Lawrence Guterman	Nominated
Golden Raspberry Awards	Worst Actor	Jamie Kennedy	Nominated
Golden Raspberry Awards	Worst Supporting Actor	Alan Cumming	Nominated
Golden Raspberry Awards	Worst Supporting Actor	Bob Hoskins	Nominated
Golden Raspberry Awards	Worst Screenplay	Lance Khazei	Nominated
Golden Raspberry Awards	Worst Screen Couple	Jamie Kennedy and "anybody stuck sharing the screen with him"	Nominated
Golden Raspberry Awards	Worst Prequel or Sequel		Won
Stinkers Bad Movie Awards	Worst Picture	Erica Huggins and Scott Kroopf	Nominated
Stinkers Bad Movie Awards	Worst Actor	Jamie Kennedy	Won
Stinkers Bad Movie Awards	Most Intrusive Musical Score	Randy Edelman	Won
Stinkers Bad Movie Awards	Worst Song or Song Performance in a Film or Its End Credits	"Can't Take My Eyes Off You" by Jamie Kennedy	Nominated
Stinkers Bad Movie Awards	Worst On-Screen Couple	Jamie Kennedy and anyone forced to co-star with him	Won
Stinkers Bad Movie Awards	Most Annoying Fake Accent (Male)	Kal Penn	Nominated
Stinkers Bad Movie Awards	Most Painfully Unfunny Comedy		Nominated
Stinkers Bad Movie Awards	Worst Sequel		Won
Stinkers Bad Movie Awards	Foulest Family Film		Won
Stinkers Bad Movie Awards	Least "Special" Special Effects		Nominated

=== Legacy ===
Rotten Tomatoes considered the film as the 33rd worst sequel on its "56 Worst Sequels of All Time" list. In 2024, Collider's Jeremy Urquhart's list of the "30 Worst Movies of All Time" would rank Son of the Mask as the 23rd worst film.

The poor reception of Son of the Mask inspired Jamie Kennedy to co-create the 2007 documentary film Heckler, an examination of hecklers and professional critics. Starting in 2021, Kennedy released a series of in-depth videos on his YouTube channel about his experience making the film.

== Video game ==
A video game based on the movie of the same name released for mobile phones on February 10, 2005. The game was published and developed by Indiagames.

== Future ==
=== Possible sequel ===
On the possibility of a third film, Mike Richardson stated in 2014, "We've been talking about reviving The Mask, both in film and in comics. We've had a couple of false starts." In December 2024, Jim Carrey revealed that he was still interested in portraying the Mask in a sequel depending on the idea used. In January 2025, Diaz also expressed interest in returning "if Jim's on board". In June 2026, Russell was on board to direct and stated, "A sequel to The Mask is always something I'm asked about. It'd be lovely to return, but for me with Jim in particular, it would be lovely to return, but we'll see. It's not ready yet, but that's a lovely idea." A month later however, Russell died at his home at the age of 74, in the San Diego Area, leaving the status of the sequel unknown.

=== Reboot ===
In July 2026, Evil Dead Burn director Sébastien Vaniček expressed interest in directing a new adaptation that was darker and more violent, staying closer in tone to the original comics.

== See also ==
- List of 21st-century films considered the worst
- List of films based on Dark Horse Comics
- List of films set around Halloween
- List of live-action films based on cartoons and comics
