= Charades (film) =

1998 film by Stephen Eckelberry

- DVD cover
- Directed by: Stephen Eckelberry
- Written by: Richmond Riedel; Karen Black
- Produced by: Karen Black; Paul Williams; Richard Hillman, Sr.
- Starring: Erika Eleniak; C. Thomas Howell; Kimberley Kates; Jack Scalia; Karen Black; James Russo
- Cinematography: Susan Helen Emerson
- Edited by: Fima Noveck
- Music by: S.P. Somtow
- Release date: December 17, 1998
- Running time: 94 minutes
- Country: United States
- Language: English

Charades (also known as Felons or First Degree) is a 1998 mystery drama film directed by Stephen Eckelberry. The film stars Erika Eleniak, C. Thomas Howell, and Karen Black, who was a writer and producer on the film.

== Plot ==
Barry (Jack Scalia) works at the shipping department of a high-tech company called Technoworks. One day, he is invited to a barbecue at his boss's house (Wilder). At the party, the guests play a demented version of charades. Other strange things happen: the next door neighbor (James Russo) screams racial slurs over the fence, and the widow of the ex-owner of Technoworks arrives. As a result, we learn of a kidnapping scheme gone awry, a fight ensues, and the pieces of the puzzle start to come together to reveal who kidnapped and killed the former Technoworks boss, and why Barry was invited to the party.

== Cast ==
- Erika Eleniak as Monica
- James Wilder as Quinn
- C. Thomas Howell as Evan
- Kimberley Kates as Laura
- Jack Scalia as Barry
- Karen Black as Jude
- James Russo as Max Targenville

== Release ==
The film was first released to video on December 17, 1998 in Iceland. The next year, the film premiered at the Austin Film Festival. In 1999, it was released to video in Germany and Japan.

== Reception ==
VideoHound's Golden Movie Retriever gave the film a 2-star rating, as did Robert Pardi of TV Guide, who described the screenplay as "Neil LaBute-for-beginners". Video Store magazine said the film's plot had the potential to be "intriguing" but "never really gets off the ground", with violence and sex scenes its most likely appeal for potential renters. Merle Bertrand of Film Threat said the film "isn't half as clever as it thinks it is" and had "all the prerequisites for a straight to video release. Lots of gun play. Abundant boobage. B Movie staples .... "
