= Poor Little Rich Girls =

- Country of origin: United Kingdom
- No. of episodes: 6

Production
- Producer: Helen Royle
- Running time: 60 minutes

Original release
- Network: ITV
- Release: 25 May 2004

Poor Little Rich Girls is a United Kingdom reality television program that allowed women from very different professions and classes to switch places to see how the other half lives. The six-part series, directed by Iain Thompson and produced by Simon Kerfoot and Helen Royle, first aired in 2004 on ITV.

== Premise ==
During the two-week taping of each show, the women not only take on one another's jobs, but also inhabit each other's homes and cut off all contact with their own friends and family. Episodes included a swap between DJ and model Sassy Porter and cleaning woman Leanne Rodrigues, who was subsequently offered a modeling career of her own, and between model Katie Downes and toilet cleaner Michelle McManus.

== See also ==
- Wife Swap
