= Deuce Bigalow: European Gigolo =

2005 American sex comedy film by Mike Bigelow

- Theatrical release poster
- Directed by: Mike Bigelow
- Screenplay by: Rob Schneider; David Garrett; Jason Ward
- Story by: Rob Schneider
- Based on: Characters by: Harris Goldberg; Rob Schneider
- Produced by: Jack Giarraputo; Adam Sandler; John Schneider
- Starring: Rob Schneider; Eddie Griffin; Til Schweiger; Jeroen Krabbé
- Cinematography: Marc Felperlaan
- Edited by: Peck Prior; Sandy Solowitz
- Music by: James L. Venable
- Production companies: Columbia Pictures; Happy Madison Productions
- Distributed by: Sony Pictures Releasing
- Release date: August 12, 2005
- Running time: 83 minutes
- Country: United States
- Language: English
- Budget: $22 million
- Box office: $45.3 million

Deuce Bigalow: European Gigolo is a 2005 American crime sex comedy film directed by Mike Bigelow (in his feature length directorial debut) from a screenplay by Rob Schneider, David Garrett, and Jason Ward. The film is the sequel to Deuce Bigalow: Male Gigolo (1999) and stars Schneider (reprising his role from the first film), Eddie Griffin, Til Schweiger, and Jeroen Krabbé. The plot involves male prostitute Deuce Bigalow visiting his former pimp T.J. in Amsterdam, and looking for a murderer who is killing the greatest "man-whores" of Europe.

Deuce Bigalow: European Gigolo was released in the United States on August 12, 2005, by Sony Pictures Releasing through the Columbia Pictures label. The film received negative reviews for its crude humor, lack of originality and poor execution and earned less money than its predecessor, grossing over $45 million worldwide against a $22 million budget. It was also nominated for Worst Picture at the 26th Golden Raspberry Awards, while Schneider won Worst Actor.

== Plot ==
Former gigolo Deuce Bigalow, recently widowed after his wife Kate is killed in a shark attack, is invited by his former pimp T.J. to Amsterdam. There, he learns that European gigolos are being murdered by a "Man-whore Killer" with T.J.'s employee Lil' Kim quitting to avoid being killed.

Deuce finds German gigolo Heinz Hummer asleep in an alley behind a coffee shop; believing he is high, Deuce takes him to T.J.'s boat. After realizing Hummer is dead, T.J. prepares to dump the body in the river but decides to confirm Hummer's reputation of being well-endowed by examining Hummer's penis; T.J. is photographed during the act and becomes the primary homicide suspect. Deuce is apprehended and interviewed by Gaspar Voorsboch, a police inspector.

When Deuce is released, T.J., now in disguise, convinces Deuce to find the killer by becoming a gigolo again. Former gigolo Antoine gives Deuce a client list but is murdered; T.J. is again photographed at the scene. Deuce and T.J. visit the first client on the list, and while Deuce distracts the woman, T.J. discovers lipstick that matches the kind found on the dead gigolos. Deuce gives Gaspar the lipstick, who dismisses it.

Deuce meets Gaspar's niece, Eva, who suffers from extreme obsessive–compulsive disorder. Deuce continues to investigate different women from Antoine's list including Lily, who speaks through an electrolarynx after a laryngectomy, and Svetlana, who has a penis for a nose after being raised in Chernobyl. Deuce and T.J. infiltrate the European gigolo office, where the Man-whore Killer murders another gigolo; T.J. is arrested when he is caught at the scene again.

Deuce visits Eva's apartment and discovers items used by the Man-whore Killer. Deuce confides his suspicions to Gaspar but is again dismissed. However, Gaspar reveals to Eva that he is the Man-whore Killer; he locks her up and prepares to frame her. An unsuspecting Deuce then rides with Gaspar to the "Man-Whore Awards" ceremony under the guise of protecting the gigolos.

Eva escapes and tries to warn Deuce. However, Gaspar holds Deuce at gunpoint and reveals he was once a hopeful gigolo who was humiliated when another gigolo had sex with his fiancé; Gaspar was so distraught he accidentally injured himself with a penis pump. Gaspar reveals that he plans to kill all the European gigolos with a bomb.

Deuce evacuates the building and engages in a sword fight with Gaspar, during which he mentions non-sexual romantic ways of pleasing a woman; his words move the crowd. Gaspar defeats Deuce, but before he can detonate the bomb, Lily and Svetlana distract Gaspar; Deuce gains control of the detonator and is awarded the "Golden Boner" for his bravery. When he kisses Eva, Deuce accidentally sets off the bomb, but no one is injured. Deuce and Eva pick up a newly freed T.J., who tells them that he is entering a brand-new market: homosexual prostitution.

A post-script reveals that T.J. stops gay man-whoring and becomes a rapper called MC Extra Nipple where he didn't make any records and was shot several times. Deuce and Eva got married where they are expecting twin gigolos. Gaspar became a gigolo in prison against his will. Lil' Kim had a penis enlargement which is now 4 inches wide. Svetlana marries a man with a vagina for a face where everyone vomited uncontrollably. Kate's prosthetic leg is turned into a bong by an old Dutch woman.

== Cast ==
- Rob Schneider as Deuce Bigalow, an American gigolo.
- Eddie Griffin as T.J. Hicks, Deuce's pimp friend.
- Hanna Verboom as Eva, a woman with obsessive-compulsive disorder, one of Deuce's clients, and later his girlfriend.
- Jeroen Krabbé as Gaspar Voorsboch, a corrupt and vengeful Royal Marechaussee inspector and Deuce's nemesis.
- Til Schweiger as Heinz Hummer, a legendary gigolo from Germany, known for being the most well-endowed gigolo in Amsterdam and one of the victims of Man-Whore Killer
- Douglas Sills as Chadsworth Buckingham III, a gigolo and the head of Royal Order of European Man Whores.
- Carlos Ponce as Rodrigo Bollas De Madera, the Spanish gigolo and one of the victims of Man-Whore Killer.
- Charles Keating as Gian-Carlo, an arrogant and old school gigolo and Heinz Hummer's nemesis.
- Rachel Stevens as Louisa, a dirty girl who is one of Deuce's clients.
- Alex Dimitriades as Enzo Giarraputo, the Italian gigolo.
- Kostas Sommer as Assapopoulos Borealis, the Greek gigolo.
- Miranda Raison as Svetlana Revenko, one of Deuce's clients from Chernobyl, Ukraine who has a penis for a nose that she covers with a veil.
- Oded Fehr as Antoine Laconte, the Argentinian gigolo and old enemy of Chuck from the first film who provides Deuce with some information and later becomes one of the victims of Man-Whore Killer.
- Tony Fish as Lil' Kim, a former worker of T.J. who quit amidst the gigolo murders
- Zoe Telford as Lily
- Vincent Martella as Billy
- Heather Anne Campbell as Newscaster
- Bobbi Sue Luther as Newscaster
- Pilar Schneider as Woman at Airport
- Dana Goodman as Greta, a hunchback girl who is one of Deuce's clients.
- Skytriss as Sherrie Kane
- Julia Lea Wolov as the Big-Eared Girl who is one of Deuce's clients.
- Kelly Brook as a woman in a painting
- Daan Schuurmans as Zucchini Gigolo
- Alex Zane as Man-Whore Awards reporter
- Johnny Vaughan as the host of the Man-Whore Awards.
- John Farley as a Naked Bike Cop
- Fred Armisen as a Frenchman smoking at the aquarium (uncredited)
- Arija Bareikis as Kate (uncredited), a woman with a prosthetic leg and Deuce's wife who was killed by a shark
- Norm Macdonald as Earl McManus (uncredited). The postscript made a mentioning that Norm Macdonald still wishes that he had his own sitcom.
- Adam Sandler as Javier Sandooski (uncredited)

The film also includes cameos by Elisabetta Canalis as a castle lady and Dutch actress Chantal Janzen as a Scandinavian porn star. Wes Takahashi, former animator and visual effects supervisor for Industrial Light & Magic, makes a cameo appearance as a news reporter, and Katie Downes appears as a window cleaner lady.

== Production ==
Disney declined to produce the sequel through their Touchstone Pictures label, deeming it inappropriate for a PG-13 rating, as they aimed to avoid the R rating of the original film. Consequently, the film was picked up by Sony Pictures, which retained the distribution rights. Disney, however, retained 5% of the film's box office gross. To promote the film, Sony organized a "Man-Whore of the Year" contest in collaboration with Maxim, held in Las Vegas.

Eddie Griffin verified in an interview that "a really old stuffed cat" was used during the scene where T.J. Hicks is attacked by a cat.

== Reception ==
=== Box office ===
The film earned $9.6 million on its opening weekend and debuted in 3,127 theaters. The film grossed $22.4 million in North America and $22.9 million in international markets, grossing $45.3 million worldwide.

=== Critical response ===
On Rotten Tomatoes, Deuce Bigalow: European Gigolo has an approval rating of 9% based on reviews from 98 critics, with an average rating of 3.60/10. The site's consensus states: "A witless follow-up to the surprise 1999 hit, Deuce Bigalow: European Gigolo is raunchy, politically incorrect, and not particularly funny." On Metacritic the film has a score of 23% based on reviews from 25 critics, indicating "generally unfavorable" reviews. Audiences surveyed by CinemaScore gave the film a grade C+.

Michael Rechtshaffen of The Hollywood Reporter wrote: "Every bit as vulgar, sophomoric and thoroughly tasteless as 1999's Deuce Bigalow: Male Gigolo. But what is most annoying is the sequel's capability of inducing laughter even as one hates oneself for so easily succumbing to the total silliness of it all." Robert Koehler of Variety called it "Rude, crude and, uh, cosmopolitan, Deuce Bigalow: European Gigolo waves the flag for R-rated politically incorrect studio comedy but doesn't top the laugh ratio of the first Deuce misadventure."

Roger Ebert gave the film a rare "zero star" rating, calling it "aggressively bad, as if it wants to cause suffering to the audience", and describing it as "completely beneath contempt" on his show Ebert & Roeper. He ranked it as the worst film of 2005, and ultimately included the movie in his most hated films list. Also on Ebert & Roeper, Richard Roeper called the film "the cinematic equivalent of a bunch of 13-year-old boys in a locker room repeating dirty phrases they've just learned" and "dead on arrival."

Ebert also chastised Rob Schneider for his overly zealous defense of the series, referring to an incident in which Los Angeles Times critic Patrick Goldstein called Schneider a "third-rate comic." Schneider responded by calling Goldstein a "third-rate, unfunny pompous reporter" in a full-page open letter published in Variety and The Hollywood Reporter. Schneider further claimed that Goldstein was unqualified to review the film since he was not a Pulitzer Prize-winning journalist. Ebert, having won the Pulitzer Prize for Criticism in 1975, took it upon himself to criticize Schneider in his own review: "Speaking in my official capacity as a Pulitzer Prize winner, Mr. Schneider, your movie sucks." The quote "your movie sucks" would later become the title of a book published by Ebert compiling reviews of films he had awarded below two stars.

Ebert and Schneider ultimately settled their differences, and Schneider sent his well wishes to Ebert during his recovery from thyroid cancer. Ebert responded, "Rob Schneider might (in my opinion) have made a bad movie. He is not a bad man." After Ebert's death, in a letter to his widow Chaz, Schneider admitted that the situation caused him to "reassess what pictures I really wanted to make."

Schneider, years later, would admit in retrospect he was disappointed with the film, feeling it lacked the "heart" of the first installment.

=== Accolades ===
The film was nominated for five Golden Raspberry Awards, including Worst Picture, Worst Screenplay, Worst Remake or Sequel and Worst Screen Couple (Rob Schneider and his diapers) with Schneider winning Worst Actor.
