= Michael Manasseri =

American actor and film director (born 1974)

- Born: February 28, 1974 (age 52); Poughkeepsie, New York
- Occupations: Actor, writer, producer, director
- Years active: 1987–present

Michael Manasseri (born February 28, 1974) is an American actor and film director.

== Biography ==
Manasseri is known for his portrayal of Wyatt Donnelly in the TV series Weird Science (1994), Charles in License to Drive and his voice work on Santo Bugito. Manasseri also had a recurring role in the second season of the NBC sitcom Wings as young pilot Kenny McElvey. He guest starred on several TV shows, such as Buffy the Vampire Slayer, The Wonder Years, Boston Public, and ER, and was a regular cast member on Raising Miranda.

He directed his first film, Babysitter Wanted, in 2007, which premiered at the Sitges Film Festival in Spain. His second directed film is the 2012 release, the sci-fi/comic book horror film Sucker. He also was a producer on the 2011 Michigan-made film Detention of the Dead directed by Alex Craig Mann.

He also directed the comedy film The Pickle Recipe, which features David Paymer.

In 2020, Manasseri won an Independent Spirit Award (John Cassavetes Award) for his work as a producer on the 2019 comedy, Give Me Liberty.
