= List of defunct airlines of Nepal =

This is a list of defunct airlines of Nepal.

Airline	Image	IATA	ICAO	Callsign	Commenced operations	Ceased operations	Notes
Aeron Air					1999	?	
Agni Air		AG (Note: Agni Air had no registered IATA code allocated, but used 'AG' on scheduling, ticketing and baggage (as an official IATA code would be used). However, officially, the IATA Code 'AG' is allocated to Aruba Airlines.)			2005	2012	
Air Ananya					1999	?	Rebranded as Shree Airlines
Air Kasthamandap					2009	2017	
Air Nepal International		SZ	NPL	AIR NEPAL	2005	2006	
Alpine Air		N6	AYL		1998	2013	Failed project
Asian Airlines					2002	2006	
Base Air					2004	2007	
BB Airways		BO	BBW	BEE BEE AIRWAYS	2012	2013	Planning to restart operations
Bishwo Airways					2014	?	Failed Project
Blue Airways					2012		never commenced operations
Cosmic Air		F5	COZ	COSMIC AIR	1997	2008	
Everest Air		E2			1992	1998	
Fly Yeti		0Y			2008	2008	
Flying Dragon Airlines					2005	2006	
Garud Air					1998	?	
Gorkha Airlines		G1	IKA	GORKHA AIRLINES	1996	2014	Planning to restart operations
Impro Airways					2006	2010	
Karnali Air					1998	2001	Merged with Necon Air
Lumbini Airways					1997	2001	
Manakamana Airways					1996	?	
Mero Air					2005	2007	
Mountain Air					2000	2002	
Muktinath Airlines					2012	2015	Acquired by Prabhu Helicopter
Namaste Nepalese Air					2012		never commenced operations
Necon Air		3Z	NEC	NECON AIR	1992	2003	
Nepal Airways		7E			1992	1998	
Royal Nepal Airlines		RA	RNA	ROYAL NEPAL	1958	2006	Rebranded as Nepal Airlines
Nepal Transcontinental Airlines					1998	?	Cargo Airline
Simrik Airlines			RMK		2009	2021	Rebranded as Guna Airlines
Shangri-La Air					1999	2001	Merged with Necon Air
Shivani Air					2007	?	
Skyline Airways					1998	2003	
Sky Tech Heli Safari					2010	?	
Swift Air					2011	?	

== See also ==
- List of airlines of Nepal
- List of airports in Nepal
