= Mountain Air =

Mountain Air may refer to:

- Mountain Air (New Zealand), an airline based in New Zealand
- Mountain Air (Nepal), a defunct airline from Nepal
- Mountain Air Cargo, a North Carolina–based cargo airline
- Mountain Air Express, a United States commuter airline founded in 1996
- Mountain Air (film), a 1917 German film

== See also ==
- Mountainair, New Mexico
- Mountainaire, Arizona
