= Bhadrapur Airport =

Airport in Province No. 1 of Nepal

Bhadrapur Airport भद्रपुर विमानस्थल
- IATA: BDP; ICAO: VNCG

Summary
- Airport type: Public
- Owner: Government of Nepal
- Operator: Civil Aviation Authority of Nepal
- Serves: Bhadrapur, Nepal
- Elevation AMSL: 308 ft (94 m)
- Coordinates: 26°34′14″N 88°04′46″E
- Website: chandragadi.caanepal.gov.np

Map
- Location of airport in Nepal

Runways
Direction	Length		Surface
Direction	m	ft	Surface
10/28	1,500	4,921	Asphalt
- Source: DAFIF

Bhadrapur Airport (IATA: BDP, ICAO: VNCG), also known as Chandragadhi Airport, is a domestic airport located in Bhadrapur, primarily serving Jhapa and Ilam districts in Koshi Province, Nepal. The Civil Aviation Authority of Nepal considers it an important hub for passengers entering Nepal from the north eastern states of India, and the passengers from Bhutan and Bangladesh.

== History ==
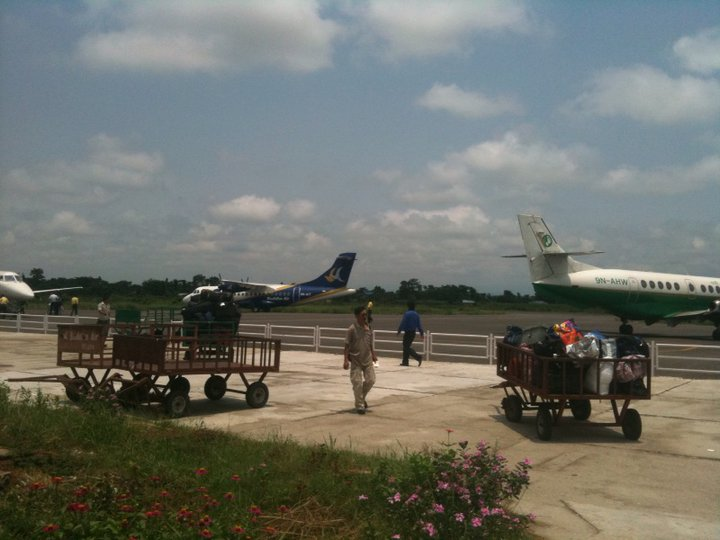
Tarmac at Bhadrapur Airport

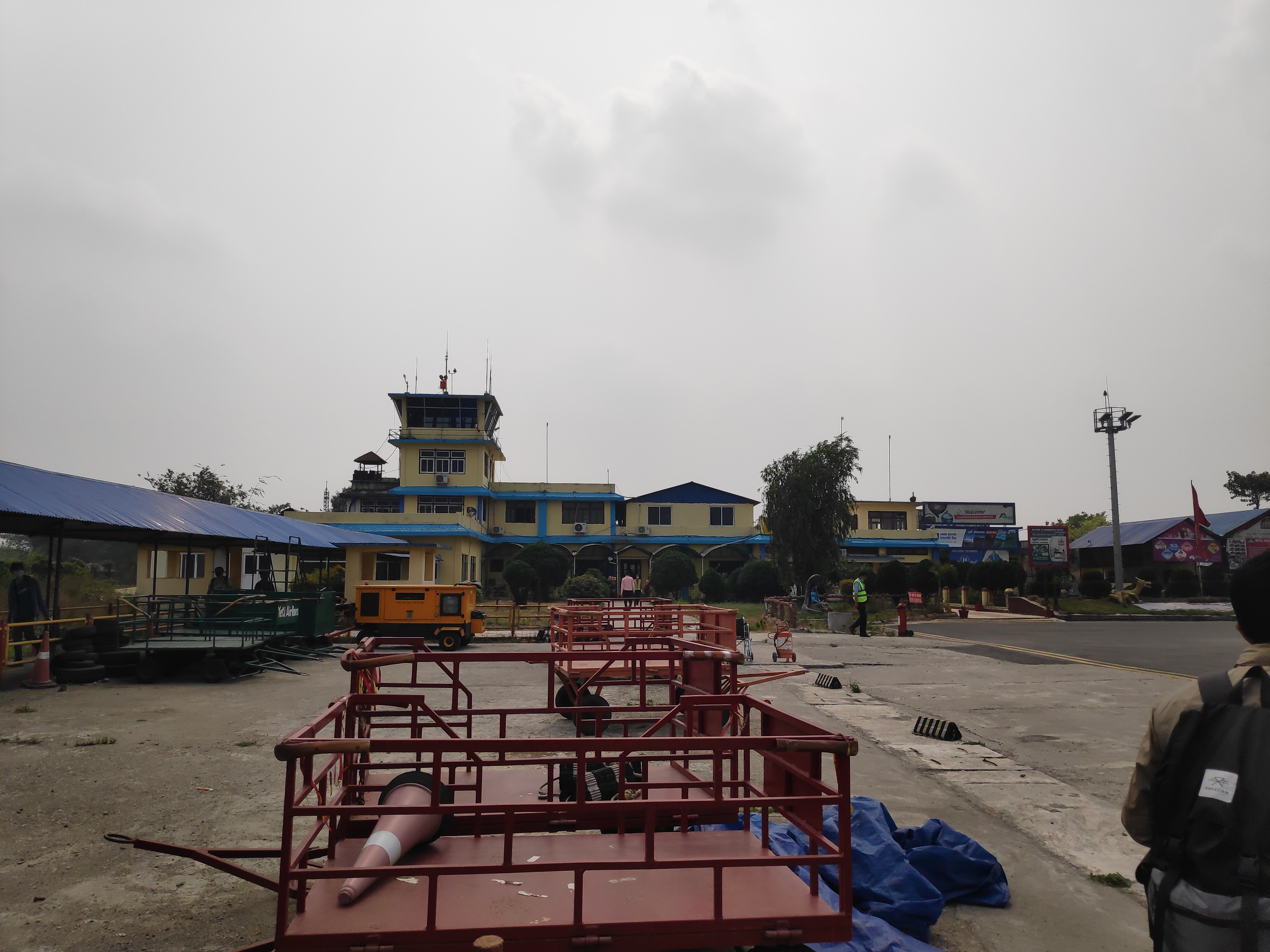
Chandragadi Airport

In the October of 1963, it was reported that the Government of Nepal was constructing an aerodrome in Bhadrapur, Jhapa with Chinese help. The initial project was for military purpose. And that Pakistan had expressed its desire to link it with an air service from Dhaka, Bhadrapur, Kathmandu, Karachi. Photovoltaic cells were used for the first time in Nepal at this airport for running navigation equipment.

The airport has served as an airfield since November 1963. Originally a grass runway, it was re-laid in concrete and has been extended several times. The airport was named "Airport of the Year 2013" by the Civil Aviation Authority of Nepal. On 31 January 2018, Prime Minister K.P. Oli inaugurated a newly built RNAV system at the airport, making it capable of handling night flights.

== Facilities ==
The airport is located at 300 feet (91 m) elevation. It has one runway designated 10/28 with an asphalt surface measuring 1,500 by 30 metres (4,921 ft × 98 ft). All commercial airlines operate through one small terminal of Bhadrapur Airport.

== Airlines and destinations ==
Airlines	Destinations
Buddha Air	Kathmandu, Pokhara–International
Guna Airlines	Kathmandu
Saurya Airlines	Kathmandu
Shree Airlines	Kathmandu
Sita Air	Taplejung, Charter: Kathmandu
Yeti Airlines	Kathmandu

== Accidents and incidents ==
On 2 January 2026, an ATR 72 operated by Buddha Air as Flight 901 suffered a runway excursion while landing at the airport from Kathmandu, injuring seven people.
