= 2024 Saurya Airlines Bombardier CRJ200 crash =

2024 aviation accident in Nepal

Saurya Airlines Flight FER
- 9N-AME, the aircraft involved in the accident, seen in 2019 in a previous livery

Accident
- Date: 24 July 2024
- Summary: Deep stall during takeoff, improper rotation
- Site: Tribhuvan International Airport, Kathmandu, Nepal; 27°42′3″N 85°21′42″E

Aircraft
- Aircraft type: Bombardier CRJ200LR
- Operator: Saurya Airlines
- ICAO flight No.: SAU-FER
- Registration: 9N-AME
- Flight origin: Tribhuvan International Airport, Kathmandu, Nepal
- Destination: Pokhara International Airport, Pokhara, Nepal
- Occupants: 19
- Passengers: 16
- Crew: 3
- Fatalities: 18
- Injuries: 1
- Survivors: 1

On 24 July 2024, a Bombardier CRJ200 operated by Saurya Airlines crashed shortly after takeoff from Tribhuvan International Airport in Kathmandu, Nepal, killing 18 out of the 19 people on board. The aircraft was operating a ferry flight to Pokhara to conduct a maintenance check and was carrying three crew members and sixteen passengers, mostly consisting of Saurya employees. During takeoff, the aircraft rapidly rolled both left and right before losing altitude. The right wing collided with the ground to the side of the runway and the aircraft was destroyed by the impact and post-crash fire. The captain was the sole survivor of the crash.

The investigation, conducted by the Aircraft Accident Investigation Commission, determined that the aircraft rotated at an airspeed lower than optimal and the captain commanded an abnormally high pitch rate. The result was a deep stall during takeoff that was unrecoverable due to the aircraft's low altitude. Several other contributing factors were also noted by investigators. The V-speeds the crew used were based on an erroneous speedcard that displayed incorrect values. Multiple events at Saurya Airlines involving high pitch rates during takeoff were left unidentified and unaddressed. The loading process of the cargo was negligent; operational and ground handling manuals were violated and the load was not secured. Saurya Airlines suspended all flights following the crash.

== Background ==
=== Aircraft ===
The aircraft involved in the accident was a Bombardier CRJ200LR, registered as 9N-AME with manufacturer serial number 7772. It was manufactured in March 2003 and powered by two General Electric CF34-3B1 engines. The aircraft was first delivered to Atlantic Coast Airlines in May 2003 and then entered into service with Saurya Airlines, known then as Kuber Airlines, in March 2017.

In the months leading up to the accident, the aircraft underwent several maintenance events. On 13 March, a survey inspection for the renewal of the aircraft's certificate of airworthiness was carried out. On 26 April, the Civil Aviation Authority of Nepal (CAAN) issued a flight release certificate, and a test flight was conducted the same day to renew the expired airworthiness certificate. The aircraft was subsequently grounded at Kathmandu and sent to short-term storage. A return to service check was carried out on 24 July in preparation for the flight to Pokhara. The CAAN approved the ferry flight on 23 July. The aircraft was being flown to Pokhara for a C check, an extensive maintenance procedure, and had been grounded for 34 days prior to the flight.

=== Passengers and crew ===
The aircraft was carrying 16 passengers, mostly consisting of Saurya Airlines personnel. Most on board were technicians employed to conduct routine maintenance on the aircraft. Among the passengers included Saurya Airlines' continuing airworthiness management organization manager, maintenance manager, safety manager, quality assurance manager. One of the passengers on the flight was a child, while another was the wife of an airline staff member, who was also on board. There were initially identified as Saurya Airlines employees by the company.

There were three crew members on the flight. The captain and pilot-in-command (PIC) of the flight was 35-year-old Manish Shakya. He had a total of 6,185 flight hours, 4,922 of which on the CRJ-200. He obtained his commercial pilot licence (CPL) from a flying school in the Philippines in 2009 and passed a CPL examination in Nepal later that year. He started flying Beechcraft 1900 aircraft for Guna Airlines in 2012. Shakya joined Saurya Airlines in 2015 and was selected by the airline to begin training on the Bombardier CRJ200. He obtained a CPL in 2015 and an airline transport pilot license (ATPL) on the aircraft in 2016. Saurya Airlines then upgraded him to a PIC and was issued an ATPL for a PIC position in 2017. He was the airline's chief of operations. The first officer was 26-year-old Sushant Katuwal. He had a total of 1,824 flight hours, 1,602 of which on the CRJ-200. He obtained a CPL in South Africa in 2019 and passed a CPL examination in Nepal later that year. He conducted ground training in Lithuania and simulator training in Lufthansa Aviation Training GmbH in Germany but failed the simulator test on his first attempt. A third person, Yemeni engineer Aref Reda, was serving as a supernumerary crew member.

== Accident ==
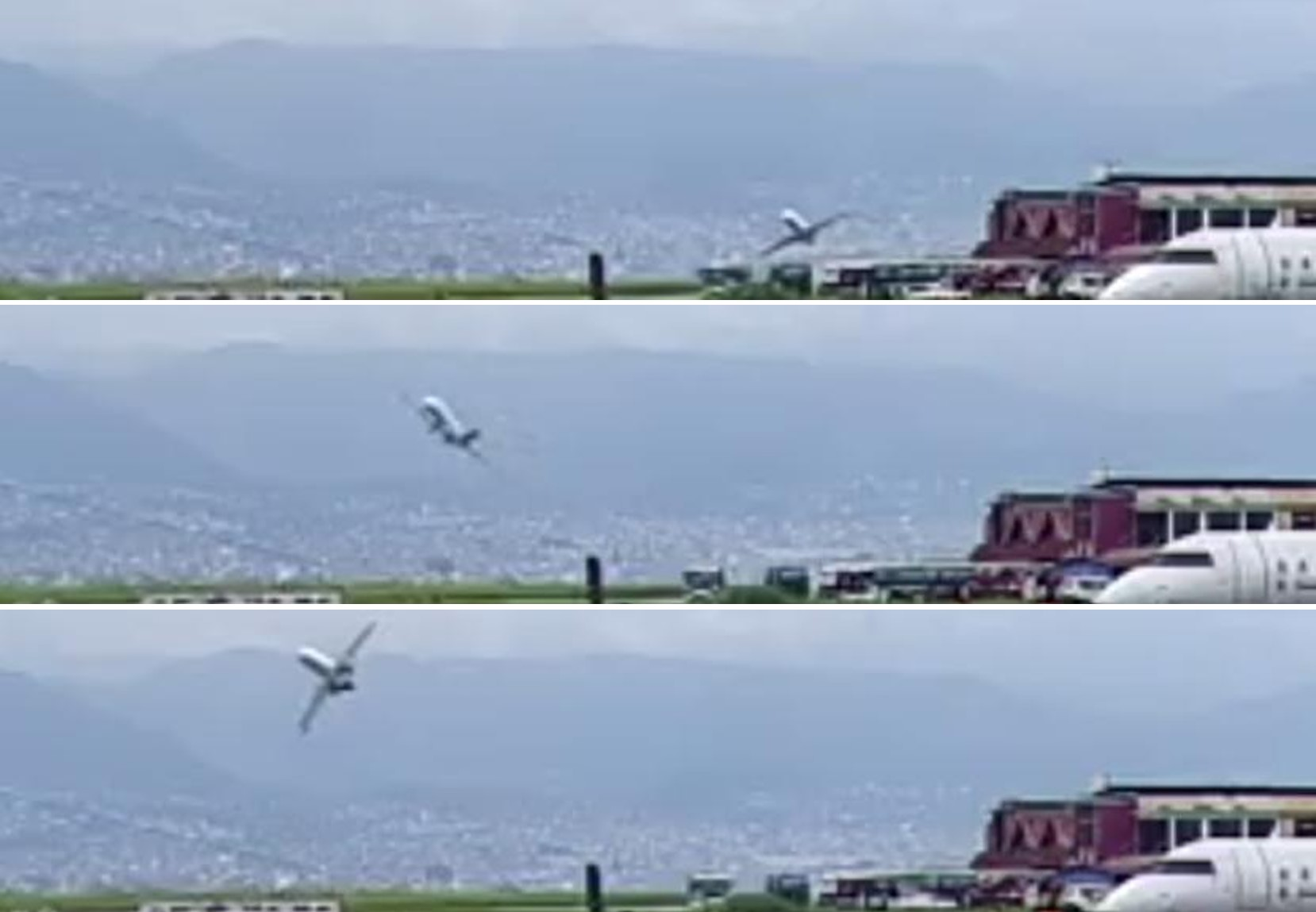
CCTV images of the aircraft banking sharply before the crash

On 24 July 2024, Saurya Airlines planned to fly the aircraft from Tribhuvan International Airport to Pokhara International Airport with flight number SAU-FER. First Officer Katuwal was the first crew member to enter the aircraft and he started preparing the aircraft for the flight. Saurya Airlines personnel and ground staff loaded the cargo bay completely full. They also loaded the cabin with passenger baggage and other equipment. At 10:08 Nepal Standard Time (NPT, UTC+05:45), the first officer began performing pre-flight checks. Thirty minutes later, the flight dispatcher gave details on the weight and balance of the aircraft, which Katuwal used to calculate the V-speeds. Captain Shakya arrived in the cockpit at 10:40. For the next 20 minutes, the crew and other people on board had discussions relating to the planned maintenance check, the destination airport, and other topics not related to the safety of the flight. The engine start-up procedure began at 11:02.

The pilots began taxiing the aircraft to the threshold of Runway 02. The aircraft entered runway 02, backtracked and began the take-off roll at 11:10:35. Twenty seconds later, Shakya began rotating at an airspeed of 120 kn (220 km/h) and the pitch rapidly increased to 13° and the roll subsequently increased to 26° right. The aircraft reached an airspeed of 131 kn (243 km/h) and 11 ft (3.4 m) before the stick shaker activated at the same time as the ground proximity warning system. It subsequently rolled left to 55° while maintaining a pitch of 15°. The stick pusher pushed on both control columns and the aircraft pitched down. The roll then reversed and increased to 94.6° right. The right wing first collided with the ground next to the runway and disintegrated on impact. The fuselage of the aircraft slid 1,000 ft (300 m) further into a gorge located east of the runway, between an aircraft hangar and a radar station.

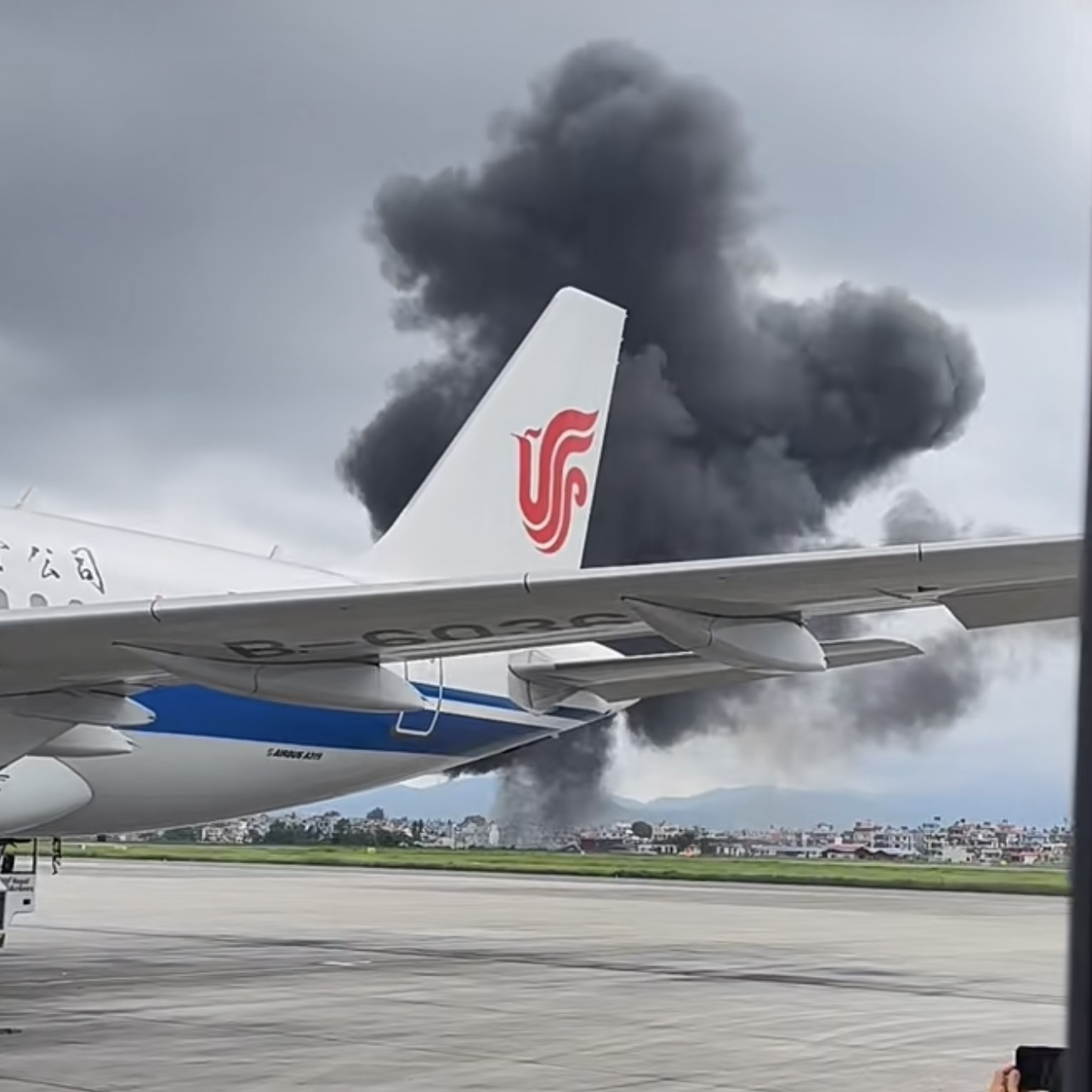
Smoke rising from the crash site after impact

Firefighting vehicles first arrived at the crash site one minute and forty seconds after the accident and started spraying water on the wreckage. The cockpit was separated from the main fuselage by an Air Dynasty container just before the main body struck the ground. The cockpit became lodged in the container, while the rest of the aircraft continued to slide further down the gorge. Rescue crews were able to extract Captain Shakya from the cockpit. He suffered serious although non-life threatening injuries and was taken to Kathmandu Medical College. He was the sole survivor of the crash; the 18 other people on board died of blunt force trauma and burn injuries.

== Investigation ==
The Government of Nepal created the Aircraft Accident Investigation Commission (AAIC) the day of the accident to determine the cause of the crash. Both flight recorders of the aircraft were recovered from the crash site and were sent to the Transport Safety Investigation Bureau of Singapore for analysis, under supervision from the AAIC and with representatives from Transportation Safety Board of Canada and the National Transportation Safety Board of the United States.

=== Accident flight ===
The AAIC discovered multiple factors related to the accident and its severity. As the passengers did not follow normal check-in procedures, the true weight of the cargo was unknown. The cockpit voice recorder (CVR) captured a discussion on the weight of the aircraft among the flight crew, maintenance personnel, and ground personnel. Saurya Airlines ground personnel estimated of the weight of the baggage was 600 kg (1,300 lb), and the estimated weight of the entire aircraft was 18,137 kg (39,985 lb). Investigators later determined the true weight of the aircraft using data from the flight data recorder (FDR) and came to a correct weight of 18,300 kg (40,300 lb)±200 kg (440 lb). Both the estimated and actual weight rounded up to 18,500 kg (40,800 lb), so First Officer Katawal calculated the V-speeds using the card corresponding to an aircraft weight of 18,500 kg (40,800 lb). The V-speeds cards at Saurya Airlines were created by the airline using data from the aircraft manufacturer, Bombardier. Using the card, he determined a V_{1} speed of 114 kn (211 km/h), a V_{R} speed of 118 kn (219 km/h), and a V_{2} speed of 126 kn (233 km/h). However, the V-speed card for a takeoff weight of 18,500 kg (40,800 lb) was identical to the card for a 17,500 kg (38,600 lb) takeoff weight. The actual V_{1}, V_{R}, and V_{2} speeds were 117 kn (217 km/h), 122 kn (226 km/h), and 127 kn (235 km/h). This error was not noticed by anyone at the airline since at least 2017.

=== Saurya Airlines operation and oversight ===
The investigation examined operations at Saurya Airlines and the oversight conducted by the CAAN. FDR data from 9N-AME and 9N-ANM, another CRJ-200 of Saurya Airlines, were analyzed by the AAIC to determine the performance of flight crew. Rotation rates of above 3° per second were common, with 18 recorded instances of excessive pitch rates of above 4° per second on 9N-AME recorded. In March 2024, 9N-AME experienced a 5.5° per second pitch rate with the same pilot-in-command of the accident flight. The most significant instance recorded was in January 2024 with a pitch rate of 5.8° per second.

=== Final report ===
On 14 July 2025, the AAIC submitted their final report to the Ministry of Culture, Tourism and Civil Aviation. The report was released publicly four days later on 18 July. They determined:

The most probable cause of the accident was a deep stall during take-off because of an abnormally rapid pitch rate commanded at a lower than optimal rotation speed.

The contributory factors to the accident are:

1. Incorrect speeds calculated based on erroneous speedcard. The interpolated speedcard of the operator for 18,500 kg TOW mentions incorrect V-speeds for take-off. This error in the speedcard went unnoticed since its development. There was no acceptance/approval of the speedcard booklet.

2. Failure to identify and address multiple previous events of high pitch rate during take-off by the operator.

3. The operator showed gross negligence in complying with the prevailing practices of ferry flight planning, preparation and execution. There is a lack of consistent definition of ferry flights.

4. Gross negligence and non-compliances by the operator during the entire process of cargo and baggage handling (weighing, loading, distribution and latching), while violating the provisions of the operational manual and ground handling manual. The load was not adequately secured with straps, tie-downs, or nets, while the flight preparation was rushed.

== Aftermath ==
Tribhuvan International Airport was temporarily shut down following the accident, and domestic flights at various airports were halted. Saurya Airlines suspended all flights following the accident.

Several political figures, including Prime Minister K. P. Sharma Oli, Home Minister Ramesh Lekhak, Civil Aviation Minister Badri Pandey and Chairman of the State Affairs Committee Ram Hari Khatiwada, visited the crash site while rescue operations were still ongoing, and offered their condolences. Later that same day, Prime Minister Oli called for an emergency cabinet meeting. The government declared that the national flag would be flown at half-mast the following day in honor of the crash victims.

The bodies of the victims were taken to the Tribhuvan University Teaching Hospital in Kathmandu for autopsies.

== See also ==
- List of accidents and incidents involving commercial aircraft
- List of airplane accidents in Nepal
- Arrow Air Flight 1285R – Accident involving inappropriate takeoff reference speeds
- Turkish Airlines Flight 301, Continental Airlines Flight 1713, Régional Flight 7775 – Accidents involving over-rotation on takeoff
- Yeti Airlines Flight 101 – Another accident in Nepal with 18 fatalities and the captain being the sole survivor.
