= List of airlines of Nepal =

This is a list of airlines which have a current air operator's certificate issued by the Civil Aviation Authority of Nepal. All airlines are on the List of airlines banned in the European Union.

This is a list of airlines currently operating in Civil Aviation Authority of Nepal.

== Mainline/International ==
| Airline | Sector | Image | IATA | ICAO | Callsign | AOC issued | Aircraft |
|---|---|---|---|---|---|---|---|
| Himalaya Airlines | International | | H9 | HIM | HIMALAYA | 2014 | 4 |
| Nepal Airlines | Domestic/International | | RA | RNA | ROYAL NEPAL | 1958 | 6 |
| Buddha Air | Domestic/International | | U4 | BHA | BUDDHA AIR | 1997 | 18 |

== Regional/Domestic ==
| Airline | Sector | Image | IATA | ICAO | Callsign | AOC issued | Aircraft |
|---|---|---|---|---|---|---|---|
| Shree Airlines | Domestic | | N9 | SHA | SHREE AIR | 1999 | 11 |
| Sita Air | Domestic | | ST | STA (Note: Sita Air has no registered ICAO code allocated, but uses 'STA' on scheduling, ticketing and baggage (as an official ICAO code would be used). However, officially, the ICAO Code 'STA' is allocated to Star Aviation UK.) | - | 2003 | 4 |
| Summit Air | Domestic | | - | SMA (Note: Summit Air has no registered ICAO code allocated, but uses "SMA" on scheduling, ticketing and baggage (as an official ICAO code would be used). However, officially, the ICAO Code SMA is allocated to SMA Airlines.) | - | 2011 | 4 |
| Tara Air | Domestic | | TB | TRA (Note: Tara Air has no registered ICAO code allocated, but uses 'TRA' on scheduling, ticketing and baggage (as an official ICAO code would be used). However, officially, the ICAO Code 'TRA' is allocated to Transavia.) | TARA AIR | 2009 | 3 |
| Yeti Airlines | Domestic | | YT | NYT | YETI AIRLINES | 1998 | 7 |

== Charter airlines ==
| Airline | Sector | Image | IATA | ICAO | AOC Issued | Type | Aircraft |
|---|---|---|---|---|---|---|---|
| Air Dynasty | Domestic | | | | 1993 | Helicopter | 5 |
| Simrik Air | Domestic | | | | 2001 | Helicopter | 4 |
| Heli Everest | Domestic | | | | 2016 | Helicopter | 4 |
| Fishtail Air | Domestic | | | | 1997 | Helicopter | 2 |
| Kailash Helicopter Services | Domestic | | | | 2018 | Helicopter | 3 |
| Altitude Air | Domestic | | | | 2016 | Helicopter | 2 |
| Manang Air | Domestic | | | | 1997 | Helicopter | 2 |
| Annapurna Helicopters | Domestic | | | | 2019 | Helicopter | 2 |
| Mountain Helicopters | Domestic | | | | 2009 | Helicopter | 2 |
| Prabhu Helicopter | Domestic | | | | 2015 | Helicopter | 2 |
| Mustang Helicopters | Domestic | | | | 2021 | Helicopter | 1 |

== AOC Suspended Airlines ==
- Guna Airlines
- Saurya Airlines

== See also ==
- List of defunct airlines of Nepal
- List of defunct airlines of Asia
- List of airports in Nepal
- List of air carriers banned in the European Union
