= US-Bangla Airlines Flight 211 =

2018 aviation accident in Nepal

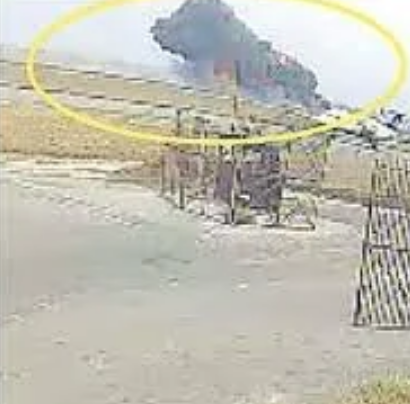
- A CCTV still of the explosion after the crash

Accident
- Date: 12 March 2018
- Summary: Runway excursion on landing due to pilot error and unstable approach
- Site: Tribhuvan International Airport, Kathmandu, Nepal; 27°41′33.29″N 85°21′32.03″E

Aircraft
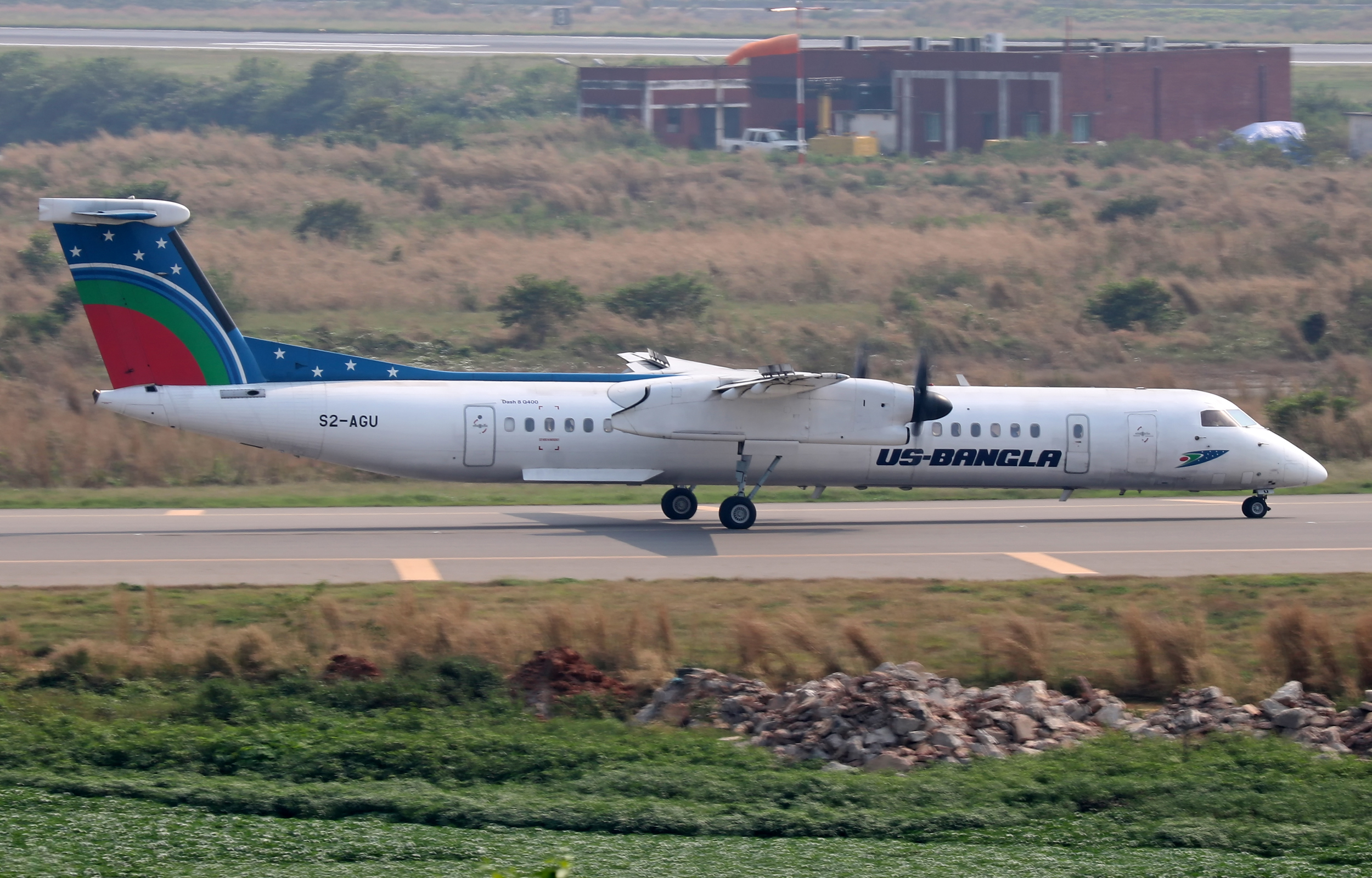
- S2-AGU, the aircraft involved, seen 6 days before the accident
- Aircraft type: Bombardier Q400
- Operator: US-Bangla Airlines
- IATA flight No.: BS211
- ICAO flight No.: UBG211
- Call sign: BANGLA STAR 211
- Registration: S2-AGU
- Flight origin: Hazrat Shahjalal International Airport, Dhaka, Bangladesh
- Destination: Tribhuvan International Airport, Kathmandu, Nepal
- Occupants: 71
- Passengers: 67
- Crew: 4
- Fatalities: 51
- Injuries: 20
- Survivors: 20

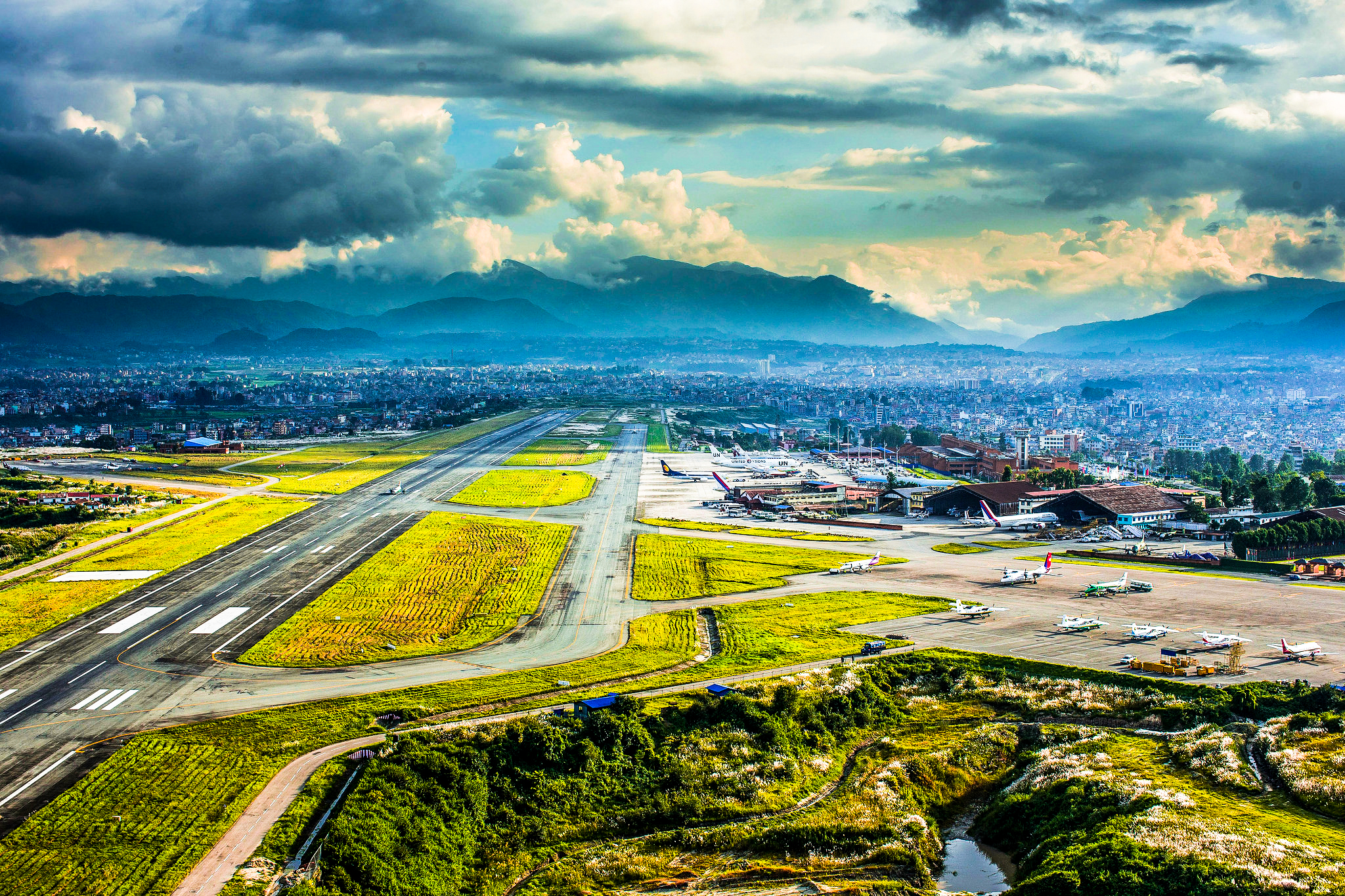
Aerial view of Tribhuvan International Airport (TIA)

US-Bangla Airlines Flight 211 was a scheduled international passenger flight from Hazrat Shahjalal International Airport in Dhaka, Bangladesh, to Tribhuvan International Airport in Kathmandu, Nepal, that crashed on 12 March 2018 while landing, killing 51 of the 71 people aboard. The aircraft, a 76-seat Bombardier Q400 operated by US-Bangla Airlines, burst into flames after the crash. The 20 surviving passengers were badly injured from the impact and the fire. It remains the deadliest aviation disaster involving a Bangladeshi airline, and the deadliest incident involving a Bombardier Dash 8 Q400.

A commission appointed by the government of Nepal investigated the accident and concluded that the probable cause of the crash was pilot disorientation and a loss of situational awareness of the flight crew. The report was criticized by the airline and by the Bangladeshi representative on the commission, who felt that the air traffic controllers at Tribhuvan International Airport did not do their job properly and could have prevented the accident.

== Accident ==
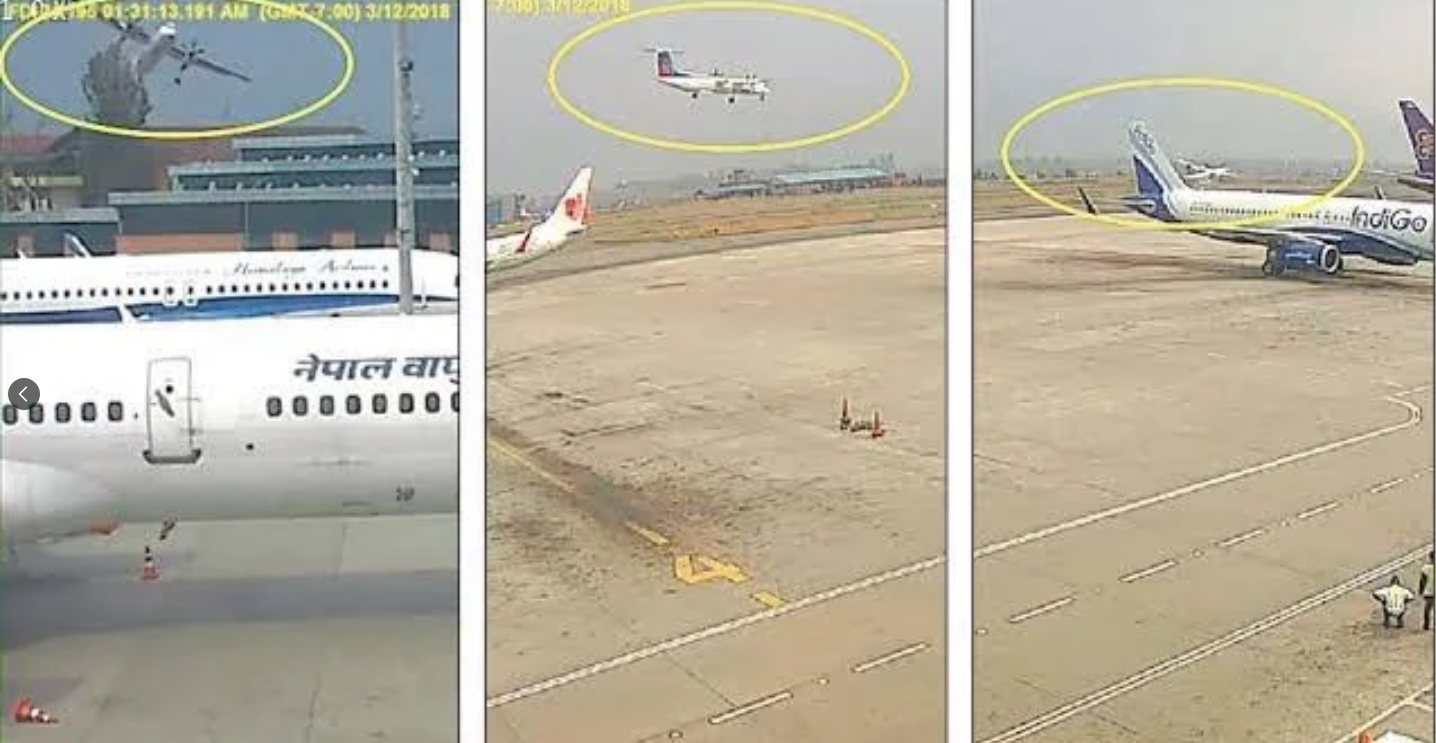
Three CCTV stills of the aircraft shortly before crashing

The Bombardier Q400 turboprop aircraft operating as flight number BS-211, departed Hazrat Shahjalal International Airport in Dhaka, Bangladesh, at 06:51 UTC (12:51 pm Bangladesh Standard Time), bound for Tribhuvan International Airport in Kathmandu, Nepal. BS-211 was a regularly scheduled flight that operated four times a week between the two cities.

At 08:10 UTC, First Officer Prithula Rashid contacted Kathmandu Approach, who told the flight to descend to 13,500 feet (4,100 m) and enter a holding pattern at a specified navigational waypoint. Long approach delays were common at Kathmandu, due to a lack of airport capacity and a high volume of traffic, so the instruction to enter a holding pattern was not unusual. Since they were slightly ahead of schedule, the pilots expected the delay to last several minutes, so they discussed the navigational elements of the holding pattern and configured the flight management system in preparation. However, before the aircraft had arrived at the holding point, the approach controller instead cleared the flight to descend and proceed directly to the approach for runway 02. The pilots had not reconfigured the flight management system for the approach, however, so when the aircraft arrived at the next waypoint, the autopilot began a left-hand turn of the aircraft as it had been configured for the holding pattern. Captain Abid Sultan realized that the plane was turning away from the intended course, and quickly changed the aircraft's autopilot heading selector to a course that would intercept the correct approach and manually adjusted the autopilot's rate of descent. These changes caused the aircraft's autopilot to switch to a mode where the course and rate of descent were controlled by the cockpit selectors instead of the aircraft's flight management system, which was programmed to automatically follow the course and the rate of descent to align with the targeted runway.

The crew performed the landing checklist, but Sultan erroneously stated that the landing gear was down and locked, when in fact, it was not. Because the flight management system was disengaged, the pilots had to manually adjust the aircraft's rate of descent, and failed to select a rate that kept the aircraft at its intended altitude throughout the planned descent. Rashid repeatedly called out that they were 500 to 600 feet (150 to 180 m) too high compared to their desired altitude. Meanwhile, a gear-unsafe alert tone sounded continuously in the cockpit, unacknowledged by the pilots. With their attention focused on trying to adjust to the correct altitude, and distracted by the audible warnings, the crew failed to notice that the plane was still off course, and had by this time flown to the right of the desired approach path, descending at rates as high as 1,700 feet per minute (520 m/min). Audible warnings of "MINIMUM", "SINK RATE", "TERRAIN", and "TOO LOW-GEAR" sounded, adding to the confusion. Rashid noticed that the landing gear was not down and lowered it, but by this time the aircraft had already passed the runway, and neither pilot was aware of it. The tower contacted the flight crew and informed them that they had been cleared to land on runway 02, but they appeared to be heading to runway 20, the opposite end of the single runway, and asked Sultan's intention. Still unaware that they had already passed the runway, he responded that he intended to land on runway 02. Seeing high terrain ahead of them, he performed a sharp right-hand turn, during which the aircraft descended to as low as 175 ft (53 m) above the ground, and reached bank angles of up to 35 to 40°. This triggered additional alerts and alarms of "PULL UP", "TERRAIN", and "BANK ANGLE" in the cockpit. After flying to the west without spotting the runway, Captain Sultan calmly admitted to Rashid that he had made a mistake and had become distracted by talking to her, and performed another steep right turn, with bank angles as high as 45° and descent rates of over 2,000 ft/min (610 m/min).

Eventually, with air traffic controllers on the radio still trying to clarify where the aircraft was going and the plane flying in a southeasterly direction, Rashid spotted runway 20 at the aircraft's 3 o'clock position, about two nautical miles (2.3 mi; 3.7 km) away, and Sultan made a sharp and abrupt right turn back to the west in an attempt to return to the approach end of the runway. The aircraft overflew the end of runway 20 on a heading of 255°, 450 feet (140 m) above the ground, turning left with a forty-degree bank angle. Alarmed by the actions of the aircraft, the air traffic controller hastily cancelled the flight's landing clearance, erroneously calling out "takeoff clearance cancelled". The aircraft flew over the airport's domestic passenger terminal less than 50 feet (15 m) over its roof, and controllers in the tower ducked down out of fear. The aircraft made another sharp turn in an attempt to line up with the runway before touching down at an angle 5,600 feet (1,700 m) along the runway with its right main landing gear. The aircraft was travelling at the cockpit-indicated airspeed of 127 knots (235 km/h; 146 mph) and a heading of 190 degrees when it hit the runway. The aircraft skidded off the runway, crashed through the inner perimeter fence on the edge of the airport, and slid down the slope. The aircraft disintegrated into pieces as it slid down the rough slope before crashing into the football field and bursting into flames. The aircraft came to a stop about 442 metres (1,450 ft; 483 yd) southeast of the runway.

== Aftermath ==
The plane was engulfed in flames within seconds of the initial touchdown, and airport personnel immediately dispatched emergency equipment. Fire trucks arrived within two minutes and firefighters had to put out a grass fire in their path before they could reach the aircraft. The fire at the crashed aircraft took fifteen minutes to extinguish. The airport was closed for three hours after the crash, and incoming flights were diverted to other airports. As of March 2019, one year after the crash, the wreckage of the aircraft was still beside the runway at the airport.

The 22 passengers who survived the impact and subsequent fire were sent to local hospitals. Two of those survivors later died of their injuries. Survivability was the highest on the right side or near the front of the aircraft, as passengers on the left side were most likely directly killed by impact forces, but the rapidly spreading fire after the crash limited options for escape for the passengers who survived the initial impact. Many of the crash victims were burned beyond recognition, and DNA tests were required to identify their remains. At the time of the accident, it was the deadliest aviation disaster involving a Bangladeshi airline, and the deadliest accident involving the Bombardier Dash 8 Q400.

In the following days, Nepali Prime Minister Khadga Prasad Oli visited the crash site and announced that an investigation into the cause of the crash was underway. Imran Asif, chief executive officer of US-Bangla Airlines, told reporters that the company's early opinion was that the crash was caused by air traffic controllers at the airport misleading the pilots, causing them to attempt to land on the wrong runway. He said that he doubted that any negligence existed on the part of the pilots. Nepal Army Lt.Col. Puran Ghale, who was among the first rescuers to arrive at the aircraft after the crash, complained that aircraft engineers were slow to arrive at the crash site, which hindered the rescue efforts. A spokesman for the airline insisted that the governments of both Bangladesh and Nepal cooperate in the investigation to "launch a fair investigation and find the reason behind the accident." Responding to early reports, the airline denied that the doomed flight was the first officer's maiden flight into Kathmandu. In later statements, the airline said that it would cover the hospital expenses of injured survivors and pay US$25,000 to the relatives of each of the passengers who died.

Two days after the accident, US-Bangla Airlines suspended all service to Kathmandu for an indefinite period. The airline applied for resumption of its Kathmandu operation, in September 2018, intending to resume flights on 28 October, but a source inside the Civil Aviation Authority of Nepal said that approval was "highly unlikely" to be granted due to the many critical statements about the operation of the airport that executives from the airline had made after the accident.

Shortly after the accident, a local news agency published a video taken by Kathmandu residents showing the plane flying very low in the vicinity of the airport. In early 2019, a second video surfaced on social media sites that showed CCTV footage from the airport. The second video showed the aircraft narrowly missing buildings and parked airplanes at the airport, and the last moments of the flight.

In 2025, the Kathmandu District Court, ordered US-Bangla Airlines to pay $2.74 million each to families of 17 crash victims, in what was described as the first ruling of its kind in Nepali aviation.

== Aircraft ==
The aircraft was a Bombardier Q400, configured with a seating capacity of 76 passengers, and registered as aircraft S2-AGU. It was first delivered to Scandinavian Airlines in 2001, and flown by three airlines before being purchased by US-Bangla Airlines in 2014. It had already been involved in a minor incident in 2015, when it skidded off the runway in Saidpur, resulting in minor damage to its right main wheels. At the time of the crash, the aircraft had flown a total of 28,649 takeoff cycles, for a total of 21,419 hours, and was current on its maintenance. The impact forces of the crash and the post-crash fire destroyed the aircraft.

== Passengers and crew ==
The aircraft was carrying 65 adult passengers, two children, and four crew members, for a total of 71 on board. Of the passengers, 33 were from Nepal, 32 from Bangladesh, one from China, and one from the Maldives. All of the crew were from Bangladesh. Fifty-one passengers and crew members were killed in the accident: 22 from Nepal, 28 from Bangladesh, and one from China. Most of the Nepalis killed in the crash were medical students from Jalalabad Ragib Rabeya Medical College of Sylhet, who were returning home after finishing their final professional exam. Twenty passengers survived with serious injuries.

The captain of the flight was 52-year-old Abid Sultan, a former Bangladesh Air Force pilot. Sultan had 22 years of flying experience, with more than 5,500 hours of flight time, and more than 1,700 hours of experience flying the Q400. He had worked for US-Bangla since 2015 and was also an instructor and Q400 check pilot for the airline. He was experienced with the flight to Kathmandu, having flown it more than 100 times. He had resigned from the airline before the flight, but as part of the airline's code of conduct, he was required to continue working until he had been discharged. He suffered multiple blunt-force trauma to his head and chest, initially surviving the crash, but he died of his injuries the next day.

The first officer was 25-year-old Prithula Rashid, the first female pilot of the airline. She joined the airline in July 2016, and had a total of 390 hours of flight experience, 240 hours in the aircraft type. This was her first time flying into Kathmandu. She died of her injuries, described as blunt-force trauma injury to her head.

The two cabin crew members, Khwaza Hossain Mohammad Shafi and Shamim Akter, also died after the crash.

== Investigation ==
After the crash, the government of Nepal formed an Aircraft Accident Investigation Commission to determine the cause and the circumstances of the accident. The six-member commission was also assisted by Captain Salahuddin Rahmatullah, the head of the Aircraft Accident Investigation Group of the Civil Aviation Authority of Bangladesh, and Nora Vallée, senior investigator for the Transportation Safety Board of Canada, where the aircraft was manufactured.

The commission released a preliminary report on 9 April 2018. The report was a brief synopsis of the accident and stated that the aircraft had touched down 1,700 metres (5,600 ft) down runway 20 heading southwest before going off the runway. It said the cockpit voice and flight data recorders had been recovered and had been sent to the Transportation Safety Board of Canada for analysis along with other aircraft components.

On 27 August 2018, Nepal's Kathmandu Post newspaper reported that a source had leaked details from the still-ongoing official investigation. The source said that the commission was planning to assign blame for the crash on Captain Abid Sultan, and said that he was smoking continuously in the cockpit, lied to the control tower during the landing, and engaged in erratic behavior. The airline and the Bangladeshi representative to the commission dismissed the newspaper report as "baseless", stating that the story was filled with false information, designed to make the airline and its employees look bad.

The final investigation report released on 27 January 2019 concluded that pilot disorientation and a lack of situation awareness led to the crash.

When we analyzed the conversation on the cockpit voice recorder, it was clear to us that the captain was harbouring severe mental stress. He also seemed to be fatigued and tired due to lack of sleep – he was crying on several occasions.

— Final accident report by the Civil Aviation Authority of Nepal

The report also shows that Sultan made multiple abusive statements regarding a young female pilot whom he had trained and who had questioned his reputation as an instructor. He also spoke of a rumor that the trainee pilot and he had engaged in an extramarital affair, which had forced him to resign from the company. When telling this, he cried and wondered aloud where he would be able to find another job and stated that he had been so worried that he had not slept the previous night. Records show that Rashid, the co-pilot, who was on her first flight to Kathmandu and showed interest to learn at every stage of the flight, was a passive listener to Sultan's story throughout the flight.

The sole Bangladeshi representative on the investigative panel was publicly critical of the final report, saying that it left out the fact that air traffic controllers at the airport did not execute their duties properly. He said that the controllers could have provided navigational assistance to the pilots once it became apparent that they were disoriented, but they did not. He said that if the controllers had done so, the accident could have been averted.

== In popular culture ==
The crash of Flight 211 was featured on season 21 of the Canadian documentary series Mayday, in the episode titled "Meltdown Over Kathmandu".
