= Bishwo Airways =

Cancelled Nepalese airline

IATA	ICAO	Call sign
—	—	—
- Founded: 2014
- Hubs: Tribhuvan International Airport
- Headquarters: Kathmandu, Nepal

Bishwo Airways was a planned Nepalese airline founded in 2014 which was supposed to be based at Tribhuvan International Airport in Kathmandu, Nepal.

== History ==
Bishwo Airways was founded in Gaushala, Kathmandu in 2014 by Bishwo Holdings from Singapore with the aim of starting operations in 2015. The airline was supposed to fly to Dammam, Kuala Lumpur, Beijing and Tokyo-Narita but also aimed at flying to India and Europe. The airline also planned to conduct cargo operations. Bishwo Airlines made international headlines in 2015 when it announced that it would acquire 5 Sukhoi Superjets 100-95.

However, as of 2022 the airline never commenced operations.

== Fleet ==
Bishwo Airways announced plans to operate the following aircraft, which however never materialized:

Aircraft	In Fleet	Orders	Passengers			Notes
Aircraft	In Fleet	Orders	C	Y	Total	Notes
Airbus A330-200	—	2	TBA	TBA	TBA
Sukhoi Superjet 100-95	—	5	TBA	TBA	93
Total	0	7
