= Prabhu Helicopter =

Nepalese helicopter operator

IATA	ICAO	Call sign
—	—	—
- Founded: 2015; 11 years ago
- AOC #: 081/2013
- Hubs: Pokhara International Airport, Tribhuvan International Airport
- Fleet size: 5
- Headquarters: Kathmandu, Nepal
- Website: www.prabhuhelicopter.com/

Prabhu Helicopter is a helicopter airline based at Pokhara International Airport in Pokhara, Nepal, operating chartered helicopter services. The company was established in 2015 under the Air Operators Certificate issued by the Government of Nepal as a subsidiary of the Prabhu Group. The Company carries domestic chartered helicopter flights throughout Nepal out and Rescue Missions. It is currently banned from flying in the EU.

== History ==
The Airline was founded by the Prabhu Bank, which acquired Muktinath Airlines, a Nepali helicopter airline operating a single Robinson R44 based in Pokhara.

In 2018, the airline was the first airline of Nepal to introduce the Robinson R66 in Nepal. In 2018, the airline opened its second hub at Tribhuvan International Airport in Kathmandu.

== Fleet ==
The Prabhu Helicopter fleet consists of the following aircraft (as of January 2023):

Prabhu Helicopter fleet
Aircraft	In fleet	Orders	Passengers			Notes
Aircraft	In fleet	Orders	C	Y	Total	Notes
Airbus Helicopters H125	1	0	0	5	5	
Robinson R66	4	0	0	4	4	
Total	5	0				

=== Former fleet ===
Prabhu Helicopter historical fleet
Aircraft	Introduced	Retired	Notes
Robinson R44	2015	?	
