= Tribhuvan International Airport =

Airport in Kathmandu, Nepal

Tribhuvan International Airport त्रिभुवन अन्तर्राष्ट्रिय विमानस्थल

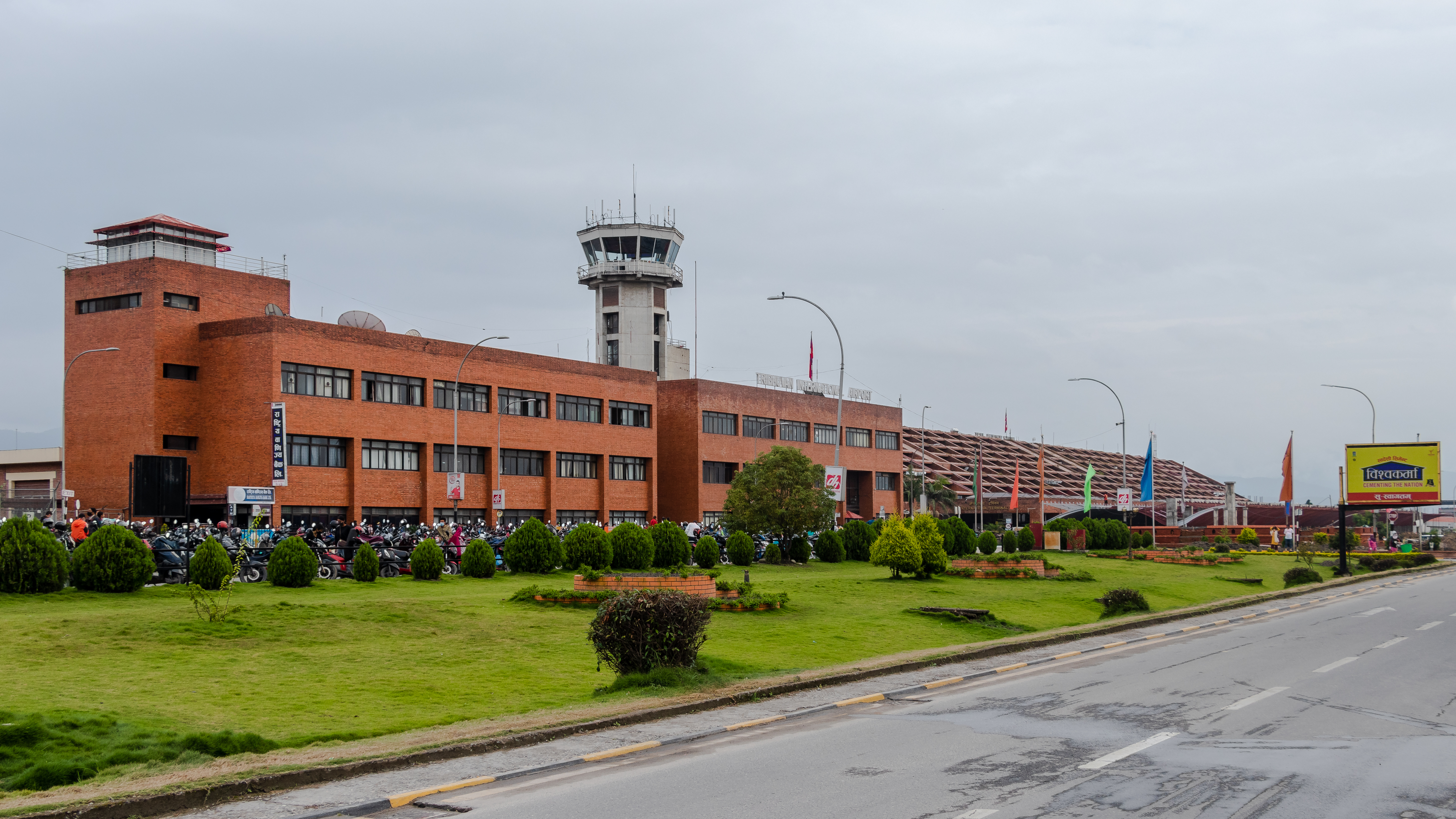
- IATA: KTM; ICAO: VNKT

Summary
- Airport type: Public
- Owner: Government of Nepal
- Operator: Civil Aviation Authority of Nepal (CAAN)
- Serves: Kathmandu, Nepal
- Opened: 1949; 77 years ago
- Hub for: Buddha Air; Guna Airlines; Himalaya Airlines; Nepal Airlines; Saurya Airlines; Shree Airlines; Sita Air; Tara Air; Yeti Airlines
- Elevation AMSL: 4,390 ft (1,340 m)
- Coordinates: 27°41′47″N 085°21′32″E
- Website: www.tiairport.com.np

Map
- Location within Nepal

Runways
Direction	Length		Surface
Direction	m	ft	Surface
02/20	3,350	10,991	Asphalt

Statistics (2023)
- Passengers: 8,991,993
- Passenger change 2018-19: ▲1.867%
- Aircraft movements: 233,187
- Movements change 2018-19: ▼4.06%
- Land area: 356.536 ha
- Sources: CAAN and DAFIF

Tribhuvan International Airport (Nepali: त्रिभुवन अन्तर्राष्ट्रिय विमानस्थल, romanized: Tribhuvan Antarrāṣṭriya Vimānasthal, IATA: KTM, ICAO: VNKT, colloquially referred to as TIA) is an international airport located in Kathmandu, Bagmati, Nepal. It has a tabletop runway, a domestic terminal and an international terminal. As the country's main international airport, it connects Nepal to over 40 destinations in 17 countries.

The airport is a hub for two international airlines—the flag carrier Nepal Airlines and Himalaya Airlines, along with multiple other domestic carriers. The airport is considered as a starting point for Mount Everest international tourists, with several daily flights to Lukla. Several airlines also offer Everest sightseeing flights from Kathmandu.

Due to heavy traffic congestion, winter fog and the airport running at capacity, the Government of Nepal promoted Gautam Buddha International Airport and Pokhara International Airport as alternative airports in case of necessary diversions.

== History ==
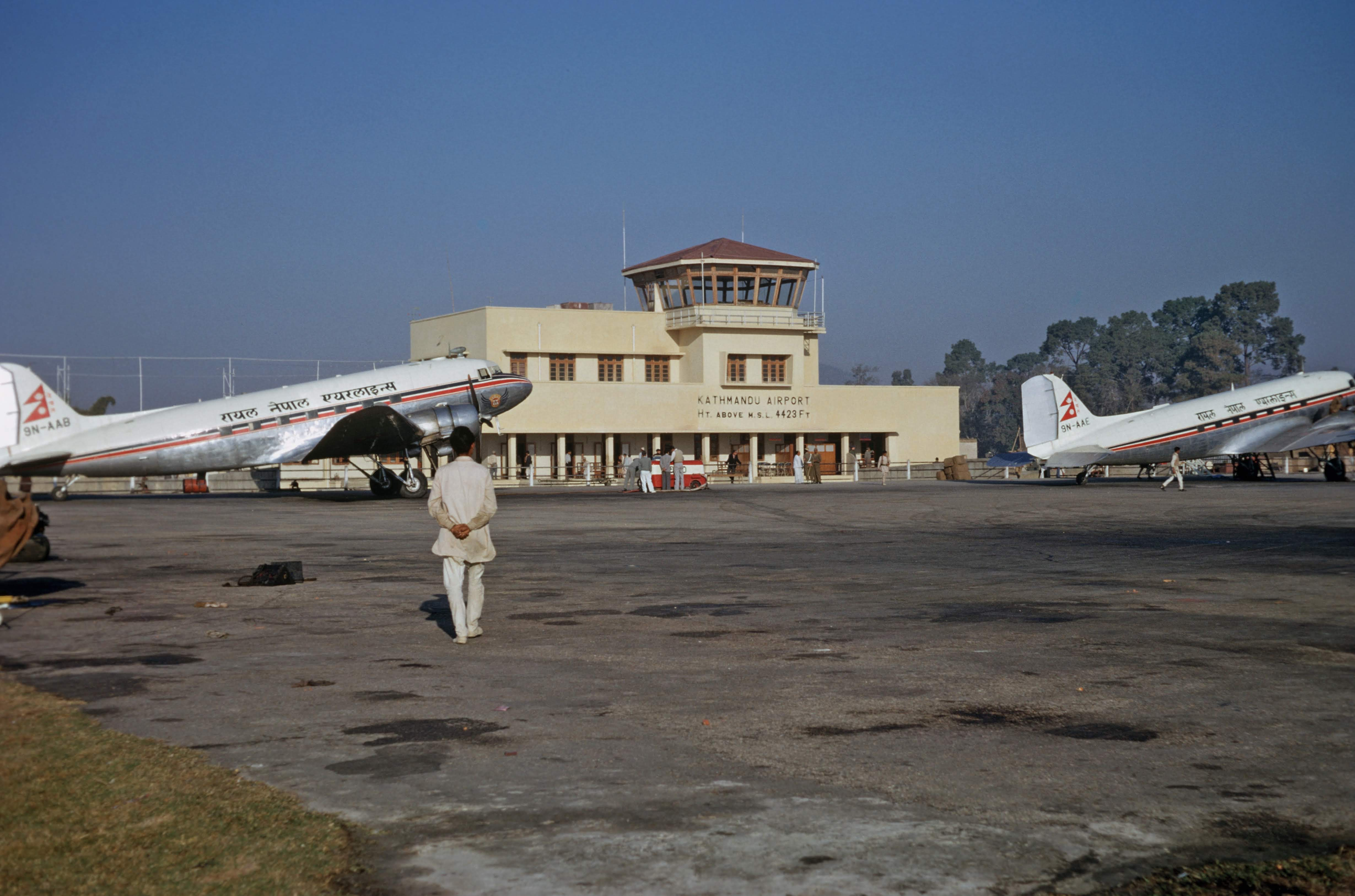
Planes from Royal Nepal Airlines at the airport in 1963

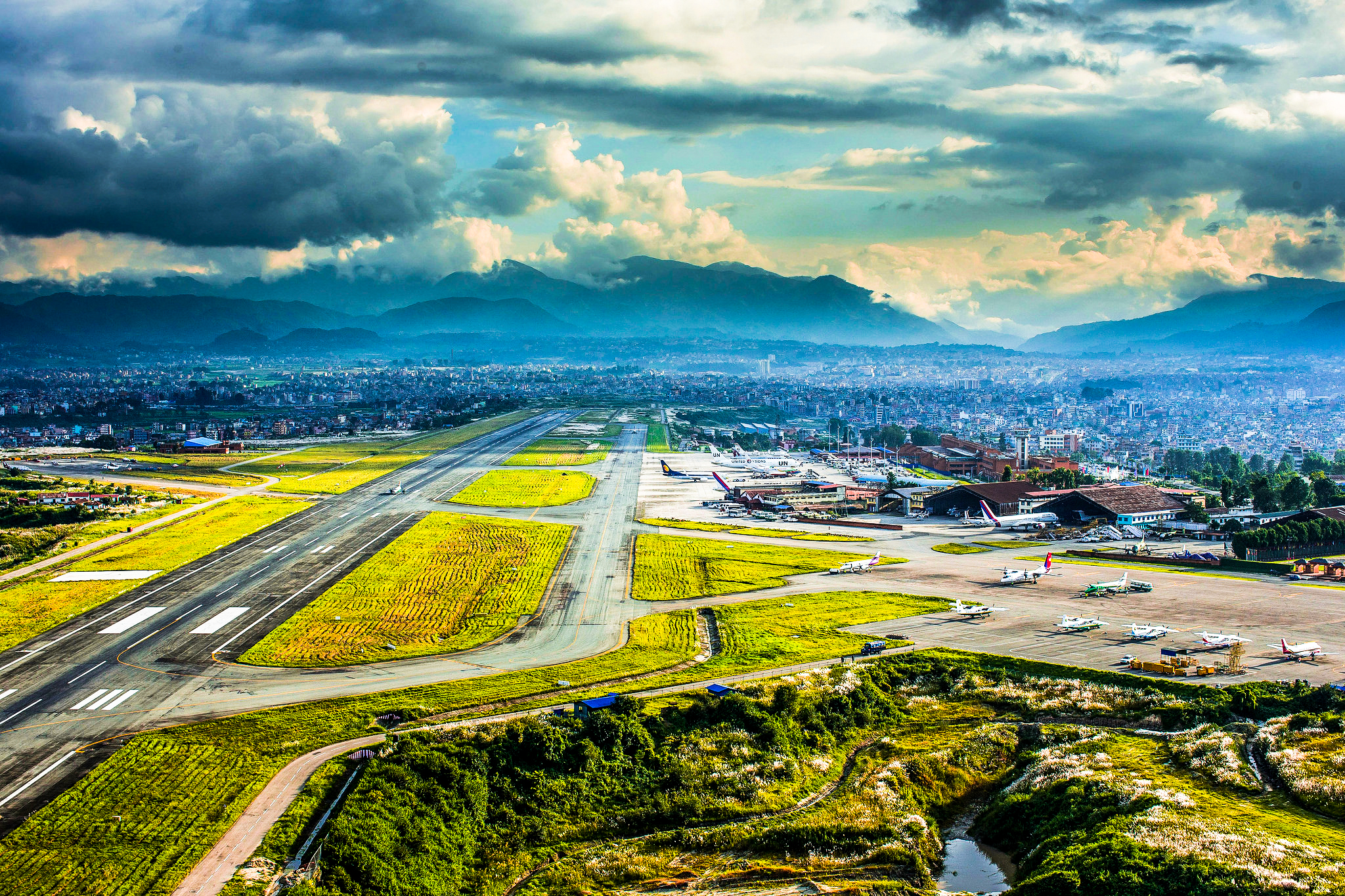
Aerial view of Tribhuvan International Airport

The airport was originally named called Gauchaur Airport, after the area of Kathmandu where it was situated. In Nepali, "Gauchaur" refers to a place where cows graze. The formal beginning of aviation in Nepal is generally placed at Gauchaur in 1949 with the landing of a Beechcraft Bonanza carrying the Indian ambassador, although there are disputed claims that Simara Airport existed in some form as early as 1946.

The first flight into Gauchaur occurred on 23 April 1949.

The first charter flight took place between Gauchaur and Calcutta, in a Himalayan Aviation Dakota on 20 February 1950.

On 20 February 1950, an Indian registered Dakota DC-3 commenced the first ever scheduled service, linking Kathmandu to Patna, Kolkata and Delhi.

In 1950, King Tribhuvan took refuge at the Indian embassy in an attempt to overthrow the Rana dynasty. Gyanendra Bir Bikram Shah, the four-year-old grandson of Tribhuvan was crowned the new king. On 10 November 1950, two Indian planes landed at Gauchaur Airport and carried the young king along with his grandfather to Delhi. After the Delhi Accord, the Rana regime ended and King Tribhuvan landed at Gauchaur Airport as the monarch on 18 February 1951, bringing a return of democracy in Nepal.

In 1952, the first scheduled domestic flights commenced to Bhairahawa, Biratnagar, Pokhara and Simara.

On 15 June 1955, the airport was inaugurated by King Mahendra and renamed Tribhuvan Airport in memory of the king's father. The airport was again renamed to Tribhuvan International Airport in 1964.

In 1957, the original 3,700 feet (1,100 m) grass runway 16/34 was re-laid in concrete. In 1964, the former runway 16/34 was abandoned for a newer 6,600 feet (2,000 m) runway 02/20. The new runway was extended from 6,600 to 10,000 feet (2,012 to 3,048 m) with the joint effort of the Asian Development Bank (ADB) and the OPEC in 1975. The runway was re-strengthened in 1981.

In 1961, Queen Elizabeth II landed in a Dakota plane for her first visit to Nepal, one of the most high-profile arrivals at the airport.

In 1967, Tribhuvan International Airport received its first jet aircraft, a Lufthansa Boeing 707 and 1972, the Nepali flag carrier, Royal Nepal Airlines commenced jet operations from the airport with a Boeing 727. The same year, Nepali personnel took over air traffic services from the Indian personnel.

In 1985, the extension apron of runway 02/20 was overlaid. The development of the terminal building was commenced in the same year. In 1987, the construction of the Airlines Operation and Control Tower building was completed and the taxiway was overlaid. In the same year, on 11 October, Nepal witnessed the first ever landing of the Concorde. In 1989, the construction of the terminal building was completed and on 18 February 1990, the newly built TIA complex was officially inaugurated by King Birendra Bir Bikram Shah.

In 1992, Necon Air, Nepal's first private airline commenced domestic operations from TIA with a Hawker Siddeley HS 748.

In 1997, airport surveillance radar (ASR) and secondary surveillance radar (SSR) came into the operation. The installation of radar surveillance was proposed by Japan in 1994, following the crash of Thai Airways Flight 311 and Pakistan International Airlines Flight 268 in 1992, which together claimed the lives of 280 people, including 17 high-level Japanese diplomats. On 9 September 1998, Prime Minister Girija Prasad Koirala officially inaugurated the radars.

In May 2007, Austrian Airlines discontinued its flight to Vienna, Nepal's last direct air link to Europe. In September 2013, Turkish Airlines launched direct flights from Istanbul to Kathmandu, re-establishing Nepal's connection with continental Europe.

In August 2013, the airport's only runway had to be closed for wide-body aircraft because the runway, which was in disrepair, could no longer withstand their weight.

In 2016, a new domestic terminal of 6300 m^{2} (67,813 sq. ft.) was opened, replacing the old terminal building of 2200 m^{2} (23,681 sq. ft.). The new facility is a temporary structure, and it cost Rs. 119.8 million to house passengers and office space for 15 local airlines.

In 2020, the runway was extended to 3,350 metres (10,990 ft 10 in), the departure hall was expanded to accommodate 1500 more passengers, the arrival area was extended to a lower level and the immigration hall was facelifted.

In 2022, the airport extended its domestic terminal, with the new section of the building being exclusively used by Buddha Air.

In September 2025, the airport was briefly shut down amidst anti-government protests.

== Facilities ==
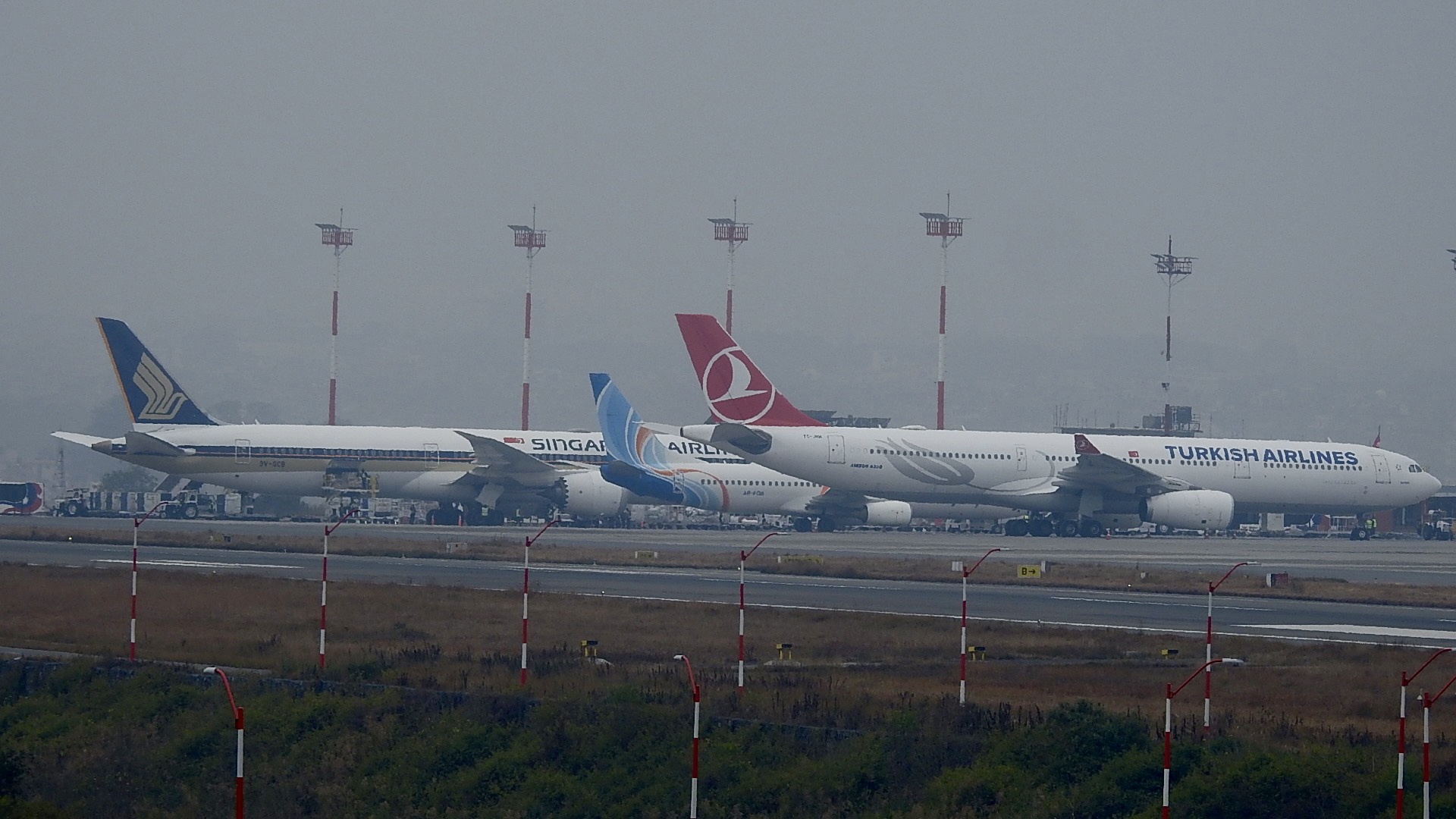
International parking bays

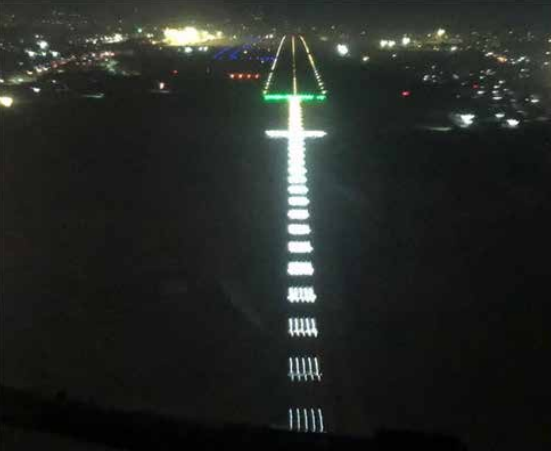
Airfield ground light at Tribhuvan Airport

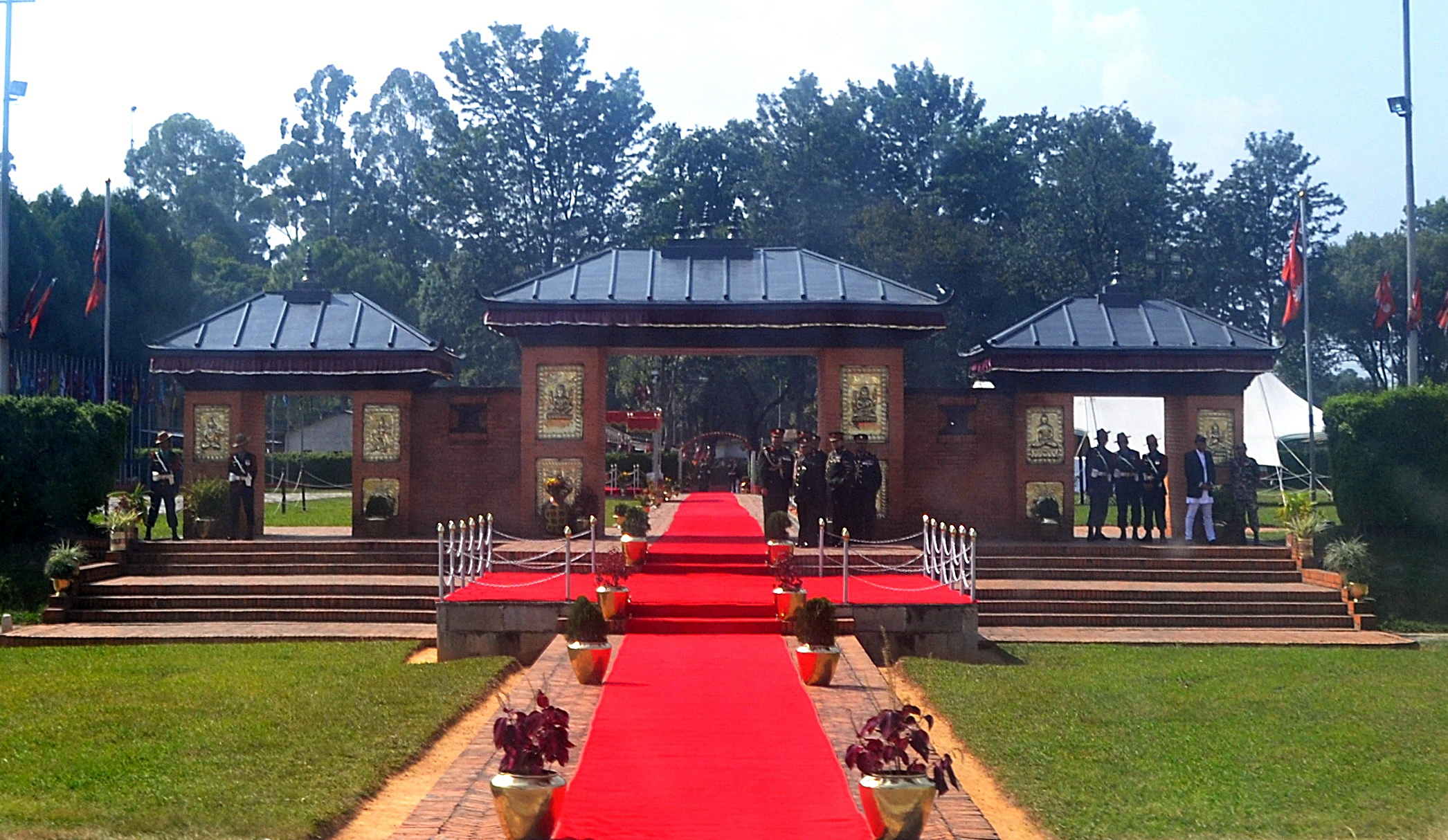
The Government of Nepal's VIP Terminal, where international state guests are welcomed

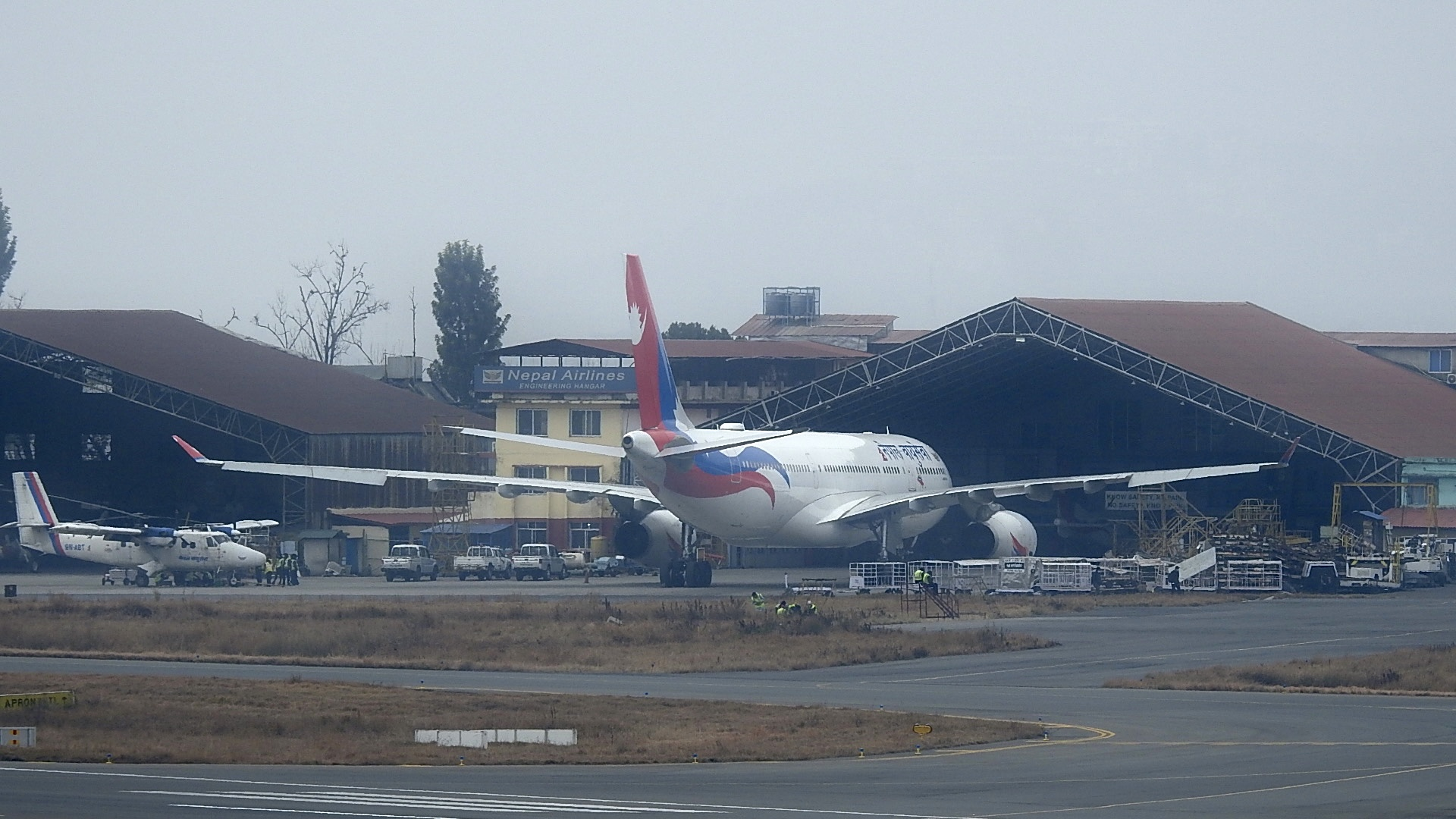
Nepal Airlines' hangar

=== Apron ===
The international apron at TIA can handle up to 17 aircraft, although only three can support wide-body category aircraft. There is also a bay at the eastern side of the airport that can hold two wide-body and two ATR 72 or similar type of aircraft. The eastern bay is used solely to park disabled or non-operational airplanes. With the completion of the construction of the two apron the parking capacity has increased to 17 aircraft.

The aprons at the domestic terminal have been accommodating up to 35 aircraft, despite its allowable capacity of only 17. The helipad at TIA can handle up to 17 helicopters.

=== Runway ===
The airport has a single 3,350-metre (10,990 ft 10 in) runway with a slope of 1.2% oriented at 02/20. There is no instrument landing system available. The bitumen runway with the strength of PCN 54F/A/W/T has the markings of the centerline, edge, touchdown zone and the threshold. It has a 60 meters (196 ft 10 in) Runway Strip and 240 meters (787 ft 5 in) Runway End Safety Area (RESA). The runway has five intersections with the taxiways. The taxiway G runs parallel to the runway but it does not connect the thresholds.

=== Aids to landing and navigation ===
There are two non-precision approaches available at the Kathmandu Airport; VHF omnidirectional range along a distance measuring equipment (VOR/DME) and Required Area Navigation (RNAV/RNP). The RNP AR approaches were designed for runways 02/20 by Navblue, to enhance the overall safety of aircraft operations by taking into account ATC constraints, aircraft energy management, and the terrain. Due to mountainous terrain, VOR/DME systems are installed at Kathmandu and Bhattedanda, along the extended approach path of runway 02 for better reception by aircraft. High intensity 870 m (2,854 ft 4 in) extended centerline lights are installed at the southern end of the airport to assist with the approach. The runway is equipped with high intensity centerline lights, bidirectional raised edge lights, the threshold lights and the runway end lights. Precision approach path indicator (PAPI) lights (3°) are installed as landing aids for the two runways 02/20. There is however no ILS system installed in the airport due to geographic conditions and technological complexities.

=== Terminals ===
There are two public terminals at the airport, one for international traffic and one for domestic traffic. The international terminal can handle up to 1350 departing passengers per hour, though it has been handling 2200 per hour at peak hours to suit the increasing demand of passengers.

The domestic terminal can be accessed using a free shuttle from the main airport gate. The terminal has a capacity of 765 passengers per hour.

A terminal for VIP guests is also operated by the Government of Nepal, where international state guests are welcomed. There are plans to construct a separate terminal for helicopter transportation.

Radisson Hotel Kathmandu operates an executive lounge for first and business class passengers of several airlines and Thai Airways operates a Royal Thai Silk lounge for its business-class passengers, as well as Star Alliance Gold card holders.

There are cafes and a duty-free shop in the departure area. There are also baggage help desk, senior citizens and parents rooms, banking services and pre-paid taxi services in the terminal building.

=== Aircraft maintenance ===
Nepal Airlines operates a large hangar between the international and domestic terminals. There are plans to upgrade and move this facility to the eastern side of the airside. Buddha Air operates a closed door hangar facility, which can accommodate narrow-body aircraft at the eastern side of the airport.

== Location and access ==
Tribhuvan International Airport is located 1 km (0.6 mi) from Pashupatinath Temple and 6 km (3.7 mi) east of the city centre and main tourist area Thamel.

It is in the middle of the junction of three ancient cities of Kathmandu, Bhaktapur and Patan. The airport is connected to major parts of Kathmandu valley by the ring road. There are a number of hotels located on the ring road adjacent to the airport, including the Summit Residency Airport Hotel, located about 200 m (0.1 mi) from the airport gate.

== Airlines and destinations ==
=== Passenger ===
Airlines	Destinations
Air Arabia	Abu Dhabi, Sharjah
Air China	Chengdu–Tianfu
Air India	Delhi–Indira Gandhi
Air India Express	Bengaluru
Batik Air Malaysia	Kuala Lumpur–International
Bhutan Airlines	Delhi–Indira Gandhi, Paro
Biman Bangladesh Airlines	Dhaka
Buddha Air	Bhadrapur, Bharatpur, Biratnagar, Dhangadhi, Janakpur, Jitpursimara, Kolkata, Nepalgunj, Pokhara–International, Rajbiraj, Siddharthanagar, Surkhet, Tumlingtar, Varanasi
Cathay Pacific	Hong Kong
China Eastern Airlines	Kunming
China Southern Airlines	Guangzhou
Drukair	Paro
flydubai	Dubai–International
Himalaya Airlines	Beijing–Daxing, Chongqing, Dammam, Dhaka, Doha, Dubai–International, Kuala Lumpur–International, Kuwait City, Lhasa, Qingdao, Riyadh, Shanghai–Pudong
IndiGo	Delhi–Indira Gandhi, Mumbai–Shivaji
Jazeera Airways	Kuwait City
Korean Air	Seoul–Incheon
Kuwait Airways	Kuwait City
Malaysia Airlines	Kuala Lumpur–International
Nepal Airlines	Bangkok–Suvarnabhumi, Bengaluru, Bhojpur, Dammam, Delhi–Indira Gandhi, Doha, Dubai–International, Guangzhou, Hong Kong, Ilam, Khanidanda, Khotehang, Kuala Lumpur–International, Mumbai–Shivaji, Phaplu, Phungling, Riyadh, Rukum, Rumjatar, Siddharthanagar, Tokyo–Narita, Tulsipur
Qatar Airways	Doha
SalamAir	Muscat
Saurya Airlines	Bhadrapur, Biratnagar, Dhangadhi, Nepalgunj, Pokhara, Siddharthanagar
Shree Airlines	Bhadrapur, Biratnagar, Dhangadhi, Janakpur, Nepalgunj, Pokhara–International, Rajbiraj, Siddharthanagar
Sichuan Airlines	Chengdu–Tianfu
Singapore Airlines	Singapore
Sita Air	Lukla, Nepalgunj, Phungling, Pokhara–International; Charter: Bhadrapur, Phaplu, Ramechhap,
SpiceJet	Delhi–Indira Gandhi
SriLankan Airlines	Colombo–Bandaranaike
Summit Air	Lukla, Nepalgunj, Phaplu, Phungling, Tumlingtar
Thai Airways International	Bangkok–Suvarnabhumi
Thai Lion Air	Bangkok–Don Mueang
Turkish Airlines	Istanbul
Yeti Airlines	Bhadrapur, Biratnagar, Janakpur, Jitpursimara, Lukla, Nepalgunj, Pokhara–International, Siddharthanagar, Tumlingtar

Buddha Air, Yeti Airlines, Shree Airlines and Sita Air also provide daily mountain sightseeing flights or Mount Everest sightseeing flights from Tribhuvan International Airport. They usually depart from the domestic terminal early morning and return to the airport one hour later.

The helicopter operators Air Dynasty, Manang Air, Prabhu Helicopter, Simrik Air, Shree Airlines and Fishtail Air offer helicopter operations from their respective hubs at Tribhuvan International Airport.

=== Cargo ===
Airlines	Destinations
Himalaya Airlines Cargo	Kunming, Nanning
Moalem Aviation	Dubai–International
SF Airlines	Chengdu–Shuangliu, Chengdu–Tianfu
SpiceXpress	Kolkata

== Statistics ==
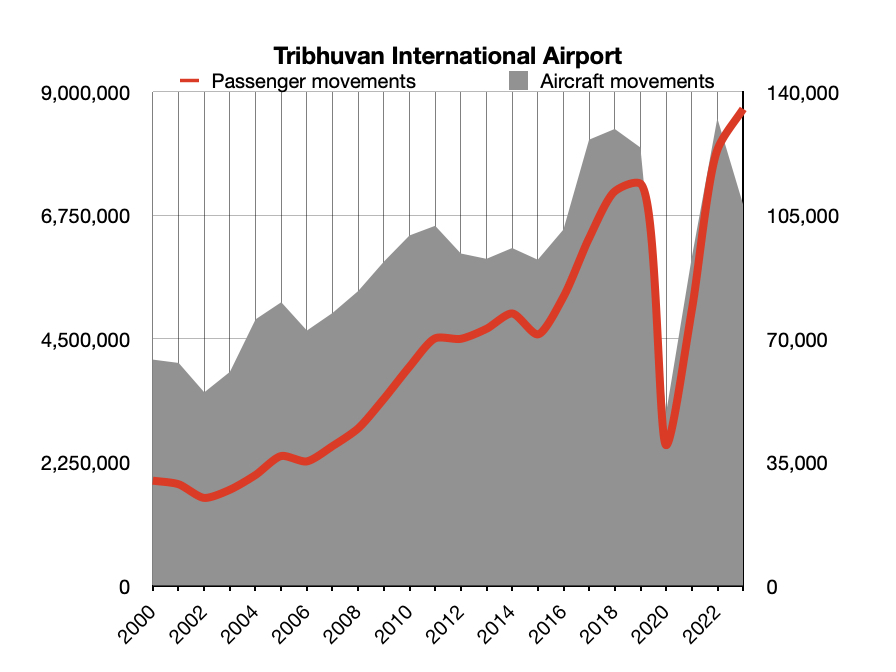
Year	Passenger movements	Aircraft movements
2000	1,914,349	64,103
2001	▼1,849,766	▼63,159
2002	▼1,600,309	▼54,825
2003	▲1,748,082	▲60,648
2004	▲2,016,850	▲75,533
2005	▲2,362,885	▲80,379
2006	▼2,265,758	▼72,348
2007	▲2,543,482	▲77,342
2008	▲2,867,216	▲83,562
2009	▲3,405,015	▲91,884
2010	▲3,991,259	▲99,317
2011	▲4,508,962	▲102,052
2012	▼4,500,176	▼94,197
2013	▲4,682,906	▼92,685
2014	▲4,962,205	▲95,744
2015	▼4,581,210	▼92,428
2016	▲5,268,338	▲100,994
2017	▲6,339,235	▲126,469
2018	▲7,190,238	▲129,513
2019	▲7,327,042	▼124,255
2020	▼2,562,182	▼48,857
2021	▲5,033,871	▲92,932
2022	▲7,954,495	▲132,514
2023	▲8,691,443	▼108,202
2024	▲9,482,793	▲135,977

=== Airline market share ===
Top international carriers serving KTM (2023)
Rank	Carrier	Number of passengers	Change from previous year
1	Nepal Airlines	645,166	▲11.68
2	Qatar Airways	627,081	▲1.08
3	(Nepal) Himalaya Airlines	462,764	▲20.27
4	(India) IndiGo	449,992	▲107.78
5	(United Arab Emirates) Flydubai	368,739	▲4.25

Top domestic airlines serving KTM (2020)
Rank	Carrier	Number of passengers	Passenger share
1	Buddha Air	765,708	52.8%
2	Yeti Airlines	380,379	26.2%
3	Shree Airlines	230,646	15.9%
4	Nepal Airlines	23,657	1.63%
5	Saurya Airlines	16,459	1.14%

== Expansion ==
According to the CAAN Aviation Report – 2017, Tribhuvan International will undergo expansions under Transport Project Preparatory Facility funded partly by the Asian Development Bank. Major works include:

- Construction of a parallel taxiway system and side strip
- Construction of a new international terminal building
- Reconfiguration of existing international terminal building to domestic terminal building
- Relocation of Nepal Airlines hangar
- Relocation of Nepal Army infrastructure, hangar and other associated work

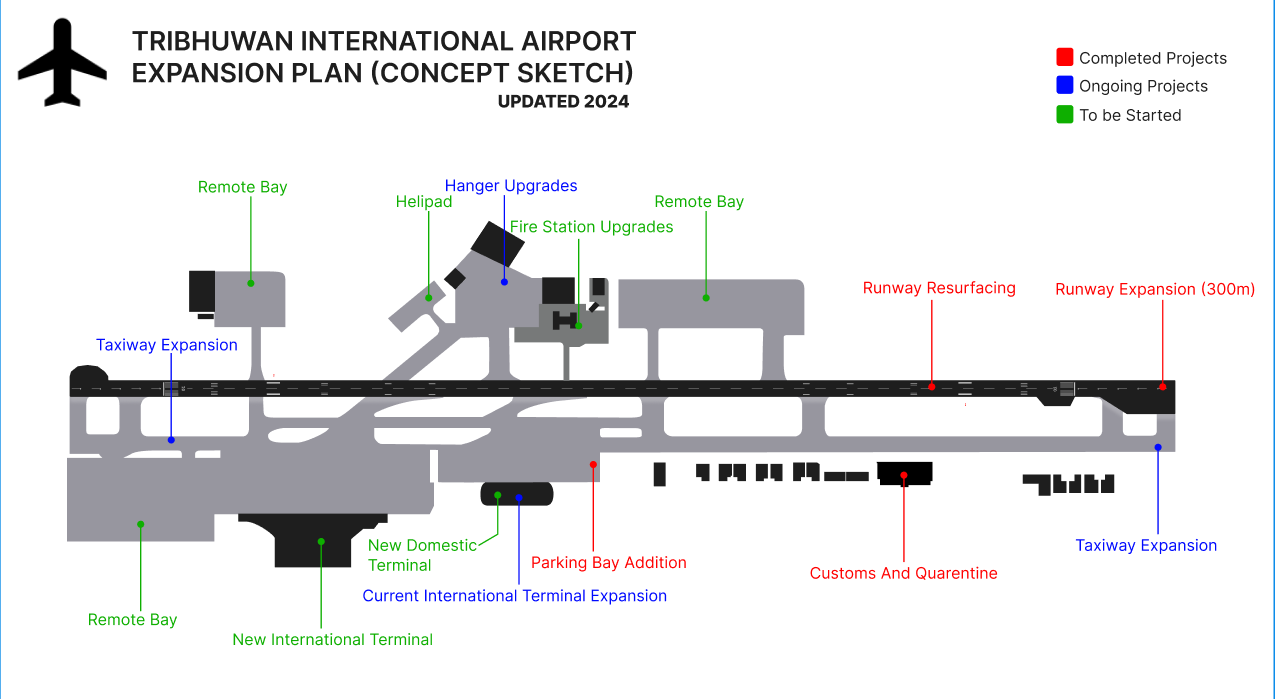
Project conditions of TIA expansion (as of Jan 2024)

== Ground transportation ==
Sajha Yatayat buses connect the airport's international terminal to Kathmandu's city centre, and Lalitpur's city centre. Meter and prepaid taxis are available at both terminals at all hours.

== Incidents and accidents ==
- On 10 May 1973, a McDonnell Douglas DC-8 operated by Thai Airways overran the runway on landing, with 100 passengers and 10 crew on board. There was one fatality.
- On 31 July 1992, an Airbus A310-304, operating as Thai Airways International Flight 311 crashed into a mountain while approaching Kathmandu, killing all 113 people on board.
- On 28 September 1992, an Airbus A300 (an A300B4-103 model) operating as Pakistan International Airlines Flight 268 crashed while approaching Kathmandu, killing all 167 on board, making it the worst air accident in Nepal.
- On 17 January 1995, a de Havilland Canada DHC-6 Twin Otter operating as Royal Nepal Airlines Flight 133 from Kathmandu to Rumjatar, had problems getting airborne at Tribhuvan International Airport. The aircraft struck the airfield perimeter fence and plunged into fields. Of three crew and 21 passengers on board, one crew member and one passenger were killed.
- On 7 July 1999, a Boeing 727-200F operated by Lufthansa Cargo crashed in the Champadevi hills at an altitude of 7550 feet, five minutes after takeoff, when it should have been at an altitude of 9500 feet. All five crew members on board were killed.
- On 5 September 1999, a BAe 748-501 Super 2B operating as Necon Air Flight 128 from Pokhara to Kathmandu, crashed while approaching Tribhuvan International Airport. The aircraft collided with a communication tower of Nepal Telecommunication Corporation and crashed in a wooded area 25 km west of Kathmandu. All 10 passengers and 5 crew were killed.
- On 26 December 1999, an Airbus A300B2-101 operating as Indian Airlines Flight 814 was hijacked en route from Kathmandu to Delhi. The aircraft ended up in Kandahar, Afghanistan. Indian Airlines suspended all flights to and from Nepal for some time, fearing a lack of security at check-in.
- On 24 December 2008, a de Havilland Canada DHC-6 Twin Otter operated by Nepal Airlines ran off the runway during takeoff
- On 24 August 2010, a Dornier 228 operating as Agni Air Flight 101 crashed into hills outside Kathmandu in heavy rain. All on board (three crew, 11 passengers) were killed. The plane, crashed near Shikharpur village, 80 km (50 mi) south of Kathmandu. The aircraft had left Tribhuvan International Airport, bound for Tenzing-Hillary Airport.
- On 25 September 2011, a Beechcraft 1900D operating as Buddha Air Flight 103, struck terrain while approaching Tribhuvan International Airport. There were 16 passengers and three crew members on board. Initial reports stated there was one survivor, who died en route to hospital. At the time of the crash, the weather was overcast with very low clouds and flights were operating under visual flight rules. The aircraft was on the base leg of the approach following a sightseeing flight.
- On 28 September 2012, a Dornier 228 operating as Sita Air Flight 601, crashed soon after take-off, after apparently hitting a vulture. 16 passengers and three crew members were killed.
- On 4 March 2015, an Airbus A330-300 operated by Turkish Airlines veered off the runway after attempting to land in dense fog. The aircraft had been circling for 30 minutes and was making its second landing attempt, after a previous aborted attempt due to poor visibility. The aircraft skidded into soft grass causing the nose wheel to collapse and the airport to temporarily close to all international flights. All 224 passengers and 11 crew members evacuated the aircraft safely, with one minor injury reported.
- On 12 March 2018, a Bombardier Dash 8 Q400 operating as US-Bangla Airlines Flight 211, carrying 67 passengers and 4 crew veered off the runway while landing then crashed on the east side of Tribhuvan International Airport before catching fire. 47 passengers and 4 crew were killed.
- On 19 April 2018, a Boeing 737-900ER operated by Malindo Air on a scheduled flight to Kuala Lumpur International Airport Malaysia, overran the runway after a high-speed rejected takeoff. The aircraft skidded roughly 250 feet (76 meters) south of the runway end and stopped along a grassy area between two runways. All 132 passengers and 7 crew members escaped without injuries. Damage to the aircraft was minor, and the runway was closed for several hours until the plane was removed. The flight crew opted to abort the takeoff due to a warning indicated the aircraft was not correctly configured.
- On 1 September 2018, a BAe Jetstream 41 operated by Yeti Airlines en route from Nepalgunj skidded off the runway, seconds after touching down. All 21 passengers and the crew of three evacuated the aircraft safely without injuries, but the aircraft was written off. Slippery runway due to rainfall was reported to be the cause of the incident.
- On 12 July 2019, a Yeti Airlines ATR 72-500, which was flying from Nepalgunj, skidded off the runway as it landed at Tribhuvan International Airport. There were 68 people aboard, including four crew members; all of them were able to safely exit the plane, but two passengers were minorly injured.
- On 6 May 2022, Singapore Airlines Flight 439, a Boeing 737-800, sustained a tailstrike during takeoff from runway 20. The resulting incident depressurized the aircraft and forced it to divert to Kolkata, India. There were no injuries among the 165 passengers and 8 crew members on board. The tailstrike occurred during the takeoff at the airport was due to over-rotation by the PF, coupled with a likely tailwind with a component of about 10 knots along the runway. The rotation pitch rate was, at times, greater than 5° per second as recorded by the FDR. The pitch angle of 11.07° recorded also exceeded the 7° – 9° normal pitch angle range.
- On 24 July 2024, a Bombardier CRJ200 operated by Saurya Airlines crashed during takeoff, killing 18 of the 19 people on board. The cause of the crash is still under investigation.

== See also ==
- List of airports in Nepal
