= Mountain Air (Nepal) =

Nepalese airline

IATA	ICAO	Call sign
-	-	-
- Founded: 2000
- Ceased operations: November 2002
- AOC #: 026/98
- Fleet size: 2 (before repossession in November 2002)
- Destinations: Nepal cities including: • Bhairawa • Biratnagar • Nepalgunj • Pokhara
- Headquarters: Kathmandu, Nepal

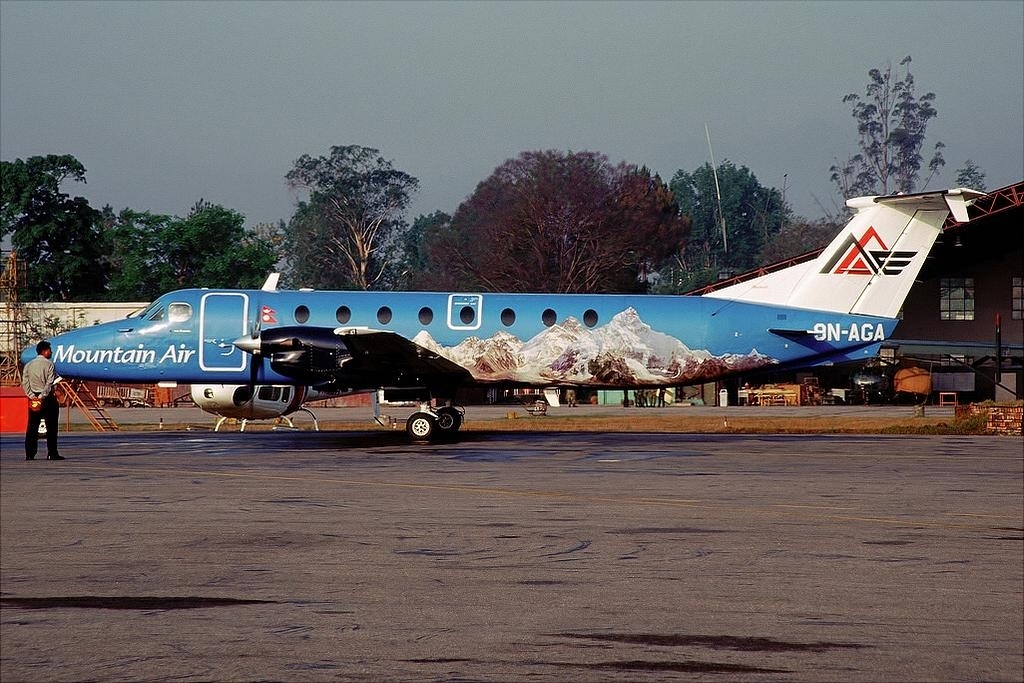
Mountain Air Beechcraft 1900C at Tribhuvan International Airport in 2002.

Mountain Air was an airline based in Nepal. Its aircraft were re-possessed in 2002.

== History ==
Mountain Air was established in April 2000. In November 2002 the Raytheon took back possession of two aircraft from Mountain Air because the airline defaulted on the aircraft-leasing arrangements.

== Destinations ==
Gorkha Airlines regularly served the following destinations, which were cancelled either at the closure of operations or before:

City	Airport	Notes	Refs
Bhairahawa	Gautam Buddha Airport		
Biratnagar	Biratnagar Airport		
Kathmandu	Tribhuvan International Airport	Hub	
Nepalgunj	Nepalgunj Airport		
Pokhara	Pokhara Airport		

Mountain Air also operated scheduled mountain sightseeing flights from Kathmandu to Mount Everest range. The flights usually departed in the early morning hours and return to the airport one hour later.

== Fleet ==
At the time of closure, Mountain Air operated the following aircraft:

Gorkha Airlines Fleet
Aircraft	In fleet	Notes
Raytheon Beech 1900C Airliners	2	
