= Taplejung Airport =

Taplejung Airport/Suketar Airport ताप्लेजुङ्ग विमानस्थल/सुकेटार विमानस्थल
- IATA: TPJ; ICAO: VNTJ

Summary
- Airport type: Public
- Owner: Government of Nepal
- Operator: Civil Aviation Authority of Nepal
- Serves: Taplejung district, Nepal
- Coordinates: 27°21′3″N 87°41′42″E

Map
- Location of airport in Nepal

Runways
Direction	Length		Surface
Direction	m	ft	Surface
07/25	700	2,297	Asphalt

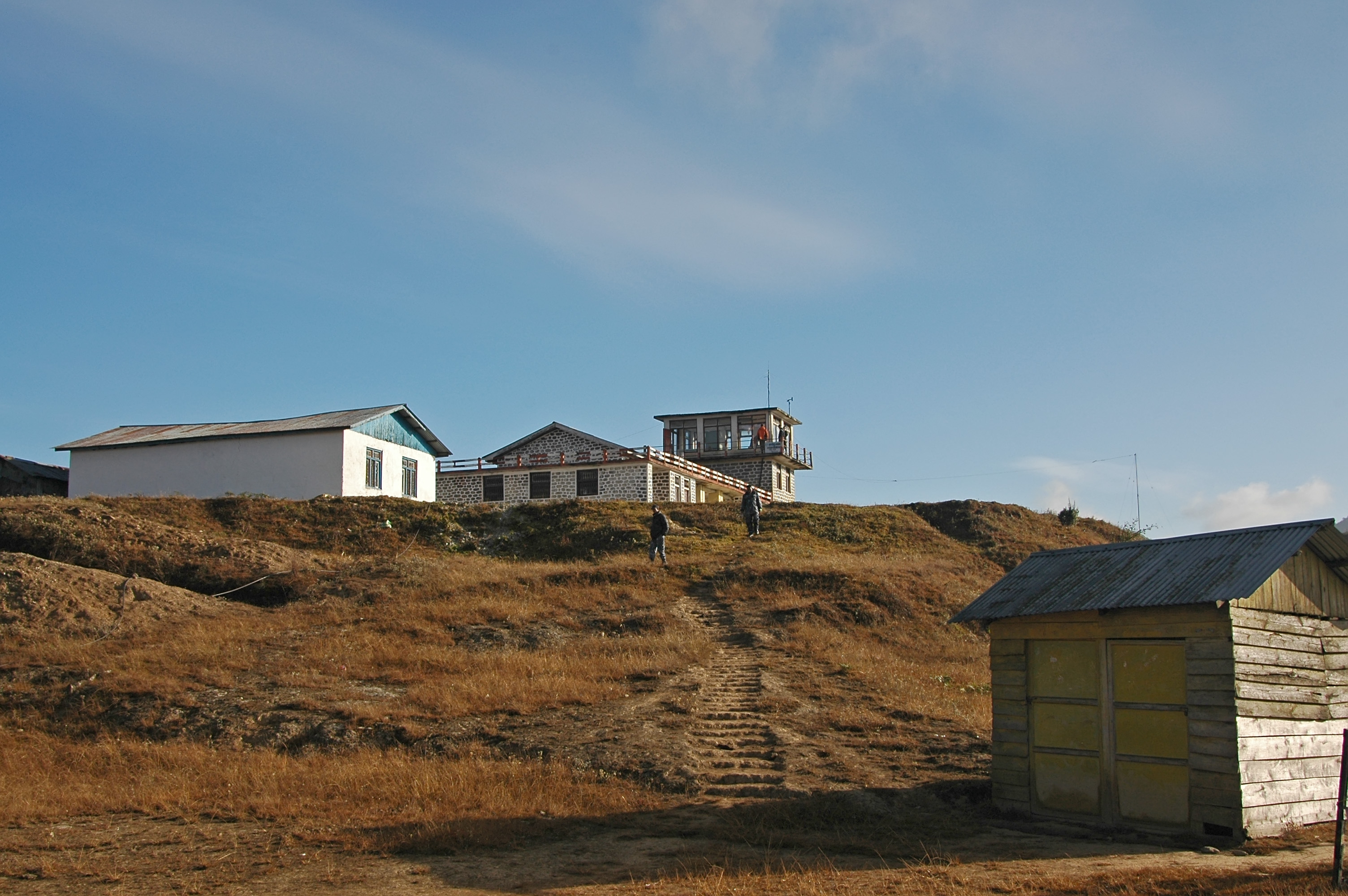
Tower of Taplejung Airport

Taplejung Airport (IATA: TPJ, ICAO: VNTJ), also known as Suketar Airport, is a domestic airport located in Phungling serving Taplejung District, a district in Koshi Province in Nepal. It is the main tourist gateway on the Kangchenjunga mountainous area and Pathibhara Devi Temple.

== History ==
The airport started operations in October 1976. After its runway was blacktopped, Taplejung Airport restarted scheduled service in 2016. In 2018, plans were announced to upgrade the runway yet again.

== Airlines and destinations ==
Airlines	Destinations
Nepal Airlines	Kathmandu
Summit Air	Kathmandu
Sita Air	Kathmandu (resumes 18 January 2023)
Tara Air	Charter: Kathmandu
