= Saurya Airlines =

Nepalese airline

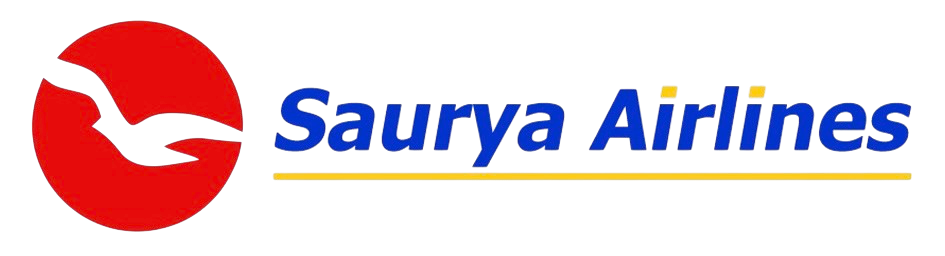

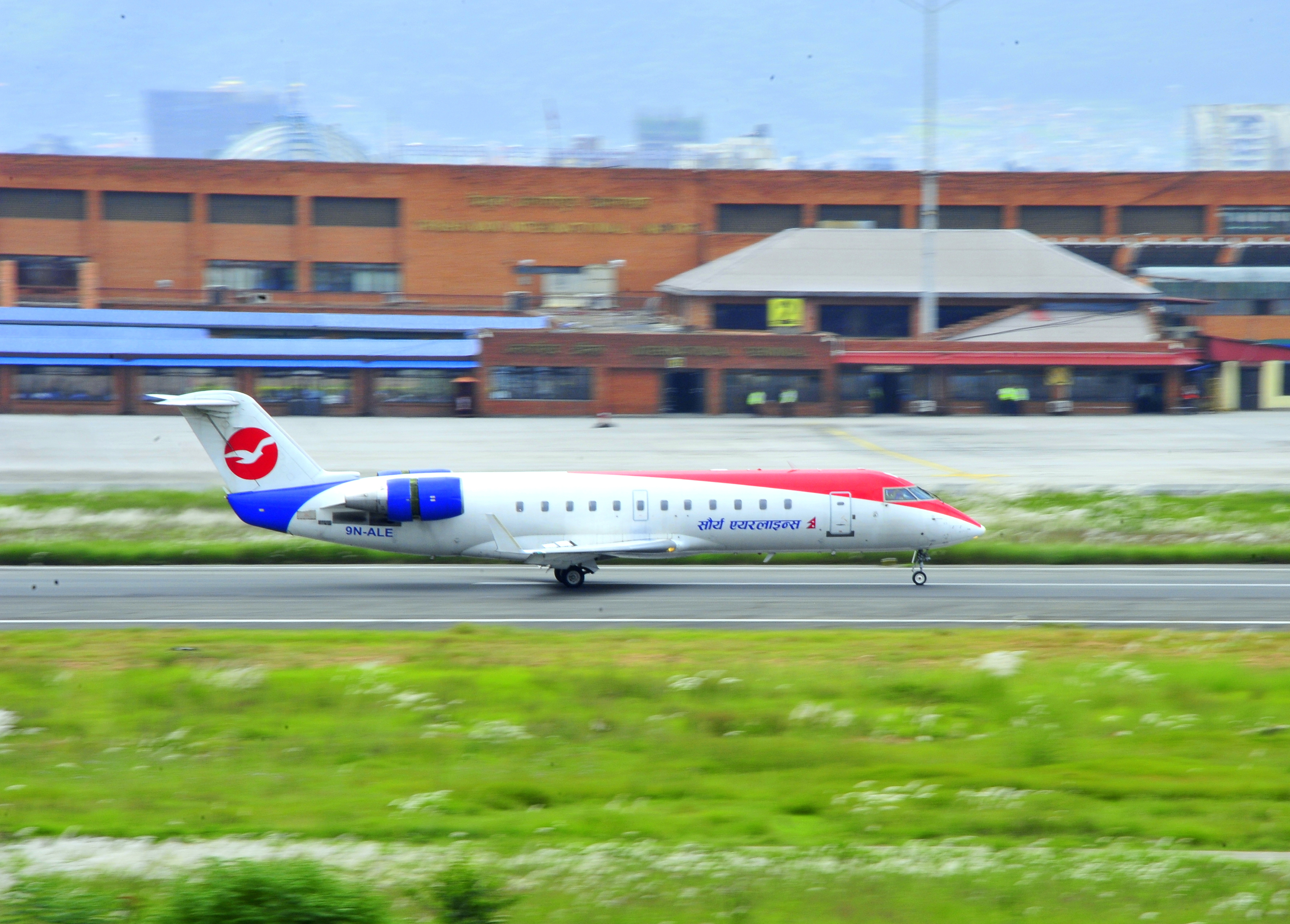
- CRJ-200 9N-ALE at Tribhuvan Int'l Airport
IATA	ICAO	Call sign
S1	SAU	SAURYA AIRLINES
- Founded: 2014; 12 years ago
- Commenced operations: 17 November 2014; 11 years ago
- AOC #: 083/2014
- Hubs: Tribhuvan Airport, Kathmandu
- Focus cities: Biratnagar, Bhadrapur
- Frequent-flyer program: Saurya Saarathi
- Fleet size: 2 (after 24 July 2024 plane crash)
- Destinations: 2
- Headquarters: Kathmandu, Nepal
- Key people: Dipak Pokharel (Chairman)
- Website: sauryaairlines.com

Saurya Airlines Pvt. Ltd (Nepali: सौर्य एयरलाईन्स) is an airline based in Kathmandu, Nepal. As of August 2017, the airline served five destinations across three provinces of Nepal from its hub at Tribhuvan International Airport, operating a small fleet of Bombardier CRJ-200 aircraft. Saurya Airlines was the first airline to operate the Canadair Regional Jet in Nepal, also becoming the second airline in Nepal after Cosmic Air to operate a jet engine aircraft on the domestic routes.

== History ==
Saurya Airlines bought its first aircraft, a Bombardier CRJ-200, on 18 August 2014 and commenced its first operation on 17 November 2014 by conducting a mountain flight and a round trip to Biratnagar Airport from Kathmandu Airport after it was forced to keep its new plane grounded for nearly three months due to lengthy paperwork. The company later added a daily service to Bhadrapur making it its second southeastern destination. On 22 June 2015, Saurya Airlines launched flights to Nepalgunj which is now discontinued.

At the beginning of 2016, Saurya Airlines was constrained to operate charter flights as per the regulations of Civil Aviation Authority of Nepal after the company failed to meet the minimum required number of aircraft needed to operate as a scheduled passenger carrier. However, the company managed to provide the service to the passengers by operating scheduled charter flights. In 2016, Saurya Airlines served 90,205 passengers with the growth rate of 3.76 percent from the previous year.

In March 2017, Saurya Airlines added a second CRJ-200 to its fleet, and regained the certificate to operate scheduled flights again. This aircraft (registered 9N-AME) was painted with a "Tata Tiago livery" as per the agreement with Sipradi Trading, making the airline the first Nepalese fixed-wing aircraft company to wear the international trademark on aircraft livery.

In 2018, the airline was grounded by Tribhuvan International Airport, as it owed 30 million Nepali rupees in service charges to the airport. In March 2019, the airline cleared its dues and restarted its flight operations.

Also in 2018, the airline was sold to a group of Non Resident Nepalis for 320 million Nepali rupees. However, in 2019, the ownership changed again, when the Indian Kuber Group acquired the airline for 630 million Nepali rupees. In July 2021, some reports indicated that the airline would rebrand itself as Kuber Airlines.

On 24 July 2024, 18 of the company's employees – including much of its senior management – were killed in a crash at Kathmandu. The following day, the airline suspended all flights due to the lack of aircraft and skilled personnel, and its certification to operate was subsequently suspended.

On 12 February 2026, it was reported that the airline had been approved to restart flight operations.

== Destinations ==
Saurya Airlines served these destinations as of January 2023:

City	Airport	Notes
Bhadrapur	Chandragadhi Airport	—
Biratnagar	Biratnagar Airport	—
Dhangadhi	Dhangadhi Airport	Terminated
Kathmandu	Tribhuvan International Airport	Hub
Nepalgunj	Nepalgunj Airport	Terminated
Pokhara	Pokhara Airport	Terminated
Pokhara	Pokhara International Airport	Terminated
Siddharthanagar	Gautam Buddha Airport	Terminated

== Fleet ==
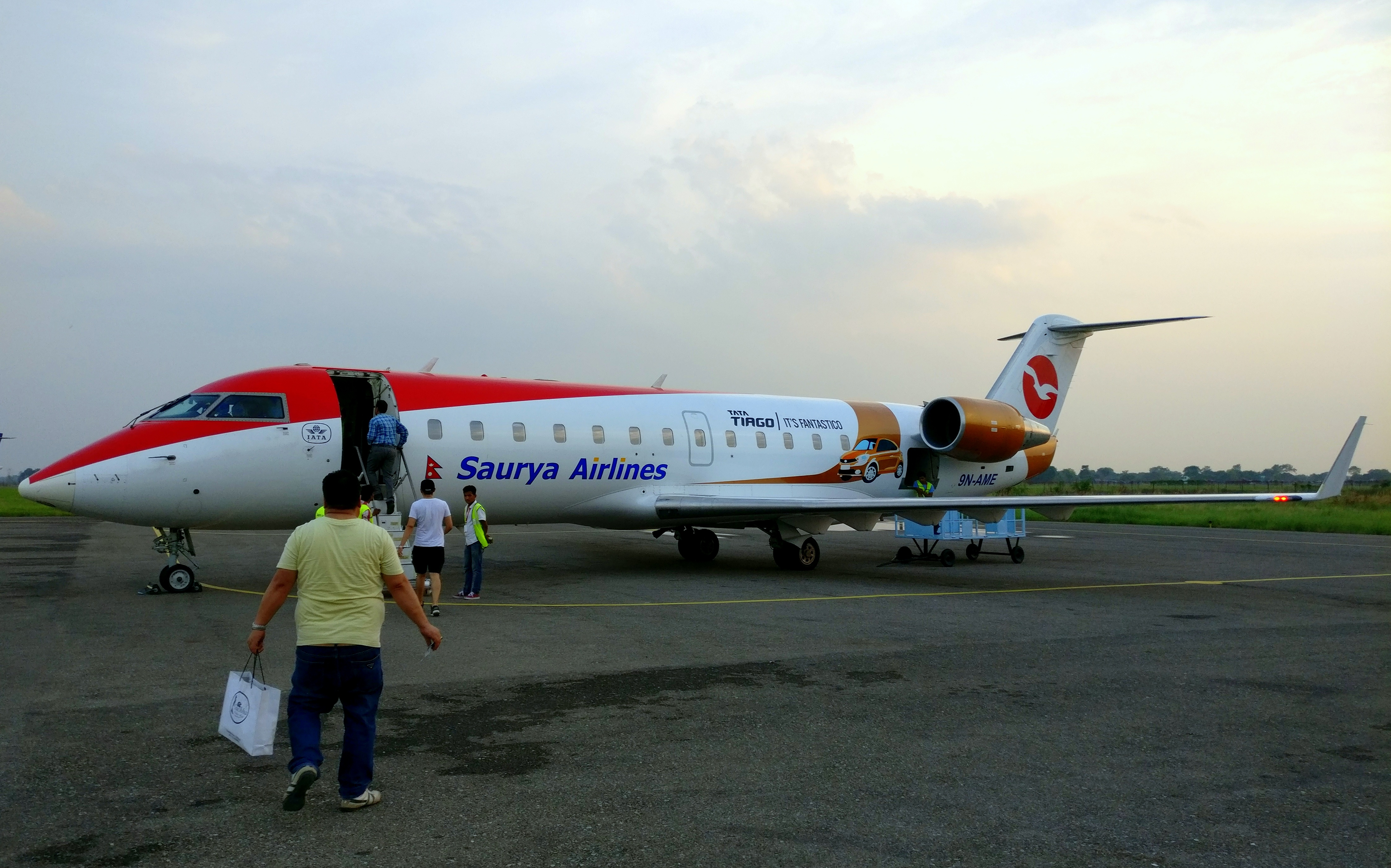
Saurya Airlines CRJ-200 (9N-AME) in the Tata Tiago livery at Siddharthanagar Airport in 2017. This plane crashed on 24 July 2024.

As of August 2025, Saurya Airlines operates the following aircraft:

Saurya Airlines fleet
Aircraft	In fleet	Orders	Passengers	Notes
Aircraft	In fleet	Orders	Y	Notes
Bombardier CRJ200LR/ER	2	0	50	
ATR 72-600	0	3		
Total	2			

== Accidents and incidents ==
- 24 July 2024 – a Saurya Airlines CRJ200 (9N-AME) aircraft carrying 19 people on a special flight to a maintenance facility, crashed during takeoff in Kathmandu, killing all of those aboard except the captain.
