= Pokhara International Airport =

Airport in Nepal

Pokhara International Airport पोखरा अन्तर्राष्ट्रिय विमानस्थल
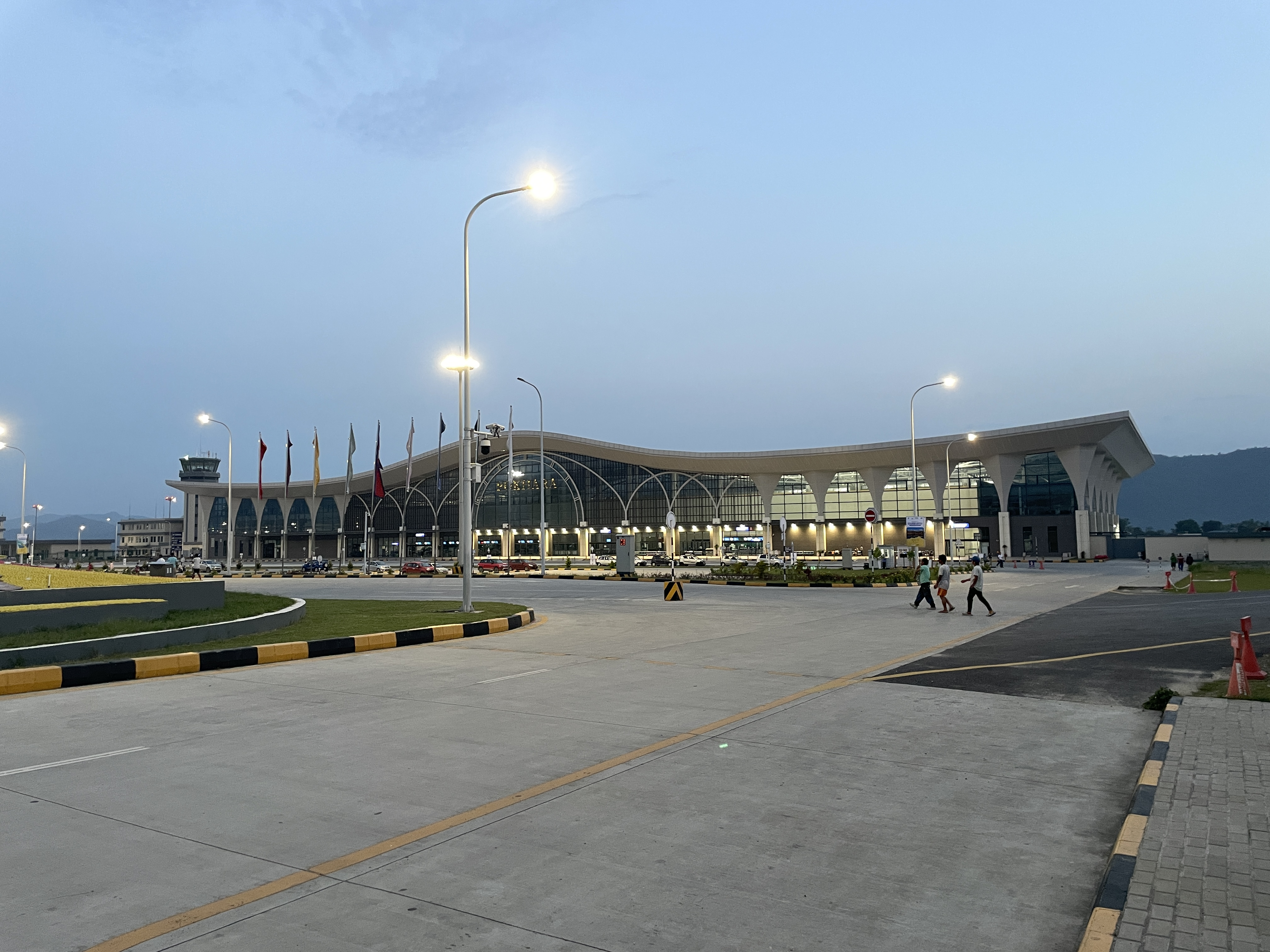

- IATA: PHH; ICAO: VNPR

Summary
- Airport type: Public
- Owner: Government of Nepal
- Operator: Civil Aviation Authority of Nepal
- Serves: Pokhara
- Location: Pokhara, Gandaki Province, Nepal
- Opened: 1 January 2023; 3 years ago
- Elevation AMSL: 800 m (2,600 ft)
- Coordinates: 28.189690°N 84.014893°E
- Website: pia.caanepal.gov.np

Map
- Location within Gandaki Pradesh Pokhara International Airport (Nepal)

Runways
Direction	Length		Surface
Direction	ft	m	Surface
12/30	8,202	2,500	Concrete

Statistics
- Land area: 200 ha

Pokhara International Airport (Nepali: पोखरा अन्तर्राष्ट्रिय विमानस्थल) (IATA: PHH, ICAO: VNPR) is an international airport located at Chhinedanda in Pokhara, Gandaki Province, Nepal. It is situated 3 km (1.9 mi) east of the old domestic airport, which it has largely replaced for regular commercial operations. The airport is Nepal's third international airport and officially began operations on 1 January 2023. While most domestic flights have been shifted to the new airport, STOL operations to Jomsom still continue to be operated from the old Pokhara Airport. As of September 2026, the airport handles primarily domestic flights, along with some chartered international flights. On 23 September 2026, flydubai launched the airport's first daily scheduled international service, connecting Pokhara to Dubai.

== History ==
The idea of constructing an international airport in Pokhara was first proposed in 1971. In 1976, the Government of Nepal acquired land for the project. In 1989, the Japan International Cooperation Agency conducted a feasibility study. However, the project stalled and was only reinstated in 2009 following a new air travel agreement between India and Nepal.

In 2013, the Civil Aviation Authority of Nepal signed an agreement with China CAMC Engineering for the construction of the airport. Construction began in April 2016 and was expected to be completed after five years in 2021, with an estimated cost of around US$305 million.The Export-Import Bank of China provided approximately US$215 million as a preferential loan to Nepal which included subsidizing part of the loan interest. Additionally, the Asian Development Bank contributed US$37 million in loans and grants while the OPEC Fund for International Development provided a US$11 million loan. The initial bid was nearly double Nepal's original projection, but the cost was later reduced by about 30 percent to US$216 million.

In April 2016, then Prime Minister KP Sharma Oli laid the foundation stone of the airport, aiming to commence operations on 10 July 2021. In 2020, a proposal emerged to open both new international airports in Nepal, Pokhara and Gautam Buddha Airport, on the same day. However, it was revealed in 2020 that the nearby Rithepani Hill, located at the eastern end of the runway, needed to be flattened to facilitate aircraft approach. This decision faced severe protests from locals, delaying the flattening work until late 2022.

Due to the COVID-19 pandemic in Nepal, the construction deadline was extended until 2022. In October 2021, officials confirmed that the airport would open in two phases: domestic flights would begin in January 2022, followed by international flights in April 2022.

In 2022, it was announced that calibration flights would begin in October 2022. They would later take place in late November 2022.

In mid-2022, the Civil Aviation Authority of Nepal pushed back the opening to December 2022 due to a lack of flight inspections. On 8 August 2022, the Civil Aviation Authority of Nepal set the official opening date for 1 January 2023.

The airport was inaugurated by Prime Minister Pushpa Kamal Dahal on 1 January 2023. To celebrate the occasion, the city of Pokhara declared the day a public holiday. The first flight to arrive at the airport was a Buddha Air flight carrying the Prime Minister and his delegation.

Development of the airport continued immediately after the opening with an initial lack of customs facilities and a fuel depot — initially, fuel was being carried from the old Pokhara Airport on trucks. The airport was also opened before it was certified for IFR flights, a contributing factor to the crash of Yeti Airlines Flight 691 only one month later.

In June 2023, the airport saw its first international flight before which it only handled domestic services. The first international flight was a Sichuan Airlines flight from China in an Airbus A319. The flight was chartered and funded by China, and the passengers were Chinese athletes and officials who came for a good-will dragon-boat race.

=== Controversy ===
In October 2023, The New York Times reported concerns about Pokhara International Airport's construction, noting high costs and potential gaps in standard engineering practices, such as soil and rainfall considerations. A consultant suggested limited oversight contributed to costs being significantly higher than typical market estimates.

The airport was financed with a concessional loan from the Export-Import Bank of China, with about 25% of the loan interest-free and the remaining portion carrying an annual interest rate of around 2%, repayable over 20 years with a 7-year grace period. Despite the favorable terms, the airport's financial sustainability is uncertain. Himalaya Airlines launched a weekly scheduled flight between Pokhara and Lhasa on 31 March 2025 — the airport's first scheduled passenger service since opening — but the route had been suspended by mid-2026 due to low passenger numbers.. The project has been described as a potential debt risk. The Times of India compared it to Pakistan's Gwadar Port where Chinese loans remain outstanding despite limited commercial activity.

In November 2023, Nepal's Commission for the Investigation of Abuse of Authority, the country's anti-corruption agency, opened an investigation into the airport's construction. That investigation led to formal corruption charges at Nepal's Special Court. In December 2025, the Commission for the Investigation of Abuse of Authority (CIAA) filed a case against 55 individuals, including five former ministers and ten former secretaries, seeking recovery of over Rs8 billion from each defendant over alleged irregularities in the $215.96 million airport project. A separate case followed a week later against former project chief Binesh Munankarmi over assets disproportionate to his income. In March 2026, the CIAA filed a third case against 21 individuals, including two Chinese officials from contractor China CAMC Engineering, alleging embezzlement of Rs461.5 million during construction.

== Facilities ==
The airport is built to the category 4D standard, set by the ICAO, IATA, and FAA.

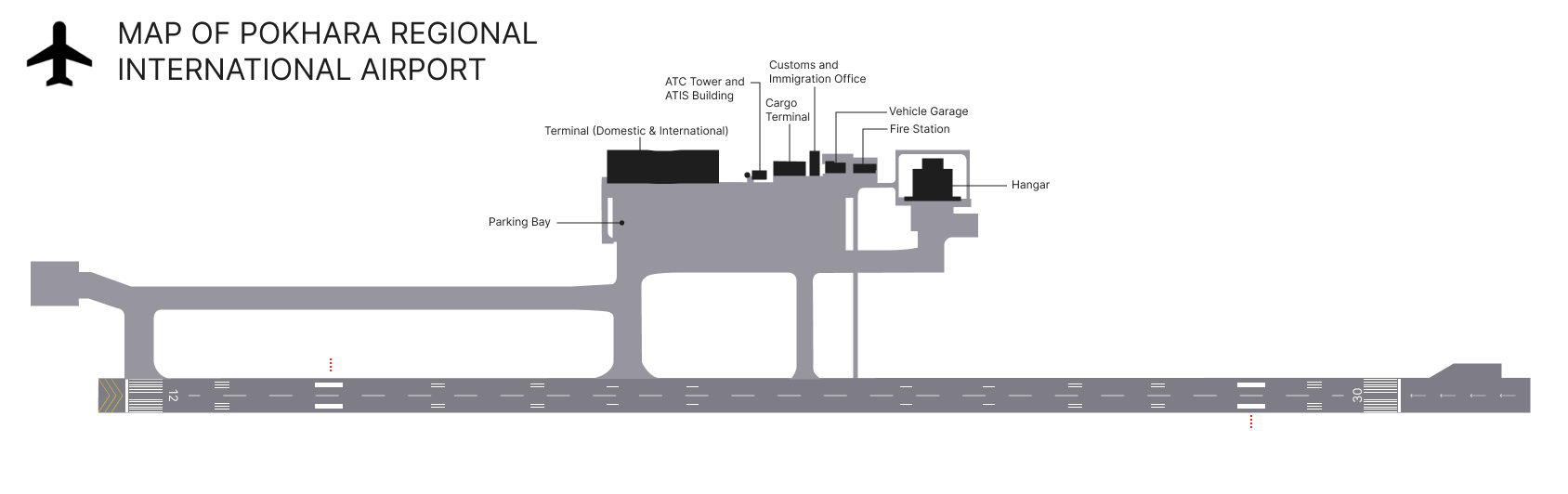
The map of Pokhara International Airport with its facilities labelled.

=== Apron ===
The apron of the airport covers an area of 5,519 m^{2} (59,410 sq ft) which can handle up to three narrowbody aircraft, four ATR-72 size propeller planes and four smaller STOL aircraft. It is also equipped with two aerobridges.

=== Runway ===
The airport has a single 2,500 m (8,202 ft 1 in) long runway with a width of 45 metres (147 ft 8 in). It has an east-west orientation with a 330-metre (1,082 ft 8 in) runway strip. The airport has a concrete runway and has the markings of the centerline, edge, touchdown zone, and threshold. The taxiway (1.2 kilometres (0.75 mi) long and 23 metres (75 ft 6 in) wide) is built from the runway's central line on the north side parallel to the runway. The airside infrastructure works also include two 182.5-by-23-metre (598 ft 9 in × 75 ft 6 in) exit taxiways, access roads, and aerodrome pavement. The runway is capable of handling aircraft such as the Airbus A320 and the Boeing 737. All international landings and takeoffs will be done using the Eastern part of the runway. Domestic flights and landings will use both the Eastern and Western sides.

=== Aids to navigation ===
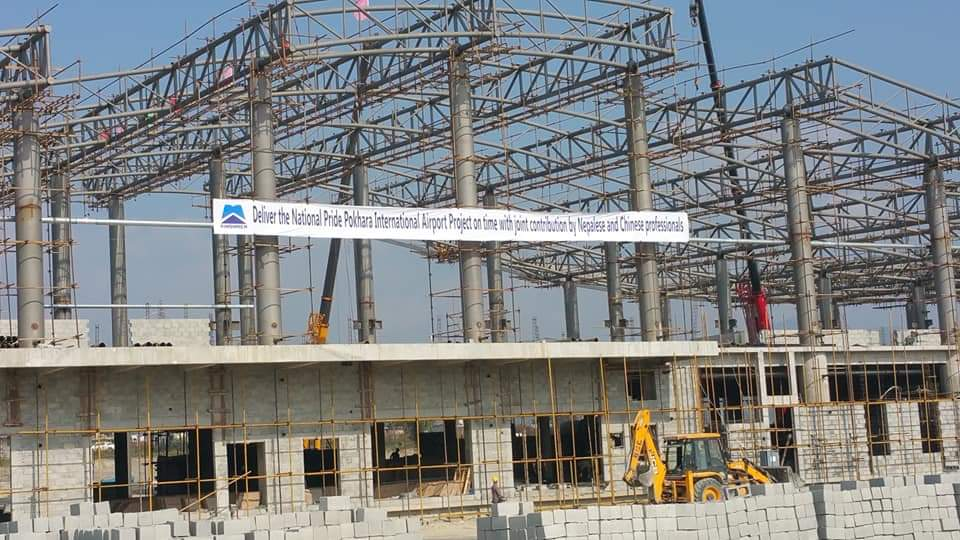
The airport's terminal during construction

The airport features a 2,500-square-metre (27,000 sq ft) Air Traffic Control (ATC) tower, operations building and an air navigation unit. There are two non-precision approaches available at the Pokhara Airport; VHF omnidirectional range along a distance measuring equipment (VOR/DME) and Required Area Navigation (RNAV/RNP). The airport is also equipped with a CAT-I ILS system, which includes equipment such as the localizer and the glide path to help aircraft in navigation. The ATC tower also supports a Wide Area Multilateration (WAM) based surveillance system, the first of its kind in Nepal.

High intensity 870 metres (2,854 ft 4 in) extended centerline lights are installed at the southern end of the airport to assist with the approach. It is equipped with advanced communication, navigation, and monitoring equipment and a high-end navigational lighting system.

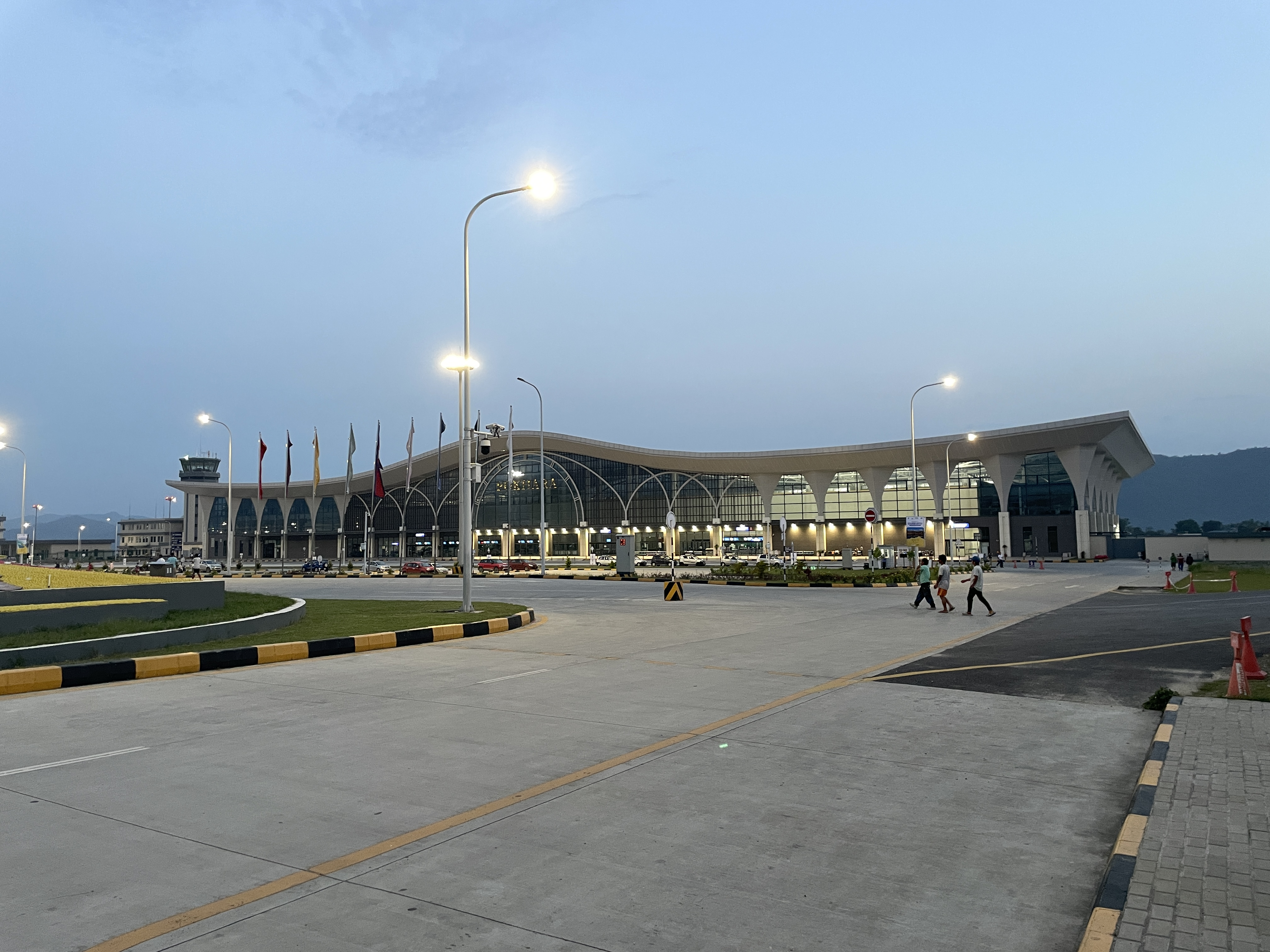
Terminal in the evening.

ILS system is said to be operational after 26 February 2023.

=== Terminals ===
There are two public terminals at the airport, one for international traffic and one for domestic traffic. The new airport infrastructure includes a 10,000-square-metre (110,000 sq ft) international terminal building with a steel roof as well as a 3,500-square-metre (38,000 sq ft) customs and cargo building. The international terminal can handle up to 610 departing passengers per hour. Two terminals, one domestic and one international, will be able to handle one million passengers annually. The 4,000-square-metre (43,000 sq ft) domestic terminal is located on the western side of the airport.

=== Aircraft maintenance ===
Buddha Air plans on constructing a hangar that can accommodate aircraft up to the size of an Airbus A319. The airport will also feature a 6,000-square-metre (65,000 sq ft) domestic and international hangar.

== Air routes ==
Nepal has asked India since at least 2014 for new air routes but has not received them. Even though air routes are governed by the Freedoms of the air commercial aviation rights, India and Nepal are both signatories to it but one of India's reasons is that it involves India's security. Nepal has also proposed various air routes which are yet to be implemented.

== Airlines and destinations ==
In 2018, Buddha Air first announced that it was planning to operate its planned international fleet of Boeing or Airbus aircraft out of the airport. In mid-2021, Biman Bangladesh Airlines was the first international carrier to plan to serve the airport upon opening. The first Nepali Airline, Buddha Air, revealed plans in late 2022 to make Varanasi, in the Indian state of Varanasi, Uttar Pradesh, the first destination from the airport.

Airlines	Destinations
Bhutan Airlines	Paro
Buddha Air	Bhadrapur, Bharatpur, Biratnagar, Janakpur, Jitpursimara, Kathmandu, Nepalgunj, Siddharthanagar
Flydubai	Dubai–International
Guna Airlines	Kathmandu
Himalaya Airlines	Lhasa
Saurya Airlines	Kathmandu
Shree Airlines	Kathmandu
Sichuan Airlines	Chengdu
Sita Air	Kathmandu
Yeti Airlines	Kathmandu

The helicopter operators Air Dynasty, Prabhu Helicopter and Simrik Air offer helicopter operations out of their respective hubs at Pokhara International Airport.

== Future destinations ==
Air Astra, a privately owned Bangladeshi passenger airline based at Hazrat Shahjalal International Airport, has planned to operate to Pokhara, Nepal four times a week from the coming winter schedule of 2024, followed by Indian routes. According to an employee of Society International Travel Services, the official General Sales Agent (GSA) of the airline, they are preparing to operate regular flights to Pokhara within the next six months.The company is studying the possibility of connecting flights from Pokhara to various destinations including Australia via Chengdu along with direct flights.

== Ground transport ==
The airport is linked by an access road with the Prithvi Highway. Buses also connect the airport with Pokhara's city centre.

== Incidents and accidents ==
- On 15 January 2023, Yeti Airlines Flight 691 crashed on approach to Pokhara International Airport. The aircraft, an ATR 72-500, was carrying 72 people on board with 68 passengers when it crashed on the bank of the Seti Gandaki River. The airport was closed as authorities launched a rescue operation, but there were no survivors. On approach, the pilots elected to approach the airport from the opposite direction but due to high workload failed to detect that the propellers were feathered instead of lowering the flaps. The plane lost power and speed and stalled hitting terrain.

== See also ==
- List of airports in Nepal
