= List of accidents and incidents involving the de Havilland DHC-6 Twin Otter =

List of aviation incidents

This is a list of accidents and incidents involving the Twin Otter

== 1960s ==
=== 1967 ===
- On March 11, 1967, an Aeralpi de Havilland Canada DHC-6 Twin Otter crashed into Col Visentin during landing in bad weather and foggy conditions, killing 4 of the 5 occupants.

=== 1968 ===
- On November 23, 1968, a Cable Commuter Airlines de Havilland Canada DHC-6 Twin Otter hit the light pole on approach to Santa Ana, killing all 9 occupants on board.

=== 1969 ===
- On July 15, 1969, a New York Airways Flight 901 caught in a wake of vortex and lose control, killing 3 of the 14 occupants.

== 1970s ==
=== 1970 ===
- On February 10, 1970, Pilgrim Airlines Flight 203 ditched near Waterford, Connecticut due to fuel exhaustion, killing all 5 on board (2 crew members and 3 passengers).
- On April 28, 1970, Trans Australia Airlines Flight 1369 crashed shortly after takeoff while trying to turn, killing the two pilots and 6 of the 9 passengers on board.
- On November 9, 1970, Mississippi Valley Airlines Flight 106 collided with the tree tops during descending to La Crosse. All 6 occupants survived.

=== 1972 ===
- On May 27, 1972, General Air Flight 005 banked to the left shortly after take-off due to asymmetric thrust, killing 8 of the 13 on board.
- On June 29, 1972, North Central Airlines Flight 290 collided in mid-air with Air Wisconsin Flight 671 over Lake Winnebago near Fox Crossing, Wisconsin, in the United States. Both aircraft crashed into the lake, killing all 13 people on board both aircraft.
- On July 11, 1972, a Royal Norwegian Air Force de Havilland Canada DHC-6 Twin Otter drifted off course and struck into Lille Tussen Mountain, killing all 17 occupants.
- On December 21, 1972, an Air Guadeloupe de Havilland Canada DHC-6 Twin Otter crashed at night near the island of St. Maarten, killing all 13 on board.

=== 1973 ===
- On February 5, 1973, Karair Flight 482 had its right engine broken and the plane was damaged while performing an emergency landing. All 18 on board survived.
- On June 10, 1973, a Royal Nepal Airlines de Havilland Canada DHC-6 Twin Otter was hijacked to gather funds for an armed revolution. All 22 survived and this incident is also known as Biratnagar Plane Hijack

=== 1974 ===
- On June 28, 1974, Rocky Mountain Airways Flight 323 collided with a Beechcraft Bonanza while on final approach. The DHC-6 crash-landed in a wheat field where all 12 occupants survived while the sole-occupant of the Bonanza also survived.

=== 1975 ===
- On January 9, 1975, Golden West Airlines Flight 261, a de Havilland Canada DHC-6 Twin Otter, collided with a Cessna 150 (N11421), owned by CessnAir Aviation, Inc., near Whittier, California. The accident occurred at approximately 4:07 p.m. PST, while the Sun was just 9 degrees above the western horizon, directly into the eyes of the pilots of GW flight 261.

=== 1976 ===
- On December 12, 1976, an Atlantic City Airlines De Havilland Canada DHC-6 Twin Otter operating as Allegheny Commuter Flight 977 crashed short of the runway. Of the two crew members, one died and one sustained serious injuries. Of the passengers, two died and six sustained serious injuries. One seriously injured passenger died one month after the accident, but was counted as a survivor by the National Transportation Safety Board report, because it defined fatalities as individuals who died within seven days of the accident.

=== 1977 ===
- On January 14, 1977, a de Havilland Canada DHC-6 Twin Otter operated by Northern Thunderbird Air, flying as Pacific Western Airlines Flight 405, crashed into a mountain during its approach to runway 32 in a snowstorm. The flight, operating from Prince George to Terrace, was carrying 12 individuals, all of whom died in the crash. Weather conditions, including limited visibility and heavy snowfall, were significant factors contributing to the accident.
- On March 29, 1977, Merpati Nusantara Airlines Flight 516 stalled during approach and crashed into a mountain, killing 13 of the 23 on board.

=== 1978 ===
- On September 2, 1978, an Airwest Airlines de Havilland Canada DHC-6 Twin Otter had its left flap failed, causing it to yaw to the left and plunged into the sea, killing 11 of the 13 on board.
- On September 9, 1978, a Lineas Aéreas del Centro de Havilland Canada DHC-6 Twin Otter crashed into a slope, killing 19 of the 21 occupants.
- On December 4, 1978, Rocky Mountain Airways Flight 217 crashed on Buffalo Pass after encountering severe icing conditions and downdrafts. 20 out of the 22 passengers and crew would survive the crash, which prompted media to call the "Miracle on Buffalo Pass".

=== 1979 ===
- On May 30, 1979, Downeast Flight 46 crashed on approach to the airport when the pilots descended below the minimum allowable altitude in difficult weather and failed to correct their error. 16 passengers and crew out of the 17 on board were killed, 1 passenger survived the crash.
- On June 17, 1979, Air New England Flight 248 while approaching Barnstable Municipal Airport in Hyannis, Massachusetts. One person, the pilot, was killed.
- On September 30, 1979, West Coast Air Flight 106 banked steeply to the right due to the separation of the right-hand aileron, killing 2 of the 16 on board.

== 1980s ==
=== 1981 ===
- On July 24, 1981, Air Madagascar Flight 112 struck into a mountain, killing all 19 on board.
- On July 31, 1981, a de Havilland Canada DHC-6 Twin Otter of the Panamanian Air Force crashed at Cerro Marta in Coclesito, near Penonomé, Panama.. The aircraft disappeared from radar during light weather, but due to the limited nature of Panama's radar coverage at the time, the plane was not reported missing for nearly a day. The crash site was located several days later, and the body of Torrijos was recovered by a Special Forces team in the first few days of August. Four aides and two pilots also died in the crash. His death caused national mourning around the country, especially in poor areas. Following a large state funeral, Torrijos's body was briefly buried in a cemetery in Casco Viejo (the Old City of Panama), before being moved to a mausoleum in the former Canal Zone on Fort Amador near Panama City. He was succeeded as commander of the National Guard and de facto leader of Panama by Florencio Flores (de jure was a military leader; however, de facto never exercised power as one,) who later gave way to Rubén Darío Paredes. The crash site is now a national park. The crash killed Omar Torrijos.
- On December 18, 1981, an ACES de Havilland Canada DHC-6 Twin Otter crashed into a hill near San Antero, killing all 13 occupants.

=== 1982 ===
- On February 21, 1982, Pilgrim Airlines Flight 458 suffered in-flight fire due to leakage of flammable windshield washer/deicing fluid and force-landed into a frozen river. Only 1 died of the 12 on board.
- On March 11, 1982, Wideroe Flight 933 crashed into the sea near Mehamn, killing all fifteen on board. More than twenty years and four rounds of investigation later, this incident remained highly controversial in Norway, but it is highly possible that the stabilizers were separated from the aircraft during clear-air turbulence, causing it to lose control.
- On November 29, 1982, ACES Flight 189 struck the slope of a mountain while cruising, killing all 22 on board.

=== 1983 ===
- On March 10, 1983, a Bakhtar Afghan Airlines de Havilland Canada DHC-6 Twin Otter lose control after the pilots were incapitated from lack of oxygen in adverse weather, killing all 19 on board.

=== 1984 ===
- On October 9, 1984, Nahanni Air Services Flight 97 struck a communications tower and rolled over to the right, killing all 7 on board.

=== 1985 ===
- On January 23, 1985, ACES Flight 052 struck the side of a mountain while flying under adverse weather conditions, killing all 23 on board.

=== 1986 ===
- On June 12, 1986, Loganair Flight 423 crashed into the ground during approach under foggy condition, killing 1 of the 16 occupants.
- On June 14, 1986, a Canadian Armed Forces de Havilland Canada DHC-6 Twin Otter crashed into the mountain due to an illusion deceiving the pilots into thinking that the obstacle is still far away, killing all 8 on board.
- On June 18, 1986, Grand Canyon Airlines Flight 6 collided Helitech Flight 2, a Bell 206, separating the tail and crashed. All 25 occupants on both aircraft died.
- On August 3, 1986, LIAT Flight 319 crashed into the Caribbean Sea, but no wreckage nor occupants were found. All 11 were missing.

=== 1987 ===
- On August 4, 1987, Trans World Express Flight 7591 collided with a Cessna 172 while approach to the airport. Both aircraft landed safely, and none of the 8 occupants of the DHC-6 and the 3 occupants of the Cessna 172 died.

=== 1988 ===
- On July 20, 1988, a Fairways Corp. de Havilland Canada DHC-6 Twin Otter stalled and crashed after takeoff. The sole occupant, the pilot, was killed.
- On November 30, 1988, an Aero Club Libya de Havilland Canada DHC-6 Twin Otter contacted an asphalted pipeline bridge, killing all 14 occupants.

=== 1989 ===
- On September 27, 1989, Grand Canyon Airlines Flight 5 rolled to the right and crashed onto a wooded hill during the go-around, killing 10 of the 21 on board.
- On October 28, 1989, Aloha IslandAir Flight 1712 crashed into mountainous terrain in bad weather, killing all 20 occupants.

== 1990s ==
=== 1990 ===
- On April 12, 1990, Widerøe Flight 839 had its stablizer cracked due to strong winds, causing the aircraft to lose control and plunged into the sea just shortly after take off. All 5 occupants died and the crash was also known as the Værøy Accident.
- On April 18, 1990, an Aeroperlas de Havilland DHC-6-300 Twin Otter suffered from bird strike, causing the right engine to fail. The plane rolled to the right and crashed, killing 20 of the 22 on board.

=== 1991 ===
- On September 27, 1991, a Solomon Airlines de Havilland DHC-6-300 Twin Otter struck the slope of a mountain while cruising, killing all 15 on board.

=== 1992 ===
- On April 22, 1992, a Perris Valley Aviation de Havilland DHC-6-300 Twin Otter crashed during takeoff due to the loss of power in the right engine, killing 19 of the 22 on board.

=== 1993 ===
- On October 27, 1993, Widerøe Flight 744 hit some tree and crashed into a hill during approach, killing 6 of the 19 on board. The accident is also known as the Namsos Accident.

=== 1994 ===
- On December 17, 1994, a Mission Aviation Fellowship de Havilland DHC-6-300 Twin Otter struck the slope of a mountain under cloudy conditions, killing all 28 on board.

=== 1995 ===
- On January 10, 1995, Merpati Nusantara Airlines Flight 6715 disappeared off the coast of Flores, believing to have crashed into the sea under bad weather condition. All 14 occupants were missing.

=== 1996 ===
- On November 30, 1996, ACES Flight 148 stalled shortly after take-off and struck the mountain, leaving only 1 survivor of the 15 on board.

=== 1997 ===
- On January 7, 1997, Polynesian Airlines Flight 211 crashed into a mountain during approach under bad weather, killing 3 of the 5 on board.

== 2000s ==
=== 2000 ===
- On July 27, 2000, a de Havilland Canada DHC-6 Twin Otter operated by Royal Nepal Airlines crashed into Jarayakhali Hill, killing all 25 on board.

=== 2001 ===
- On 24 March 2001, Air Caraïbes Flight 1501, a de Havilland DHC-6-300 Twin Otter arriving from Princess Juliana International Airport in Sint Maarten, suffered a loss of control on its approach to runway 10 and crashed into a house, killing all of its 19 occupants and an additional person on the ground.

=== 2002 ===
- On 22 August 2002, a Shangri-La Air Twin Otter aircraft, on a flight from Jomsom to Pokhara, crashed into a hill that was under complete cloud cover following three days of continuous rain. All three crew and 15 passengers were killed.

=== 2006 ===
- On May 23, 2006, an Air São Tomé & Principe de Havilland Canada DHC-6 Twin Otter rolled sharply to the left and crashed into the Baía Ana Chaves, killing all 4 occupants.
- On 21 June 2006, a Yeti Airlines De Havilland Canada DHC-6 Twin Otter Series 300 (9N-AEQ), on a flight from Surkhet approaching Jumla Airport, the pilot apparently decided to go around. The aircraft crashed into a mountainside on the eastern side of the airport, killing all three crew and six passengers.

=== 2007 ===
- On August 9, 2007, Air Moorea Flight 1121 crashed shortly after taking off from Temae Airport. The de Havilland Canada DHC-6 Twin Otter was bound for Tahiti's Faa'a International Airport. The report found that the crash was caused by the failure of the pitch control cables following the retraction of the flaps after take-off, which causes significant torque on that aircraft and thus additional pressure on the cables. The failure was caused by significant wear due to the lack of special maintenance and inspections for the stainless-steel cables (which are more subject to wear than their carbon steel counterparts), and exacerbated by the jet-blast of an A340 while the aircraft was parked. Another contributory cause for the crash were found to be the lack of pilot training for loss of pitch control. All 19 passengers and the sole crew member died. Amongst those 19 passengers were two European Union officials.

=== 2008 ===
- On 8 October 2008, Yeti Airlines Flight 101, a DHC-6 Twin Otter 300 (registration 9N-AFE) crashed on final approach and caught fire, killing eighteen passengers and crew. The aircraft's captain was the only survivor. Video of the incident showed inclement weather at the time of the incident.

=== 2009 ===
- On 2 August 2009, Merpati Nusantara Airlines Flight 9760D struck the side of a mountain on approach to Oksibil, killing all 15 on board.
- On 11 August 2009, Airlines PNG Flight 4684, a de Havilland Canada DHC-6 Twin Otter carrying 11 passengers and 2 crew, flying from Port Moresby, crashed into a mountain at Isurava, Papua New Guinea whilst attempting a go around. All passengers and crew perished in the accident.

== 2010s ==
=== 2010 ===
- On 15 December 2010, a DHC-6 Twin Otter crashed shortly after takeoff from Lamidanda Airport in Nepal; it was en route to Kathmandu. All 19 passengers and 3 flight crew were killed.

=== 2013 ===
- On 23 January 2013, a Kenn Borek Air DHC-6 Twin Otter skiplane, with three Canadians on board, crashed onto Mount Elizabeth. The Emergency Locator Transmitter (ELT) was detected on the same day. The plane had been en route from the South Pole's Amundsen–Scott US station to Terra Nova Bay's Zucchelli Italian station, operating under the auspices of the Italian National Agency for New Technologies, Energy and Sustainable Economic Development (ENEA).
- On May 16, 2013, Nepal Airlines Flight 555 overran the runway and crashed near a river after failing to go-around, injuring 7 of the 21 on board, but all survived.
- On October 10, 2013, MASwings Flight 3002 landed short of the runway at Kudat Airport. The aircraft impacted a house and was destroyed. This accident marks the only fatal incident for MASwings, where two people were confirmed dead, including the co-pilot.

=== 2014 ===
- On 16 February 2014, Nepal Airlines Flight 183 crashed shortly after taking off for a flight from Pokhara to Jumla Airport. The crash in bad weather killed all the 18 on board.

=== 2015 ===
- On 2 October 2015, Aviastar Flight 7503 with three crew members and seven passengers on board, crashed near Palopo 11 minutes after takeoff. The passengers were 4 adults, 2 children, and 1 baby. There were no survivors.

=== 2016 ===
- On 24 February 2016, Tara Air Flight 193 went missing shortly after take off whilst traveling to Pokhara-Jomsom. It was later found that the aircraft crashed into the mountainous northern region killing 23 people including 2 babies and 3 crew members.

== 2020s ==
=== 2022 ===
- On May 11, 2022, a Caverton Helicopters Viking Air DHC-6 Twin Otter 400 crashed into a forest during cruising with controversies, killing all 11 on board.
- On May 29, 2022, Tara Air Flight 197 lost contact with ATC 12 minutes after takeoff from Pokhara Airport. The wreckage was found 20 hours later on the side of a mountain in Sanosware, Mustang District; none of the 22 on board survived.

=== 2024 ===
- On October 20, 2024, a SAM Air DHC-6 Twin Otter aircraft with registration PK-SMH crashed while attempting to land at Panua Airport in Pohuwato Regency, Gorontalo.

=== 2025 ===
- On April 25, 2025, a Royal Thai Police Aviation de Havilland Canada DHC-6 Twin Otter crashed after takeoff after a test flight. All six aboard were killed: three crew and three passengers. The cause was ascribed to the failure of both engines.
