= Shangri-La Air =

IATA	ICAO	Call sign
-	-	-
- Commenced operations: 1999
- Ceased operations: 2008
- AOC #: 029/99
- Operating bases: Tribhuvan International Airport
- Fleet size: 1 (at closure)
- Headquarters: Kathmandu, Nepal
- Employees: 250 (2001)

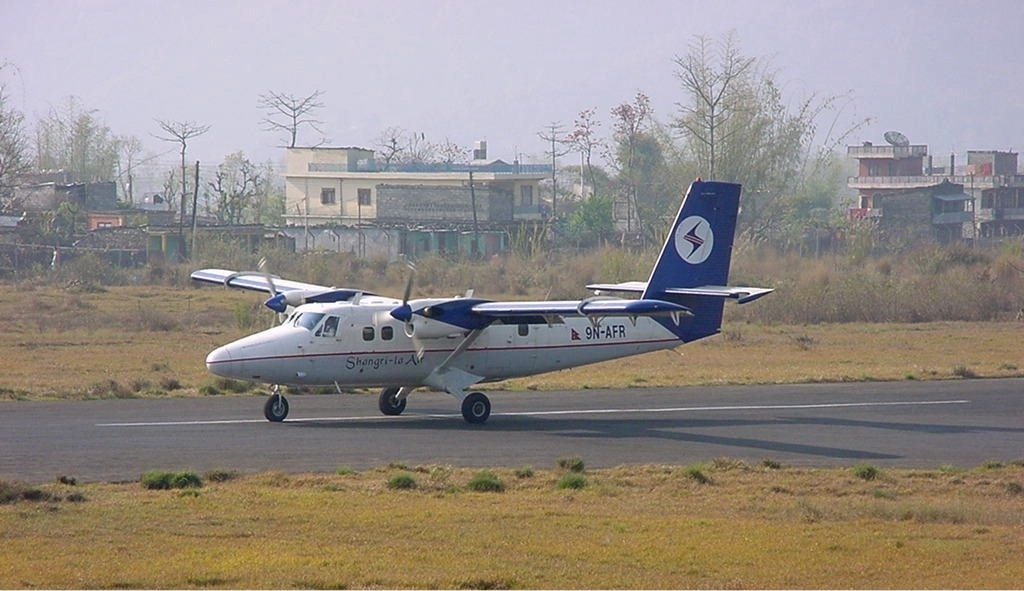
Shangri-La Air's Twin Otter at Pokhara Airport in 2000

Shangri-La Air was an airline based in Nepal. It partly merged with Necon Air in 2001 and eventually ceased operations in 2008.

== History ==
The airline started operations in October 1999 with one De Havilland Canada DHC-6 Twin Otter aircraft. Its name is derived from Shangri-La, a fictitious place described in James Hilton's 1933 novel Lost Horizon..

In 2001 Shangri-La Air and Karnali Air were partly merged into Necon Air. Shangri-La Air was operating a fleet of six aircraft, two Beechcraft 1900Ds and four De Havilland Canada DHC-6 Twin Otters. Necon Air took over the Beechcraft, and Shangri-La continued operating the DHC-6s.

In August 2002, after the loss of one DHC-6, the airline operated only two aircraft. In 2007 its fleet consisted of only one DHC-6, until its closure in 2008.

== Destinations ==
Shangri-La Air regularly served the following destinations, some of which were discontinued before its closure:

City	Airport	Notes	Refs
Bhairahawa	Gautam Buddha Airport		
Bharatpur	Bharatpur Airport		
Jomsom	Jomsom Airport		
Kathmandu	Tribhuvan International Airport	Hub	
Lukla	Tenzing–Hillary Airport		
Phaplu	Phaplu Airport		
Pokhara	Pokhara Airport		
Rumjatar	Rumjatar Airport		
Pipara Simara	Simara Airport		

It also ran scheduled mountain sightseeing flights from Kathmandu to the Mount Everest range. They usually departed in the early morning hours and returned one hour later.

== Fleet ==
At the time of closure, Shangri-La Air operated the following aircraft:

Shangri-La Air Fleet at closure in 2008
Aircraft	In fleet	Notes
De Havilland Canada DHC-6 Twin Otter	1	

=== Former fleet ===
Shangri-La Air former Fleet
Aircraft	In fleet	Notes
Beechcraft 1900D	2	
De Havilland Canada DHC-6 Twin Otter	3	

== Incidents and accidents ==
- 22 August 2002 - 2002 Shangri-La Air Twin Otter Crash
