= Agni Air Flight CHT =

Passenger plane crash in Jomsom, Nepal

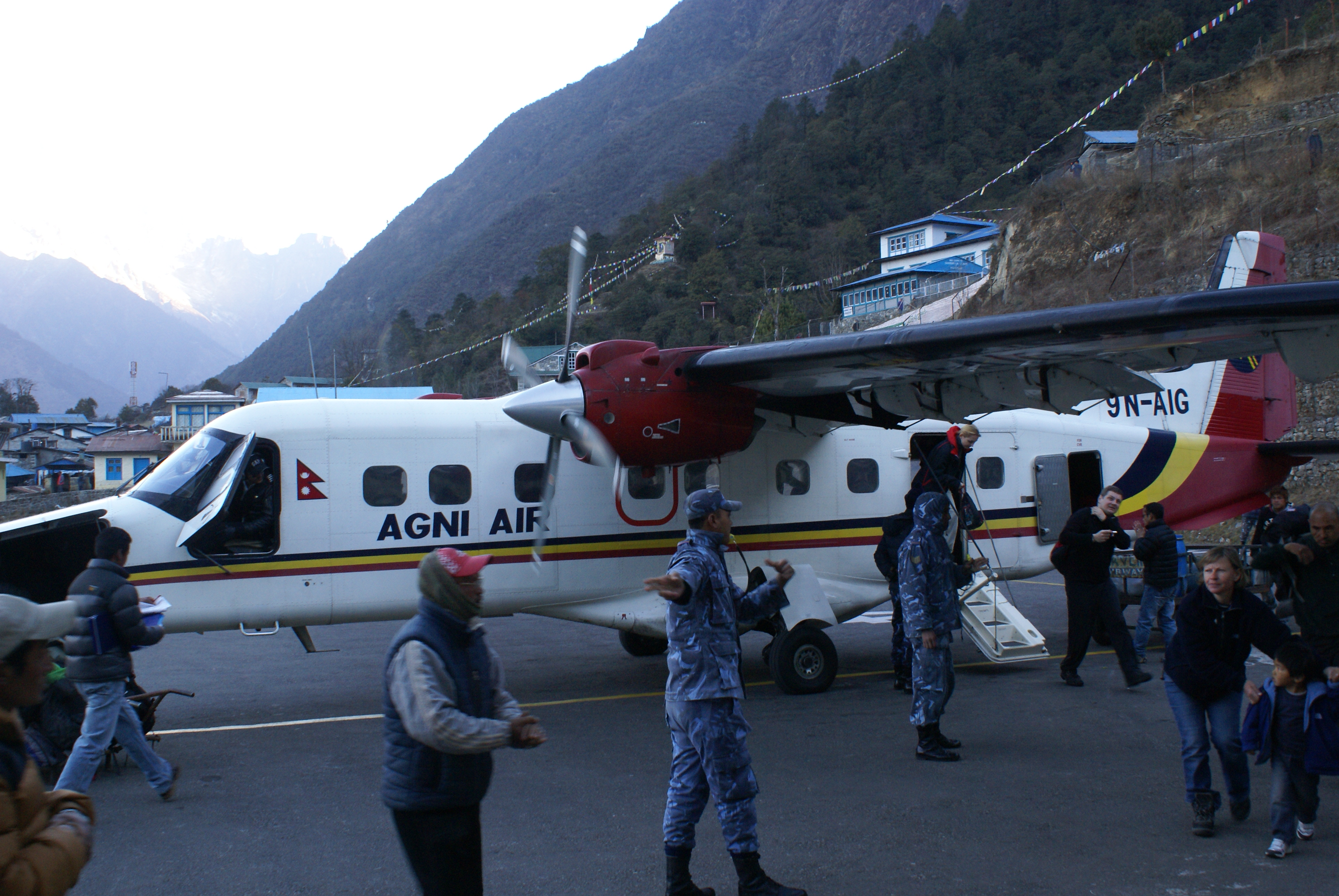
- 9N-AIG, the Dornier involved, seen two months earlier at Lukla Airport

Accident
- Date: 14 May 2012
- Summary: Crashed after go-around, aircraft's wings impacted a hill (CFIT)
- Site: Near Jomsom Airport, Nepal; 28°46′52″N 83°43′18″E

Aircraft
- Aircraft type: Dornier 228-212
- Operator: Agni Air
- IATA flight No.: AG-CHT
- Registration: 9N-AIG
- Flight origin: Pokhara Airport, Pokhara, Nepal
- Destination: Jomsom Airport, Jomsom, Nepal
- Occupants: 21
- Passengers: 18
- Crew: 3
- Fatalities: 15
- Injuries: 6
- Survivors: 6

On 14 May 2012, a Dornier 228 passenger aircraft of Agni Air operating Flight CHT, crashed near Jomsom Airport, Nepal, killing 15 of the 21 people on board, including both pilots and Indian child actress Taruni Sachdev and her mother.

== Accident ==
The aircraft was flying from Pokhara Airport to Jomsom Airport on an unscheduled flight CHT. There were eighteen passengers, two pilots and a flight attendant on board. At 09:30 local time (03:45 UTC), Flight CHT attempted to land at Jomson, but the first attempt was aborted by the pilots. During the subsequent go-around, one of the aircraft's wings impacted a hill, causing the aircraft to crash, killing 15 out of the 21 people on board.

== Aircraft ==
The aircraft involved was a Dornier 228-212 registered as 9N-AIG. It was built by Dornier Flugzeugwerke in 1997 and was operated by Hornbill Skyways before being purchased by Agni Air in 2008.

== Passengers and crew ==
The victims were two Nepali crew members and 13 passengers, including Indian child actress Taruni Sachdev and her mother. Six other passengers survived with injuries.

| Nationality | Fatalities | | Survivors | | Total |
| Nationality | Passengers | Crew | Passengers | Crew | Total |
|---|---|---|---|---|---|
| Nepal | 0 | 2 | 0 | 1 | 3 |
| India | 13 | – | 3 | – | 16 |
| Denmark | 0 | – | 2 | – | 2 |

== See also ==
- Agni Air Flight 101
