= Tara Air Flight 197 =

Passenger plane crash in Nepal

Accident
- Date: 29 May 2022
- Summary: Controlled flight into terrain due to loss of situational awareness
- Site: Thasang-2, Mustang District, Nepal; 28°42′42.8394″N 83°35′31.92″E

Aircraft
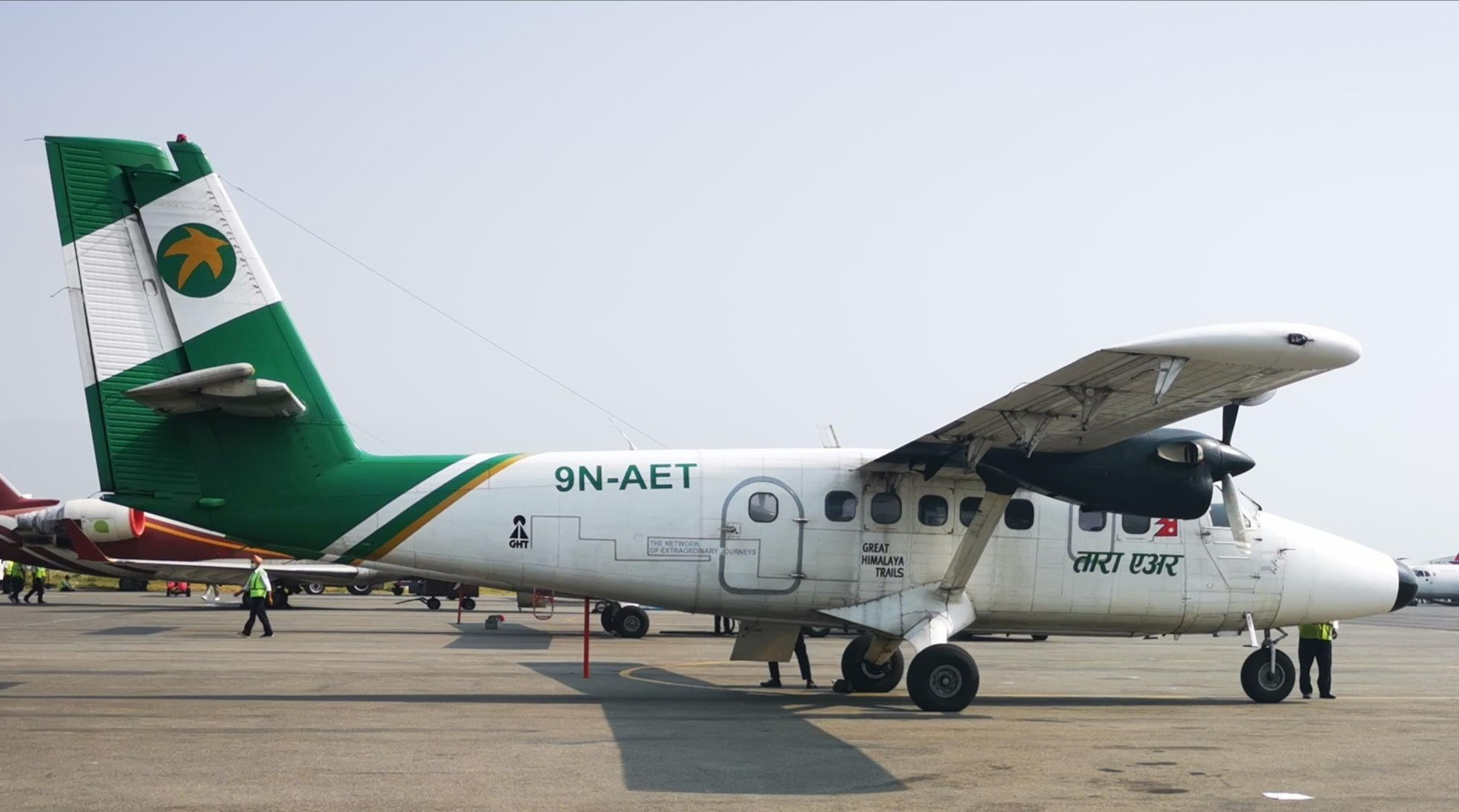
- 9N-AET, the aircraft involved in the accident, two months before the crash
- Aircraft type: de Havilland Canada DHC-6-300 Twin Otter
- Operator: Tara Air operated for Yeti Airlines
- IATA flight No.: TB197
- ICAO flight No.: TRA197
- Call sign: TARA AIR 197
- Registration: 9N-AET
- Flight origin: Pokhara Airport, Nepal
- Destination: Jomsom Airport, Nepal
- Occupants: 22
- Passengers: 19
- Crew: 3
- Fatalities: 22
- Survivors: 0

Tara Air Flight 197 was a scheduled domestic flight operated by Tara Air for parent company Yeti Airlines from Pokhara Airport to Jomsom Airport in Nepal. On 29 May 2022, the De Havilland Canada DHC-6 Twin Otter aircraft carrying 22 people (19 passengers and 3 crew members) departed at 09:55 NPT (04:10 UTC) and lost contact with air traffic controllers about 12 minutes later at 10:07 (04:22). The wreckage was located 20 hours later on a mountainside. All 22 passengers and crew were killed, and all 22 bodies were recovered. This was Tara Air's second deadly accident on this route, after Flight 193 in 2016.

== Accident ==
On 29 May 2022, Tara Air's 9N-AET was scheduled for three flights on the Pokhara-Jomsom-Pokhara sector. Tara Air had also filed flight plans for two additional charter flights on the same sector. The weather at Jomsom airport in the early morning was cloudy with light rain due to which no flights were conducted since morning and most of the passengers of Tara Air and Summit Air were already at the airport. With the opening of Jomsom airport for operation at 9:06 am, Tara Air decided to operate the first scheduled flight. The flight was supposed to take off before another flight SMT 601 but the pilot in command was hesitant due to weather unfavorable for visual flights and critical weather around Lete and Tatopani which was reported by a pilot from another flight Summit Air's 9N-AKZ that took before it. In the cockpit voice recorder, it was observed that someone, either ground staff or some intimate passenger to the crew, advised strongly to the pilot to conduct the flight. Following the report from the pilot of 9N-AKZ, both flights started their engines. The pilot of Tara flight was still hesitant even after the engine start and delayed the taxi as he was not convinced about the weather report received from the preceding flight. In the meantime, SMT 601 lined up for departure to Jomson, and Tara Flight 197 finally lined up.

The aircraft took off from Pokhara at 9:55 am local time and was scheduled to land at Jomsom Airport at 10:15 am. The en-route weather provided by the previous flight 9N-AKZ was not the same. After the flight crossed Ghodepani, the pilot was not comfortable with the cloudy en-route weather and voiced his dissatisfaction about the behavior of other pilots who conducted visual flights in such unfavorable weather. During the continuous attempts of the crew to avoid the clouds with TAWS (Terrain Awareness Warning System) inhibited, it crashed into the rocky terrain at an altitude of 4050 m above sea level at Sanusare Mountain, Thasang Rural Municipality of Mustang district. Its last position was 14.26 km southwest of Jomson Airport. According to the Civil Aviation Authority of Nepal (CAAN), it lost contact with air traffic controllers at 10:07 am, above Ghorepani, Myagdi District.

== Aircraft ==
According to Flightradar24, the plane was a de Havilland Canada DHC-6 Twin Otter registered under the number 9N-AET. It made its maiden flight on April 21, 1979. It was first purchased by Air Botswana in 1979 and was later sold to Lesotho Airways in December 1983. The plane encountered an accident after striking a tree on approach in 1984. It was then purchased by RRCS Air Services before being purchased by Jetstream Aircraft Sales in 1997 and it entered Nepal in 1998 under Lumbini Airways but was procured by Yeti Airlines in 1999. The plane had been operated by Tara Air since April 2010. The aircraft had basic engine instrumentation and navigation equipment. Later, it received updated avionics equipment like GPS, TAWS (Terrain Awareness Warning System), TCAS (Traffic Collision Avoidance System), Cockpit Voice Recorder, AHRS (Altitude and Heading Reference System), and weather radar.

== Victims ==
The flight was carrying 22 occupants, and the 19 passengers consisted of 13 Nepalese, four Indians and two Germans. There were two pilots and a flight attendant among the 13 Nepalis on the flight. NDTV stated that the four Indian passengers were members of the same family from Mumbai.

Nationality	Passengers	Crew	Total
Nepal	13	3	16
India	4	0	4
Germany	2	0	2
Total	19	3	22

== Emergency response ==
Search efforts were initially hampered by poor weather conditions. The CAAN said that a search helicopter from Jomsom had to make a return trip due to the weather. Search efforts were also conducted by Kailash Air, but failed to locate the aircraft. The phone location of the captain was tracked by search and rescue personnel with the assistance of Nepal Telecom. A spokesperson from Yeti Airlines said that the tracking data indicated the phone's last location was around the vicinity of Lete, a village in the Mustang District. The CAAN said that an emergency locator transmitter narrowed the possible last known location to around the Khaibang area.

Locals from Lete informed police of an "unusual sound" near the village. A police officer said that the police would send a helicopter to the area. Air traffic controllers at Jomsom Airport also reported hearing a loud noise at around the time of the disappearance.

Five hours after it was reported missing, the wreckage of the plane was found near Kowang, a village in the Mustang District. Residents reported seeing the burning aircraft at the foot of Mount Manapathi, near the mouth of a river. An official of the Nepali Army said that personnel were traveling to the crash site. Search and rescue efforts were called off later that day due to snowfall at the suspected crash site. A Nepali Army brigadier general tweeted that the "loss of daylight and adverse weather" led to search and rescue being called off. Search and rescue was expected to resume the following morning.

On 30 May, about 20 hours after it was reported missing, the wreckage of the aircraft was located by local farmers in Sanosware, Thasang Rural Municipality in the Mustang District. It was discovered at an altitude of 14,500 ft (4,400 m). No survivors among the flight's 22 occupants were found. According to Tara Air, 14 bodies were recovered from within a 100-metre (330 ft) radius of the crash site. The flight recorder ("black box") was recovered. A photograph of the crash site showed intact portions of the tail and a wing.

The Indian embassy in Nepal tweeted about the disappearance shortly after it was reported: "Tara Air flight 9NAET that took off from Pokhara at 9:55 am today with 22 people onboard, including 4 Indians, has gone missing." Search and rescue operations were at that moment ongoing. The embassy was in contact with their families.

== Investigation ==
According to the final report released by the Aircraft Accident Investigation Commission on 13 May 2023, the probable cause of the accident was flight crew's failure to monitor and maintain the proper flight path while inadvertently flying in Instrument Meteorological Condition (IMC) conditions with the aircraft's Terrain Avoidance and Warning System (TAWS) inhibited which resulted into a Controlled Flight Into Terrain (CFIT) accident.

=== Avionics factor ===
The recorded data showed the 'TAWS INHIBIT' feature had been selected by the flight crew for entire recorded flight due to which predictive Forward Looking Terrain Alert (FLTA), Imminent Terrain Impact (ITI), and Premature Descent Alert (PDA) were disabled. Only Ground Proximity Warning System (GPWS) Alerts were active which was annunciated approximately 3 seconds just before the impact. The TAWS was not receiving GPS Altitude as primary source for the altitude though it was configured to so. If the TAWS was not inhibited with the proper configuration, there would have been various TAWS Alerts at three occasions during the flight and the flight crew definitely would have sufficient time for comprehending the existing situation after the first TAWS Alerts and taking the required corrective maneuver in order to avoid accident. The aircraft was equipped with latest avionics equipment and it could fly in IMC conditions. The CAAN has mandated to install such advanced equipment and also the crews are also trained on the operations of the equipment but the CAAN does not allow to fly in IMC for normal visual flight legally, not even in critical phases of flight.

=== Human factor ===
The pilot in command was 62 years old and the copilot was relatively junior and with very little experience. This was the second flight of the copilot in that sector due to which it added additional pressure to pilot in command during the flight. They were flying in high altitude and difficult route in adverse weather conditions. The crew pairing was not satisfactory based on the nature of the flight and there was high cockpit crew gradient. The senior pilot had taken almost all in flight related duties including flying, monitoring and communications. Also, the copilot was not assigned any operational role and according to Cockpit Voice Recorder, the Pilot in Command did not respond to the copilot's input regarding the deviation from the track and pilot in command was too late to regain the track while he noticed the fact. There was lack of crew resource management and workload management of the crew. The copilot failed to effectively monitor and challenge the senior pilot's decision which was causal to the accident. The pilot in command was overloaded by all the cockpit duties while dealing with the unexpected weather which significantly degraded his performance and contributed to his failure to make proper decision while tackling the abnormal situation. Also, pilot in command mistakenly believed that the light he had seen from cockpit was a safe visual area to proceed toward there.

== See also ==
- List of airplane accidents in Nepal
