= Necon Air =

Nepalese airline based in Kathmandu

IATA	ICAO	Call sign
3Z	NEC	NECON AIR
- Founded: 14 September 1992
- Commenced operations: 1992
- Ceased operations: 2003
- Hubs: Tribhuvan International Airport
- Fleet size: 2 (at the time of closure)
- Destinations: 10 (at the time of closure)
- Headquarters: Nepal

Necon Air was a Nepalese airline based in Kathmandu. The airline was Nepal's first private airline company and was established on 14 September 1992 with one Hawker Siddeley HS 748 aircraft. The airline indefinitely suspended flights in 2003 due to financial difficulties and was delisted from the Nepal Stock Exchange in 2006.

== History ==
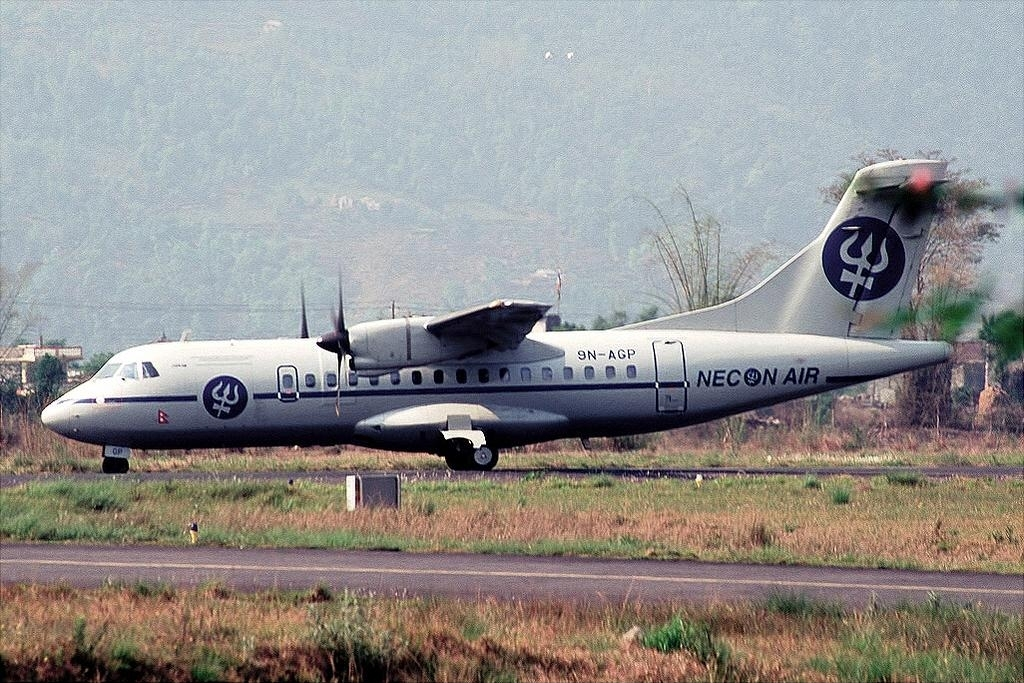
Necon Air ATR 42-320

Necon Air was established as Nepal's first private airline company in 1992.

In 2001, the airline partly merged with two other local airlines, Shangri-La Air and Karnali Air. As a part of this, Necon Air took over Shangri-La Air's fleet of two Beechcraft 1900Ds. Plans were announced to add two medium size Boeing or Airbus aircraft by September 2002 and extending the network to new regional destinations in South Asia and China. The Executive Chairman of Karnali Air, Narayan Singh Pun took on the position of Executive Chairman and Managing Director of Necon Air.

Necon Air indefinitely suspended flights in 2003 due to financial difficulties. Along with debt to private commercial banks, the airline also owed NPRs 20 million to the Civil Aviation Authority of Nepal for landing and ground charges and NPRs. 20 million to the Nepal Oil Corporation for fuel. The airline was also in dispute with Raytheon over leasing and financial arrangements for their Beechcraft 1900 aircraft and Raytheon were seeking the grounding of the aircraft.

== Destinations ==
Necon Air regularly served the following destinations, which were cancelled either at the closure of operations or before:

Country	City	IATA	ICAO	Airport	Notes	Refs
India	Patna	PAT	VEPT	Jay Prakash Narayan Airport		
India	Varanasi	VNS	VEBN	Lal Bahadur Shastri Airport		
Nepal	Bhairahawa	BWA	VNBW	Bhairahawa Airport		
Nepal	Bhadrapur	BDP	VNCG	Bhadrapur Airport		
Nepal	Biratnagar	BIR	VNVT	Biratnagar Airport		
Nepal	Janakpur	JKR	VNJP	Janakpur Airport		
Nepal	Kathmandu	KTM	VNKT	Tribhuvan International Airport	Hub	
Nepal	Nepalgunj	KEP	VNNG	Nepalgunj Airport		
Nepal	Pokhara	PKR	VNPK	Pokhara Airport		
Nepal	Simara	SIF	VNSI	Simara Airport		

== Fleet ==
Necon Air operated the following aircraft throughout its history:

Necon Air Fleet
Aircraft	In fleet	Notes
ATR 42	2	Registered 9N-AFU and 9N-AGP.
Hawker Siddeley HS 748	6	Registered 9N-ACH, 9N-ACM, 9N-ACP, 9N-ADE, 9N-AEG, 9N-AEH
Beechcraft 1900	2	Registered 9N-AGI, 9N-AGL
Cessna 208	2	Registered 9N-ADA, 9N-AEF

== Accidents and incidents ==
- On 6 November 1997, a Necon Air Avro 748-100 had a hydraulic failure after landing in Pokhara Airport on a flight from Kathmandu Airport. The pilot attempted to steer the plane, but it hit another stationary Hawker Siddeley HS 748. There were no fatalities among the four crew member and 44 passengers.
- On 18 January 1999, a Necon Air Cessna 208 Caravan I crashed upon departure in Jumla Airport killing four out of the 12 passengers and crew.
- 5 September 1999 - Necon Air Flight 128 from Pokhara Airport to Kathmandu Airport crashed when it hit a telecommunications tower. All 10 passengers and 5 crew were killed.
