= Shinta Mani Mustang =

Luxury resort in Mustang, Nepal

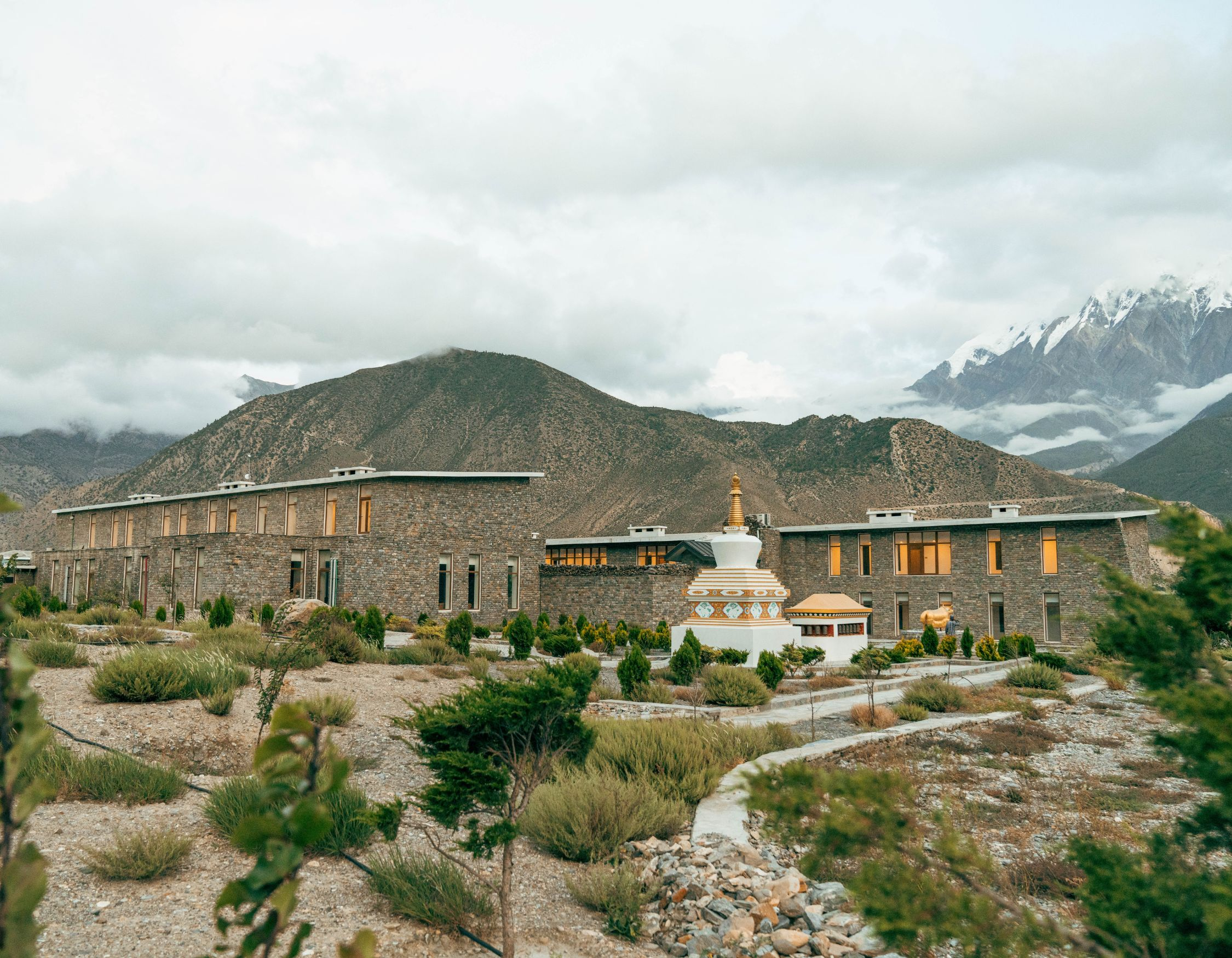

General information
- Location: Mustang, Gandaki, Nepal
- Coordinates: 28°46′51.34″N 83°43′01.28″E
- Opened: August 2023
- Owner: Sherpa Hospitality Group

Design and construction
- Architects: Bill Bensley, Prabal Thapa

Other information
- Number of suites: 29
- Number of restaurants: 1
- Number of bars: 1

Website
- Official website

Shinta Mani Mustang is a luxury resort located in Jomsom, Mustang district, Nepal. Opened in August 2023, the resort is part of the Shinta Mani Hotels collection and was developed by Sherpa Hospitality Group. The property features 29 suites and was designed through a collaboration between architect Prabal Thapa and interior designer Bill Bensley, incorporating elements inspired by the architecture, landscapes, and cultural heritage of the Mustang region.

Within a year of its opening, the resort received recognition from publications including National Geographic's Best New Hotels list for 2024.
