= 2002 Shangri-La Air DHC-6 crash =

Airplane crash in Nepal

Coordinates: 28°12′30″N 83°59′20″E

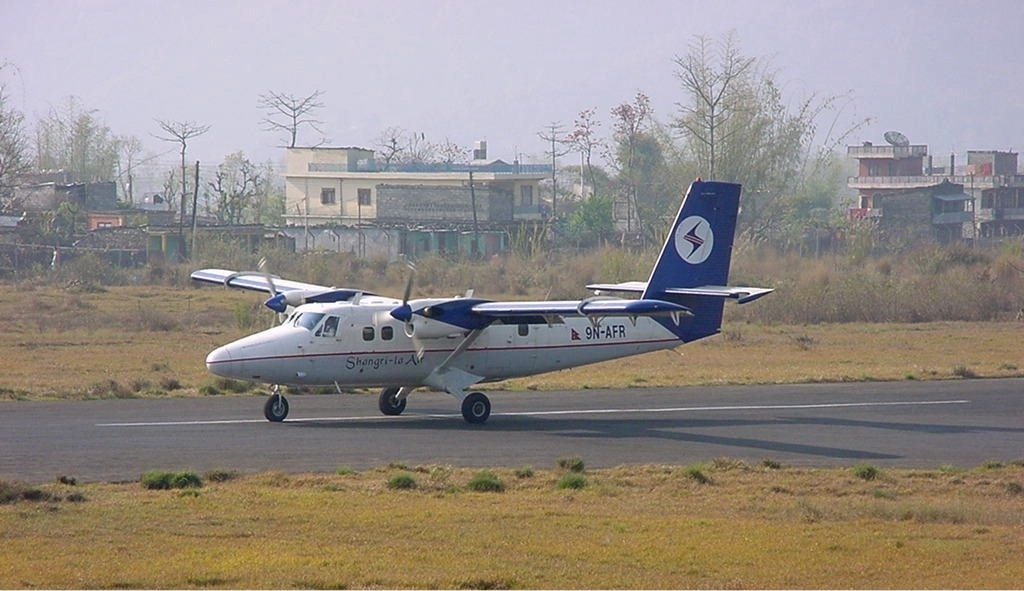
- 9N-AFR, the aircraft involved, pictured in 2000

Accident
- Date: 22 August 2002
- Summary: Controlled flight into terrain
- Site: 5 km south-east of Pokhara Airport, Pokhara, Nepal

Aircraft
- Aircraft type: de Havilland Canada DHC-6 Twin Otter
- Operator: Shangri-La Air
- Registration: 9N-AFR
- Flight origin: Jomsom Airport, Jomsom
- Destination: Pokhara Airport, Pokhara
- Occupants: 18
- Passengers: 15
- Crew: 3
- Fatalities: 18
- Survivors: 0

On 22 August 2002, a Shangri-La Air DHC-6 Twin Otter crashed against a hill 5 kilometers south-east of Pokhara, which was completely clouded following three days of continuous rains.

== Aircraft ==
The aircraft involved in the crash was a de Havilland Canada DHC-6 Twin Otter operated by Shangri-La Air. Its maiden flight was in 1981.

== Crew and Passengers ==
All occupants on board died in the crash; they included thirteen German citizens, one Briton and one American as well as three Nepalese crew members.

Nationality	Fatalities		Total
Nationality	Passengers	Crew	Total
Nepal	0	3	3
Germany	13	0	13
United States	1	0	1
United Kingdom	1	0	1
Total	15	3	18

== Accident ==
The flight operated as a tourist charter flight and was coming from Jomsom. On approach to Pokhara, it crashed into a hill that was hidden in the clouds.

The route out of Jomsom is considered as challenging for pilots, as they have to manoeuvre the aircraft through a deep gorge between Mount Annapurna and Mount Dhaulagiri.

By late afternoon on August 23, the wreckage was found near the village of Dopahar. The bodies were recovered and were flown to Kathmandu in army helicopters.

== Aftermath ==
As there were 13 German victims, Germany was particularly involved in the aftermath of the accident. Germany's Foreign Minister Joschka Fischer offered his condolences to the families. The German Federal Bureau of Aircraft Accident Investigation (BFU) sent a team to Nepal to investigate the crash, however, the plane was not fitted with a flight data recorder as this was not required under Nepal laws.
