= Nepal Airlines Flight 555 =

2013 aviation accident in Nepal

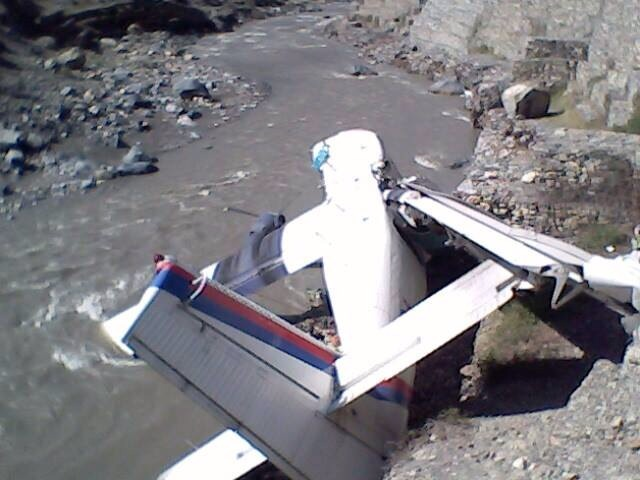
- Wreckage of the aircraft next to the Gandaki River

Accident
- Date: 16 May 2013
- Summary: Runway overrun on landing due to pilot error
- Site: Jomsom Airport, Jomsom, Manang, Nepal; 28°46′58.44″N 83°43′37.24″E

Aircraft
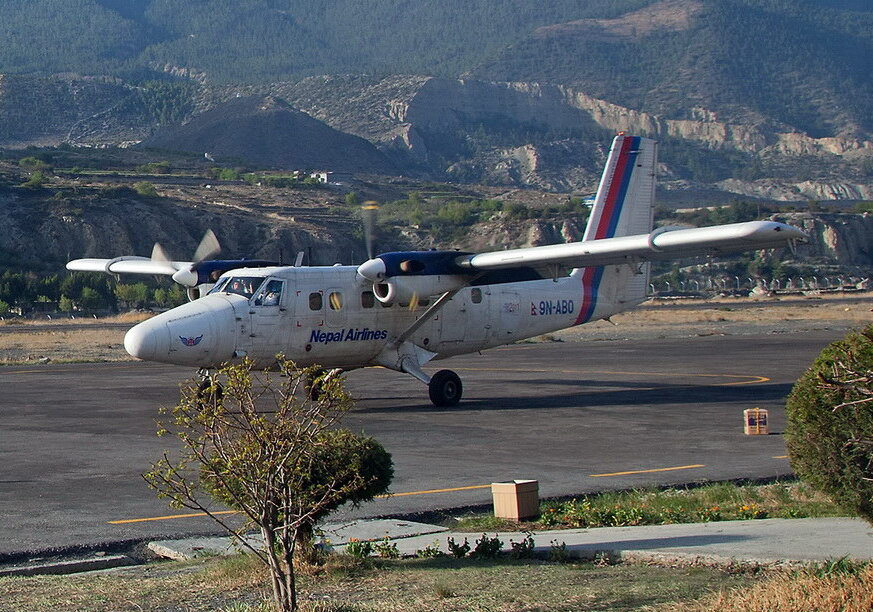
- 9N-ABO, the aircraft involved in the accident, pictured in 2011
- Aircraft type: de Havilland Canada DHC-6 Twin Otter
- Operator: Nepal Airlines
- IATA flight No.: RA555
- ICAO flight No.: RNA555
- Call sign: ROYAL NEPAL 555
- Registration: 9N-ABO
- Flight origin: Pokhara Airport, Nepal
- Destination: Jomsom Airport, Nepal
- Occupants: 21
- Passengers: 18
- Crew: 3
- Fatalities: 0
- Injuries: 7
- Survivors: 21

Nepal Airlines Flight 555 was a short domestic scheduled flight from Pokhara Airport to Jomsom Airport in Nepal of about 20 minutes' flying time, operated by Nepal Airlines. On 16 May 2013, the de Havilland Canada DHC-6 Twin Otter aircraft operating the flight crashed while landing at Jomsom Airport. Seven of the twenty-one on board were seriously injured. There were no fatalities, but the aircraft was damaged beyond economic repair.

== Aircraft and crew ==
The aircraft involved was a de Havilland Canada DHC-6 Twin Otter bearing the registration 9N-ABO. It was built in 1979 and had been operated by Nepal Airlines ever since. Following this incident, the aircraft was written off.

The captain was Pradhan Dipendra, 39 years old, with 8,451 total hours, 8,131 of those on the DHC-6. The first officer was K.C. Suresh 29 years old, with 1,396 total hours, 1,202 of those on the DHC-6. Both pilots are Nepali citizens.

== Passengers ==
Nationality	Passengers	Crew	Injured
Nepal	10	3	5
Japan	8	0	8
Total	18	3	13

There were eight Japanese tourists on the flight. All sustained injuries, with four of them in a critical condition, according to a police officer.

== Accident ==
According to police, just after the aircraft touched down on the runway it veered towards the right and fell 20 metres (66 ft) down the bank of the Gandaki River. The forward fuselage was destroyed, but the rear of the aircraft remained intact. The left wing was found submerged in the river.

== Investigation ==
On 18 February 2014, the Civil Aviation Authority of Nepal (CAAN) released their final report concluding the probable causes of the accident were:

"The inappropriate conduct of STOL procedure and landing technique carried out by the PIC, during landing phase and an endeavor to carry out take off again with no sufficient airspeed, no required lifting force and non-availability of required runway length to roll. A contributory factor was the absence of proper CRM in terms of communication, coordination and briefing in between crew members on intention and action being taken by PIC, during pre and post landing phase."

== Aftermath ==
The accident left Nepal Airlines with only two operational aircraft for its domestic flights. The airline said that it planned an engine exchange that would put three more Twin Otters, currently grounded, back in the air, but that process would take at least five months. In the meantime, the airline was expected to suffer a significant loss of market share.

Contrary to common practices in aviation, Nepal Airlines did not retire the flight number 555 and still operates the flight from Pokhara to Jomsom under this number.
