= Taruni Sachdev =

Indian child actress (1998–2012)

- Born: 14 May 1998; Mumbai, India
- Died: 14 May 2012 (aged 14); Jomsom, Nepal
- Occupations: Model; actress
- Years active: 2004–2012

Taruni Sachdev (14 May 1998 – 14 May 2012) was an Indian child actress. She made her film debut in 2004 with Vellinakshatram, which endeared her to Malayalam audiences. The same year, she also appeared in Sathyam. In 2009, she appeared in Paa. She also appeared in over 50 advertisements for various companies. Her last film was the Tamil film Vetri Selvan (2014), which was released two years after her death. She died in the 2012 Agni Air Dornier 228 crash near Jomsom Airport in Nepal. Her mother also died in the crash.

== Early life and education ==
Taruni Sachdev was born on 14 May 1998 in Mumbai, India, to industrialist Haresh Sachdev and Geeta Sachdev. She studied in class nine at Bai Avabai Framji Petit Girls' High School.

== Career ==
In 2004, she made her debut in Vinayan's comedy-horror Vellinakshatram. Vinayan said Vellinakshatram endeared Sachdev to Malayalam audiences. The same year, she appeared in the action thriller Sathyam. He recalls: "We were all amazed by the manner in which she performed. She was just five then and could render Malayalam dialogues after listening to it for a couple of times. I still remember the intensity with which she performed in the climax of the film, where even senior actors found it difficult to work against high-speed propellers".

In 2009, Sachdev appeared in R. Balki's comedy-drama Paa, where she starred as Somi, Amitabh Bachchan's classmate. India Today said she "shot to fame" after appearing in the film.

Besides acting, Sachdev appeared in more than fifty commercials, including television advertisements for RmKV, Colgate, ICICI Bank, Parachute, Saffola oil, and Kesar Badam Milk. She is best remembered for doing Rasna commercials with the actress Karisma Kapoor, and was nicknamed the "Rasna girl". She also appeared on an episode of the television game show Kya Aap Paanchvi Pass Se Tez Hain?.

Her last film was the Tamil drama-thriller Vetri Selvan, which was released in 2014. Sachdev had completed most of her part; director Rudhran stated that her footage would be retained "as a remembrance of the prodigy" and that the rest of her role would be patched up during the post-production.

== Death ==
Sachdev died in the Agni Air Dornier 228 crash near Jomsom Airport in Nepal on 14 May 2012, her 14th birthday. Sachdev's mother Geeta Sachdev, who accompanied her on the flight, also died. Their bodies were brought to Mumbai and cremated on 16 May 2012. After losing both his wife and daughter, Haresh Sachdev completely turned to a spiritual life.

== Filmography ==
Year	Title	Role	Language	Notes	Ref(s)
2004	Vellinakshatram	Ammukutty	Malayalam		
2004	Sathyam	Chinnukutty	Malayalam		
2009	Paa	Soumini "Somi"	Hindi		
2014	Vetri Selvan	Abhi	Tamil	Posthumous release	
