= Vetri Selvan =

2014 Indian film by Rudhran

- Directed by: Rudhran
- Written by: Rudhran
- Starring: Ajmal Ameer; Radhika Apte; Mano; Sheriff
- Cinematography: Ramesh Kumar
- Edited by: Kishore Te.
- Music by: Mani Sharma
- Production companies: Silicon Studios & Srushti Cinemas
- Distributed by: Silicon Studios
- Release date: 20 June 2014
- Running time: 138 minutes
- Country: India
- Language: Tamil

Vetri Selvan is a 2014 Indian Tamil language drama thriller film written and directed by Rudhran. Produced on Srushti Cinemas banner and Silicon Studios, the film stars Ajmal Ameer and Radhika Apte, while Mano and Sheriff appear in pivotal roles. The original music and background score of the film were composed by Mani Sharma. Cinematography was handled by Ramesh Kumar, while editing was by Kishore Te.

The film released on 19 June 2014. It has been screened in 125 theatres. This was the last film of child actress Taruni Sachdev, who died in an aeroplane crash two years before this film was released.

== Plot ==
The film revolves around three youths: Vetri Selvan, Ananthakrishnan, and Ganesh. They have been rejected by society, and the film tells of how they try to reform it.

== Cast ==
- Ajmal Ameer as Vetri Selvan
- Radhika Apte as Sujatha
- Mano as Ananthakrishnan
- Sheriff as Ganesh
- Ganja Karuppu
- Azhagam Perumal as Babu
- Thalaivasal Vijay as ashyam
- Dinesh Lamba as Dinesh
- Karate Raja as Police
- Pandu
- Swarna Thomas as Aarthi
- Taruni Sachdev as Abhi
- Aarthi as Aarthi
- Sanjana Singh
- Ramdoss
- Boys Rajan as Doctor

== Production ==
The film began shooting in March 2012, with director Rudhran revealing he had originally written the script with Vijay in mind to play the lead role. Ajmal was signed for the lead role, that of a student, and singer Mano was reported to play a "prominent character", that of a professor in the film, acting in a film again after Singaravelan. Sherif, the winner of a reality show, was given the role of a dancer.

During the shoot, Ajmal and the film's lead actress Radhika Apte were travelling in an auto on the hills of Ooty as part of the film when the auto rammed into a median, fell, and stumbled down the road. The shoot halted for a couple of hours, giving time for Ajmal to recuperate. The director had to find another auto similar to the previous one to continue with the shooting, as the initial one was heavily damaged during the accident. Child actress Taruni Sachdev, who had played a supporting role as Apte's sister in the film, died in a plane crash in May 2012. She had completed most of her part however, with Rudhran stating that her footages would be retained and "as a remembrance of the prodigy" and that the rest of her part would be patched up during the post-production.

== Soundtrack ==
The film's music was composed by Mani Sharma, scoring for an Ajmal film for the second time after Thiru Thiru Thuru Thuru (2009). The audio was launched by director Bala on 2 November 2012, while directors Ameer and Seenu Ramasamy, producer G. Dhananjayan and writer Tamilachi Thangapandian were also present. All songs were written by Madhan Karky. Behindwoods wrote:"All the album feels like vintage Mani Sharma, but somehow that can be a double edge sword as it does have a dated feel amidst the more trendy styles that the audience subscribes to today".

- "Megathile" - Shreya Ghoshal
- "Adidas" - Mano, Rahul Nambiar, Ranjith
- "Enna Enna" - Haricharan, Mahathi
- "Vittu Vittu" - Rahul Nambiar, Bhargavi Pillai
- "Deivatha Pole" - Hema Chandran

== Critical reception ==
Baradwaj Rangan from The Hindu wrote, "A filmmaker sees something horrible. It gnaws at his soul. After nights spent writhing in torment, he decides that he needs to exorcise those feelings — and what better way than to create a work of art, with each scene, every line of dialogue a stinging whiplash on the aspect of society that reduced him to this state? And then he discovers it doesn’t quite work that way. There’s an audience out there, and they don’t give a rat’s behind about his suffering. They want entertainment — songs, action, comedy, romance. There are films that manage this balancing act well. Vetri Selvan isn’t one of them.". The Times of India gave the film 2.5 stars out of 5 and wrote, "Even if we set aside the question of whether movies should really have a message, the sincerity in wanting to spread a message doesn't reflect in the inelegant filmmaking. The fault lies in the formulaic storytelling. The director chooses the tried and tested trope of a lighter first half with a mystery around the protagonist and a serious latter half where secrets are revealed and a point is made. But the problem here is that the initial set-up is very much non-existent".

The New Indian Express wrote, "An insipid screenplay, lacklustre narration and some uninspiring performances make sure that Vetriselvan leaves no impact". Sify wrote, "The intentions of director Rudharan is honourable but the way he has executed the film is shoddy and boring. The story and treatment is a long yawn. The director has tried to fit in as many commercial items and in the process the film loses its steam. Nothing much to recommend in the film which is a wasted and futile effort, though the message it tries to convey is topical". Behindwoods.com gave it 1.25 stars out of 5 and wrote, "Rudran has genuinely attempted to pack the first half with comedy and finish the movie off on a sentimental note, however the lack of quality humour and an overdose of drama backstabs the engaging factor of the movie. Vetri Selvan comes out with a genuine social cause, but fails to impress", calling it "An interesting concept that isn’t presented appropriately". Indiaglitz.com wrote, "the noble intentions have not been executed well and the end product awfully falls flat. The film ends up as a case study of how not to convey a good message".
