= Sathyam (2004 film) =

- DVD cover
- Directed by: Vinayan
- Written by: Vinayan
- Produced by: Vaisakh Rajan
- Starring: Prithviraj Sukumaran; Priyamani; Taruni Sachdev; Thilakan; Anandaraj; Lalu Alex
- Cinematography: Shaji Kumar
- Edited by: G. Murali
- Music by: M. Jayachandran
- Release date: 27 August 2004
- Running time: 153 minutes
- Country: India
- Language: Malayalam
- Budget: ₹1.75 crore

Sathyam (transl. Truth) is a 2004 Indian Malayalam-language action thriller film written and directed by Vinayan, starring Prithviraj Sukumaran, Priyamani, Taruni Sachdev, Anandaraj, Thilakan and Lalu Alex. This was Priyamani's debut film in Malayalam and the last Malayalam film of Taruni Sachdev.

== Plot ==
The story circles around Sanjeev Kumar who is awaiting his selection into the police force. But it was being delayed by the corrupt Police Commissioner Mambilli Mukundan Menon, who is backed up by his political and underground relationships and has a grudge against Sanjeev's father Ayyappan Nair. When things go beyond a limit, Sanjeev gets fed up, and locks up Mukundan in a secret location. Sanjeev gets selected for the police force and joins as a Sub-Inspector near his home town, and gets a lot of praise for his work in curbing crime in the city.

In the meantime, Mukundan manages to escape the secret location. Sanjeev manages to prove that Mukundan is insane and puts him in an asylum. But he faces many obstacles. His wife Sona and he gets shot by Mukundan's men and his younger brother Prakash during a fight when they were kidnapping Sona. Sanjeev kills Prakash and saves Sona. His niece Chinnukutty and Ayyappan gets kidnapped by Mukundan and his men and Mukundan kills Ayyappan. Sanjeev fights off Mukundan and his men. Sanjeev kills Mukundan and saves Chinnukutty.

== Cast ==
- Prithviraj Sukumaran as Sub inspector Sanjeev Kumar
- Anandaraj as City Police Commissioner Mambilly Mukundan Menon IPS (Voiceover by Shobi Thilakan),the main antagonist
- Thilakan as Head Constable 'Sathyavan' Ayyappan Nair, Sanjeev's father
- Priyamani as Sona, Sanjeev's lover turned wife (Voiceover by Sreeja Ravi)
- Taruni Sachdev as Chinnukutty, Sanjeev's niece
- Rajeev as Minister Mambilly Madhavan Menon, Mukundan's and Prakash's eldest brother
- Suresh Krishna as Mambilly Prakash Menon,an abkari contractor and mukundan's and Madhavan's younger brother
- Lalu Alex as ACP James Manjooran IPS
- Captain Raju as City Police Commissioner S.Sudharshan IPS
- Aniyappan as Balan, Sanjeev's friend
- Venu Nagavally as Chief Minister
- Narayanankutty as ASI Kunjiraman
- Kochu Preman as Police Constable Menon
- Baburaj as Mattancherry Martin
- Kollam Thulasi as ACP Anirudan IPS
- K. P. A. C. Saji as CI Yousuf
- Vinod Paul as Alex, Martin's younger brother
- Mafia Sasi as Gunda Das
- Poornima Anand as Rajalakshmi, Mukundan's wife
- Bindu Ramakrishnan as Sanjeev's mother
- Ramya Salim as Sanjeev's sister and Chinnukutty's mother
- Babu Swamy as Raman Nair, Sona's father
- Manka Mahesh as Sona's mother
- James as Gopala Pillai / G. P. Pillai

== Soundtrack ==
Sathyam Original Soundtrack

Soundtrack album by M. Jayachandran
- Released: 2004
- Genre: Filmi

The film's soundtrack contains six songs, all composed by M. Jayachandran. Lyrics were by Kaithapram Damodaran Namboothiri and S. Ramesan Nair .

#	Title	Singer(s)	Raga(s)
1	"Be Happy Man"	Jyotsna, Vijay Yesudas	
2	"Kaatte Kaatte (M)"	M. G. Sreekumar	
3	"Kaatte Kaatte" (F)	Kalyani Nair	
4	"Kallakkurumbi"	Sujatha Mohan, Baby Vidya	
5	"Nee En Sundari"	Karthik, K S Chitra	Abheri
6	"Whisile Whisile"	Alex Kayyalaykkal, Ganga	
