= Vellinakshatram (2004 film) =

- Directed by: Vinayan
- Written by: Vinayan
- Produced by: Babu Panicker
- Starring: Prithviraj Sukumaran; Taruni Sachdev
- Cinematography: Shaji Kumar
- Edited by: G. Murali
- Music by: M. Jayachandran
- Distributed by: Swargachitra
- Release date: 2 April 2004
- Running time: 156 minutes
- Country: India
- Language: Malayalam

Vellinakshatram (transl. Silver Star) is a 2004 Malayalam-language horror comedy film by Vinayan starring Prithviraj Sukumaran and Taruni Sachdev with Meenakshi, Karthika Mathew, Jayasurya, Jagathy Sreekumar, Jagadeesh, Siddique, Salim Kumar and Thilakan in pivotal roles. The film depicts paranormal events revolving around Vinod's daughter Ammu, which eventually leads to the revelations of several shocking truths from the past and the inevitable death of the cruel Mahendra Varma.

== Plot ==
Vinod is hopelessly in love with Aswathy of prestigious Lakshmipuram royal family, a household that stood as a symbol of grandeur. Their relationship was disapproved by her family who force her to marry someone of higher status. The night before her wedding, Aswathy elope with Vinod and get married. After few months the news of Aswathy's pregnancy softens hearts of her family and with the anticipation of a new beginning, the couple is welcomed back to the palace by her mother, uncles, Pooradam Thirunal Valiya Koyi Thampuran,(Kuttikrishnan) and Cheriya Koyi Thampuran, (Kochuraman), along with their wives, Bhagyalakshmi and Shakunthala Devi.

However, Aswathy dies in front of her mother during her childbirth after seeing something supernatural, leaving her mother bedridden and the whole family shattered. Their daughter Ammukutty, grows up to be the darling of the family. Soon an unsettling presence begin to pervade the household. The elders believes that Ammu was possessed by Aswathy's spirit and distances themselves from Ammu.

Desperate, Vinod decides to get help of Indu, a caretaker for Ammu. But soon enough they find out that Indu herself was not who she seemed and the family was gripped by the horrifying realization that Indu, too, was possessed by an entity. In their desperation, the Koyi Thampurans turned to Valliyankattu Thirumeni, a revered exorcist known for his command over dark forces. He listened intently to their woes, his wisdom stretching beyond the realm of the living. After careful deliberation, he provided them with an enchanted plate, instructing them to bury it deep within the grounds of the original, now-deserted Lakshmipuram palace, the very place where the origins of their suffering were rooted.

Armed with resolve, the family set out to lay to rest the malevolence that haunted them, yet as they neared the forsaken palace, an unspeakable terror awaited them. Shadows took form, and from the depths of darkness emerged the mummified figures of Ammu and Indu, their eyes vacant, their presence chilling. The mere sight of them was enough to unravel the strongest of minds, and before long, the once-esteemed members of the royal family succumbed to madness, their sanity slipping away like grains of sand through desperate fingers.

With the house in disarray, a new hope emerged in the form of Dr. Sundaresan, a skilled psychiatrist who arrived to tend to the afflicted. His presence brought a semblance of order, yet his rational mind sought answers beyond superstition. Meanwhile, news of his brothers' condition reached Mahendra Varma, the third sibling and also Sundaresan's close friend, who immediately returned from Kuwait, his concern overshadowed only by the sheer curiosity that gripped him upon setting eyes on Indu. There was something mesmerizing about her, an ethereal beauty that lured him like a moth to a flame. His desire to possess her grew insatiable, but what began as infatuation soon turned to horror. As he attempted to seduce her, a bone-chilling truth was laid bare—Indu was no mortal woman. She was a spirit, bound to the world by an injustice so deep that even death had failed to silence her wrath.

Trembling with realization, Mahendran sought answers alongside his brothers and Sundaresan, and together, they once again approached Valliyankattu Thirumeni, who finally unraveled the sinister history that shackled their family to a cycle of vengeance. Through his revelations, the past was brought to life, transporting them to a time when Lakshmipuram stood under the shadow of Tipu Sultan’s advancing forces. It was an era of treachery and shifting allegiances, where the fate of kingdoms lay in the hands of those willing to betray their own.

Manaveda Varma, a Keralite king, in his desperation to safeguard his dominion, had forged an alliance with the British, seeking their military aid to repel Tipu Sultan's onslaught. But the British, ruthless in their greed, demanded a price far greater than loyalty—they sought flesh. The king, in his cowardice, bartered not gold nor land, but the dignity of a woman. Indumathi Devi, wife of the valiant general warrior Chandrachoodan, became the pawn in this treacherous game. Manavedan, exploiting the friendship between Indumathi and his own daughter, lured her to the palace under the guise of trust. But as she arrived, cradling her young daughter Ammu in her arms, the truth was laid bare before her—the man she had once revered had sold her honor to the British.

Betrayal ignited a fire within her, and in an act of defiance, she seized the king's sword, determined to strike down the foreign oppressor. But fate was unkind. Before her blade could taste justice, Manavedan himself wrenched the weapon from her grasp and, without hesitation, beheaded her where she stood. Her body was cast into the depths of the palace, her cries of anguish swallowed by the cold stone, and with her was buried her daughter Ammu, still alive, doomed to perish in darkness.

But vengeance does not rest in forgotten tombs. The sins of the past wove themselves into the fabric of time, and the spirits of the wronged returned, seeking retribution. With the cycle of reincarnation in motion, the betrayers and the betrayed were reborn in the present. Aswathy, the princess of the past, had met her fate at childbirth, her death an echo of the punishment she had once orchestrated. Mahendran, haunted by nightmares, had always been destined to pay for the sins of his former self. A prophecy had foretold that a child bearing the "Karthika" star would bring about his downfall. Fearful of his fate, he had secretly murdered his own newborn niece, ignorant of the consequences that would follow. With her birth, he had lost his sight in one eye, and now, with Ammu's arrival—another child born under the same star—his hearing had begun to fail.

In his desperation, he sought to eliminate Ammu, dispatching men to rid him of the child and her father, but destiny could not be denied. Vinod and Ammu evaded their hunters, seeking sanctuary in a final, desperate act of exorcism. Once more, Valliyankattu Thirumeni summoned his powers, engaging in a fierce battle against the vengeful spirit of Indumathi. As he chanted the sacred verses, his strength faltered, his body succumbing to exhaustion. Yet, it was then that Ammu, the very embodiment of Indumathi's wrath, emerged before them all. Her gaze, fierce and unrelenting, fell upon Mahendran. No force of the living or the dead could halt her now. As he begged for mercy, the past converged upon him, and in one final act of vengeance, she took his life, her mission fulfilled, her spirit released from the bonds of retribution.

With Mahendran's demise, the shadows that clung to the royal family dissolved, the spirits finding their long-sought peace. As the first light of dawn seeped into the palace, Ammu, now free from the torment of the past, took the hands of Vinod and Indu, stepping into a life untouched by the curses of history. The ghosts of Lakshmipuram had finally been laid to rest, and the family, scarred but whole, embraced the peace that had so long eluded them.

== Cast ==
- Prithviraj Sukumaran in a dual role as:
  - Vinod Varma
  - Chandrachoodan
- Taruni Sachdev in a dual role as:
  - Ammukutty Varma (Vinod and Aswathy's daughter)
  - Ammukutty (Chandrachoodan and Indumathi's daughter)
- Meenakshi in a dual role as:
  - Indu
  - Indumathi Devi, Chandrachoodan's wife
- Karthika in a dual role as:
  - Aswathy Varma Thampuratti, Vinod's wife
  - The princess who betrayed Indumathi
- Jagathy Sreekumar as Pooradam Thirunal Valiya Koyi Thampuran (Kuttikrishnan)
- Jagadish as Pooradam Thirunal Cheriya Koyi Thampuran (Kochuraman)
- Siddique in a dual role as:
  - Mahendra Varma
  - Manaveda Varma
- Salim Kumar as Dr. Sundareshan, Mahendran's friend
- Thilakan as Valliyankattu Thirumeni
- Jayasurya as Unnikrishnan, Indu's fiancé
- Indrans as Palace Superintendent Kochunni
- Shobha Mohan as Dr Parvathi Bayi Thampuratti, Aswathi's mother
- Bindu Panicker as Bhagyalakshmi Thampuratti, Kuttikrishnan's wife
- Praseetha Menon as Sakunthaladevi Thampuratti, Kochuraman's wife
- Jose Pellissery as Konnanattil Shankaran, Indu's father
- Valsala Menon as Valiya Thampuratti (Cameo Appearance)
- Rajan P. Dev as Meppadathu Valiya Thirumeni, Valliyankattu Thirumeni's mentor (Cameo Appearance)
- Cochin Haneefa as CI Velayudhan (Cameo Appearance)
- Baiju Ezhupunna as SI Sugunan (Cameo Appearance)
- Kalpana as School Principal (Cameo Appearance)
- Machan Varghese as School Teacher (Cameo Appearance)
- Ramya Sudha as Rajalakshmi, Mahendran's wife

== Soundtrack ==
The film's soundtrack contains 8 songs, all composed by M. Jayachandran. Lyrics were by S. Ramesan Nair and Kaithapram.

#	Title	Singer(s)
1	"Chandana Mukile" (F)	K. S. Chitra, Chorus
2	"Chakkarakkili"	Sujatha Mohan
3	"Kookuru Kukku Kurukkan"	Baby Vidya
4	"Pinnapple Penne"	Franco, Jyotsna
5	"Chandana Mukile" (M)	Sudeep Kumar
6	"Maanazhako" (M)	K. J. Yesudas
7	"Maanazhako" (F)	Sujatha Mohan
8	"Vellinakshathram" (Theme Music)	M. Jayachandran, Chorus

== Box office ==
The film was a commercial success.
