= Karnali Air =

IATA	ICAO	Call sign
—	—	—
- Ceased operations: 2001
- Operating bases: Tribhuvan International Airport
- Fleet size: 6 (at closure)
- Headquarters: Kathmandu, Nepal
- Key people: Narayan Singh Pun (founder)
- Employees: 80 (2001)

Karnali Air Pvt. Ltd. was a helicopter airline based at Tribhuvan International Airport in Kathmandu, Nepal, operating chartered helicopter services. It merged with Necon Air in 2001 but kept operating under its name.

== History ==
In 2001 Karnali Air was, along with Shangri-La Air, part of an ‘operational merge’ with Necon Air. The Executive Chairman of Karnali Air, Narayan Singh Pun took on the position of Executive Chairman and managing director of Necon Air.

== Fleet ==
At the time of closure, Karnali Air operated the following aircraft:

Karnali Air fleet
Aircraft	In fleet	Notes
Eurocopter Ecureuil	6	

== Accidents and incidents ==
- 19 September 2002 – A Karnali Air Eurocopter Ecureuil on a medivac mission was attacked in Jubu, Solukhumbu and set on fire by members of the People's Liberation Army, Nepal during the Nepalese Civil War. The pilot and one passenger were abducted but let go one day later.
- 8 August 2006 – A Karnali Air Mil Mi-8MTV-1 crashed at Tribhuvan International Airport during a ground check-up. Seven people were injured.
