= Kowang =

Kowang कोवाङ
- Village
- Kowang

- Location in Nepal Kowang (Nepal)
- Coordinates: 28.69°N 83.58°E
- Country: Nepal
- Province: Gandaki Province
- District: Mustang District

Population (1991)
  - Total: 659
- Time zone: UTC+5:45 (Nepal Time)

Kowang is a village in Mustang District and former village development committee (VDC) in the Dhawalagiri Zone of northern Nepal. At the time of the 1991 Nepal census it had a population of 659 people living in 170 individual households.

The VDC was abolished along with the other VDCs in March 2017 (replaced by Rural Municipalities), becoming part of the Thasang Rural Municipality, while the Dhawalagiri Zone was abolished along with the other Zones (replaced by provinces) in 2015, becoming part of Gandaki Province.
