= Narayan Singh Pun =

Nepali politician

Personal details
- Died: February 21, 2008 New Delhi, India
- Party: Nepal Samata Party

Narayan Singh Pun (Nepali: नारायणसिंह पुन; died February 21, 2008, in New Delhi, India) was a Nepalese politician. Prior to starting his political career, he had been a helicopter pilot and lieutenant colonel in the Royal Nepal Army. He was from Myagdi District.

He was elected to the Pratinidhi Sabha in the 1999 election on behalf of the Nepali Congress. He was later expelled from the party on the grounds of collaborating with the king. He later founded the Nepal Samata Party.

Pun founded Karnali Air in 2001.

Narayan Singh Pun died at a hospital in New Delhi, India, on February 21, 2008, from an infection that had emerged after a kidney transplant. He was 59 years old.
