= Gharpajhong Rural Municipality =

Gharpajhong Rural Municipality घरपझोङ गाउँपालिका
- Gaunpalika
- Location in Nepal
- Coordinates: 28.784746°N 83.738181°E
- Country: Nepal
- Province: Gandaki
- District: Mustang District

Population
  - Total: 3,029
- Time zone: UTC+5:45 (Nepal Time)
- Website: http://gharapjhongmun.gov.np/

Gharapjhong Rural Municipality (Gharapjhong Gaupalika) (Nepali: घरपझोङ गाउँपालिका) is a Gaunpalika, or rural municipality, in Mustang district in Gandaki Province of Nepal. On 12 March 2017, the government of Nepal implemented a new local administrative structure, in which Village Development Committees were replaced with municipal and Village Councils. Gharapjhong is one of these 753 local units.

== Demographics ==
At the time of the 2011 Nepal census, Gharpajhong Rural Municipality had a population of 3,736. Of these, 61.6% spoke Nepali, 23.6% Thakali, 6.5% Gurung, 1.9% Magar, 1.6% Tamang, 1.0% Belhare, 1.0% Sherpa, 0.7% Maithili, 0.5% Newar, 0.4% Bhojpuri, 0.4% Rai, 0.4% Tharu and 0.4% other languages as their first language.

In terms of ethnicity/caste, 32.7% were Thakali, 13.2% Kami, 13.1% Gurung, 10.0% Magar, 6.5% Damai/Dholi, 5.5% Hill Brahmin, 4.6% Tamang, 4.3% Chhetri, 1.6% Newar, 1.4% Sherpa, 1.1% Rai, 1.1% Sarki, 1.0% Badi, 1.0% Tharu, 0.6% Thakuri, and 2.3% others.

In terms of religion, 52.2% were Hindu, 44.9% Buddhist, 2.2% Christian, 0.2% Bon, 0.1% Muslim and 0.3% others.

In terms of literacy, 75.6% could read and write, 2.2% could only read and 22.1% could neither read nor write.
