= Thasang Rural Municipality =

Thasang Rural Municipality थासाङ गाउँपालिका
- Gaunpalika
- Location in Nepal
- Coordinates: 28.692431°N 83.617854°E
- Country: Nepal
- Province: Gandaki
- District: Mustang District

Population
  - Total: 2,912
- Time zone: UTC+5:45 (Nepal Time)
- Website: http://thasangmun.gov.np/

Thasang Rural Municipality (Nepali: थासाङ गाउँपालिका, romanized: Thāsāṅa gā'um̐pālikā) is a Gaunpalika, or rural municipality, in Mustang district in Gandaki Province of Nepal. On 12 March 2017, the government of Nepal implemented a new local administrative structure, in which Village Development Committees were replaced by municipal and Village Councils. Thasang is one of these 753 local units.

== Demographics ==
At the time of the 2011 Nepal census, Thasang Rural Municipality had a population of 3,093. Of these, 76.3% spoke Nepali, 14.7% Thakali, 4.1% Magar, 0.9% Tamang, 0.8% Gurung, 0.7% Sign language, 0.6% Kham, 0.4% Rai and 1.0% other languages as their first language.

In terms of ethnicity/caste, 34.1% were Thakali, 17.8% Kami, 17.0% Magar, 10.4% Damai/Dholi, 4.7% Chhetri, 3.4% Hill Brahmin, 2.5% Chhantyal, 2.0% Gurung, 1.6% Tamang, 1.2% Sarki, 1.1% other Dalit, 1.0% Rai, 0.9% Newar, 0.7% Sherpa, 0.4% Limbu and 1.2% others.

In terms of religion, 63.0% were Hindu, 34.5% Buddhist, 1.7% Christian, 0.2% Kirati, 0.1% Prakriti and 0.5% others.

In terms of literacy, 72.8% could read and write, 2.4% could only read and 24.7% could neither read nor write.
