= Jomsom Airport =

Domestic airport serving Jomsom, Gandaki Province, Nepal

Jomsom Airport जोमसोम विमानस्थल
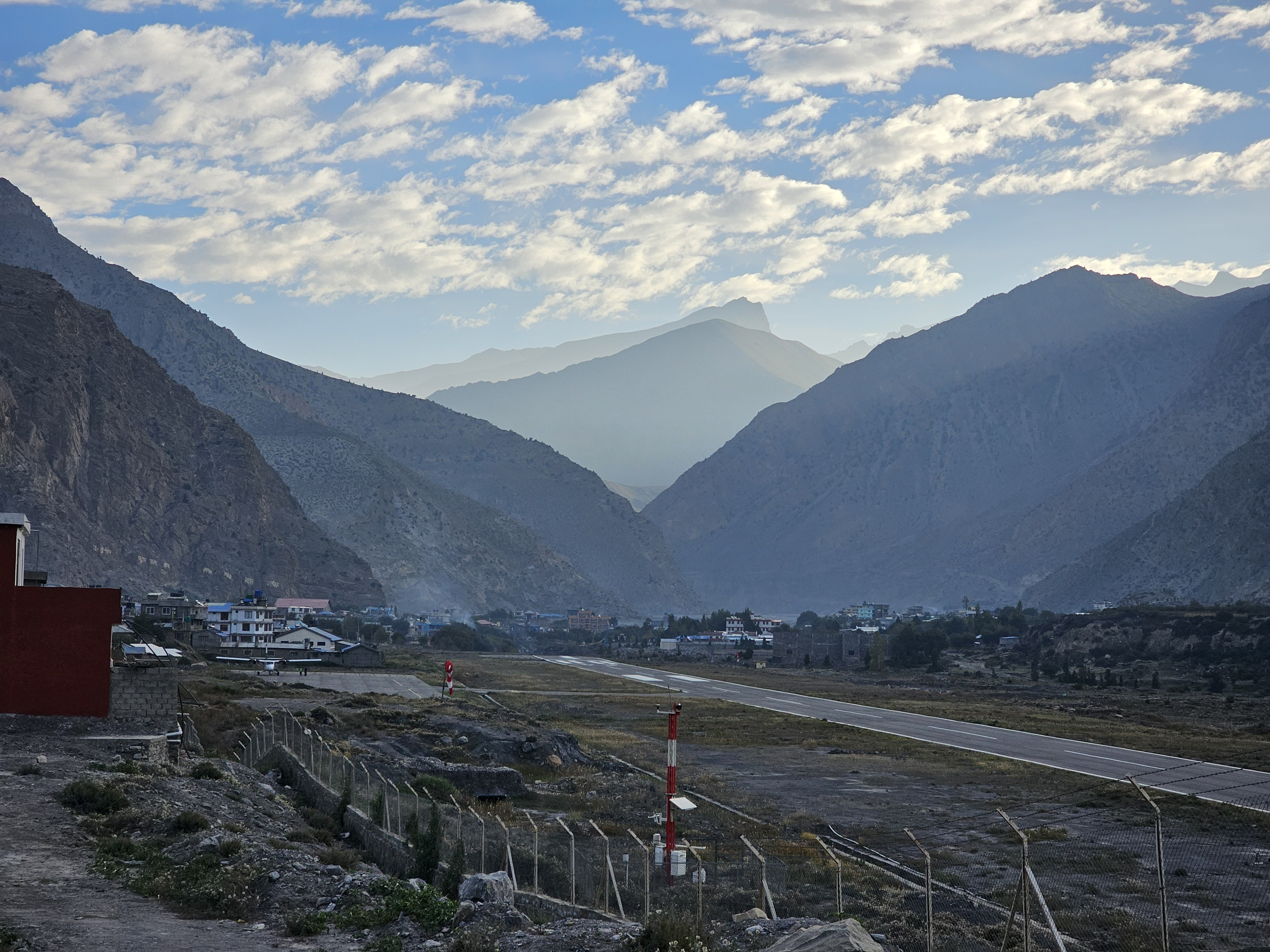
- IATA: JMO; ICAO: VNJS

Summary
- Airport type: Public
- Owner: Government of Nepal
- Operator: Civil Aviation Authority of Nepal
- Serves: Jomsom, Gandaki Province, Nepal
- Elevation AMSL: 8,976 ft (2,736 m)
- Coordinates: 28°46′56″N 83°43′21″E
- Website: jomsom.caanepal.gov.np

Map
- Location of airport in Nepal

Runways
Direction	Length		Surface
Direction	m	ft	Surface
06/24	739	2,424	Asphalt

Jomsom Airport (Nepali: जोमसोम विमानस्थल, IATA: JMO, ICAO: VNJS) is a domestic airport located in Jomsom serving Mustang District, a district in Gandaki Province in Nepal. It serves as the gateway to Mustang District that includes Jomsom, Kagbeni, Tangbe, and Lo Manthang, and Muktinath temple, which is a popular pilgrimage for Nepalis and Indian pilgrims.

== Facilities ==
Jomsom Airport is located adjacent to the Kali Gandaki River at the northern end of the Kali Gandaki Gorge. The airport resides at an elevation of 8,976 feet (2,736 m) above mean sea level. It has one asphalt paved runway designated 06/24 which measures 2,424 by 66 feet (739 m × 20 m). There is a downslope of 1.75% up to about 418 feet (127 m) from the threshold of runway 06. There is a terminal building for passengers.

There are daily flights between Pokhara Airport (domestic) and Jomsom between 0600 and 1215 local time in good weather.

The airport is available throughout the year but visibility is not adequate for visual flight rules flight about 15% of the time. As high wind speeds often prevent airport operation after midday, airlines schedule flights to Jomsom for the early morning when wind speeds are low. Airlines operate a shuttle service between Jomsom and Pokhara and planes are turned around as rapidly as possible at each airport in order to complete as many flights as possible before wind speeds at Jomsom become too high or visibility forces the suspension of flights.

Although the flying distance is short and the flight time is just 20 minutes, Jomsom Airport is located on the north side of the Himalayas while Pokhara is on the south side. The STOL aircraft servicing this route are unable to fly at the altitudes required to fly over the Himalayas.

The heat from the sun in the Mustang District causes air to rise and draws strong southerly winds through the Kali Gandaki River gorge, resulting in strong winds at Jomsom airport after early morning. Cloud cover, changing visibility, and high winds, often mean flights are delayed or the airport closed.

There are very high mountains between Pokhara and Jomsom, including Dhaulagiri (8,167 m or 26,795 ft) and Tukuche (6,920 m or 22,703 ft) on the west and Nilgiri Central (6,940 m or 22,769 ft) and Annapurna (8,091 m or 26,545 ft) on the east, of the Kali Gandaki River gorge and other high terrain, that prevent planes flying over the mountains and are hazards for the planes flying through the gorge.

The high terrain to the east and west of the gorge is hazardous to planes on final approach to the airport from the south, or when an approach from the north is aborted and a go-around is attempted. With Jomsom Airport located at the head of the gorge, the high terrain surrounding the airport is a hazard whenever a go-around is required and when, as is frequently necessary after mid-morning, planes from Pokhara must overfly the airport and turn in the Mustang area in order to land into the strong southerly winds.

== Airlines and destinations ==
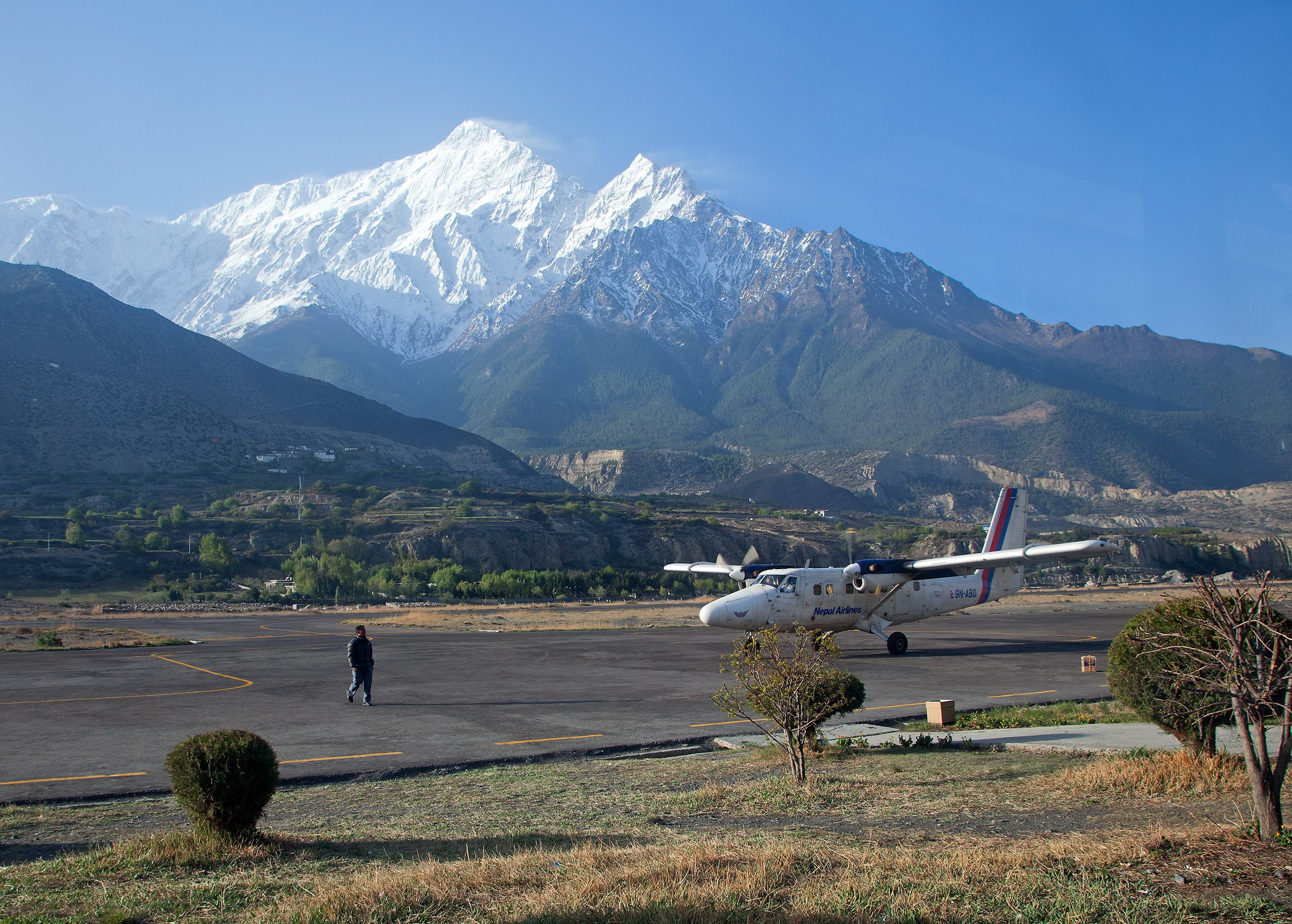
A Nepal Airlines plane at Jomsom Airport

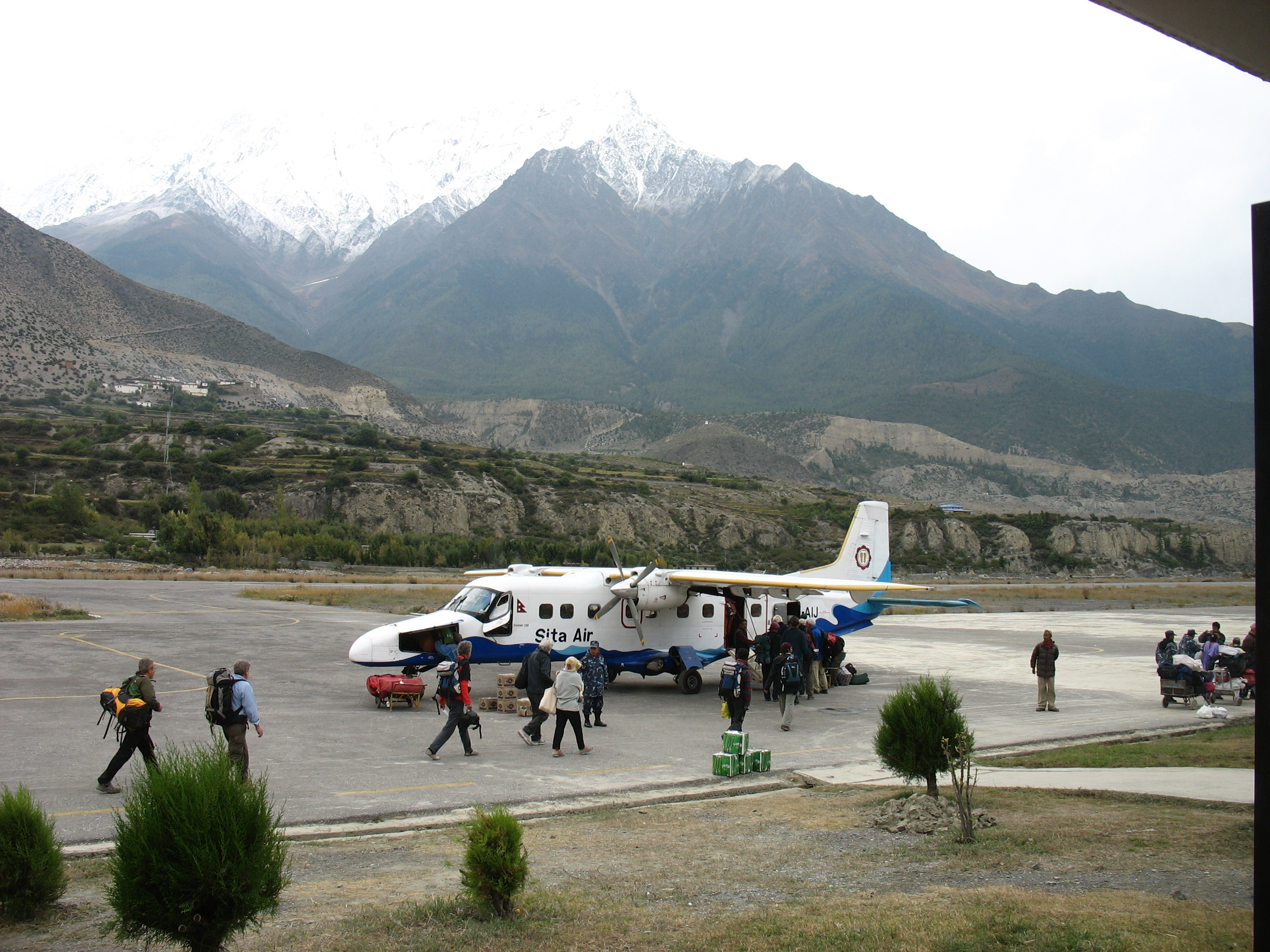
Passengers board a Sita Air flight at Jomsom Airport

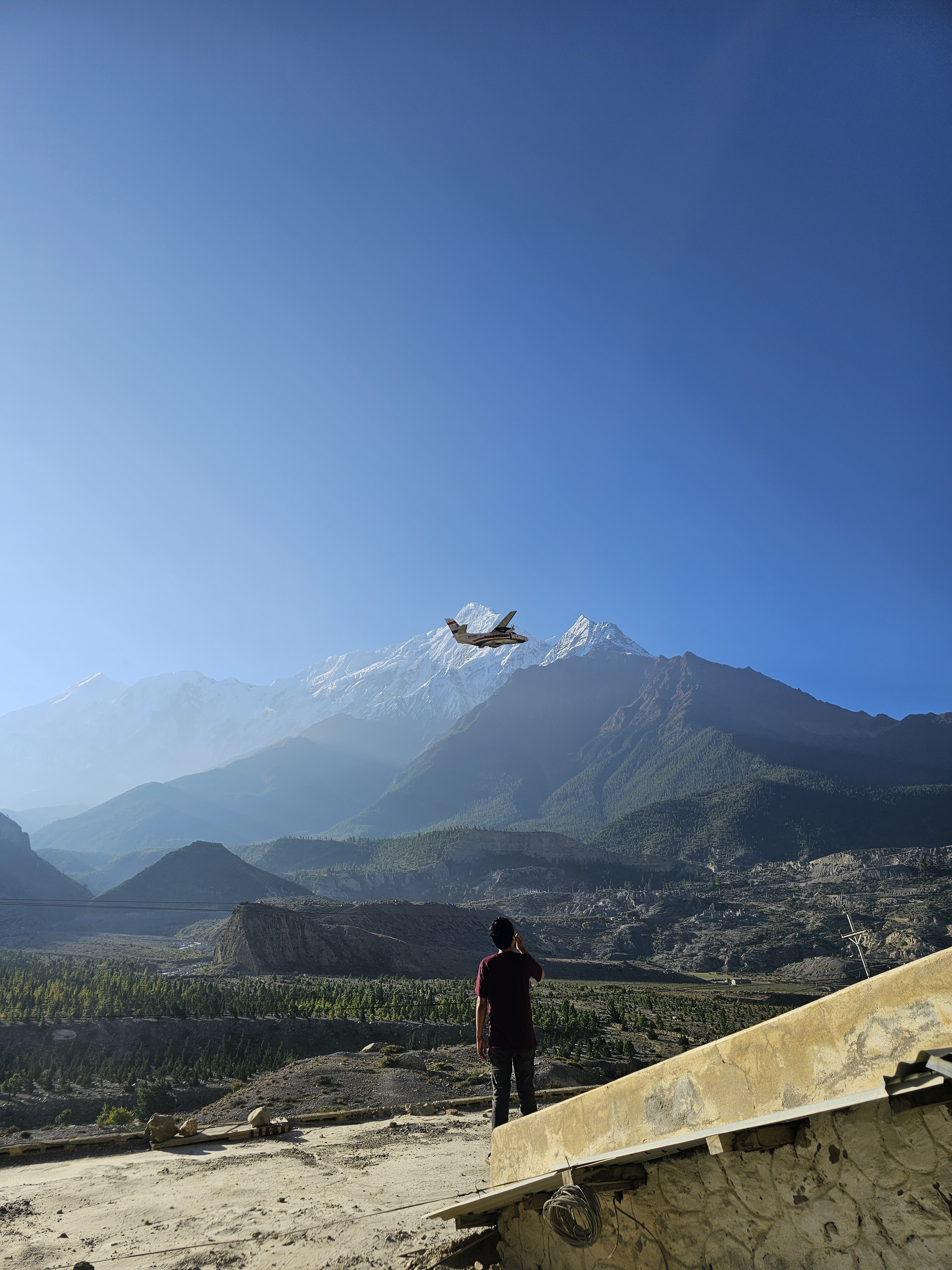
A plane flying from Jomsom Airport towards the mountain.

Airlines	Destinations
Sita Air	Pokhara–Domestic
Summit Air	Pokhara–Domestic
Tara Air	Pokhara–Domestic

== Accidents & Incidents ==
- On 27 February 1970, a Nepalese Royal Flight de Havilland Canada DHC-6 Twin Otter crashed while taking off at Jomsom Airport, killing one passenger. Three passengers and one crew member survived but the plane was written off.
- On 8 November 1993, a Nepal Airways Harbin Yunshuji Y-12-II scheduled passenger flight overran the runway while landing and fell into the river. There were no fatalities but the plane was written off.
- On 21 August 1998, a Lumbini Airways de Havilland Canada DHC-6 Twin Otter leased from the Air Transport Support Centre (ATSC, of the Nepalese CAA) on a late morning scheduled passenger flight from Jomsom to Pokhara impacted Mount Annapurna near Ghorepani at the 7000 ft level. All 18 occupants, three crew and 15 passengers were killed and the plane was damaged beyond repair.
- On 14 May 2012, Agni Air Flight CHT Dornier 228, a scheduled passenger flight from Pokhara to Jomsom, crashed into the side of a hill near Marpha village 5 km (3.1 mls) southwest of Jomsom Airport, killing 15 of 21 people on board. The flight attendant and five of the eighteen passengers survived but the plane was damaged beyond repair. The crash claimed the life of Indian child actress Taruni Sachdev. The head of Nepal's national rescue department reported that the pilot told air traffic control moments before the crash that he was diverting back to Pokhara.
- On 16 May 2013, Nepal Airlines Flight 555 de Havilland DHC-6 Twin Otter, a scheduled passenger flight from Pokhara to Jomsom carrying 18 adult passengers, one infant, and three crew, crashed while landing at Jomsom at 8:30 AM and fell onto the bank of the Kali Gandaki River. The plane was extensively damaged. There were no fatalities but three people, two crew and one passenger, sustained serious injuries and one crew and six passengers sustained minor injuries. Eight of the plane's passengers were Japanese tourists while the three crew members and remaining passengers were Nepali. The final report found that the plane landed at excessive speed and too far from the runway threshold in the opposite direction to the notified direction in use with an eight to twelve knot (15 to 22 km/h) tailwind. The aircraft departed the runway to the right side during braking, re-entered the runway under power at speed, and attempted to take off for a go-around with the flaps retracted. With insufficient speed and lift, the takeoff attempt failed and the aircraft overran the runway, breached the perimeter fence, and fell into the river. The Investigation identified inappropriate actions of the aircraft commander in respect of both the initial landing and his response to the subsequent runway excursion and also cited the absence of effective Crew Resource Management.
- On 24 February 2016, Tara Air Flight 193, a Viking Air DHC-6-400 Twin Otter with registration 9N-AHH, a scheduled domestic passenger flight with 23 people on board departing from Pokhara at 07:50 am for Jomsom went missing eight minutes after takeoff. Three helicopters dispatched to search for the missing aircraft were initially hampered by bad weather. Hours later, the wreckage and several charred bodies were found. There were no survivors. The crash was the twenty-second loss of a DHC-6 in Nepal, the seventh-deadliest aircraft crash in Nepal, and the world's fourth-deadliest accident involving a DHC-6. It was found that en route, flying under visual flight rules, the flight had deviated to the left and climbed to 12,000 feet (3,658 m) to avoid clouds before beginning a descent to 10,000 feet (3,048 m) after entering a cloud. The captain initiated another climb one minute before impact shortly after the ground proximity warning system (GPWS) sounded at 10,200 feet (3,109 m). Flying in cloud with little visibility the plane struck a mountainside at 10,700 feet (3,261 m) and came to a rest at 10,982 feet (3,347 m) near Dana village, Myagdi district.
- On 29 May 2022, Tara Air Flight 197 from Pokhara Airport lost contact with ATC while approaching Jomsom. The wreckage was found 20 hours later on the side of a mountain in Thasang, Mustang District; none of the 22 on board survived.

== See also ==
- List of airports in Nepal
