= Pokhara Airport (domestic) =

Airport in Nepal

Coordinates: 28°12′03″N 083°58′55″E

Pokhara Airport पोखरा विमानस्थल
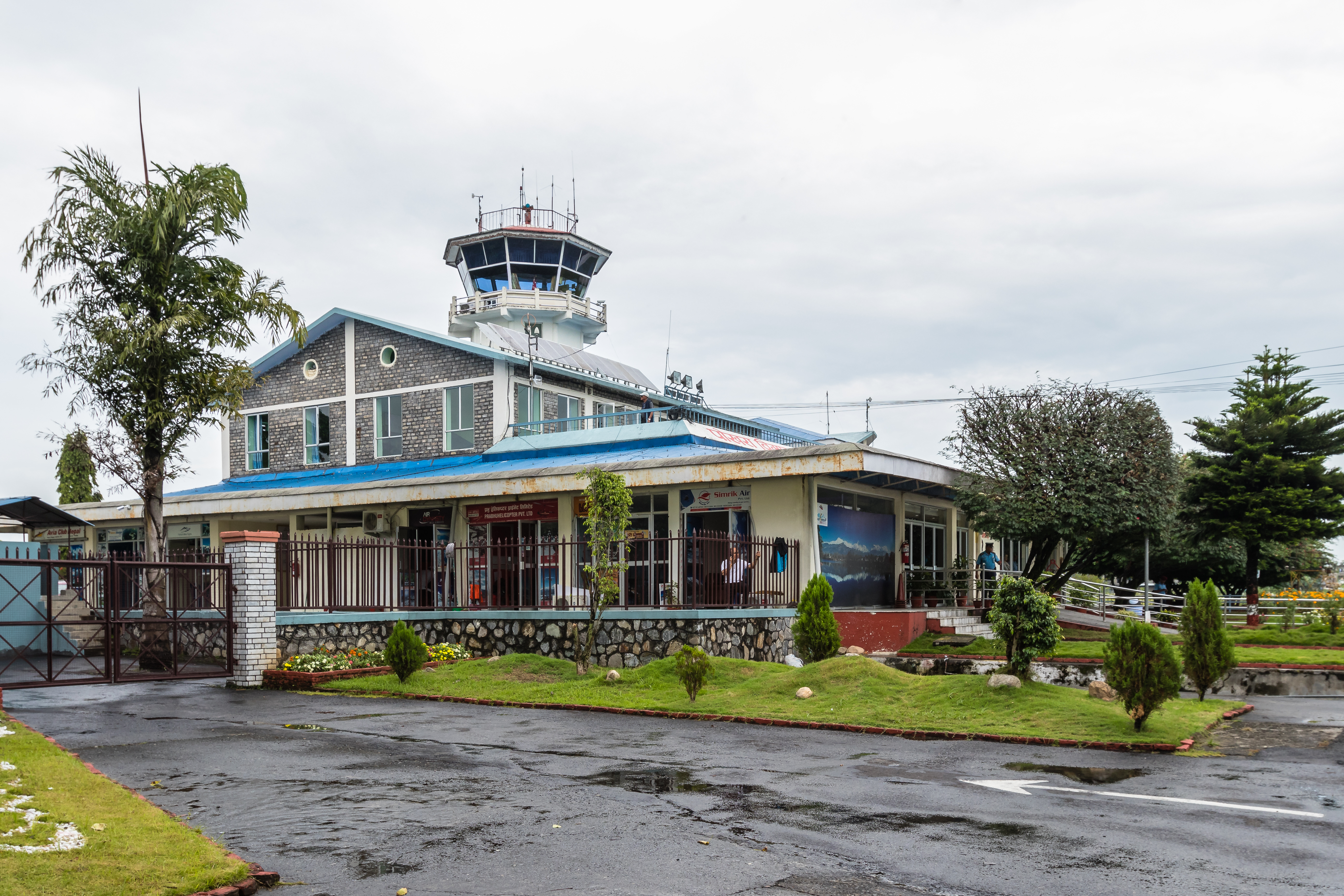
- IATA: PKR; ICAO: VNPK

Summary
- Airport type: Public
- Owner: Government of Nepal
- Operator: Civil Aviation Authority of Nepal
- Serves: Pokhara, Nepal
- Focus city for: Tara Air
- Elevation AMSL: 2,712 ft (827 m)

Map
- Location of airport in Nepal Pokhara Airport (Nepal)

Runways
Direction	Length		Surface
Direction	m	ft	Surface
04/22	1,433	4,701	Asphalt
- Sources: CAAN and DAFIF

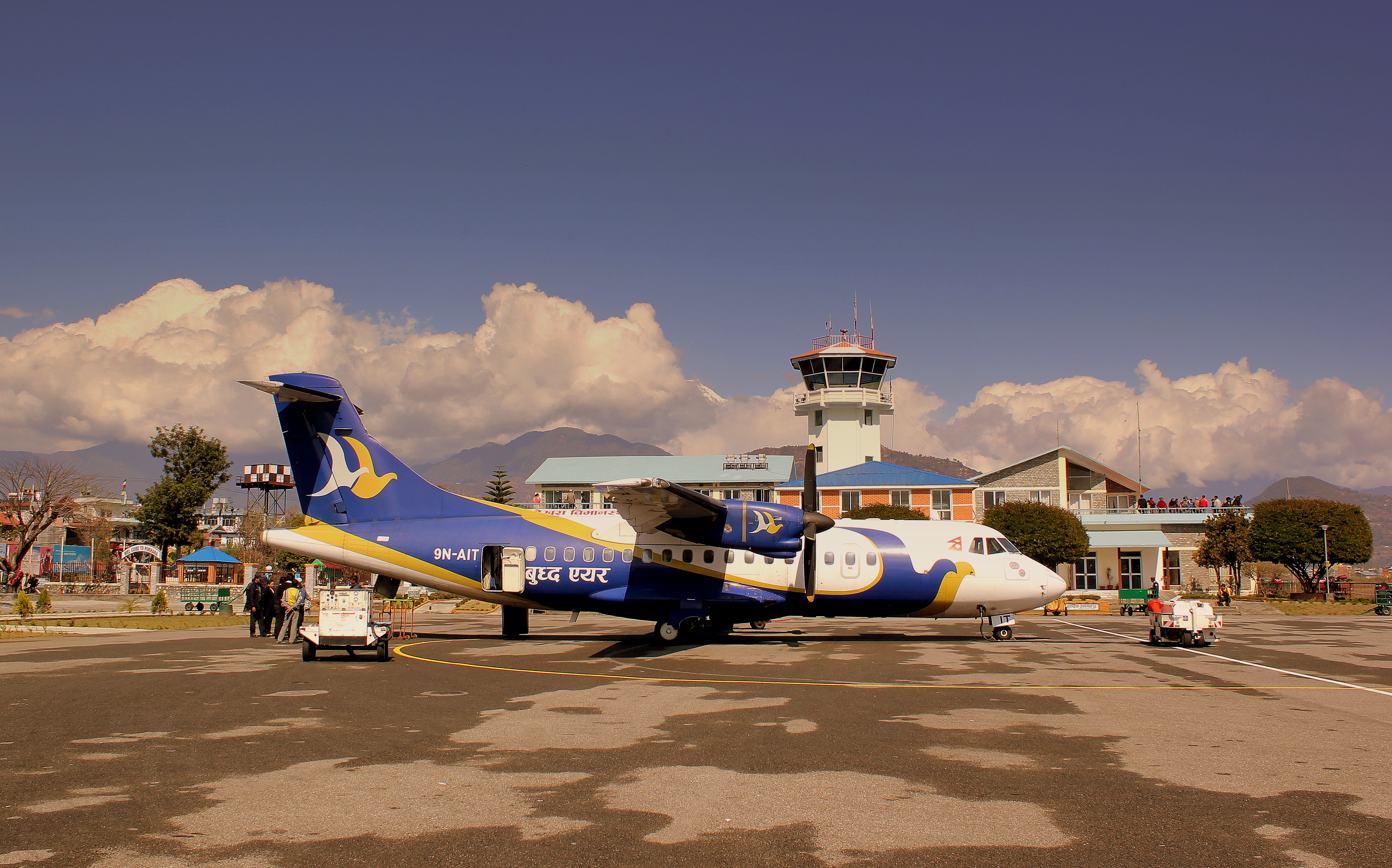
A Buddha Air ATR 42 in front of the airport's terminal

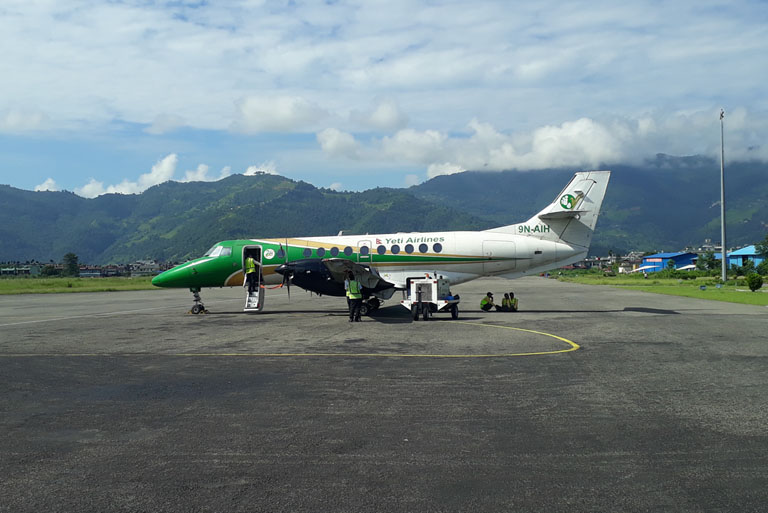
A Yeti Airlines Jetstream 41 at Pokhara Airport in 2019

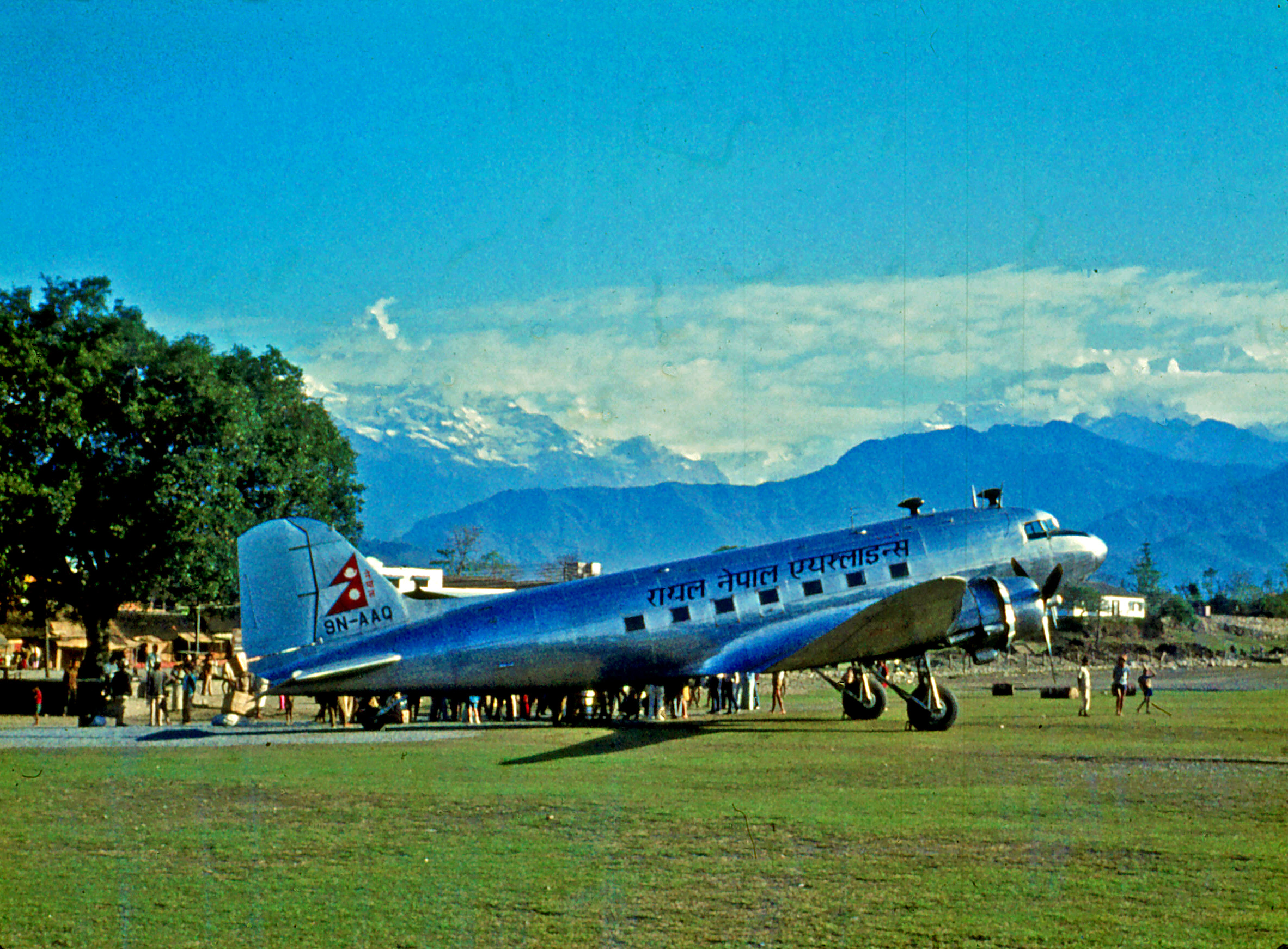
A Nepal Airlines DC-3 at Pokhara Airport in 1971

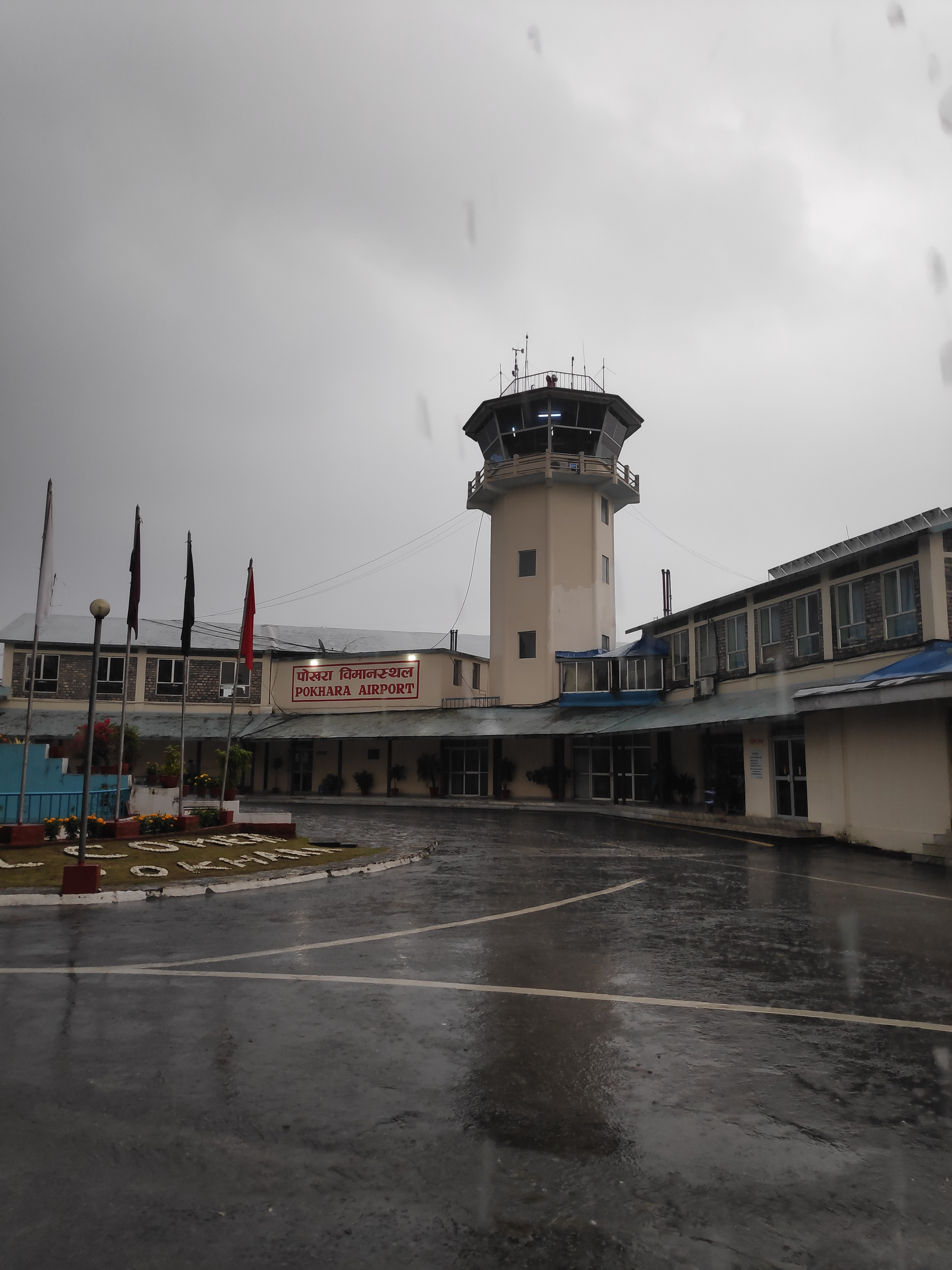
Airside at Pokhara Airport

Pokhara Airport (Nepali: पोखरा विमानस्थल, (IATA: PKR, ICAO: VNPK)) (in official use by CAAN "Pokhara (VNPK)") is a domestic airport serving Pokhara in Nepal. Pokhara Airport is supposed to be gradually replaced by Nepal's third international airport, Pokhara International Airport, since 2023. While most operations were transferred to the new airport on 1 January 2023, the domestic operations to Jomsom, Helicopter services, Mountain and rescue flights are still operated from this airport in 2025.

== History ==
The airport was established on 4 July 1958 by the Civil Aviation Authority of Nepal. Until the 2010s, it offered regular connections to Kathmandu and Jomsom; and seasonal connections to Manang. In 2011 Buddha Air, a private Nepali airline, began international flights from Pokhara to Chaudhary Charan Singh International Airport in Lucknow, India, and announced plans to fly to New Delhi's Indira Gandhi International Airport in the future. However these international flights were discontinued soon after.

In the late 2010s, Pokhara Airport became Nepal's second domestic hub for air travel.

== Facilities ==
The apron of the airport is relatively small and can only handle eight propeller planes at a time. Pokhara Airport is a diversion airport for the country's main airport in Kathmandu in times of problems such as fog. Due to a short runway and crowded apron, flights must often be re-diverted to third airports with even shorter runways.

== Airlines and destinations ==
Airlines	Destinations
Sita Air	Jomsom
Summit Air	Charter: Jomsom
Tara Air	Jomsom

Several Ultralight aviation companies offer recreational and sightseeing flights from Pokhara Airport.

== Incidents and accidents ==
- On 6 November 1997, a Necon Air Avro 748-100 had a hydraulic failure after landing from a flight from Kathmandu Airport. The pilot attempted to steer the plane, but it hit a stationary Hawker Siddeley HS 748. There were no fatalities among the four crew members and 44 passengers.
- On 22 August 2002, a Shangri-La Air Twin Otter aircraft, on a flight from Jomsom to Pokhara, crashed into a hill that was under complete cloud cover following three days of continuous rain. All three crew and 15 passengers were killed.
- On 16 February 2014, Nepal Airlines Flight 183 crashed shortly after taking off for a flight from Pokhara to Jumla Airport. The crash in bad weather killed all the 18 on board.
- On 15 January 2023, Yeti Airlines Flight 691 crashed in the vicinity of the airfield in Gharipatan, Pokhara, while on approach to Pokhara International Airport from Kathmandu Airport. There were no survivors.

== See also ==
- Pokhara International Airport
- List of airports in Nepal
