= Jomsom =

Town in Mustang, Nepal

Jomsom जोमसोम
- HQ/Ward
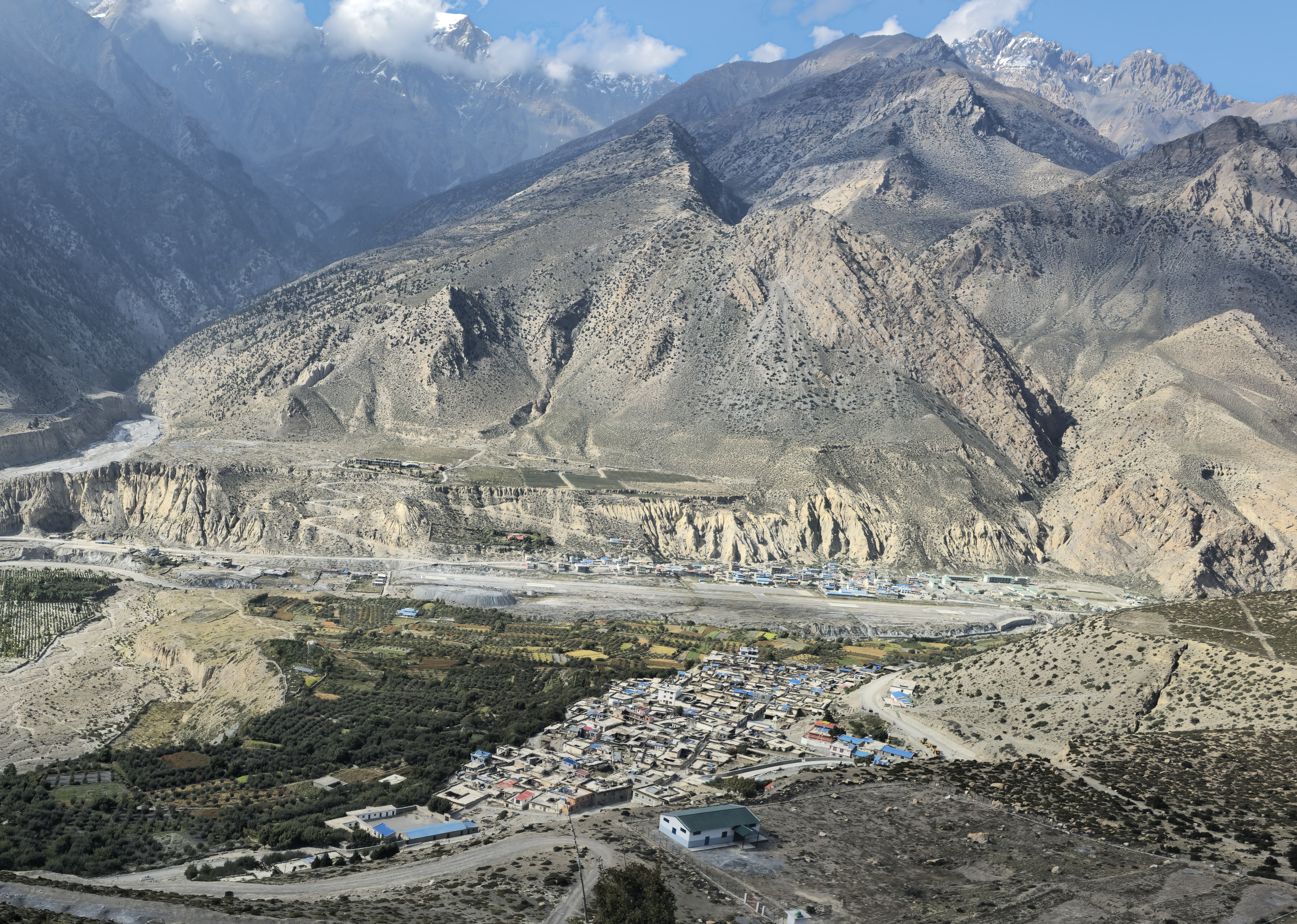
- Aerial view of Jomsom

- Location in Gandaki Province Jomsom (Nepal)
- Coordinates: 28°47′0″N 83°43′50″E
- Country: Nepal
- Province: Gandaki Province
- District: Mustang
- Rural council: Gharpajhong
- Ward No.: 4
- Elevation: 2,743 m (8,999 ft)

Population (2011)
  - Total: 1,370
- Time zone: UTC+5:45 (NST)
- Postal code: 33100
- Area code: 069

Jomsom (Nepali: जोमसोम), (Ward No. 4 of Gharpajhong Rural Municipality) also known as Dzongsam (New Fort), is the centre of Gharapjhong rural municipality in Mustang district and a former independent village development committee situated at an altitude of about 2,700 metres (8,900 ft) in Gandaki Province of western Nepal. The soaring peaks of Dhaulagiri and Nilgiri form a backdrop to the town straddling the Kali Gandaki River, which flows right through the centre of Jomsom. Along the banks of the Kali Gandaki, black fossilised stones called shaligram, considered as an iconic symbol and reminder of the god Vishnu in the Hindu culture, can be found. Such stones are believed to be found only in the Kali Gandaki, and are considered holy by Hindus.

As the district headquarters, Jomsom is primarily an administrative and commercial centre with government officials and merchants rubbing shoulders with the local residents of the region, known as Thakalis. The town is also the main hub for onward travel to Upper Mustang and Muktinath. A company of the Nepalese Army is stationed here. Regular flights to Pokhara are operated from Jomsom Airport, which is also capable of handling aircraft from the Nepalese Army Air Service.

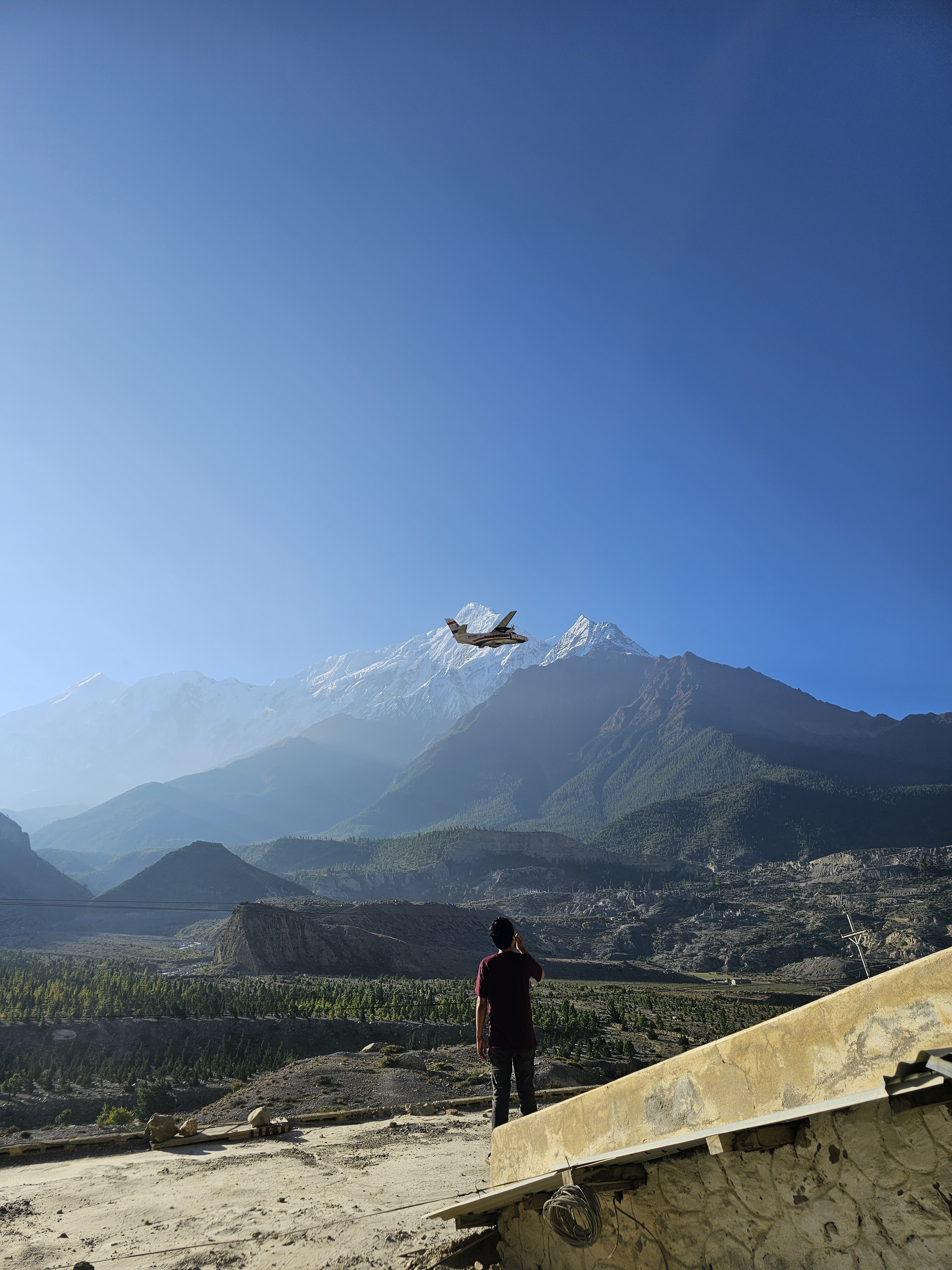
A plane flying from Jomsom Airport towards the mountain.

== Geography ==
Jomsom lies to the north of Pokhara in Mustang district, and is the main gateway to Upper Mustang. It lies to south of the village of Kagbeni, a Tibetan-influenced village filled with prayer wheels, chortens and a Buddhist monastery. The trail passing through Jomsom follows the Kali Gandaki River which forms the deepest ravine in the world; on one side lies the Annapurna mountain range and on the other side is Dhaulagiri. The river freezes during winter and flows with rainwater and melting snow in summer and monsoon.

With its diverse landscape, the area around Jomsom has the scenery of rocky cliffs and high peaks of the Himalayas without much presence of greenery, with the exception being forests of bright rhododendrons. The culture in Jomsom is a rich combination of Hinduism and Tibetan Buddhism.

The layout of the town and the design of the houses are unique to this area. The houses in Jomsom are designed to protect the inhabitants from the strong winds that blow up the valley every day from late morning onwards. These winds are caused by differences in atmospheric pressure between the Tibetan plateau and the lower reaches of the valley. The best example of the unique architecture of this region is found in the village of Marpha which is a two-hour walk down from Jomsom, where one can find stone-flagged streets with an efficient underground drainage system and flat-roofed houses with a central courtyard, which best showcase the architecture of this area. The strong winds that blow up the valley prevent flights from taking off from Jomsom after 11am.

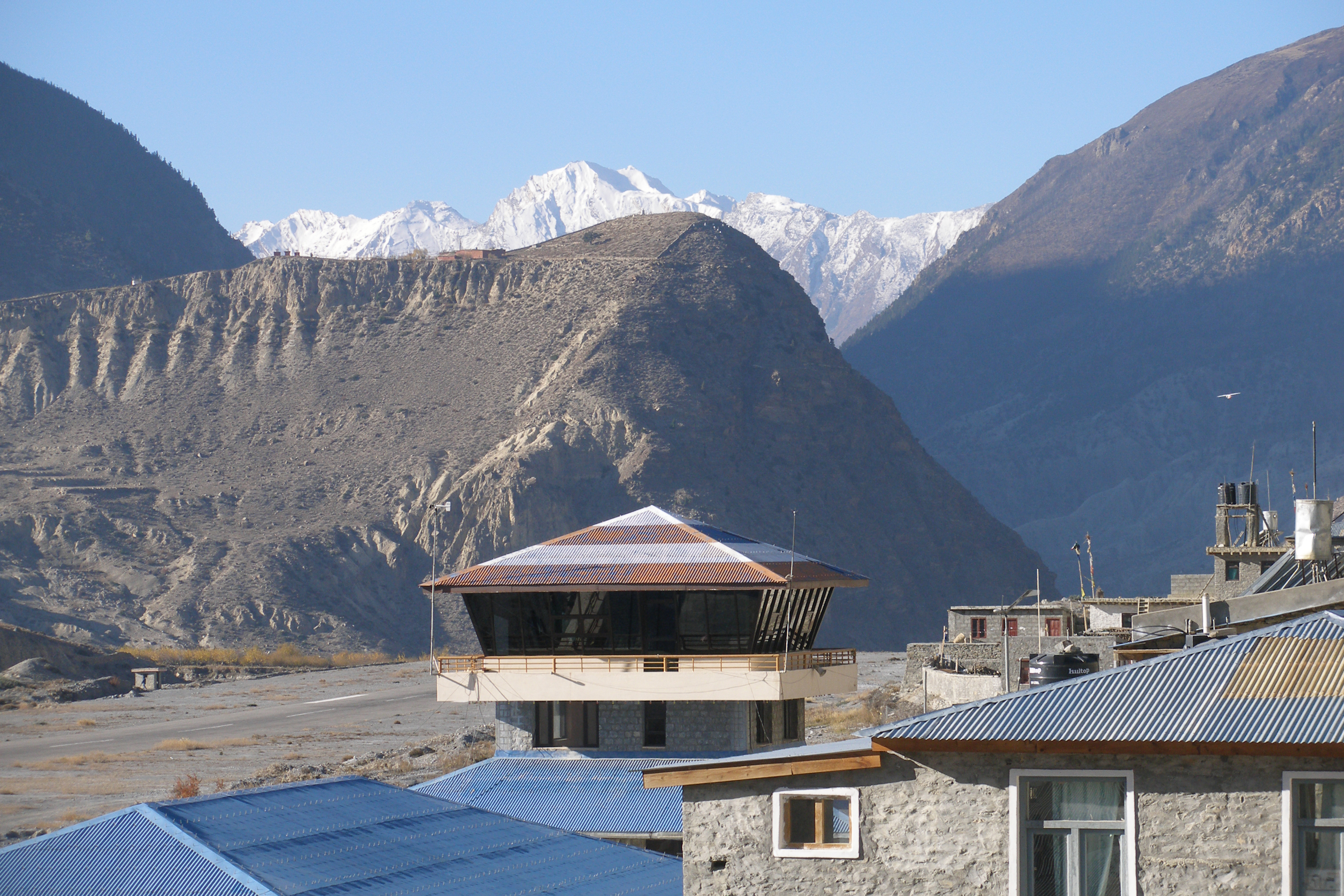
Jomsom Airport

=== Climate ===
Jomsom has a cold semi-arid climate (Köppen BSk).

Climate data for Jomsom, elevation 2,741 m (8,993 ft), (1991–2020 normals, extremes 1960–1971,1980–2020)
Month	Jan	Feb	Mar	Apr	May	Jun	Jul	Aug	Sep	Oct	Nov	Dec	Year
Record high °C (°F)	23.2 (73.8)	23.3 (73.9)	27.0 (80.6)	28.2 (82.8)	31.2 (88.2)	29.7 (85.5)	28.9 (84.0)	30.5 (86.9)	28.8 (83.8)	26.8 (80.2)	23.6 (74.5)	23.5 (74.3)	31.2 (88.2)
Mean daily maximum °C (°F)	10.4 (50.7)	11.8 (53.2)	15.2 (59.4)	18.6 (65.5)	20.6 (69.1)	22.6 (72.7)	22.8 (73.0)	22.6 (72.7)	21.3 (70.3)	18.0 (64.4)	14.8 (58.6)	12.3 (54.1)	17.6 (63.7)
Daily mean °C (°F)	4.3 (39.7)	5.6 (42.1)	8.6 (47.5)	11.5 (52.7)	14.2 (57.6)	17.4 (63.3)	18.5 (65.3)	18.2 (64.8)	16.4 (61.5)	11.8 (53.2)	8.2 (46.8)	5.6 (42.1)	11.7 (53.1)
Mean daily minimum °C (°F)	−1.9 (28.6)	−0.6 (30.9)	2.0 (35.6)	4.4 (39.9)	7.8 (46.0)	12.1 (53.8)	14.1 (57.4)	13.8 (56.8)	11.5 (52.7)	5.5 (41.9)	1.5 (34.7)	−1.2 (29.8)	5.8 (42.4)
Record low °C (°F)	−11.6 (11.1)	−11.6 (11.1)	−5.4 (22.3)	−4.1 (24.6)	−0.4 (31.3)	4.9 (40.8)	9.2 (48.6)	8.5 (47.3)	4.0 (39.2)	−1.8 (28.8)	−5.2 (22.6)	−10.0 (14.0)	−11.6 (11.1)
Average precipitation mm (inches)	14.4 (0.57)	21.2 (0.83)	30.4 (1.20)	21.4 (0.84)	18.6 (0.73)	31.8 (1.25)	46.8 (1.84)	43.9 (1.73)	36.0 (1.42)	18.2 (0.72)	4.6 (0.18)	5.1 (0.20)	292.4 (11.51)
Source: Department of Hydrology and Meteorology

== Jomsom trek ==
Jomsom is the starting point of trekking routes in Upper Mustang and Manang. The diverse landscape and culture found along this trekking route give insight into the way of life of Nepali people of various ethnic groups. The highlight is a trek through the deepest gorge in the world carved by the Kali Gandaki River, which originates in the Tibetan plateau to eventually flow into the Ganges in the country of India.

Not too far from Jomsom is Muktinath, the famous pilgrimage site for Buddhists as well as Hindus. To Hindus, Muktinath is a sacred place of salvation. They believe that bathing in the waters here guarantees salvation after death. The Hindu god, Brahma, is said to have lit the eternal flames that burn at Muktinath. To Buddhists, Muktinath is a place where the great sage Guru Rinpoche (Padmasambhava) who brought Buddhism to Tibet, came to meditate. The area around Jomsom is a perfect place to find fossilised ammonites, known locally as Shaligram, which are found all along the upper reaches of the Kali Gandaki.

Most of the route along the Jomsom trek forms part of the Annapurna circuit and Annapurna foothill treks. The usual starting point is Naya Pul on the Pokhara to Baglung road and from there, via Ghorepani and Tatopani, into the gorge of the Kali Gandaki. The deep valleys and high mountains encircling the giant Annapurna Himal embrace a wide range of peoples and terrain, from sub-tropical jungle to a high, dry landscape resembling the Tibetan Plateau.

== Media ==
A modern FM radio broadcasting station was built in Jomsom in September, 2013. It is equipped with one radio studio, one main control room and the transmission tower along with a community centre and camping site for Annapurna trekkers. The station was built, following a contribution from a major Korean broadcaster, MBC, Lafuma and KOICA, for the wellbeing and safety of both residents and trekkers of Mustang.

== 2015 earthquake ==
The town was only slightly affected by the major earthquake of 25 April 2015. However, around 15–20 buildings along the river bank were damaged by a slowly progressing landslide after the earthquake. No injuries were reported in the town.

== See also ==
- Upper Mustang
