= 2019 Kaski–2 by-election =

2019 Kaski 2 by-election
← 2017	30 November 2019	2022 →

Kaski 2
- Turnout: 63.37%
Candidate	Bidya Bhattarai	Khem Raj Paudel
Party	Nepal Communist Party (NCP)	Nepali Congress
Popular vote	24,394	15,991
Percentage	54.27%	35.58%
MP before election
Rabindra Prasad Adhikari (deceased)
Nepal Communist Party
Elected MP
Bidya Bhattarai
Nepal Communist Party

A by-election was held in Kaski 2 constituency of Nepal on 30 November 2019, following the death of incumbent Rabindra Prasad Adhikari in a helicopter crash. Adhikari was a 3-term Member of Parliament from Kaski. He was the Minister of Culture, Tourism and Civil Aviation at the time of his death. The by-election was won by Bidya Bhattarai, his widow, with 54.27% of the vote. She defeated her nearest rival, Khem Raj Paudel of Nepali Congress, by 8,403 votes.

== Candidates ==
A total of 21 candidates took part in the election. Nepal Communist Party (NCP) selected Bidya Bhattarai, widow of Rabindra Prasad Adhikari, as their candidate. Her primary opponent was Khem Raj Paudel of Nepali Congress.

== Result ==
2019 Kaski–2 by-election
Candidate	Party	Votes	%	+/–
Bidya Bhattarai	Nepal Communist Party	24,394	54.27	–0.95
Khem Raj Paudel	Nepali Congress	15,991	35.58	–2.28
Dharma Raj Gurung	Samajbadi Party	1,922	4.28	+2.97
Rom Bahadur Bhandari	Rastriya Prajatantra Party	1,153	2.57	New
Rajani K.C.	Sajha Party	942	2.10	New
Other candidates		544	1.21	–
Total		44,946	100.00	–
Valid votes		44,946	98.68	
Invalid/blank votes		600	1.32	
Total votes		45,546	100.00	
Registered voters/turnout		71,871	63.37	–7.20
Majority		8,403	18.45	+1.33
Nepal Communist Party hold		Swing		+0.67

== See also ==
- 2023 Nepalese by-election
