= Kaski 2 =

Parliamentary constituency in Nepal

- Parliamentary constituency for the House of Representatives
- Kaski 2 in Gandaki Province

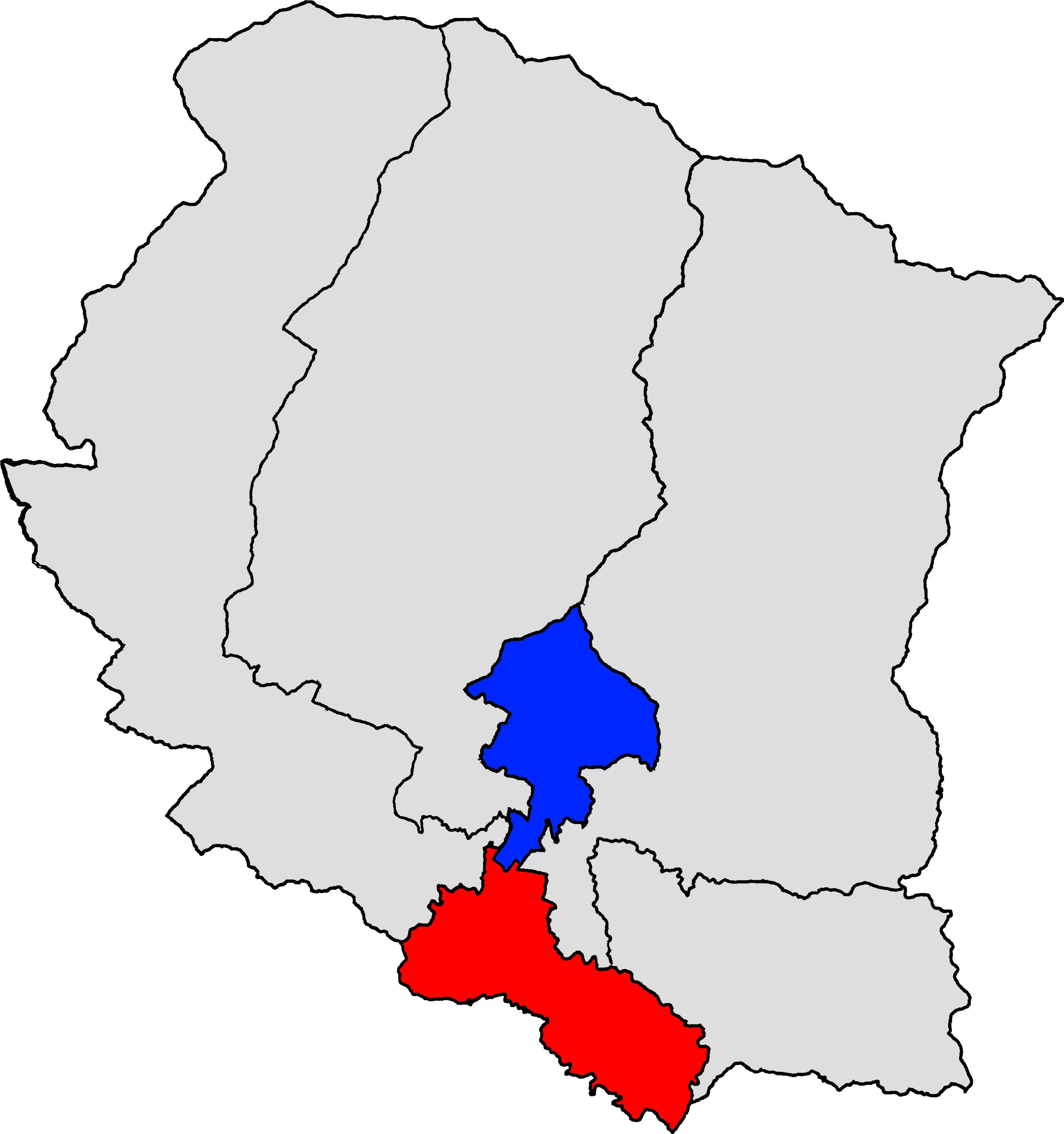
- Assembly segments Kaski 2(A) and Kaski 2(B) within Kaski District
- Province: Gandaki Province
- District: Kaski District
- Electorate: 70,651

Current constituency
- Created: 1991
- MP: Uttam Prasad Paudel (RSP)
- Gandaki MPA 2(A): Krishna Bahadur Thapa (NCP)
- Gandaki MPA 2(B): Bindu Kumar Thapa (NC)

Kaski 2 is one of three parliamentary constituencies of Kaski District in Nepal. This constituency came into existence on the Constituency Delimitation Commission (CDC) report submitted on 31 August 2017.

== Incorporated areas ==
Kaski 2 incorporates wards 4, 7, 8, 9, 11, 15, 16, 17, 20, 21 and 33 of Pokhara Metropolitan City.

== Assembly segments ==
It encompasses the following Gandaki Provincial Assembly segment

- Kaski 2(A)
- Kaski 2(B)

== Members of Parliament ==
=== Parliament/Constituent Assembly ===
Election	Member	Party
1991	Tul Bahadur Gurung	CPN (Unified Marxist–Leninist)
1999	Mahadev Gurung	Nepali Congress
2008	Raj Kaji Gurung	CPN (Maoist)
January 2009	Raj Kaji Gurung	UCPN (Maoist)
2013	Sharada Devi Paudel	Nepali Congress
2017	Rabindra Prasad Adhikari	CPN (Unified Marxist–Leninist)
May 2018	Rabindra Prasad Adhikari	Nepal Communist Party
2019 by-election	Bidya Bhattarai	Nepal Communist Party
March 2021	Bidya Bhattarai	CPN (Unified Marxist–Leninist)

=== Provincial Assembly ===
==== 2(A) ====
Election	Member	Party
2017	Krishna Bahadur Thapa	CPN (Unified Marxist-Leninist)
May 2018	Krishna Bahadur Thapa	Nepal Communist Party

==== 2(B) ====
Election	Member	Party
2017	Bindu Kumar Thapa	Nepali Congress

== Election results ==
=== Election in the 2020s ===
==== 2022 general election ====
Candidate	Party	Votes	%
Bidhya Bhattarai	CPN (UML)	16,998	36.05
Madhav Prasad Kandel	Rastriya Swatantra Party	12,495	26.50
Shreenath Baral	CPN (Unified Socialist)	9,659	20.48
Subarna Raj Pant	Rastriya Prajatantra Party	3,993	8.47
Mahadev Gurung	Independent	1,340	2.84
Others		2,671	5.66
Total		47,156	100.00
Majority		4,503	
CPN (UML) hold			

==== 2022 provincial election ====
===== 2(A) =====
Candidate	Party	Votes	%
Bhim Bahadur Karki	CPN (UML)	10,531	41.79
Bijay Bahadur Bhandari	Rastriya Prajatantra Party	5,893	23.38
Biswo Prakash Lamichhane	CPN (Maoist Centre)	5,540	21.98
Chet Bahadur Mahat	Hamro Nepali Party	2,592	10.29
Others	644	2.56	
Total		25,200	100.00
Majority		4,638	
CPN (UML)			

===== 2(B) =====
Candidate	Party	Votes	%
Bindu Kumar Thapa	Nepali Congress	9,280	41.25
Mina Gurung	CPN (UML)	7,971	35.43
Arun Giri	Rastriya Prajatantra Party	3,903	17.35
Others	1,342	5.97	
Total		22,496	100.00
Majority		1,309	
Nepali Congress			

=== Election in the 2010s ===
==== 2019 by-elections ====
Party	Candidate	Votes
Nepal Communist Party	Bidya Bhattarai	24,394
Nepali Congress	Khem Raj Paudel	15,991
Samajbadi Party, Nepal	Dharma Raj Gurung	1,922
Rastriya Prajatantra Party	Rom Bahadur Bhandari	1,153
Others		1,486
Invalid votes		600
Result	NCP hold	
Source: Election Commission

==== 2017 legislative elections ====
Party	Candidate	Votes
CPN (Unified Marxist–Leninist)	Rabindra Prasad Adhikari	27,207
Nepali Congress	Dev Raj Chalise	18,661
Others		2,581
Invalid votes		1,464
Result	CPN (UML) gain	
Source: Election Commission

==== 2017 Nepalese provincial elections ====
===== 2(A) =====
Party	Candidate	Votes
CPN (Unified Marxist–Leninist)	Krishna Bahadur Thapa	15,329
Nepali Congress	Guru Prasad Baral	8,325
Others		2,174
Invalid votes		605
Result	CPN (UML) gain	
Source: Election Commission

===== 2(B) =====
Party	Candidate	Votes
Nepali Congress	Bindu Kumar Thapa	10,726
CPN (Maoist Centre)	Raj Kaji Gurung	9,924
Independent	Naresh Shankar Palikhe	1,292
Others		1,130
Invalid votes		448
Result	Congress gain	
Source: Election Commission

==== 2013 Constituent Assembly election ====
Party	Candidate	Votes
Nepali Congress	Sharada Devi Paudel	11,662
CPN (Unified Marxist–Leninist)	Krishna Bahadur Thapa	11,318
UCPN (Maoist)	Bakhan Singh Gurung	5,606
Federal Socialist Party, Nepal	Devi Raj Gurung	2,595
Rastriya Prajatantra Party Nepal	Jaya Lal Pun	1,401
Akhanda Nepal Party	Padam Bahadur Karki	1,241
Others		1,608
Result	Congress gain	
Source: NepalNews

=== Election in the 2000s ===
==== 2008 Constituent Assembly election ====
Party	Candidate	Votes
CPN (Maoist)	Raj Kaji Gurung	14,832
Nepali Congress	Sharada Devi Paudel	10,743
CPN (Unified Marxist–Leninist)	Gaja Kumari Gurung	10,637
Rastriya Prajatantra Party	Kamal Man Gurung	1,374
Others		2,211
Invalid votes		1,527
Result	Maoist gain	
Source: Election Commission

=== Election in the 1990s ===
==== 1999 legislative elections ====
Party	Candidate	Votes
Nepali Congress	Mahadev Gurung	26,443
CPN (Unified Marxist–Leninist)	Tul Bahadur Gurung	22,126
CPN (Marxist–Leninist)	Harka Bahadur Pun	2,960
Rastriya Prajatantra Party	Rom Bahadur Bhandari	2,691
Others		775
Invalid Votes		1,426
Result	Congress gain	
Source: Election Commission

==== 1994 legislative elections ====
Party	Candidate	Votes
CPN (Unified Marxist–Leninist)	Tul Bahadur Gurung	22,377
Nepali Congress	Shukra Raj Sharma	18,663
Rastriya Prajatantra Party	Surya Bahadur K.C.	8,568
Others		745
Result	CPN (UML) hold	
Source: Election Commission

==== 1991 legislative elections ====
Party	Candidate	Votes
CPN (Unified Marxist–Leninist)	Tul Bahadur Gurung	24,034
Nepali Congress		21,311
Result	CPN (UML) gain	

== See also ==
- List of parliamentary constituencies of Nepal
