= Himalaya Airlines =

Airline based in Kathmandu, Nepal

IATA	ICAO	Call sign
H9	HIM	HIMALAYA
- Founded: 19 August 2014; 12 years ago
- Commenced operations: 31 May 2016; 10 years ago
- AOC #: 084/2015
- Hubs: Tribhuvan International Airport (Kathmandu)
- Fleet size: 4
- Destinations: 17
- Headquarters: Gairidhara, Kathmandu, Nepal
- Key people: Zhou Enyong (President); Vijay Shrestha (Vice president)
- Website: www.himalaya-airlines.com

Himalaya Airlines (Nepali: हिमालय एअरलाइन्स) is a Nepalese airline operating from Tribhuvan International Airport in Kathmandu, Nepal. Himalaya Airlines was founded in 2014 as a joint venture between Yeti World Investment Group and Tibet Airlines. Himalaya Airlines launched operations in May 2016 with a single Airbus A320. The airline currently flies to eight destinations. It is currently banned from flying in EU airspace.

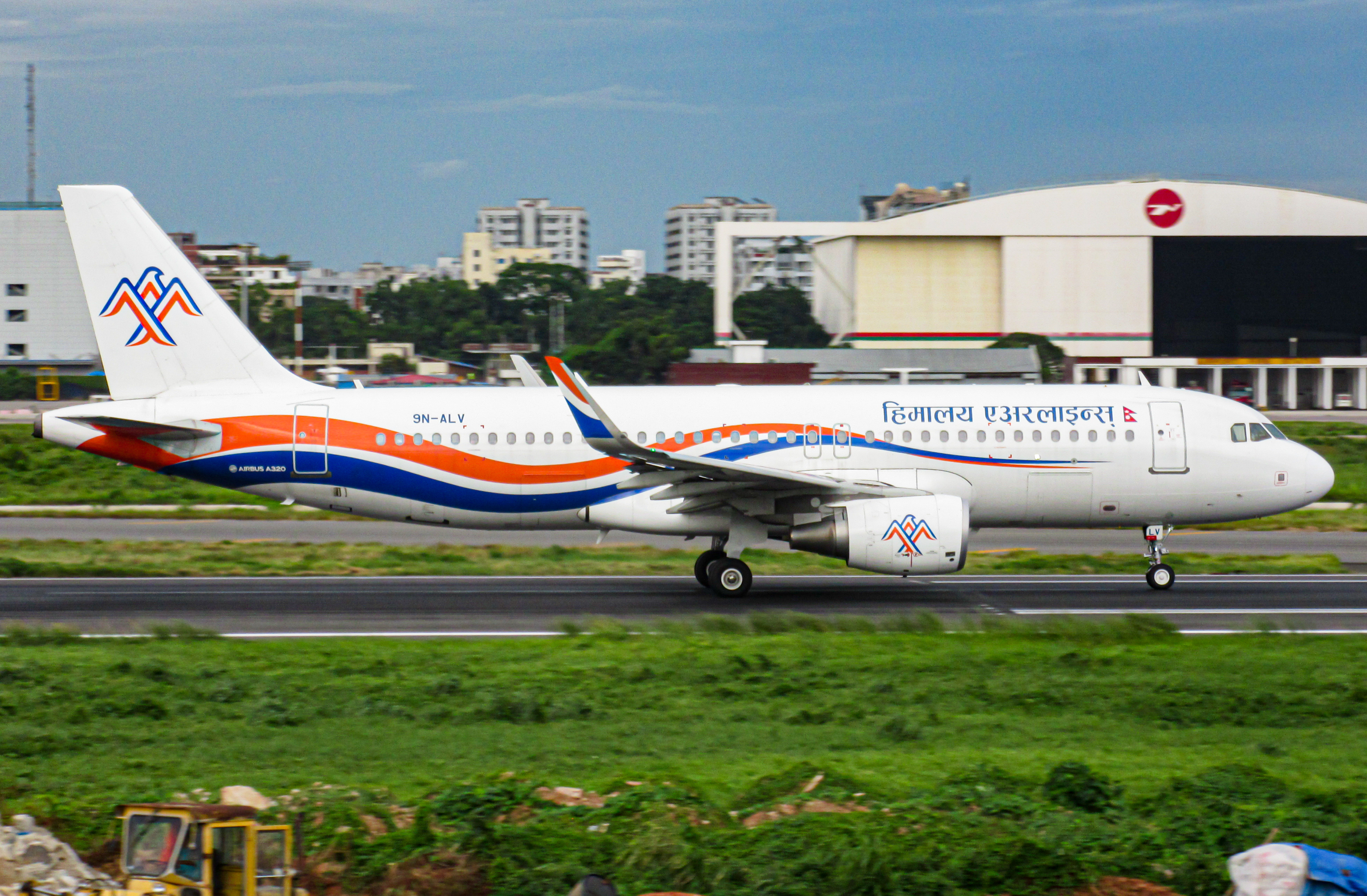
A Himalaya Airlines Airbus A320 wearing the new livery taxing at Dhaka Airport.

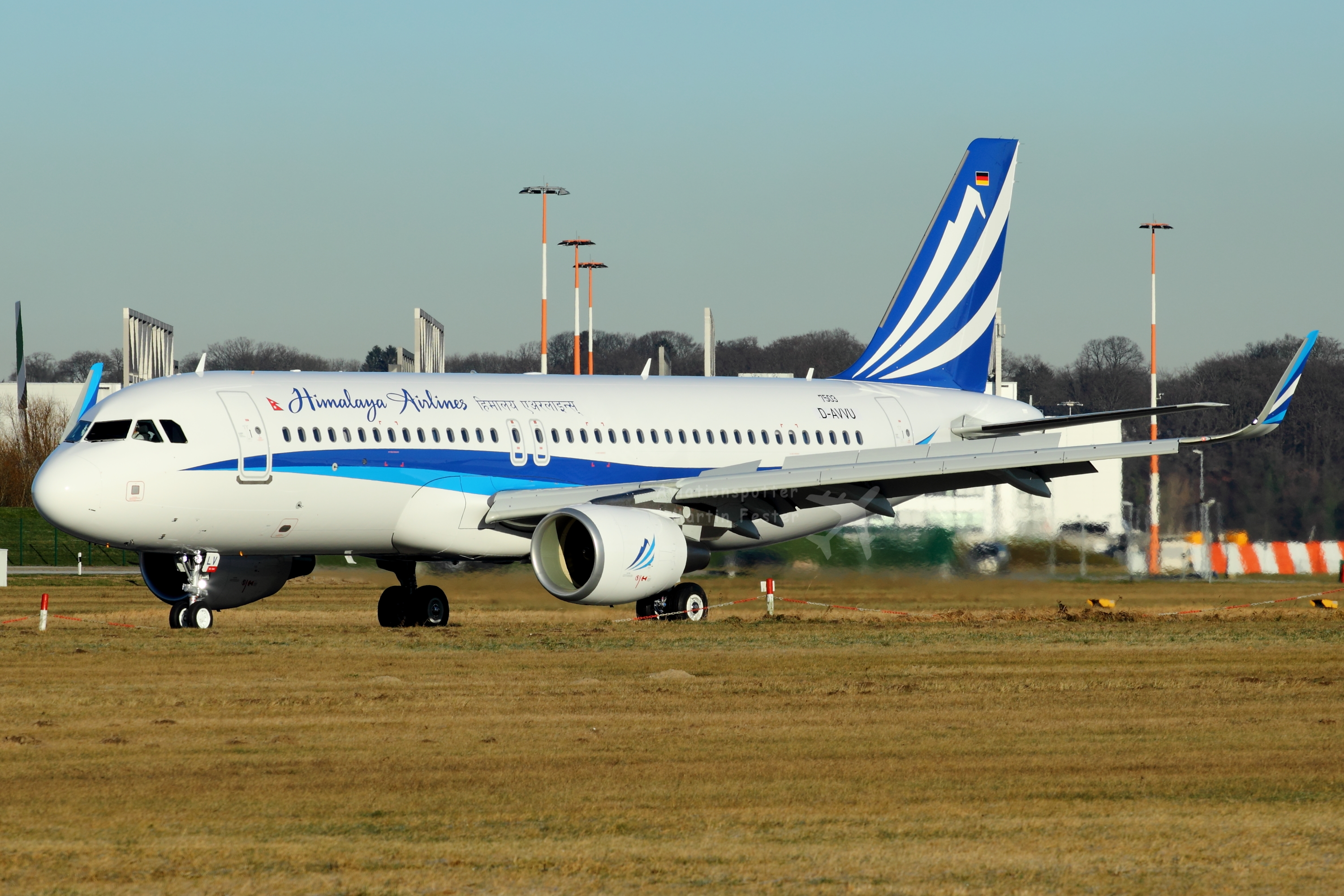
A Himalaya Airlines Airbus A320 wearing the old livery taxing at Finkenwerder Airport in Germany

== History ==
Himalaya Airlines is the second attempt of Yeti Airlines Group to launch an international airline based in Nepal, following the collapse of Fly Yeti in 2008. It is also the second Sino-Nepali airline company after Flying Dragon Airlines. Alongside Yeti Airlines, which managed the airline through Yeti World Investment, Tibet Airlines and the Himalaya Infrastructure Fund Aviation Investment Company had stakes in the airline.

In order to obtain its air operator's certificate, Himalaya Airlines leased a Jetstream 41 aircraft from Yeti Airlines and conducted its first proving flights in February 2015. Launch plans were delayed by the April 2015 Nepal earthquake. The airline inducted its first aircraft, an Airbus A320, on 9 March 2016, and launched operations on 31 May 2016, with flights between Kathmandu and Doha. Flights from Kathmandu to Colombo started in October 2016, marking the resumption of scheduled flights between Nepal and Sri Lanka after 28 years but the flights were soon suspended.

In 2016, Himalaya Airlines served as the governmental aircraft of Nepal, when Prime Minister Khadga Prasad Oli used Himalaya's services on his inaugural visit to China.

The airline initially focused on unconventional routes; such as Yangon, Myanmar, Colombo, and Sri Lanka as opposed to highly demanded middle-eastern destinations, but they quickly ceased operation. After this, Himalaya started operating to Dammam, Saudi Arabia as well as Abu Dhabi and Dubai in the United Arab Emirates. In the months leading to Nepal Tourism Board's Visit Nepal 2020 tourism promotion campaign, Himalaya Airlines focused on the market in China, as Chinese were ranked second among the most number of travellers that visit to Nepal. In October 2019, Himalaya Airlines launched direct service to Beijing's newly constructed Daxing International Airport making it the only airline in Nepal to connect the capitals of Nepal and China.

Despite focusing on the Chinese Market, Himalaya Airlines discontinued all flights to China in February 2020 due to the first outbreak of the coronavirus. During the COVID-19 pandemic in Nepal, Himalaya Airlines carried out rescue and evacuation charter flights while all of its scheduled flights were grounded from March 2020.

== Corporate affairs ==
At the time of its establishment, Tibet Airlines held a 49% stake in Himalaya Airlines, while Yeti World Investment, an affiliate of Yeti Airlines Group owned the remaining 51%. Zhao Guo Qiang was the airline's first president while Ang Tshering Sherpa served as chairman of the board until his death in 2019.

In September 2019, Himalaya Airlines underwent ownership restructuring, for which the shares of Tibet Airlines were transferred to Tibet Civil Aviation Development and Investment. Subsequently, the logo and livery were changed. The blue, dark blue as well as white blend of livery and logo was changed with orange and blue combination. Though, the fuselage retained its white color. Currently, Zhou Enyong serves as the president of Himalaya Airlines.

The airline is headquartered in Gairidhara, Kathmandu.

== Destinations ==
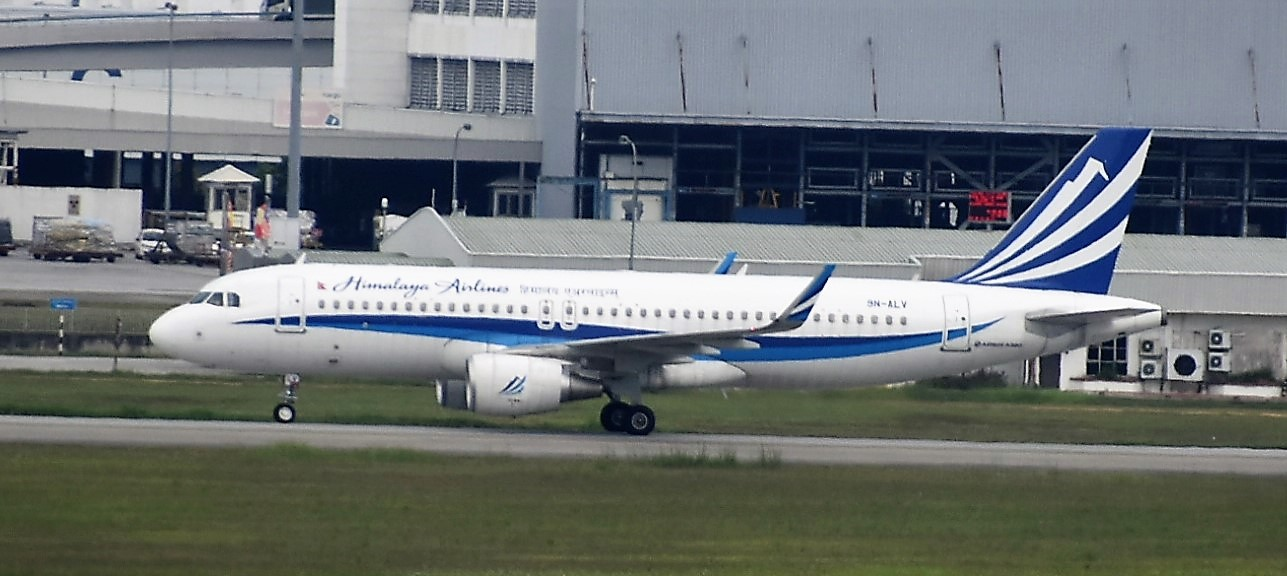
Airbus A320 of Himalaya Airlines at Kuala Lumpur International Airport

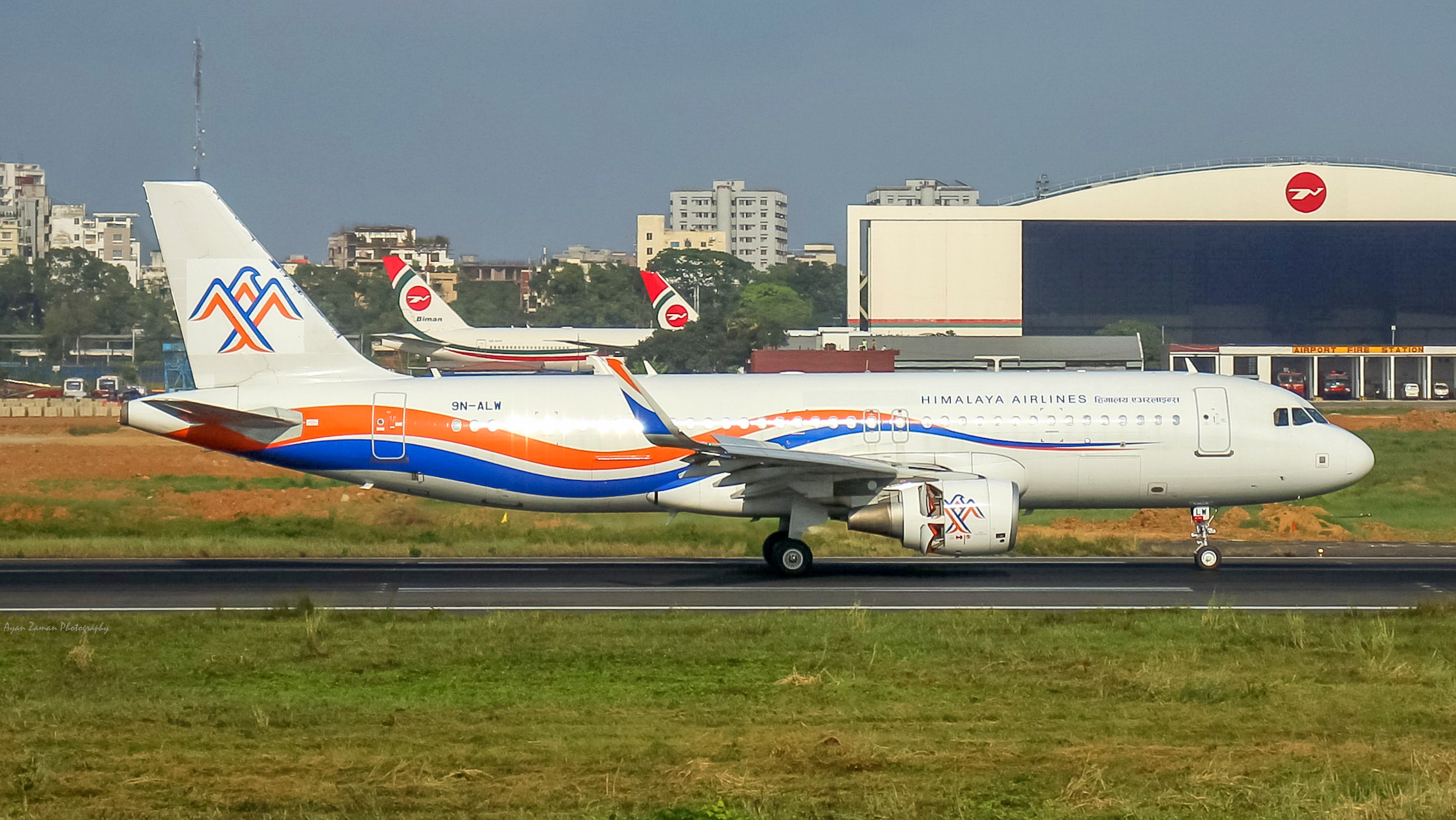
Himalaya Airlines Airbus A320 at Shahjalal International Airport, Dhaka

Himalaya Airlines serves the following destinations as of November 2023:

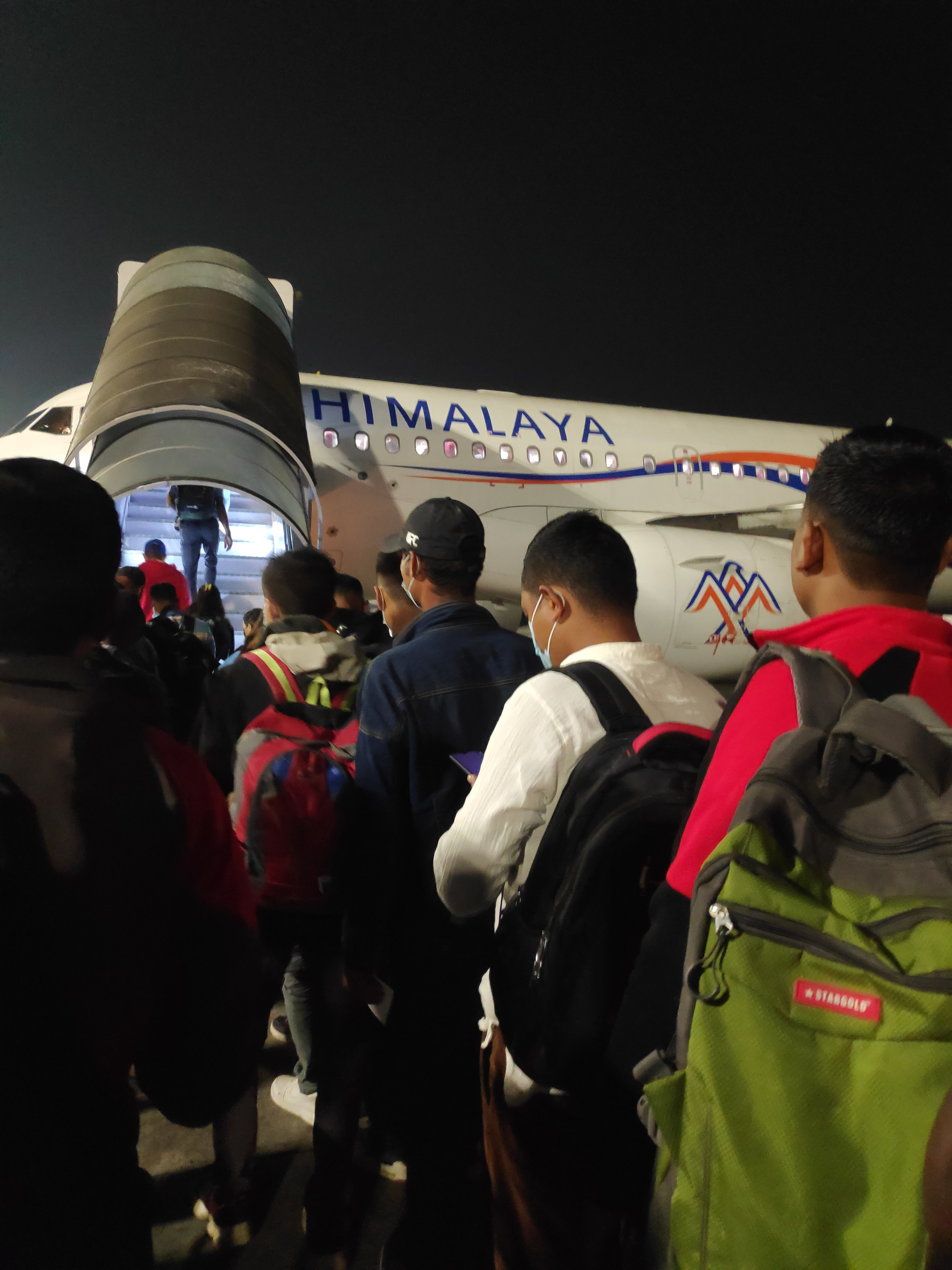
Passengers about to board Himalaya Airlines Airbus.

Country	City	Airport	Notes	Refs
Bangladesh	Chittagong	Shah Amanat International Airport	Terminated	
Bangladesh	Dhaka	Shahjalal International Airport		
China	Beijing	Beijing Daxing International Airport	Terminated	
China	Changsha	Changsha Huanghua International Airport	Terminated	
China	Chongqing	Chongqing Jiangbei International Airport	Terminated	
China	Guiyang	Guiyang Longdongbao International Airport	Terminated	
China	Kunming	Kunming Changshui International Airport	Terminated	
China	Lhasa	Lhasa Gonggar Airport		
China	Nanning	Nanning Wuxu International Airport ^{Cargo}	Terminated	
China	Shanghai	Shanghai Pudong International Airport	Terminated	
China	Shenzhen	Shenzhen Bao'an International Airport	Terminated	
Kuwait	Kuwait City	Kuwait International Airport		
Malaysia	Kuala Lumpur	Kuala Lumpur International Airport		
Myanmar	Yangon	Yangon International Airport	Terminated	
Nepal	Kathmandu	Tribhuvan International Airport	Hub	
Nepal	Pokhara	Pokhara International Airport	Terminated	
Nepal	Siddharthanagar	Gautam Buddha International Airport	Terminated	
Qatar	Doha	Doha International Airport ^{Special Charter}	Airport closed	
Qatar	Doha	Hamad International Airport		
Saudi Arabia	Dammam	King Fahd International Airport		
Saudi Arabia	Riyadh	King Khalid International Airport		
Sri Lanka	Colombo	Bandaranaike International Airport	Terminated	
United Arab Emirates	Abu Dhabi	Zayed International Airport	Terminated	
United Arab Emirates	Dubai	Al Maktoum International Airport	Terminated	
United Arab Emirates	Dubai	Dubai International Airport		

=== Interline agreements ===
- Hahn Air

== Fleet ==
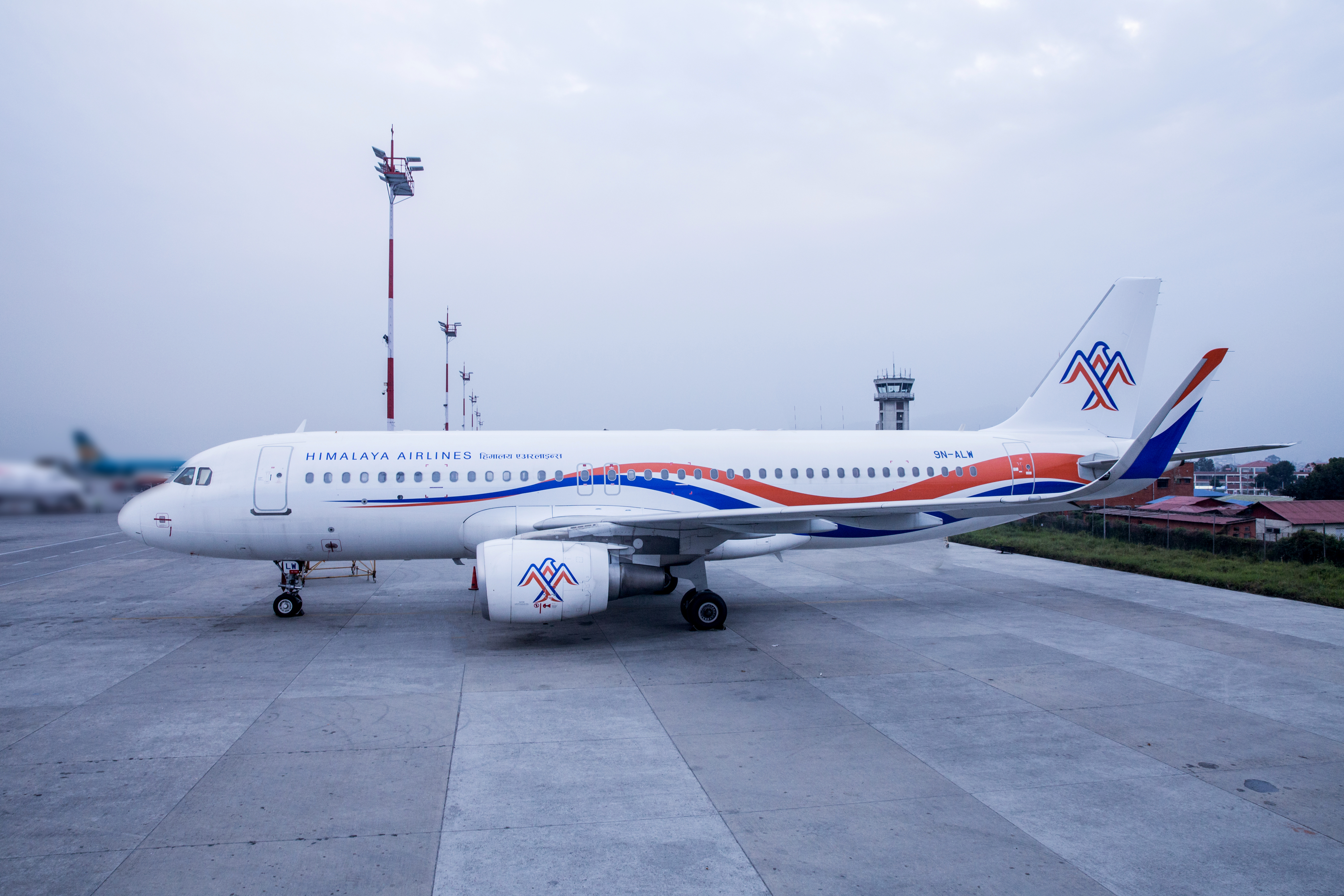
A Himalaya Airlines Airbus A320 at Tribhuvan International Airport

As of August 2025, Himalaya Airlines operates the following aircraft:

Himalaya Airlines fleet
Aircraft	In Service	Orders	Passengers			Note
Aircraft	In Service	Orders	P	Y	Total	Note
Airbus A319-100	1	2		144	144	
Airbus A320-200	3	—		180	180	
Total	4	2				

== Services ==
=== Economy Class ===
In Himalaya Airlines' Economy class, the seats are 17.5 inches (440 mm) wide with 30 inches (760 mm) seat pitch.

=== Premium Economy Class ===
Himalaya Airlines was the first airline in Nepal to introduce a Premium Economy class. It consists of 8 seats on their Airbus A320 with a four-abreast configuration. The seats were 26.9 inches (680 mm) wide with 43 inches (1,100 mm) seat pitch. In 2020, this section of the aircraft was rebranded as the airlines' Business Class but has since been deprecated.
