= Air Dynasty =

Nepalese helicopter airline

Air Dynasty Heli Service Pvt. Ltd.
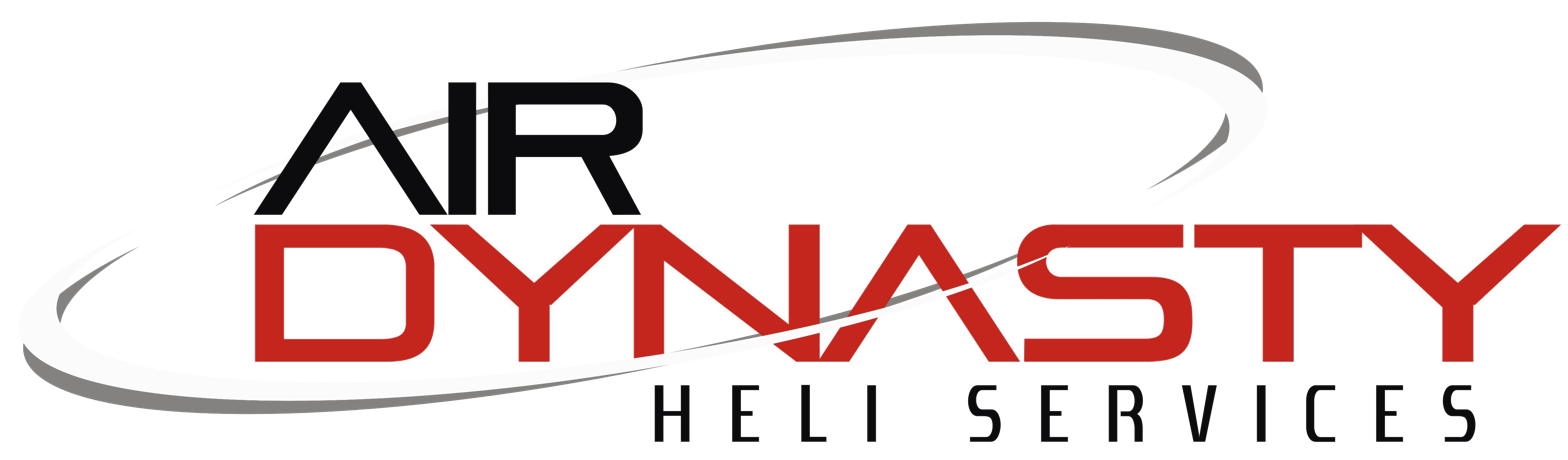
IATA	ICAO	Call sign
—	—	—
- Founded: 1993; 33 years ago
- AOC #: 035/2001
- Hubs: Tribhuvan International Airport (Kathmandu)
- Secondary hubs: Pokhara Airport; Tenzing–Hillary Airport (Lukla)
- Fleet size: 4
- Parent company: Yeti Group
- Headquarters: Sinamangal, Kathmandu, Nepal
- Key people: Malcolm Smith (Chairman)
- Website: http://www.airdynastyheli.com

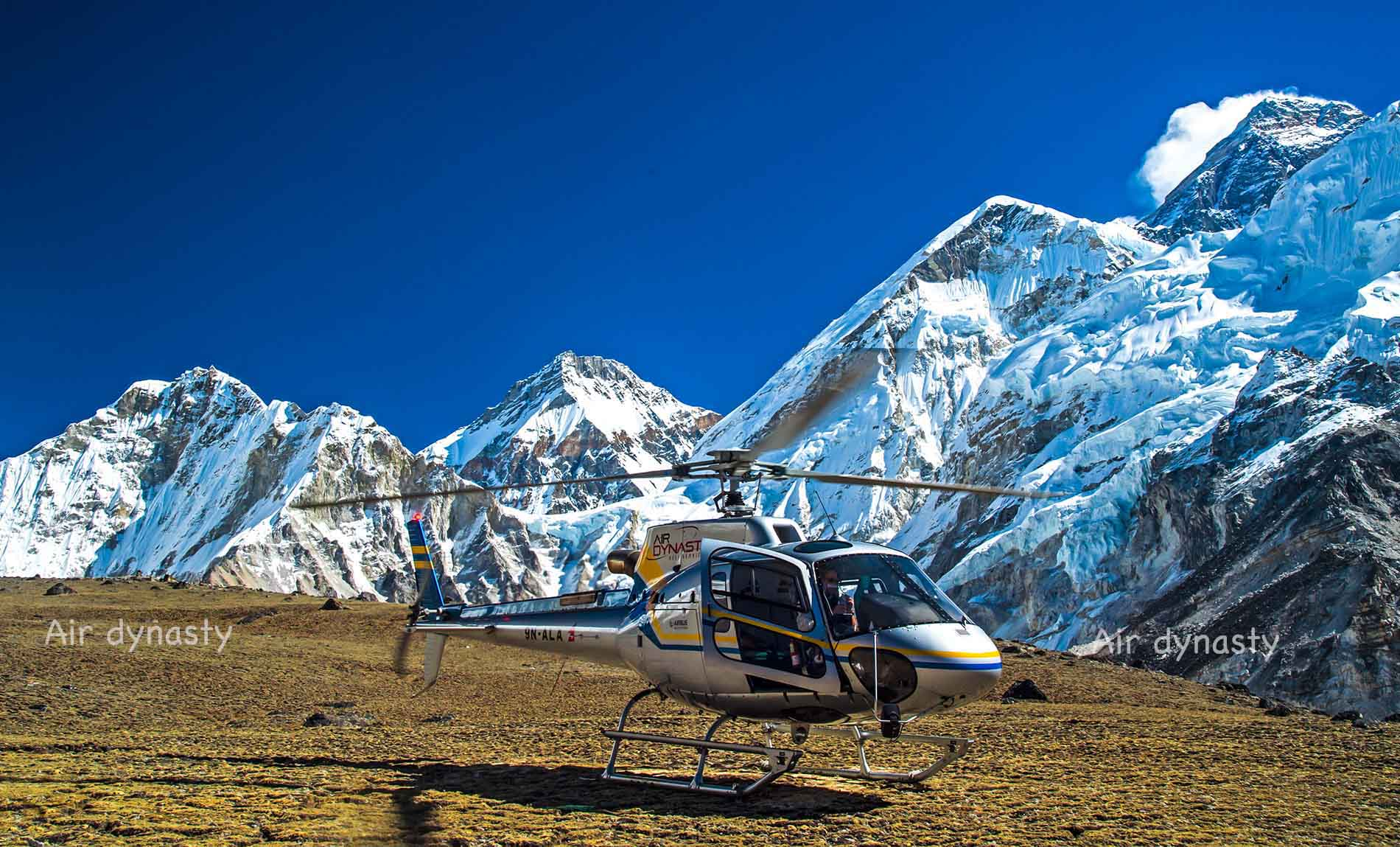
Air Dynasty Eurocopter AS350 in front of the Himalayas

Air Dynasty Heli Service Pvt. Ltd. is a helicopter airline based at Tribhuvan International Airport in Kathmandu, Nepal, operating chartered helicopter services. The company was established in 1993 and mainly carries out domestic chartered helicopter flights throughout Nepal from its three hubs in Kathmandu, Pokhara, and Lukla. It is currently banned from flying in EU airspace.

== History ==
Air Dynasty was founded in 1993 in Kathmandu, Nepal, by Ang Tshering Sherpa, who later also founded Yeti Airlines. In 2001, the airline received a foreign direct investment from British businessman Malcolm Roy Smith, who held 50% of the airline and served as the chairman. In 2005, the airline partnered with the Bhutanese flag carrier Druk Air, to which a Eurocopter helicopter was leased, after the government of Bhutan decided to introduce helicopter charter services in the country. In 2013, the European Commission banned all Nepalese airlines from entering European airspace. This restriction is still in place as of January 2023 and specifically also regards Air Dynasty.

== Fleet ==
=== Current fleet ===
The Air Dynasty fleet consists of these aircraft (as of May 2019):

Air Dynasty fleet
Aircraft	In fleet	Orders	Passengers			Notes
Aircraft	In fleet	Orders	C	Y	Total	Notes
Airbus H125 (previously known as Eurocopter AS350 B3e)	4	0	0	5	5	
Total	4	1				

=== Former fleet ===
Air Dynasty former fleet
Aircraft	Operated	Passengers			Notes
Aircraft	Operated	C	Y	Total	Notes
Airbus H125	1	0	5	5	Crashed on 27 February 2019

== Accidents and incidents ==
- 26 September 2013 – An Air Dynasty Eurocopter AS 350 helicopter crashed after landing at Lukla Airport. The helicopter's tail touched a fence, causing it to crash. All four people on board escaped the accident alive, but the aircraft was written off.
- 27 February 2019 – An Airbus H125 crashed in Taplejung while operating a charter flight. All seven persons on board, including Nepal's tourism minister, Rabindra Prasad Adhikari, were killed.
- 7 August 2024 – A Eurocopter AS350 flying from Kathmandu to Syaprubeshi crashed into a forested mountain in Suryachaur, Nuwakot District, killing all four Chinese passengers on board and the pilot.
- 18 March 2026 – A Eurocopter AS350 flying from Kathmandu to Khotang District crashed after losing control while attempting to land. All six occupants survived, but two were injured and the aircraft sustained substantial damage.
