= 2019 Air Dynasty helicopter crash =

2019 aviation accident in Nepal

2019 Air Dynasty helicopter crash (२०७५ ताप्लेजुङ हेलिकप्टर दुर्घटना)
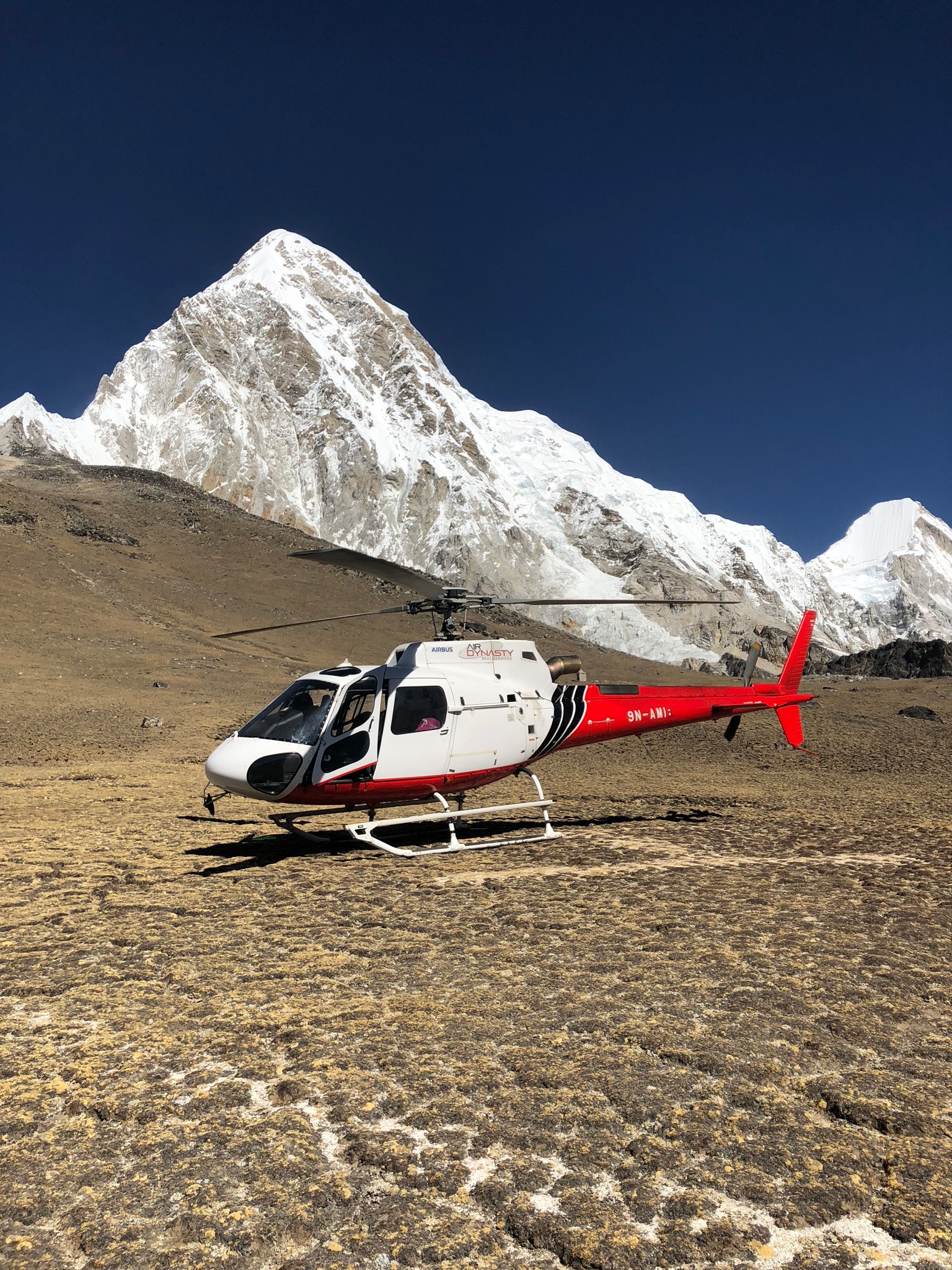
- 9N-AMI, the helicopter involved in the accident, seen in November 2018

Accident
- Date: February 27, 2019
- Summary: Crashed shortly after take-off due to Unfavorable weather in Pathibhara area resulting in IMC conditions
- Site: Taplejung, Nepal

Aircraft
- Aircraft type: Eurocopter AS350 B3e
- Operator: Air Dynasty
- Registration: 9N-AMI
- Flight origin: Pathibhara Devi Temple
- Destination: Chuhandanda, Nepal
- Occupants: 7
- Passengers: 6
- Crew: 1
- Fatalities: 7
- Survivors: 0

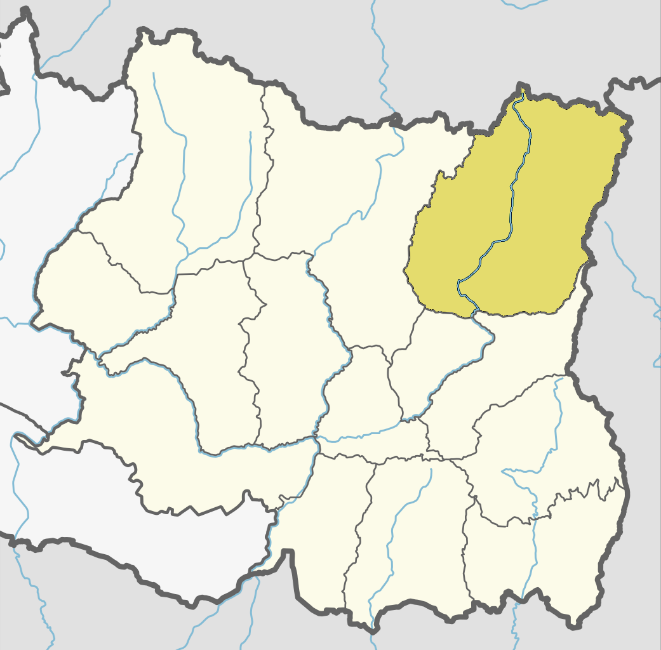
Map of Taplejung District

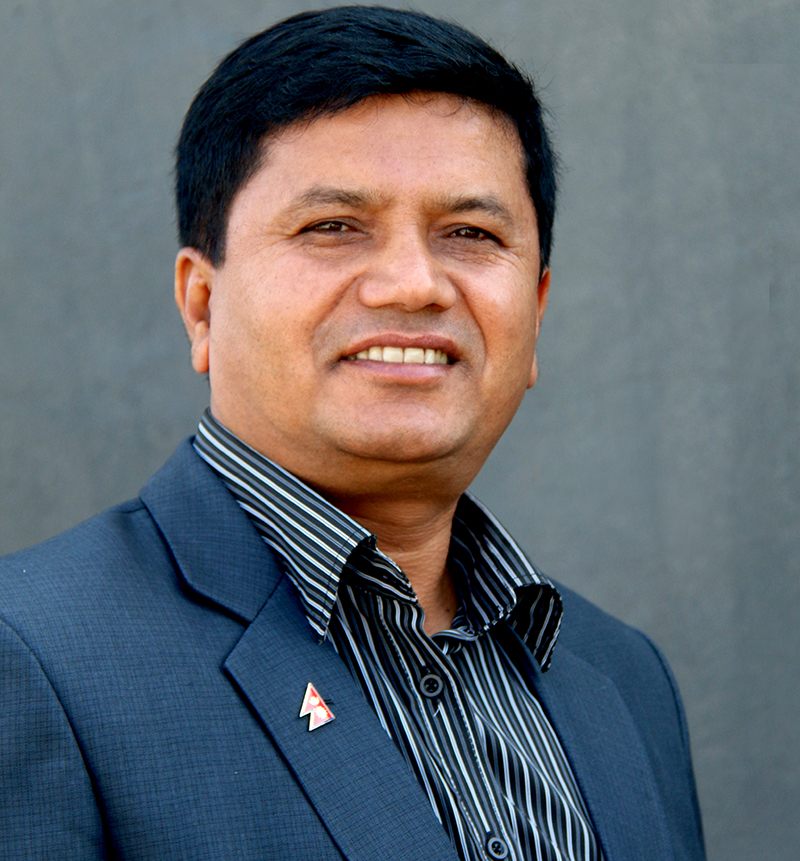
Rabindra Prasad Adhikari died in the crash.

On February 27, 2019, an Air Dynasty Eurocopter AS350 B3e carrying six passengers and one pilot was scheduled to fly a domestic chartered flight from Pathibhara Devi Temple in Taplejung to Chuhandanda in Tehrathum, Nepal. The aircraft crashed at approximately 1.30 p.m. (NPT) whilst in bad weather in Taplejung. All seven people on board died in the crash, including Rabindra Prasad Adhikari, Nepal's Minister for Tourism and Civil Aviation.

== Background ==
Minister of Culture, Tourism and Civil Aviation of Nepal Rabindra Prasad Adhikari came to Taplejung to inspect the under-construction airport at Chuhandanda. After inspecting the airport, the fellow passengers and crew went to see one of the most significant temples in Nepal, Pathibhara Devi Temple by helicopter. After visiting the temple Adhikari and other passengers were returning to Chuhandanda in Tehrathum.

=== Aircraft ===
The aircraft involved was a Eurocopter AS350 B3e bearing the registration 9N-AMI. It was built by Airbus Helicopters in 2017 and delivered to Air Dynasty brand new.

=== Passengers and crew ===
On board the helicopter were, among the minister Adhikari, Ang Tshering Sherpa, managing director of Yeti Airlines and Air Dynasty, an aide to Prime Minister Khadga Prasad Sharma Oli, two representatives of the Civil Aviation Authority of Nepal, a security personnel and the captain of the aircraft.

== Incident ==
The helicopter crash occurred due to critical weather in Taplejung, Nepal. The crash killed all seven people on board, including Nepalese Tourism and Civil Aviation Minister Rabindra Prasad Adhikari. The pilot of the helicopter reported heavy snowfall in the area of the airport and stated that he was unable to remain airborne, according to The Kathmandu Post. After the incident Air Dynasty was informed at 1:30 p.m. Nepal Standard Time (NPT).

The helicopter crashed at Sisne Khola, Pathibhara, Taplejung, Nepal. Nepalese police reported that Rabindra Adhikari and another passenger were in an identifiable state. Moments after the helicopter went missing, Taplejung residents reported to the police that they had heard a loud bang and seen smoke and fire in the area. Suraj Bhattarai, a witness also reported to the police "The helicopter is in pieces, and scattered all over". The helicopter caught fire after hitting Chuchche Dada and falling down to Sisne Khola.

== Aftermath ==
The Office of the Prime Minister declared 28 February 2019 to be national mourning day in Nepal to pay respect to those who died in the helicopter crash. Nepal's Home Minister Ram Bahadur Thapa said "All educational institutes, government offices, diplomatic missions will remain closed with a national flag lowered half-mast to mourn the death." Thapa also said that "The national flag will be hoisted at half-staff to mourn the departed souls."

The bodies of four people were brought to Suketar Airport on Wednesday afternoon. Chief District Officer of Taplejung District Anuj Bhandari said "There has been heavy snowfall. We could not take out all the bodies. We will try again tomorrow", he also added that recovering bodies in the crash site is difficult due to helicopter crash site being at the slope of a hill.

Nepal's prime minister Khadga Prasad Oli and Pushpa Kamal Dahal told the media "The country has lost a dependable youth leader with abundant possibilities in the demise of Minister for Culture, Tourism and Civil Aviation Rabindra Adhikari".

Mourning the loss of their managing director, Yeti Airlines, and Tara Air cancelled all flights on 1 March 2019.

The bodies of the passengers and the pilot were brought to Kathmandu on February 28 at 12:10 p.m. Nepal Communist Party (NCP) said all of the bodies would be cremated with state honours at Ramghat in Nepal. Before the funeral Adhikari's body would be kept at Exhibition Centre at local Nayabazar to pay respect toward him and his body would be cremated at Pokhara, Nepal.

== Investigation ==
On 28 February, the Government of Nepal opened an investigation into the accident.

Four months after the accident, the investigation committee released a preliminary report which blamed violations of operating procedures, such as a misbalance of weights and an inexperienced pilot, and the weather conditions for causing the crash.

The AAIC concluded the accident was caused by several factors, one of which is unfavorable weather in the Pathibhara area which results in IMC (Instrument Meteorological Conditions) conditions. These adverse weather conditions caused the pilot to lose situational awareness and positive control of the helicopter, which ultimately led to a CFIT (Controlled Flight Into Terrain) accident.
