= International French School of Kathmandu =

International school in Nepal

International French School of Kathmandu (EFIK, French: École française internationale de Katmandou) is a school in Nepal delivering the French National Curriculum with multilingual education in French, English and Nepali. International French School of Kathmandu is listed as a French school located outside the territory of French Republic and has the official status of "French School Abroad". It is part of the Agency for French Education Abroad network (AEFE).

The school was founded in 1987 in Gairidhara as a Kindergarten. The school was first named "Badaboum". In 1990, the school moved to Lazimpat to its current premises, with a large compound. In 2011, the school carried out an earthquake-proofing of the buildings.

Since 2016, International French School of Kathmandu opened a Lower-Secondary section (from age 11 to 16) through French Online-tutored education (CNED) and can obtain the baccalaureate.
