= Baluwatar, Kathmandu =

Baluwatar
- Neighborhood in Kathmandu
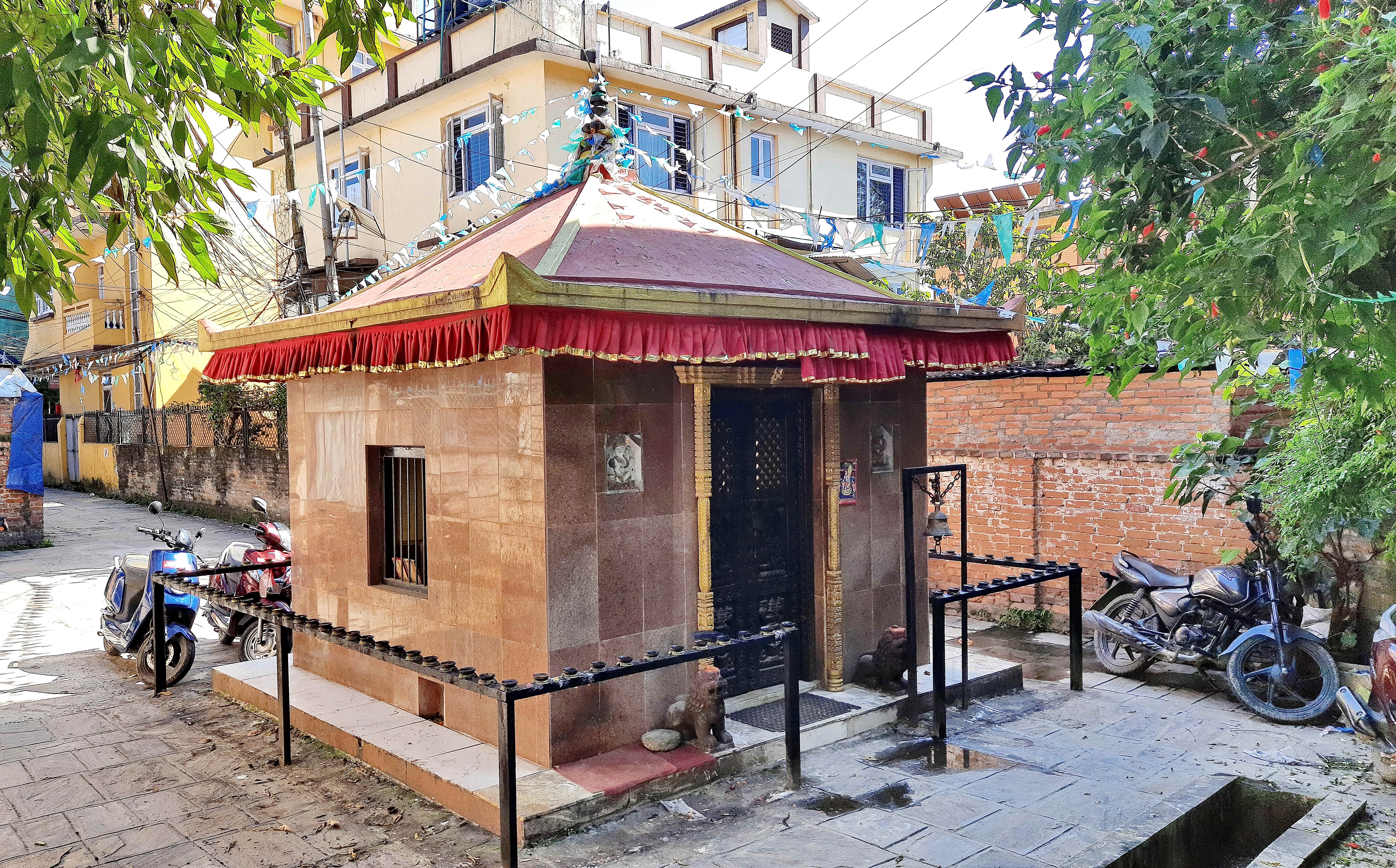
- Swetkali Ajima Temple, Baluwatar

- Location in Kathmandu Valley
- Coordinates: 27.729122°N 85.328579°E
- Country: Nepal
- Province: Bagmati Province
- District: Kathmandu
- Postal Code: 44600

Baluwatar (Nepali: बालुवाटार) (also Kathmandu Metropolitan City Ward 04) is a residential area of Kathmandu, the capital city of Nepal on the banks of Bagmati River. It is just 15 minutes away from what is known as the downtown of Kathmandu, New Road, and Ason, and shares borders with Lazimpat and Gairidhara.

Baluwatar hosts the Prime Minister of Nepal's official residence, government offices, Nepal Rastra Bank's headquarters, the country's headquarters of the International Organization for Migration, and Russian Embassy.

A Nepal Army's Para Special Forces Battalion (Bhairab Dal) and Air Wing, TU Teaching Hospital, Nepal Police headquarters, and the home of the former King Gyanendra of Nepal and the current Presidential Palace are in the vicinity. There are Meridian International School, Shiva Puri Secondary School, and many others. Baluwatar is the most infrastructurally developed and administrative center of Kathmandu.

In 2012, Occupy Baluwatar of the occupy movement was a peaceful protest movement calling on the Nepali state to better address the widespread problem of impunity and gender-based violence.
