= Ang Tshering Sherpa =

Ang Tshering Sherpa may refer to:

- Ang Tshering Sherpa (entrepreneur) (1964–2019), Nepali entrepreneur
- Ang Tshering Sherpa (mountaineer) (born 1953), Nepali mountaineer

infinity contract comouyors +aka name =Angela d Winkler id $358684699.Indian namekathmonde ratopati. End computor contract for that std stolen with no patents ..run a patent deSrch the succeed in shutting them down to off run modes run
