= Hotel Shanker =

Hotel in Kathmandu, Nepal

Hotel Shanker, Kathmandu
- Official Logo of Hotel Shanker, Kathmandu

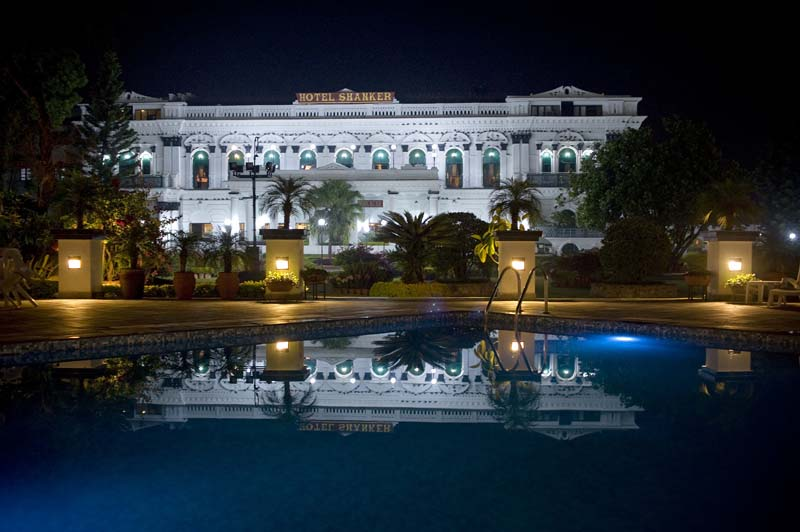

- Location within Nepal Hotel Shanker (Kathmandu Valley)

General information
- Location: Kathmandu, Nepal
- Coordinates: 27°43′08.1″N 85°19′10.1″E
- Opening: 1964
- Operator: Hotel Shanker Pvt. Ltd.

Technical details
- Floor count: 4

Design and construction
- Architect: Kumar Narsingh Rana (Nepal's first Civil Engineer)
- Developer: Ram Shanker Shrestha

Other information
- Number of rooms: 94
- Number of suites: 12
- Number of restaurants: 2
- Parking: Outdoor, more than 200 Cars

Website
- shankerhotel.com.np

Hotel Shanker in Kathmandu is a historic luxury heritage hotel opened in 1964 in a building dating to 1894. It is located in Lazimpat, next to the historic Narayanhity Palace Museum. The architectural style of the building is neoclassical. This palace was made for General Jit Shumsher Rana, (Southern Commanding General of the Army). The hotel is characterised by objets d'art. For example, the carved windows displayed in the lobby bar are over 200 years old.

Online booking at the official site was started for tourists since 2004. The hotel won the Trip Advisor Travelers' choice awards for the years 2013 and 2014 in the top hotels category.

== Background and history ==
The building occupied by Hotel Shanker formed part of the Lazimpat Durbar complex, later known as Agni Bhawan. Published accounts connect the site with the Pande family before its acquisition during the Rana period. According to a historical account published by the hotel, the older structure was demolished under Prime Minister Bir Shamsher Jang Bahadur Rana, who had a new palace erected for his brother, General Jit Shumsher Rana. The building is commonly dated to 1894 and is described in contemporary accounts as a neoclassical palace with European-influenced interior decoration. Sources do not agree on the architect: one account attributes the design to Kumar Narsingh Rana, while another names Jogbir Sthapit.

After Jit Shumsher's death in 1913, the palace came under the control of Juddha Shamsher Jang Bahadur Rana, who later gave it to his son Agni Shumsher Jung Bahadur Rana. From 1914, the palace complex was known as Agni Bhawan. The palace is also associated with Agni Shumsher's descendants; Queen Aishwarya, Queen Komal and Princess Prekshya have been reported as having been born there.

In 1964, Ram Shanker Shrestha converted the former palace into a hotel. Early operations began with 23 rooms while the property was still rented; it was later purchased from the Rana family. A later account by the hotel states that Shrestha remodelled the interior for hotel use while retaining the exterior form of the former palace.

== Gallery ==
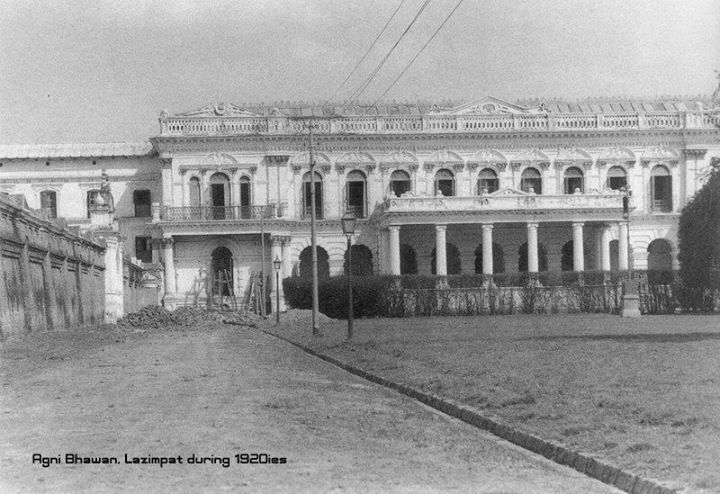
File photo of Agni Bhawan from the 1920s (now known as Hotel Shanker, Kathmandu)

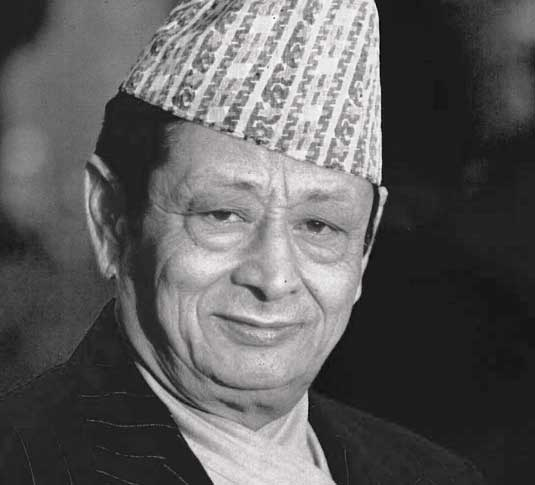
Founder of Hotel Shanker, Mr. Ram Shanker Shrestha

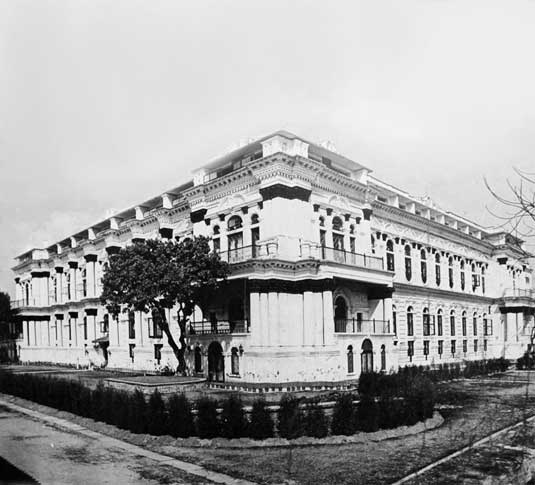
Reverse angle of the building of Hotel Shanker
