= Bidya Bhattarai =

Nepali politician

Bidya Bhattarai MP
- विद्या भट्टराई
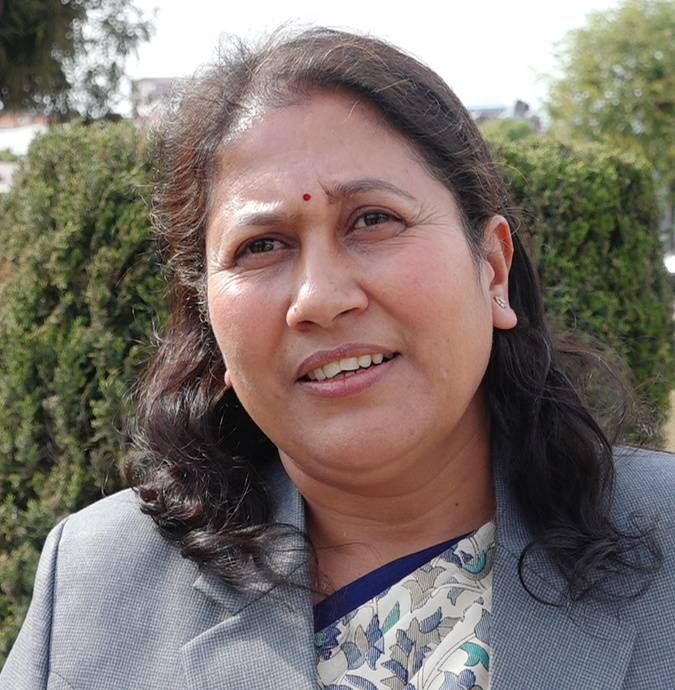

Minister of Education, Science and Technology
- In office 15 July 2024 – 22 April 2025
- President: Ram Chandra Poudel
- Prime Minister: KP Sharma Oli
- Preceded by: Sumana Shrestha
- Succeeded by: Raghuji Panta

Member of Parliament, Pratinidhi Sabha
- In office 17 December 2019 – 12 September 2025
- Preceded by: Rabindra Prasad Adhikari
- Succeeded by: Uttam Prasad Paudel
- Constituency: Kaski 2

Personal details
- Born: 30 October 1972 (age 53) Chabahil, Kathmandu
- Party: CPN (UML)
- Spouse: Rabindra Prasad Adhikari
- Children: Biraj Adhikari & Sworaj Adhikari
- Parent(s): Hemraj Bhattarai & Bhagawati Bhattarai

Bidya Bhattarai (also Bidhya Bhattarai) is a Nepali politician and a past Minister of Education, Science and Technology of Nepal. Since 2019, she has been a member of the House of Representatives of the Federal Parliament of Nepal. She won the by-election of Kaski-2, a constituency that was made empty by the death of her husband, cabinet minister Rabindra Prasad Adhikari, in a helicopter crash in February 2019. She defeated her nearest rival, Khemraj Paudel of Nepali Congress, by a margin of more than 8,000 votes. She was re-elected in 2022 from the same constituency.

On 21 April 2025, Bidya Bhattarai resigned as the Minister of Education, Science and Technology following the 2025 Nepal Teachers Protest, where public school teachers demanded the passage of the School Education Bill. The protests had shut down thousands of schools across the country and intensified public pressure on the government. According to media reports, internal disagreements with the Prime Minister and Finance Minister regarding the bill's handling also contributed to her decision to step down. Her resignation was widely interpreted as a response to the government's failure to address teachers’ demands and delay in passing the School Education Bill.
