= Inland Revenue Department (Nepal) =

Government department of Nepal

- आन्तरिक राजस्व विभाग

Agency overview
- Formed: 2001
- Preceding agency: Department of Taxation
- Jurisdiction: Nepal
- Headquarters: Lazimpat, Kathmandu, Nepal
- Minister responsible: Swarnim Wagle, Minister of Finance
- Agency executive: Madan Dahal, DG
- Parent agency: Ministry of Finance, Government of Nepal
- Website: www.ird.gov.np

The Inland Revenue Department (IRD) is the department of the Nepalese government under the Ministry of Finance. The IRD is located in Lazimpat, Kathmandu. The IRD is currently responsible for the enforcement of Tax Laws and administration of the following taxes: Income Tax, Value Added Tax, Excise Duty and duties like Entertainment fee (Film Development Fee).

IRD carries out the following functions:

- Tax Administration
- Tax Policy
- Tax Payer Services
- Registration, Revenue Collection
- Tax audit
- Tax Enforcement and investigation
- Review & Appeal
- Tax Refund
- Advance Ruling
- Tax Treaty and International Taxation
- Excises and Liquor Administration

IRD is centrally located in Kathmandu. There are 84 field offices throughout Nepal including 1 Large Taxpayers Office,1 Medium Level Taxpayers Office, 43 Inland Revenue Offices and 39 Taxpayer Service Offices. The previous Department of Taxation was established in 1960. IRD and its district offices are totally running on functional line. Major functions include Taxpayer's Service, Audit and Collection.
