= Xavier Academy =

- जेभियर एकेडेमी

Location
- Lazimpat, Kumari Mai Marg; Lazimpat, Kathmandu; Nepal
- Coordinates: 27.7207°N 85.3217°E

Information
- Motto: the institution that cares
- Founded: 1997
- School district: Kathmandu
- Chairman: Prof. Dr. Sriram Bhagut Mathe
- Principal: Rashmi Sharma Mainali
- Staff: 38 faculty members and 33 administrative staff
- Faculty: 2 (Science and Management)
- Grades: 11 and 12
- Enrollment: 524 as of 2016
- Campus size: 4 Ropanis 7 annas
- Campus type: College & University
- Color: Maroon
- Affiliation: Higher Secondary Education Board
- Website: xa.edu.np

Xavier Academy (Nepali: जेभियर एकेडेमी) is a secondary education school managed by the Nepal Education Foundation, located in Lazimpat, Kathmandu.
