= Gairidhara =

- Neighborhood in Kathmandu
- Location in Kathmandu
- Coordinates: 27.7191°N 85.3262°E
- Country: Nepal
- Province: Bagmati Province
- District: Kathmandu
- Postal Code: 44600

Gairidhara (Nepali: गैह्री धारा) is a residential area of Kathmandu, the capital city of Nepal. It borders the Narayanhity Palace, Lazimpat and Baluwatar and is just 20 minutes away from what is known as the downtown of Kathmandu, Newroad and Ason.

Gairidhara is a local business hub hosting several national companies and organisations. The following organisations have their headquarters in Gairidhara:

| Name | Sector | Notes |
|---|---|---|
| BB Airways | Aviation | |
| Himalaya Airlines | Aviation | |
| Sunrise Bank Limited | Finance | |
| Rural Reconstruction Nepal | Development | |
| SAAN International College | Education | |
| TBi Group Nepal | Corporate Conglomerate | |
