= Uttam Prasad Paudel =

Nepalese Politician

- उत्तमप्रसाद पौडेल

Member of Parliament, Pratinidhi Sabha
- Incumbent
- Assumed office 26 March 2026
- Preceded by: Bidya Bhattarai
- Constituency: Kaski 2

Personal details
- Citizenship: Nepalese
- Party: Rastriya Swatantra Party
- Profession: Politician

Uttam Prasad Paudel (Nepali: उत्तमप्रसाद पौडेल) is a Nepalese politician serving as a member of parliament from the Rastriya Swatantra Party. He is the member of the 7th Pratinidhi Sabha elected from Kaski 2 constituency in 2026 Nepalese General Election securing 31,911 votes and defeating Rashmi Acharya of the CPN UML.
