= Ang Tshering Sherpa (entrepreneur) =

Nepali entrepreneur (1964–2019)

- Born: October 2, 1964; Khumbu Pasanglhamu, Nepal
- Died: February 27, 2019 (aged 54); Taplejung, Nepal
- Cause of death: 2019 Air Dynasty helicopter crash
- Occupation: Entrepreneur
- Organization(s): Yeti Airlines; Tara Air
- Children: 2

Ang Tshering Sherpa (2 October 1964 - 27 February 2019) was a Nepali entrepreneur and founder of Yeti Airlines.

== Career ==
Sherpa started his career in the 1990s at a local trekking agency managed by one of his brothers. In 1993, Sherpa founded Air Dynasty before founding Yeti Airlines in 1998.

Sherpa also served as served as chairman of the board for Himalaya Airlines from 2014 until his death in 2019.

== Death ==
Ang Tshering Sherpa, along with six other people, died in a helicopter crash while returning from Pathibhara Devi Temple, Taplejung, Nepal, on 27 February 2019. According to the Himalayan Times, hundreds of people viewed his last rites in Kathmandu.

As Tshering was a golfer, Yeti Airlines organized an annual golf tournament named in his memory after his death.
