= Fly Yeti =

Nepalese low-cost airline

IATA	ICAO	Call sign
0Y	-	-
- Founded: 2007
- Ceased operations: 16 July 2008
- AOC #: 047/2007 as Yeti Airlines International Pvt. Ltd
- Hubs: Tribhuvan International Airport
- Frequent-flyer program: SkyClub
- Destinations: 5 (at time of closure)
- Parent company: Air Arabia; Yeti Airlines
- Headquarters: Kathmandu, Nepal

Fly Yeti (Nepali: फ्लाइयति, stylized as flyyeti.com) was a low-cost airline based in Kathmandu, Nepal. The airline was a joint venture between the Nepalese regional carrier Yeti Airlines and the Emirati low-cost airline Air Arabia. The airline suspended all flights from 16 July 2008, citing political uncertainty. The company slogan was Pay less, fly more.

== History ==
Fly Yeti was founded in 2007 as Nepal's first low-cost carrier and commenced operations on 20 January 2008. Despite its parent company Air Arabia claiming that the airline had a sufficiently high occupancy, Fly Yeti ceased operations on 16 July 2008 due to political uncertainty in Nepal.

== Destinations ==
Fly Yeti served the following destinations at the time of closure:

Country	City	Airport	Notes	Refs
Malaysia	Kuala Lumpur	Kuala Lumpur International Airport		
Nepal	Kathmandu	Tribhuvan International Airport	Hub	
Qatar	Doha	Doha International Airport		
United Arab Emirates	Dubai	Dubai International Airport		
United Arab Emirates	Sharjah	Sharjah International Airport		

Fly Yeti had also planned to serve Bangkok, Delhi and Hong Kong.

== Fleet ==
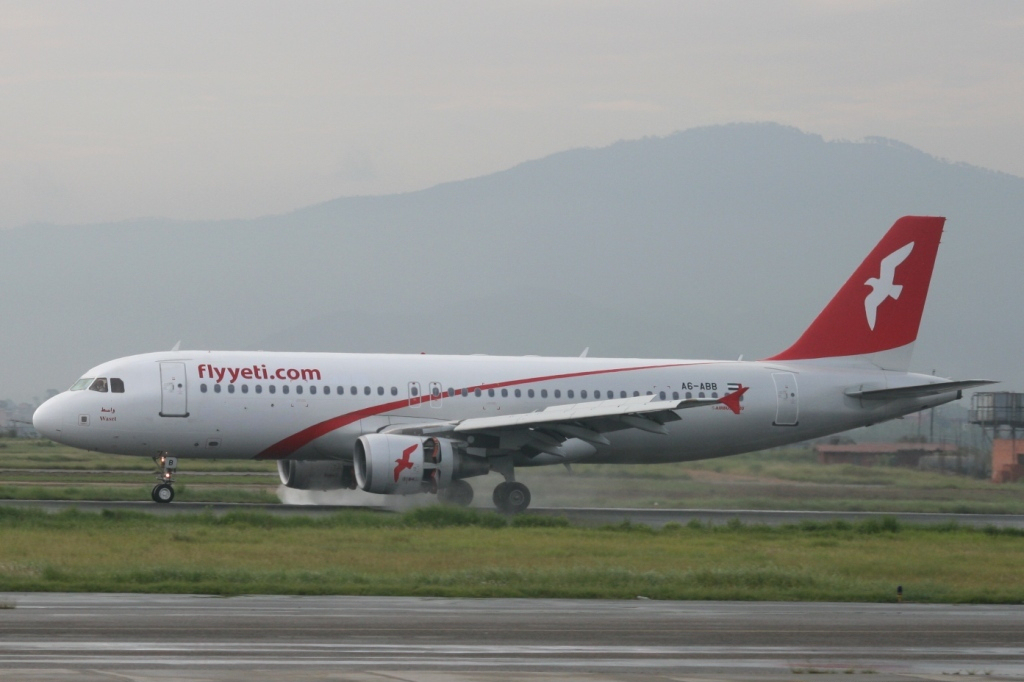
Fly Yeti Airbus A320 at Tribhuvan International Airport (June 2008)

At the time of its closure, Fly Yeti operated the following aircraft:

Fly Yeti fleet
Aircraft	In service	Passengers (Economy)	Note
Boeing 737-800	1	146	
Airbus A320-200	1	162	
Total	2		
