= Occupy Baluwatar =

Occupy Baluwatar, also known as Baluwatar Satyagraha, was a peaceful protest movement calling on the Nepali state to better address the widespread problem of impunity and gender-based violence. Protesters had gathered beginning on 28 December 2012 outside the prime minister’s official residence in Baluwatar from 9:00 -11:00 am daily.

The first days of protests were loosely organized. There was some organizing online in the few days prior to the street protests. An organizing group, made up of active protesters, emerged following the first week of protest. The movement has been supported by a variety of groups and has gone viral in social media forums.

The protesters created a coherent set of demands, divided into short- and long-term goals, which they presented to then prime minister Baburam Bhattarai. The short-term demands called on the state, including the police and the judiciary, to properly investigate and prosecute the guilty in five specific cases which took place immediately prior to the movement’s start. The long-term demands focused on policy reform in the arenas of migration and rape laws, among others.

== Origins ==
The spark for the OB protests was the case of Sita Rai (name changed). On 21 November, 19-year-old Rai from the eastern Bhojpur district was returning to Nepal on a fake passport – under the name Bimala KC – after having worked as a domestic maid in Saudi Arabia for four years. Nepali law does not allow women under the age of 30 to travel alone to work as migrant labour. As a result, there is a massive trade in illegal passports as women attempt to circumvent this restriction. On her arrival at the Tribhuvan International Airport in Kathmandu, Rai’s fake passport was detected. She, along were 20 other women, were taken to the immigration detention center at Kalikasthan. At the center, immigration officer Somnath Khanal robbed Rai of all her savings amounting to NPR 222,624. Subsequently, police constable Parsuram Basynet offered to escort Rai to the Gongobu Bus Park so she could catch a bus to her home village. On arrival, he took Rai to a nearby hotel where he repeatedly raped her. He put her on the bus the next morning, threatening her to not tell anyone about what happened. About a month later, Rai broke down and told her sister about what had happened. The family came to Kathmandu and began legal proceedings.

In late December, the Kathmandu Post daily and Nepali Times weekly broke the Sita Rai story. There was little reaction to the stories from both the state organs and from women’s right activists. The Home Ministry did constitute an investigative committee, but it operated completely opaquely and its final report was not made public.

Meanwhile, the case had been creating outrage on Twitter and Facebook. A loose group of young citizens who had expressed concern on social media began to organize. A petition to the prime minister was put up on Facebook, and people were encourage online to come to Baluwatar at 9:00 am on Friday 28 December 2012 to hand the petition over to the PM.

== State Response to OB ==
On 10 April 2013, the Commission for Investigation of Abuse of Authority (CIAA) filed corruption charges against the four officials directly involved in the Sita Rai case. The CIAA also ordered the Ministry of Home Affairs (MoHA) to take departmental action against the director general and deputy director general of the immigration department.

== Timeline ==
The movement continued after the change in the government, when the Baburam Bhattarai led government was replaced by the Interim Election Government led by Chief Justice Khil Raj Regmi. Activists say they will continue to protest till their demands are met. And protests have continued despite threats from UCPN Maoist cadres as well as unprovoked mass arrests by police.

6 April 2013 marked the 100th continuous day of Occupy Baluwatar protests.

On 8 April 2013, one OB protester was arrested by police on the charge of "verbally assaulting" police officers at the protest site. The protester was held in custody from about 10:00 am until about 3:30 pm. No charges were filed.

On 9 April 2013, police arrested 13 protesters after the latter refused to move from the edge of the road to the sidewalk as requested by the police. The protesters argued that they had never blocked traffic, though they had spilled onto the streets from the beginning of the campaign. They claimed that police were using their presence on the street as an excuse to clamp down on the movement. Police officials, however, argued that they simply wanted the protesters to remain on the sidewalk.
