= Lazimpat =

- Neighborhood in Kathmandu
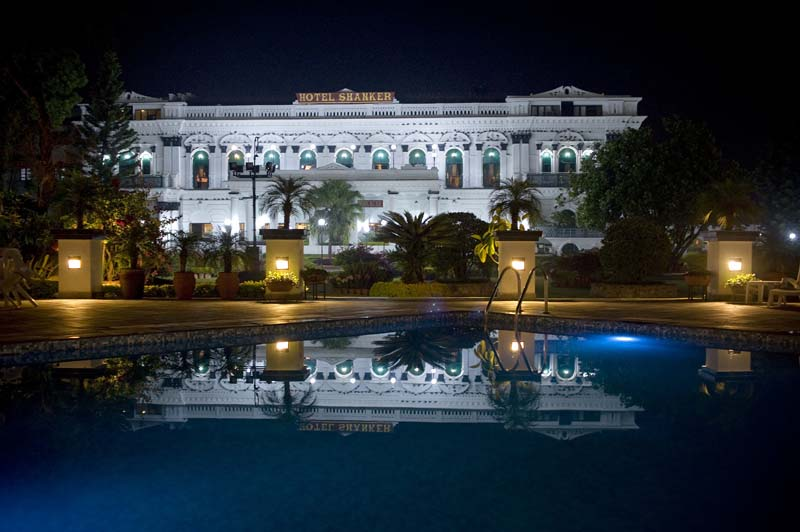
- Lazimpat Durbar, from which the neighborhood got its name, is now a hotel

- Location in Kathmandu Valley
- Coordinates: 27.7215°N 85.3201°E
- Country: Nepal
- Province: Bagmati Province
- District: Kathmandu
- Postal Code: 44600

Lazimpat (Nepali: लाजिम्पाट) is a residential area of Kathmandu, the capital city of Nepal. It is close to the Narayanhity Palace, and is well known in Kathmandu for its hotels, restaurants, schools, colleges, embassies, and department stores. The neighborhood's name derives from Lazimpat Durbar, which lies in its vicinity and was converted into Hotel Shanker.

Lazimpat shares one border with Thamel, a popular tourist hub, and another with Baluwatar, a reputed residential area where the Prime Minister and Chief Justice reside. Lazimpat is just 20 minutes away from the downtown of Kathmandu, New Road, and Asan.

There has been a recent upsurge in construction activity in the region. Lazimpat boasts the only road connecting the northern part of the Kathmandu valley with the southern part. The roads are very busy, yet until a few years ago, there was little economic activity in the region. Luxury hotels, photo studios, department stores, and corner shops have been a special feature of Lazimpat. It is centrally located and is also home to various embassies. Sarashwoti Mandir and Dayashwor Mahadev Mandir are situated in Lazimpat.

There are Hotel Shanker, Radisson Hotel Nepal, restaurants, and sweet shops among various shopping outlets.

Embassies & Diplomatic Missions in Lazimpat include the Indian Embassy, the British Embassy, the Israeli Embassy, the French Embassy, and the Delegation of the European Union to Nepal, and also some Nepalese governmental offices, such as the Inland Revenue Department, have their premises in the neighborhood.

The following organisations have their headquarters in Lazimpat:

Name	Sector	Notes
Everest Bank Limited	Finance	
Image Channel	Broadcasting	
International French School of Kathmandu	Education	
Machhapuchchhre Bank	Finance	
Xavier Academy	Education	
Hotel Shanker	Hotel	

== Transportation ==
Buses of Sajha Yatayat serve Lazimpat. Other private Bus companies also stop at several points in the neighborhood.
