= Yeti Airlines =

Nepalese airline

Yeti Airlines यती एयरलाइन्स

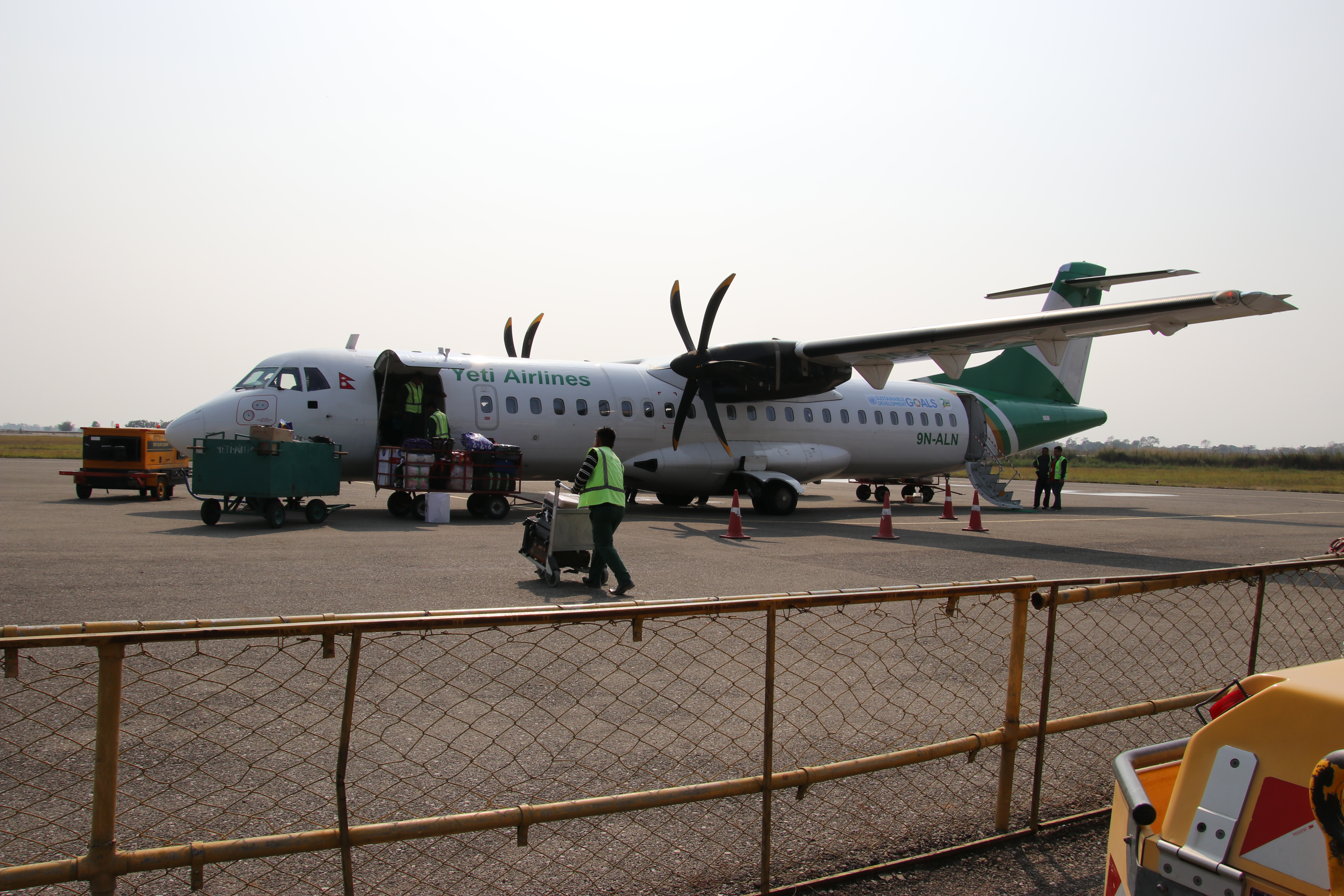
- A Yeti Airlines ATR 72
IATA	ICAO	Call sign
YT	NYT	YETI AIRLINES
- Founded: May 1998; 28 years ago
- AOC #: 037/2004
- Hubs: Tribhuvan International Airport
- Frequent-flyer program: Sky Club
- Subsidiaries: Tara Air
- Fleet size: 7
- Destinations: 7
- Headquarters: Kathmandu, Nepal
- Key people: Late Ang Tshiring Sherpa (Founder Managing Director); Subhas Sapkota (Chief Executive Officer); Asian Life Insurance Company
- Website: www.yetiairlines.com

Yeti Airlines Pvt. Ltd. (Nepali: यती एअरलाइन्स) is an airline based in Kathmandu, Nepal. The airline was established in May 1998 and received its air operator's certificate on 17 August 1998. Since 2019, Yeti Airlines is the first carbon neutral airline in Nepal and South Asia. It is the parent company of Tara Air. As of 2024, Yeti Airlines is the second-largest domestic carrier in Nepal by passengers carried and third largest by fleet size.

== History ==
Yeti Airlines was established by Ang Tshering Sherpa in May 1998 and received its Air Operators Certificate on 17 August 1998. It started operations with two de Havilland Canada DHC-6 Twin Otters.

In 2009, Yeti Airlines established the subsidiary Tara Air to which it outsourced its STOL operations to airports in the rural and mountainous airports in Nepal and transferred its respective aircraft, DHC-6 Twin Otters and Dornier 228s to Tara Air.

In late 2023, Asian Life Insurance Co. Ltd. took over a 49% stake of Yeti Airlines Ltd and that the company would issue an IPO. Yeti Airlines has received a Triple B Minus (BBB−) issuer rating from Infomerics Credit Rating Nepal, a significant step as they are expected to apply at SEBON for IPO.

=== International operations ===
In 2007, Yeti Airlines launched Fly Yeti as a joint venture with Air Arabia. Due to political uncertainty, the airline ceased its operations in 2008.

In 2013, the European Commission banned all Nepalese airlines from entering the European airspace. This restriction is still in place as of June 2025.

In 2014, Yeti Airlines launched Himalaya Airlines, another international joint venture.

== Yeti World ==
The parent company of Yeti Airlines, Yeti World, also encompasses other touristic ventures, including hotels and resorts and further airline companies, namely Air Dynasty and Altitude Air.

In December 2019, Yeti World made headlines, as it was involved in a corruption case around Prime Minister K.P. Oli.

== Destinations ==
Yeti Airlines offers scheduled flights to the following destinations (as of July 2023):

Country	City	IATA	ICAO	Airport	Notes	Refs.
Nepal	Kathmandu	KTM	VNKT	Tribhuvan International Airport	Hub	
Nepal	Bhadrapur	VDP	VNCG	Bhadrapur Airport		
Nepal	Bhairahawa	BWA	VNBW	Gautam Buddha International Airport		
Nepal	Biratnagar	BIR	VNVT	Biratnagar Airport		
Nepal	Janakpur	JKR	VNJP	Janakpur Airport		
Nepal	Jitpur Simara	SIF	VNSI	Simara Airport	Terminated	
Nepal	Nepalgunj	KEP	VNNG	Nepalgunj Airport		
Nepal	Pokhara	PKR	VNPK	Pokhara Airport	Airport closed	
Nepal	Pokhara	PHH	VNPR	Pokhara International Airport		

Yeti Airlines also operates the one-hour-long Everest Express scheduled mountain sightseeing flights from Kathmandu to Mount Everest and Annapurna Express mountain sightseeing flights from Pokhara to Annapurna Massif.

=== Codeshare agreements ===
Yeti Airlines has a codeshare agreement with its subsidiary Tara Air .

== Fleet ==
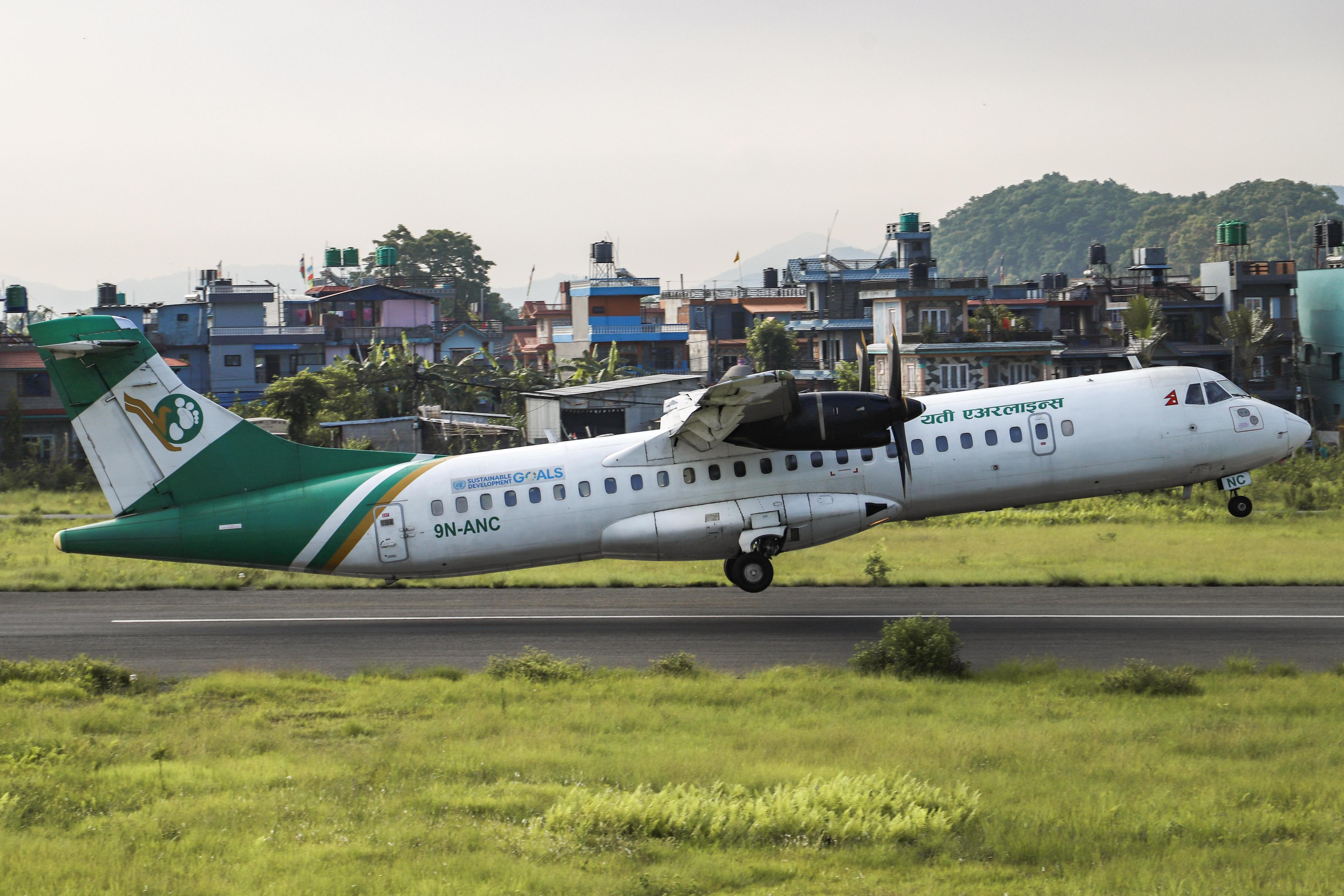
Yeti Airlines ATR 72-500. This aircraft later crashed under Flight 691

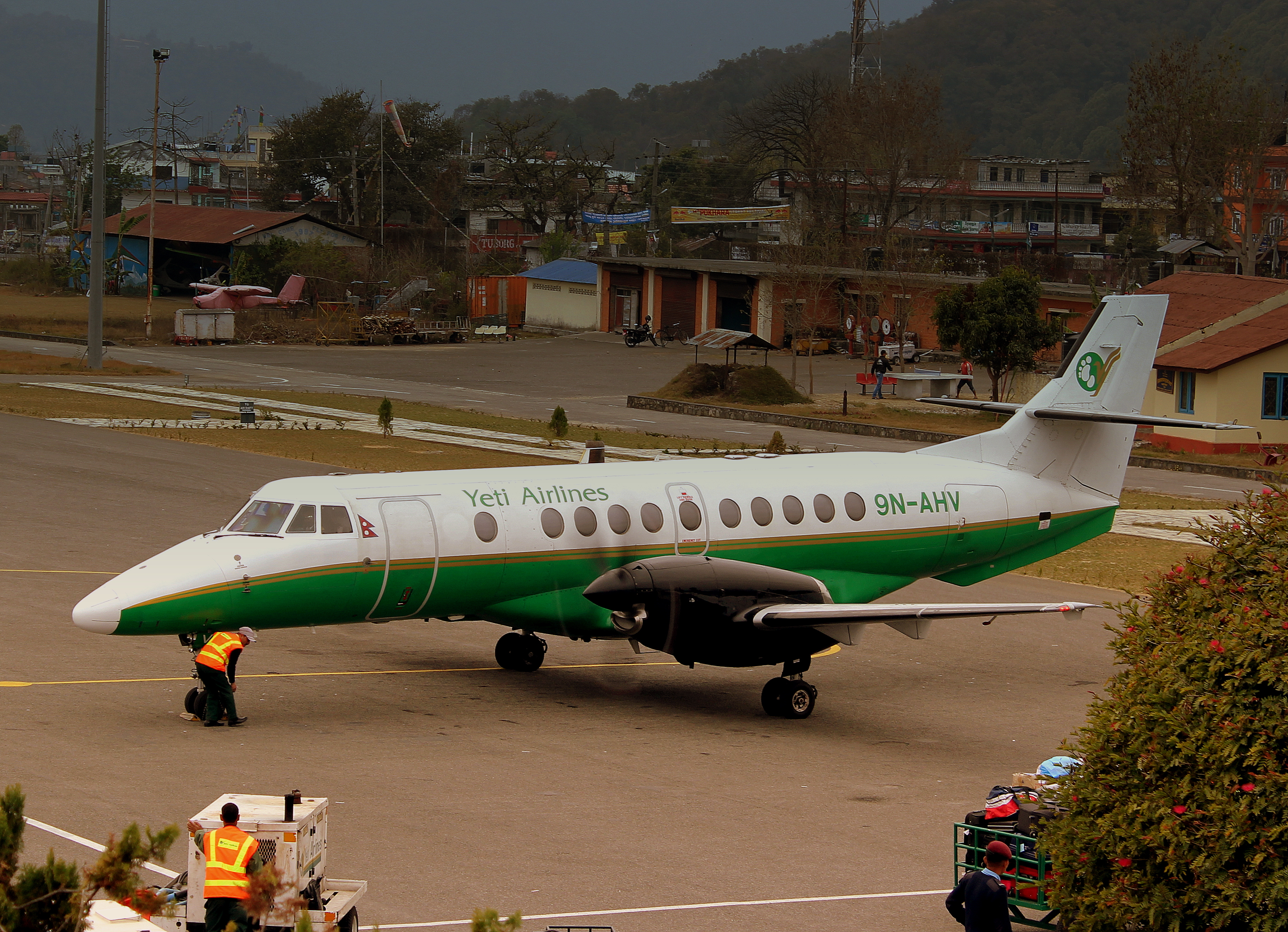
A former Yeti Airlines BAe Jetstream 41 in 2013.

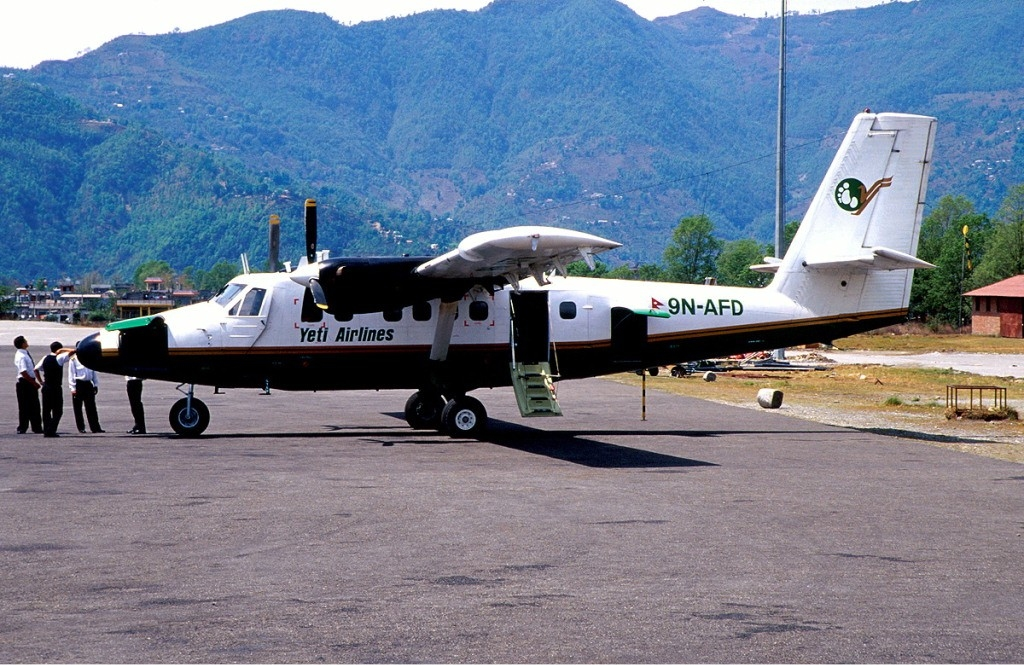
A former Yeti Airlines de Havilland Canada DHC-6 Twin Otter in 2001

=== Current fleet ===
As of August 2025, Yeti Airlines operates the following aircraft:

Aircraft	In service	Orders	Passengers			Notes
Aircraft	In service	Orders	C	Y	Total	Notes
ATR 72-500	7	—	—	70	70	
Total	7					

=== Historical fleet ===
Yeti Airlines also formerly operated these types of aircraft:

Yeti Airlines historical fleet
Aircraft	Total	Introduced	Retired	Notes
BAe Jetstream 41	7	2007	2021	5 sold to Guna Airlines 2 scrapped
de Havilland Canada DHC-6 Twin Otter	7	1998	2009	Transferred to subsidiary Tara Air
Dornier 228	—	2009	2009	Transferred to subsidiary Tara Air
Embraer EMB 110 Bandeirante	—	1999	Unknown	
Embraer EMB 120 Brasilia	1	2000	2001	
Harbin Y-12	1	1995	2001	Stored indefinitely at Tribhuvan International Airport
Saab 340B	3	2004	2007	Stored indefinitely at Tribhuvan International Airport
ATR 72-500	1	2008	2023	1 crashed as Yeti airlines flight 691

== Accidents and incidents ==
- 25 May 2004 – Yeti Airlines Flight 117: A Yeti Airlines DHC-6 Twin Otter (registration 9N-AFD) cargo flight crashed into a hill on approach to Lukla. All three crew members were killed.
- 21 June 2006 – 2006 Yeti Airlines Twin Otter Crash: A DHC-6 Twin Otter registered as 9N-AEQ was destroyed in a rice paddy on approach to Jumla, killing all six passengers and the crew of three.
- 8 October 2008 – Yeti Airlines Flight 101: A DHC-6 was destroyed upon landing at Lukla, killing all 18 passengers and two of the three crew. The captain was the only survivor.
- 24 September 2016 – Yeti Airlines Flight 893: A BAe Jetstream 41 registration 9N-AIB en route from Kathmandu to Bhairahawa overran the runway while landing at Gautam Buddha Airport. None of the 29 passengers or crew of three were hurt, but the aircraft was damaged beyond repair.
- 12 July 2019 – Yeti Airlines Flight 422: An ATR 72-500 (registration 9N-AMM) en route from Nepalgunj Airport to Tribhuvan International Airport suffered a runway excursion while landing. All 68 people on board, including the crew of four, evacuated the aircraft safely. Two of them received minor injuries and were taken to the hospital. A wet runway during the rainy season could have been the cause.
- 29 July 2022 – Yeti Airlines Flight 672: An ATR 72-500 (registration 9N-ANG) en route from the Pokhara International Airport to Tribhuvan International Airport with 45 people on board, was climbing out of Pokhara when the left hand engine (PW127) failed prompting the crew to shut the engine down and return to Pokhara for a safe landing about 6 minutes after departure. The airport reported the left hand engine failed immediately after the aircraft became airborne.
- 15 January 2023 – Yeti Airlines Flight 691: Yeti Airlines ATR 72-500 (registration 9N-ANC) en route from Tribhuvan International Airport to Pokhara International Airport crashed near Gharipatan, Pokhara. No one survived among the 68 passengers and four crew members on board, making it the deadliest plane crash in Nepal since 1992.
