= Chuhandanda =

Village development committee in Province No. 1, Nepal

Chuhandanda चुहानडाँडा
- Village development committee
- Location in Nepal
- Coordinates: 27.18°N 87.70°E
- Country: Nepal
- Province: Province No. 1
- District: Terhathum District

Population (1991)
  - Total: 3,987
- Time zone: UTC+5:45 (Nepal Time)

Chuhandanda is a village development committee in the Himalayas of Terhathum District in Province No. 1 of eastern Nepal. At the time of the 1991 Nepal census it had a population of 3987 people living in 703 individual households.
