= Rabindra Prasad Adhikari =

Nepali politician and parliamentarian (1969–2019)

- रबिन्द्र प्रसाद अधिकारी
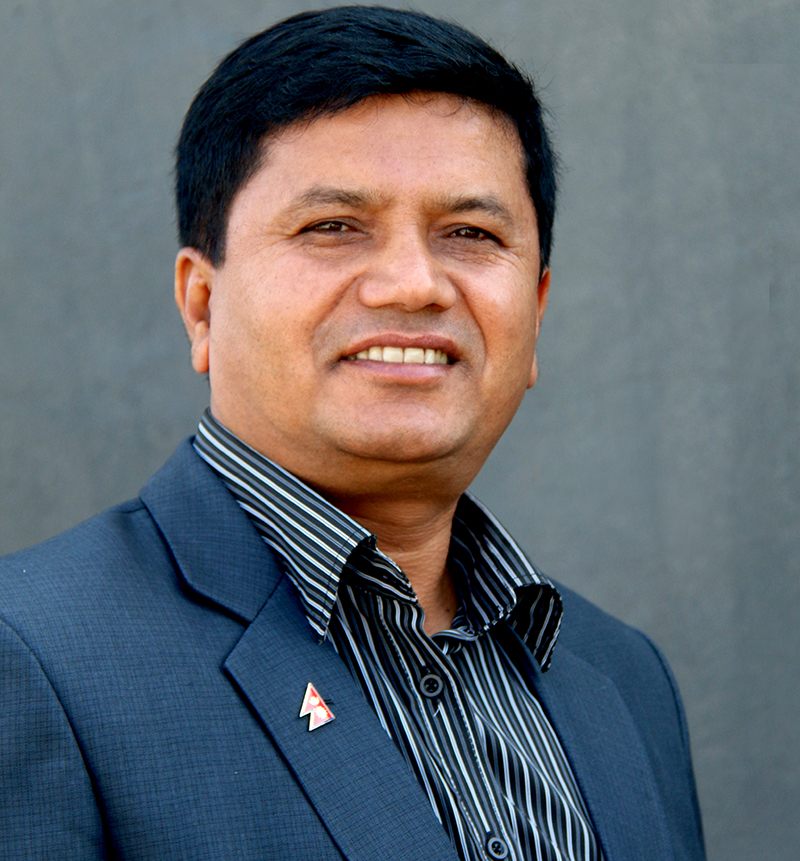

Minister of Culture, Tourism and Civil Aviation
- In office 16 March 2018 – 27 February 2019
- President: Bidhya Devi Bhandari
- Prime Minister: Khadga Prasad Oli
- Preceded by: Jitendra Narayan Dev
- Succeeded by: Yogesh Bhattarai

Personal details
- Born: 4 May 1969 Bharat Pokhari, Nepal
- Died: 27 February 2019 (aged 49) Taplejung, Nepal
- Citizenship: Nepali
- Party: Nepal Communist Party
- Spouse: Bidya Bhattarai
- Relations: Married
- Children: Biraj Adhikari, Sworaj Adhikari
- Parent(s): Indra Prasad Adhikari; Laxmi Devi Adhikari
- Education: Tribhuvan University
- Website: www.rabindrafoundation.org

Rabindra Prasad Adhikari (Nepali: रबिन्द्र प्रसाद अधिकारी) (4 May 1969 – 27 February 2019) was a Nepali politician and three-time parliamentarian, belonging to the Nepal Communist Party (NCP). He was Minister of Culture, Tourism and Civil Aviation from 16 March 2018 until his death in a helicopter crash in February 2019. He was the Kaski District secretary of the party. In the 2008 Constituent Assembly election, Adhikari was elected from the Kaski-3 constituency, with 13,386 votes. In the 2013 Constituent Assembly election, he was re-elected from the Kaski-3 constituency, with 15,456 votes. In 2017, CPN-UML candidate Rabindra Adhikari won parliamentary elections from Kaski Constituency No. 2. Representing the left alliance, Adhikari secured 27,207 votes to defeat Nepali Congress candidate Dev Raj Chalise, who got 18,661 votes. After his demise, his wife Bidya Bhattarai won Kaski Constituency-2 with a wide margin of 8,403 votes in the by-election. Bhattarai secured 24,394 votes, while her nearest contender Khem Raj Poudel from the main opposition Nepali Congress got 15,991. Socialist Party's Dharma Raj Gurung got 1,922 votes. He authored the books Constituent Assembly, Democracy and Re-structuring.

== Political career ==
He became president of Free Student Union of Prithivi Narayan Campus in 1993. He became national president of All Nepal National Free Students Union, the student wing of the communist party, in 1999.

He left CPN (UML) to join the breakaway Communist Party of Nepal (Marxist-Leninist) and rejoined following reunification.

After the 2nd Constituent Assembly Election, he became the chairman of the Development Committee of the Legislature Parliament.

== Electoral history ==
2017 House of Representatives Election, Kaski-2

Party	Candidate	Votes	Status
CPN-UML	Rabindra Prasad Adhikari	27,207	Elected
Nepali Congress	Dev Raj Chalise	18,661	Lost

2013 Constituent Assembly Election, Kaski-3

Party	Candidate	Votes	Status
CPN-UML	Rabindra Prasad Adhikari	13110	Elected
Nepali Congress	Soviet Bahadur Adhikari	10808	Lost

2008 Constituent Assembly Election, Kaski-3

Party	Candidate	Votes	Status
CPN-UML	Rabindra Prasad Adhikari	13386	Elected
CPN (Maoist)	Jhalak Pani Tiwari	10926	Lost

1999 House of Representatives Election, Kaski-1

Party	Candidate	Votes	Status
CPN-ML	Rabindra Prasad Adhikari	1752	Lost (4th)
Nepali Congress	Taranath Ranabhat	23939	Elected

== Corruption allegations ==
The subcommittee formed by the Public Accounts Committee of the House of Representatives to probe the Nepal Airlines wide body aircraft purchase concluded that he was complicit in corruption. He died while the matter was being investigated by the Commission for the Investigation of Abuse of Authority.

== Death ==
Rabindra Prasad Adhikari, along with six other people, died in a helicopter crash while returning from Pathibhara Devi Temple, Taplejung, Nepal, on 27 February 2019.
