= Pathibhara Devi Temple =

Temple in Nepal

Pathibhara Devi
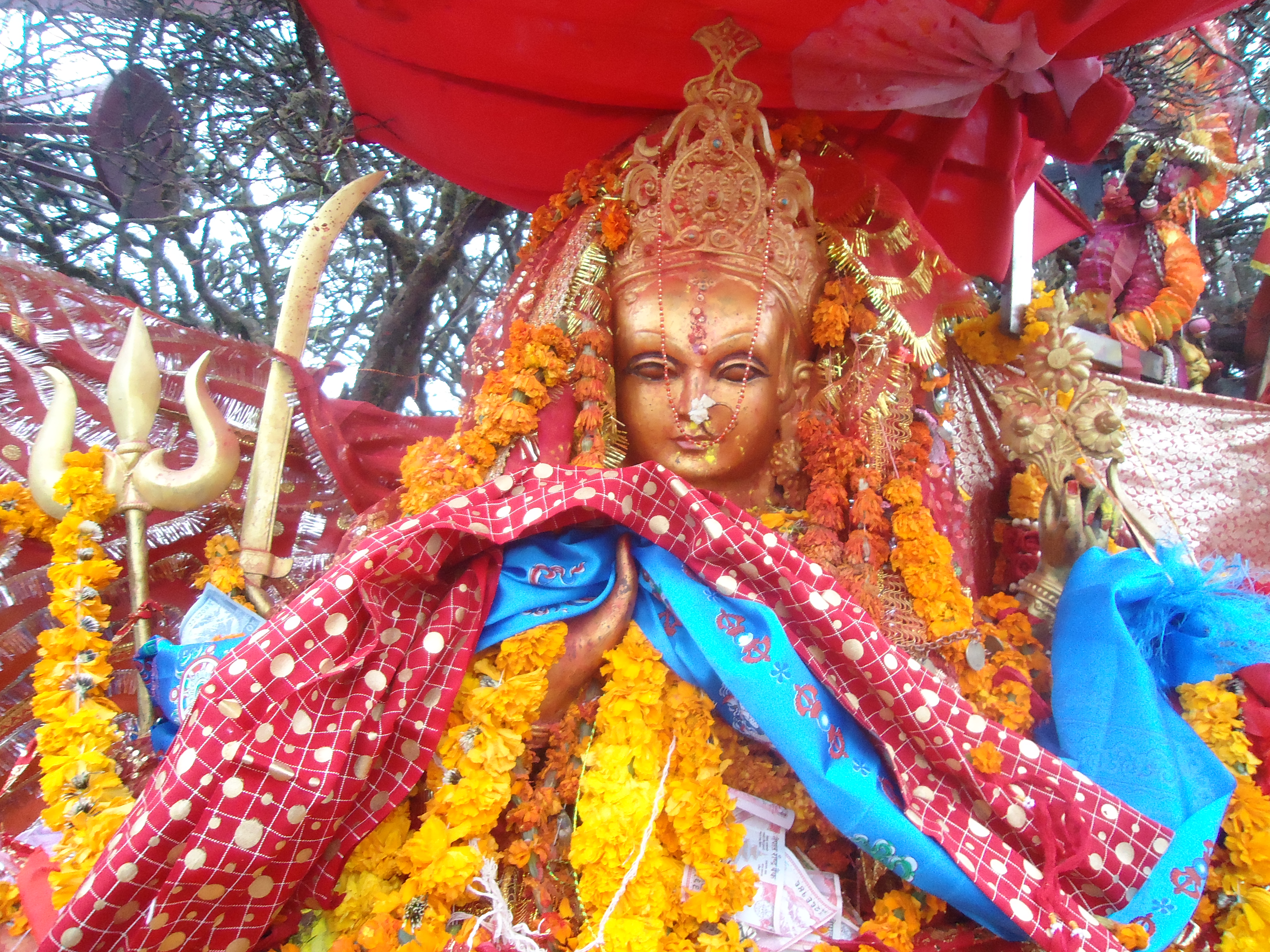
- Statue of Pathibhara Devi

- Location in Nepal(नेपाल)

Religion
- Affiliation: Hinduism & Kirat
- District: Taplejung
- Deity: Pathibhara Devi

Location
- Location: Taplejung
- Country: Nepal
- Interactive map of Pathibhara Devi
- Coordinates: 27°25′46″N 87°46′3.8″E

Architecture
- Type: Pagoda
- Elevation: 3,794 m (12,448 ft)

Pathibhara Devi/Mukumlung Temple (Nepali: पाथिभरा देवी मन्दिर) is one of the most significant Shaktipeeth in Nepal, located on the top hill of Taplejung mountains. It is also considered one of the holy places for the Nepalese people. Worshippers from different parts of Nepal and India visit the temple during special occasions, as it is believed that a pilgrimage to the temple ensures the fulfillment of the pilgrims' wishes.

The temple is located 19.4 North East from Phungling municipality at an elevation of 3,794 m (12,448 ft) (20448 feet above sea level and temperature around -2 to 1 degree Celsius). It serves as a secondary route of Kanchenjunga trek. The list of devotees includes the ex-Royal family of Nepal. The pilgrims offer animal sacrifices, gold and silver to please the goddess.

Pathibhara Temple is also a side route to the Kanchenjunga Base Camp Trek.

== Legend ==
It is believed that local shepherds lost hundreds of their sheep while grazing at the same place where the temple stands today. The distressed shepherds had a dream in which the goddess ordered them to carry out ritualistic sacrifice of sheep and build a shrine in her honour. When the sacrifice was offered, the lost herd suddenly returned. The ritual of offering sacrifices inside the temple is believed to have started after the incident.

The hill goddess Pathibhara(पाथिभारा) after which the place is named is believed by the devotees to be a fierce goddess who can be easily pleased with simple and selfless act of compassion, prayer and sacrificial offerings, while is unmerciful and severe to one who has malicious intentions beneath.

She answers prayers and is very important to all people residing in Nepal. The Goddess at Pathibhara is believed to fulfil the long-cherished dreams of her devotees, like sons for those without sons, and wealth for the poor.

Pathibhara is also one of the 'Shakti Peeths'. Shakti Peethas are the places where parts of Goddess Sati had fallen while Lord Shiva was carrying her dead body. Worshippers from different parts of Nepal and India visit the temple during special occasions, as it is believed that a pilgrimage to the temple ensures fulfilment of all that the pilgrim desires

== History ==
Long before the Pathibhara temple was built, there was a large rock at the hilltop that the Limbu people deeply revered, believing it to hold divine power. The Limbus, who follow Mundhum—an ancient tradition rooted in animism and shamanism—see the rock and the entire Mukkumlung hill as a natural form of their goddess, Yuma Sammang. For Hindus, the same rock was considered a symbol of Goddess Durga.

In 1995, the Pathibhara Area Development Committee was formed. Eventually, in 2001, under the committee’s direction, the sacred rock was replaced with a statue of Goddess Durga.

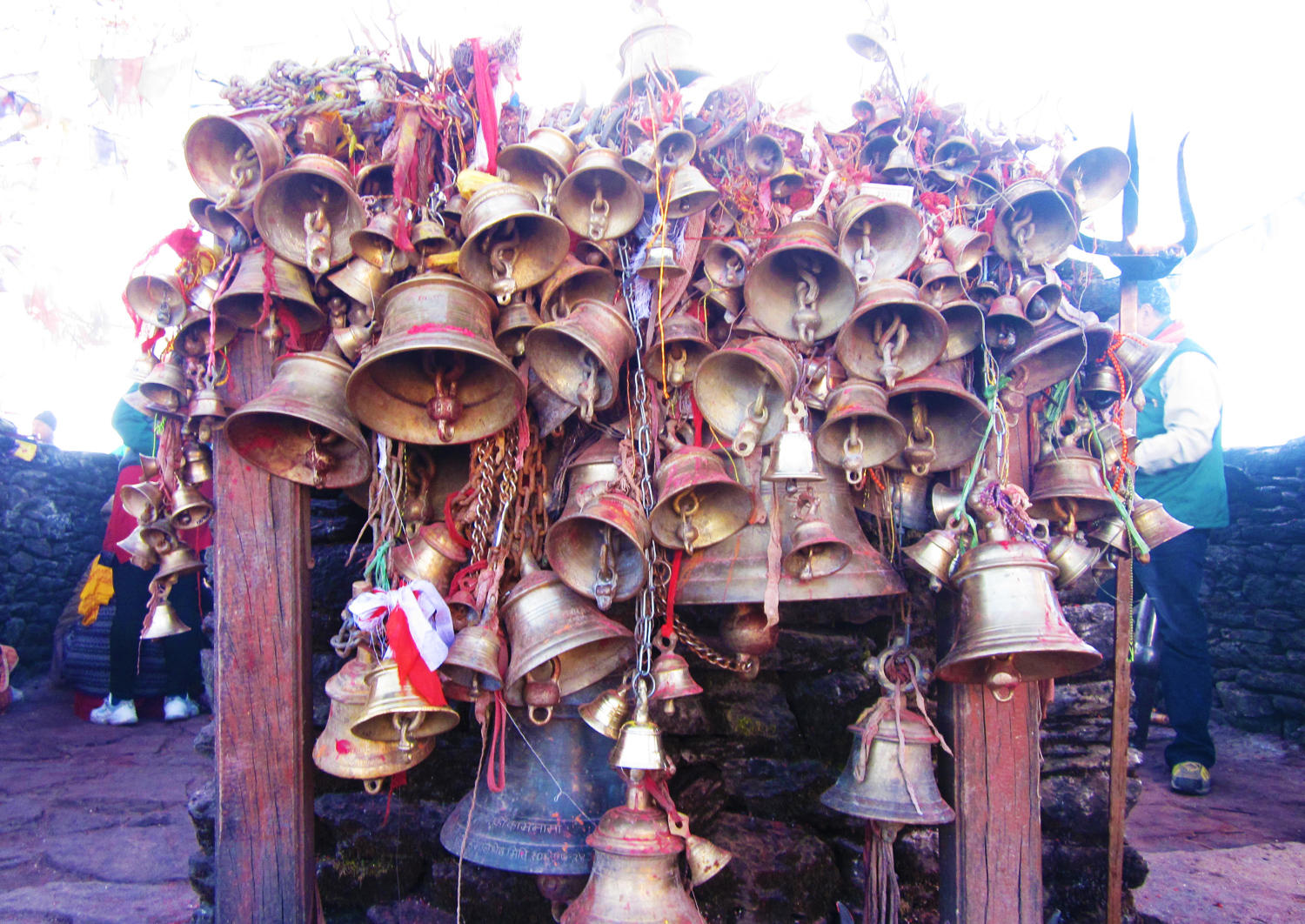
Temple Bells at Pathibhara

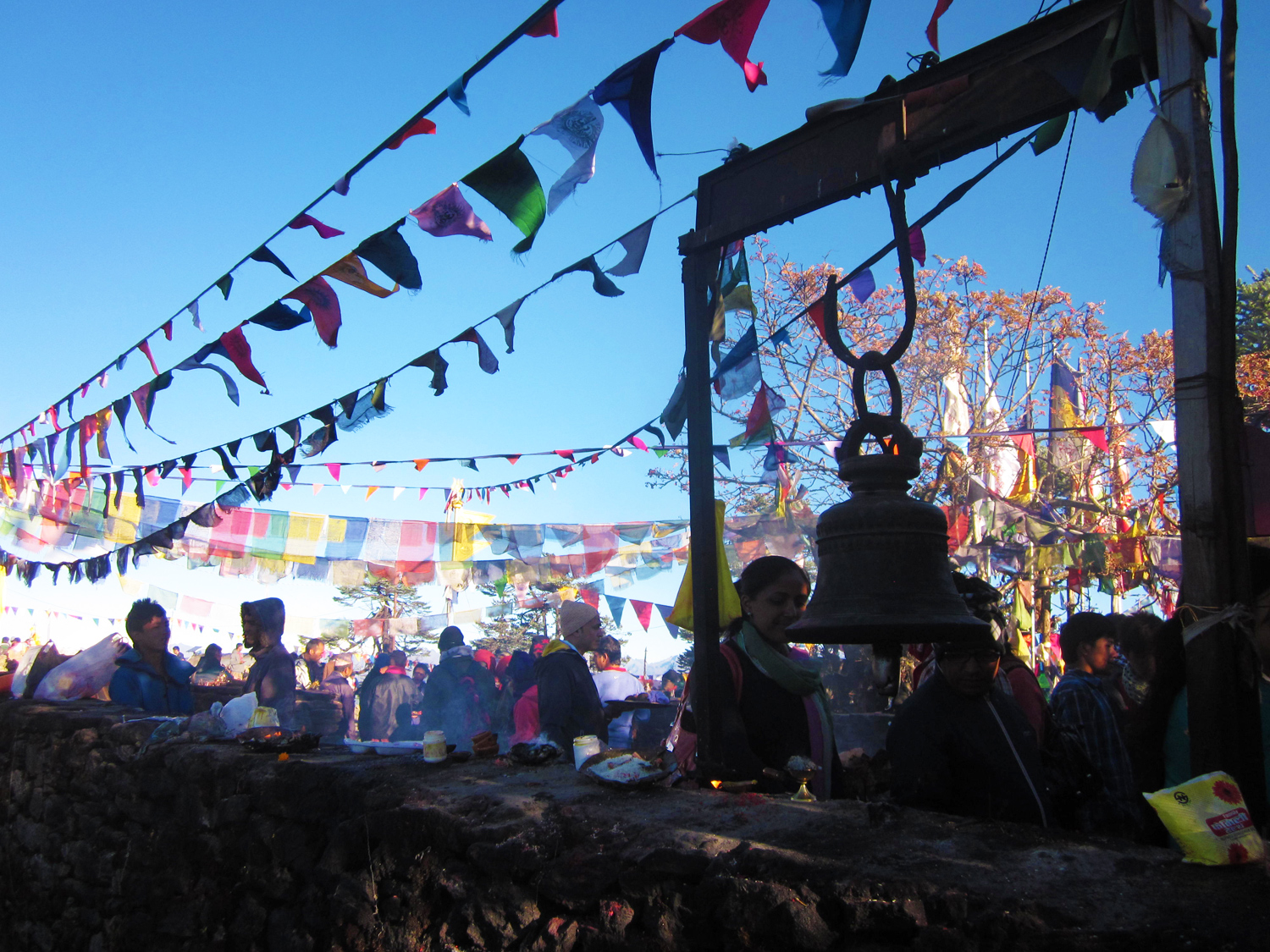
Huge bell inside Pathibhara Temple premises

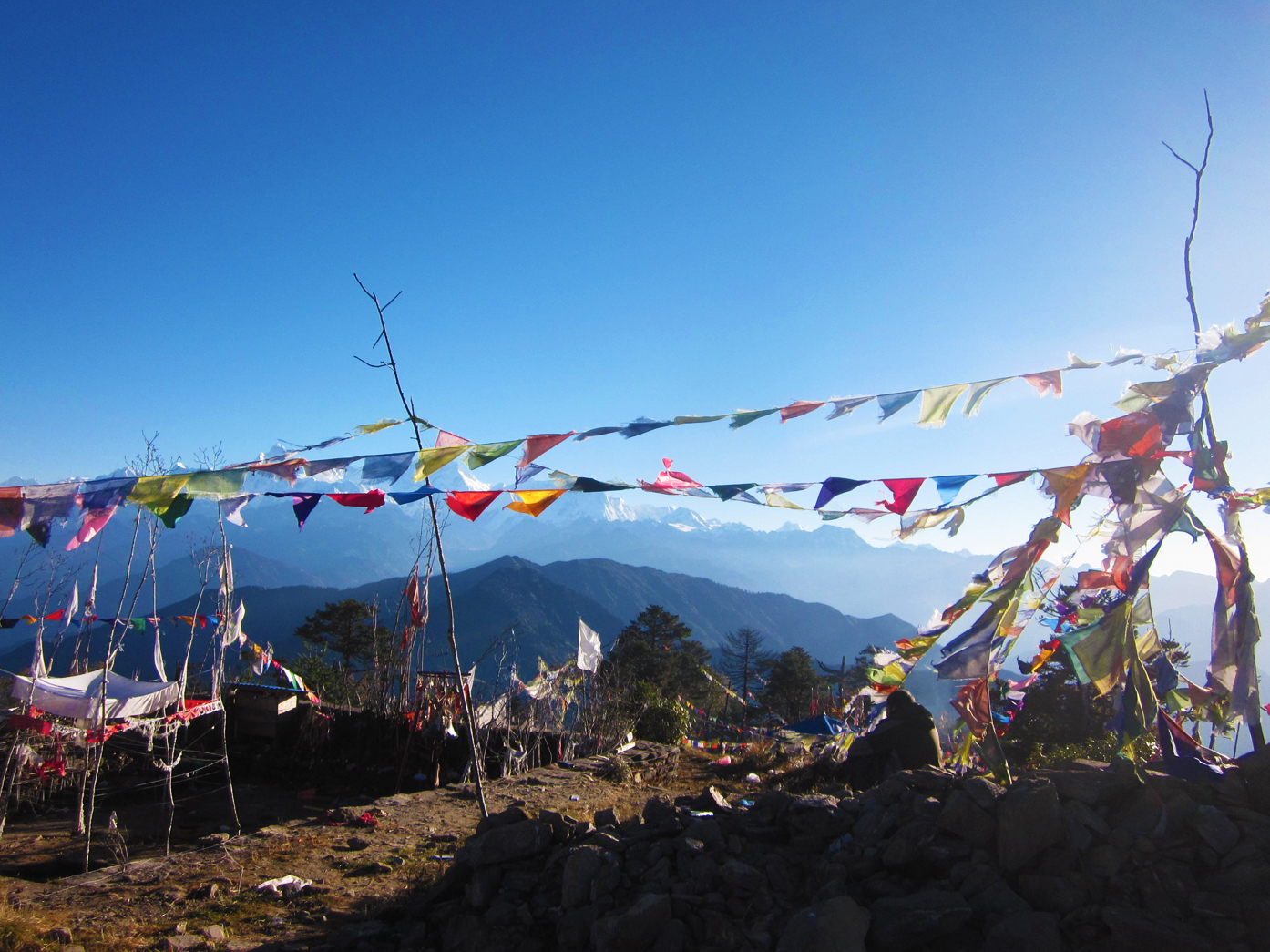
Buddhist prayer flags fluttering inside Pathibhara Devi Temple premises
