= Simrik Air =

Nepalese helicopter airline

IATA	ICAO	Call sign
—	—	—
- Founded: 2001; 25 years ago
- AOC #: 034/2000
- Hubs: Kathmandu
- Secondary hubs: Pokhara Airport
- Fleet size: 5
- Headquarters: Kathmandu, Nepal
- Website: www.simrikair.com

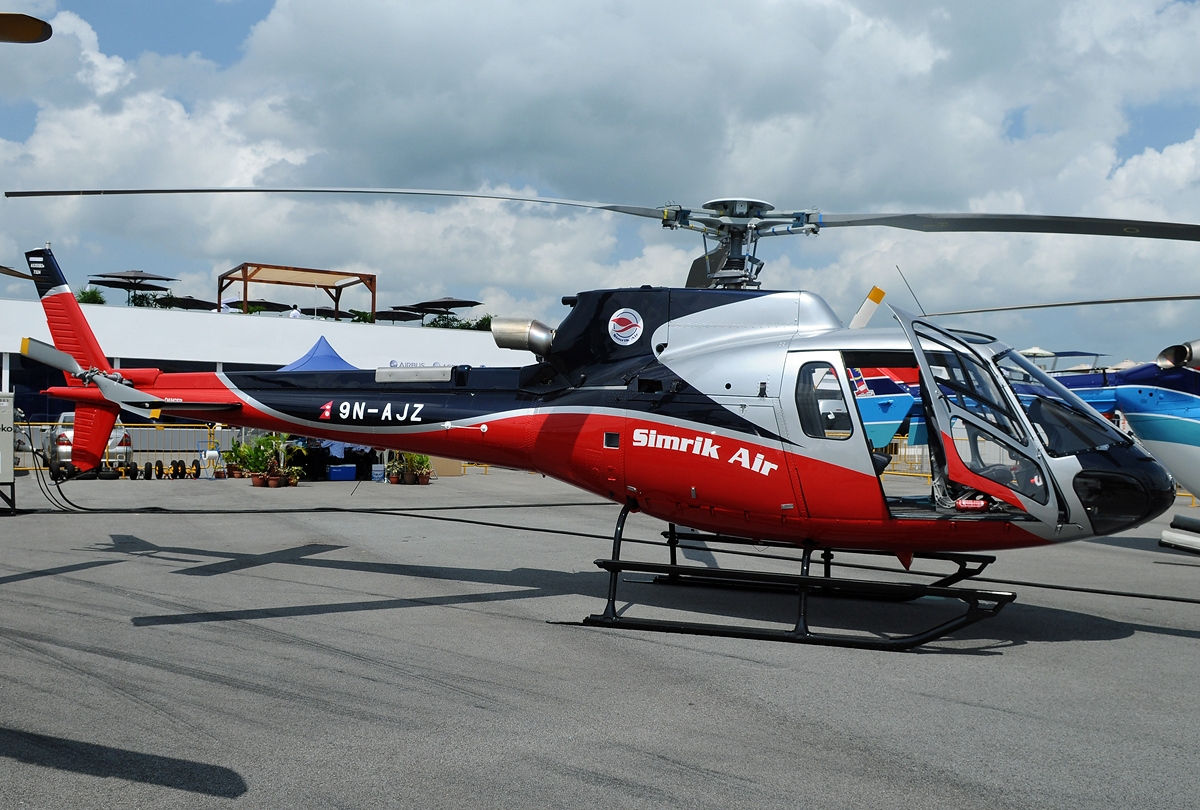
A Eurocopter AS 350 of Simrik Air

Simrik Air Pvt. Ltd. is a helicopter airline based at Tribhuvan International Airport in Kathmandu, Nepal. It operates chartered helicopter services. The company was established in 2001. It was a partner of Simrik Airlines, which operates scheduled fixed-wing services, until latter airline was rebranded as Guna Airlines in 2021. Simrik Air also partners with Swiss helicopter operator Air Zermatt, which helps with pilot training.

Simrik Air, has added a new Bell 505 Jet Ranger X helicopter to its fleet. The helicopter, which has serial number 65430, was signed for in Singapore on March 20, 2023. It is the latest and most successful model of the Bell Jet Ranger helicopter, and is equipped with advanced avionics and safety features. It is banned from flying into EU airspace.

== Fleet ==
=== Current fleet ===
The Simrik Air fleet consists of the following aircraft (as of March 2023):

Simrik Air fleet
Aircraft	In Fleet	Orders	Passengers			Notes
Aircraft	In Fleet	Orders	C	Y	Total	Notes
Eurocopter AS350 B3e	4	0	0	5	5	
Bell 407 GXP	1	0	0	5	5	
Bell 505 Jet Ranger X	1	1	0	4	4	
Total	6	2				

== Accidents and incidents ==
- 28 May 2003 - A Simrik Air Mil Mi-8MTV-1 crashed while approaching Everest Base Camp. Two passengers were killed and nine injured.
- 23 November 2006 - A Simrik Air Mil Mi-8MTV-1 crashed during an emergency landing in Jumla District.
- 22 June 2015 - A Simrik Air Eurocopter AS 350 caught fire after a bird strike in Gorkha District and had to make an emergency landing. All five persons on board were reported to be safe.
- 30 June 2018 - A Simrik Air Eurocopter AS 350 crashed during a landing at Grande International Hospital in Kathmandu. No passenger was harmed, however the video of which went viral.
- 5 May 2023 - A Simrik Air 9N-AJZ helicopter with four passengers onboard in the command of Captain Surendra Paudel was crashed in Bhotkhola Rural Municipality -4, sankhuwasabha. There were four passengers and one pilot onboard. One passenger was reported dead, while four other were injured.
