= Simrik Airlines =

Airline based in Kathmandu, Nepal

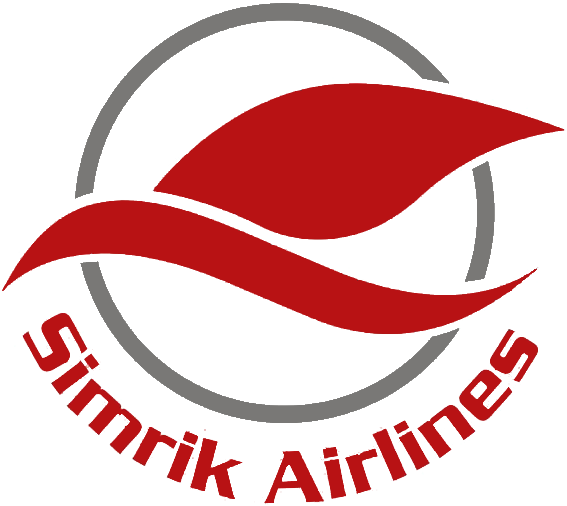
IATA	ICAO	Call sign
–	RMK	–
- Founded: 2009
- Ceased operations: 2021
- AOC #: 052/2009
- Hubs: Kathmandu
- Fleet size: 5
- Destinations: 3
- Headquarters: Kathmandu, Nepal
- Website: www.simrikairlines.com

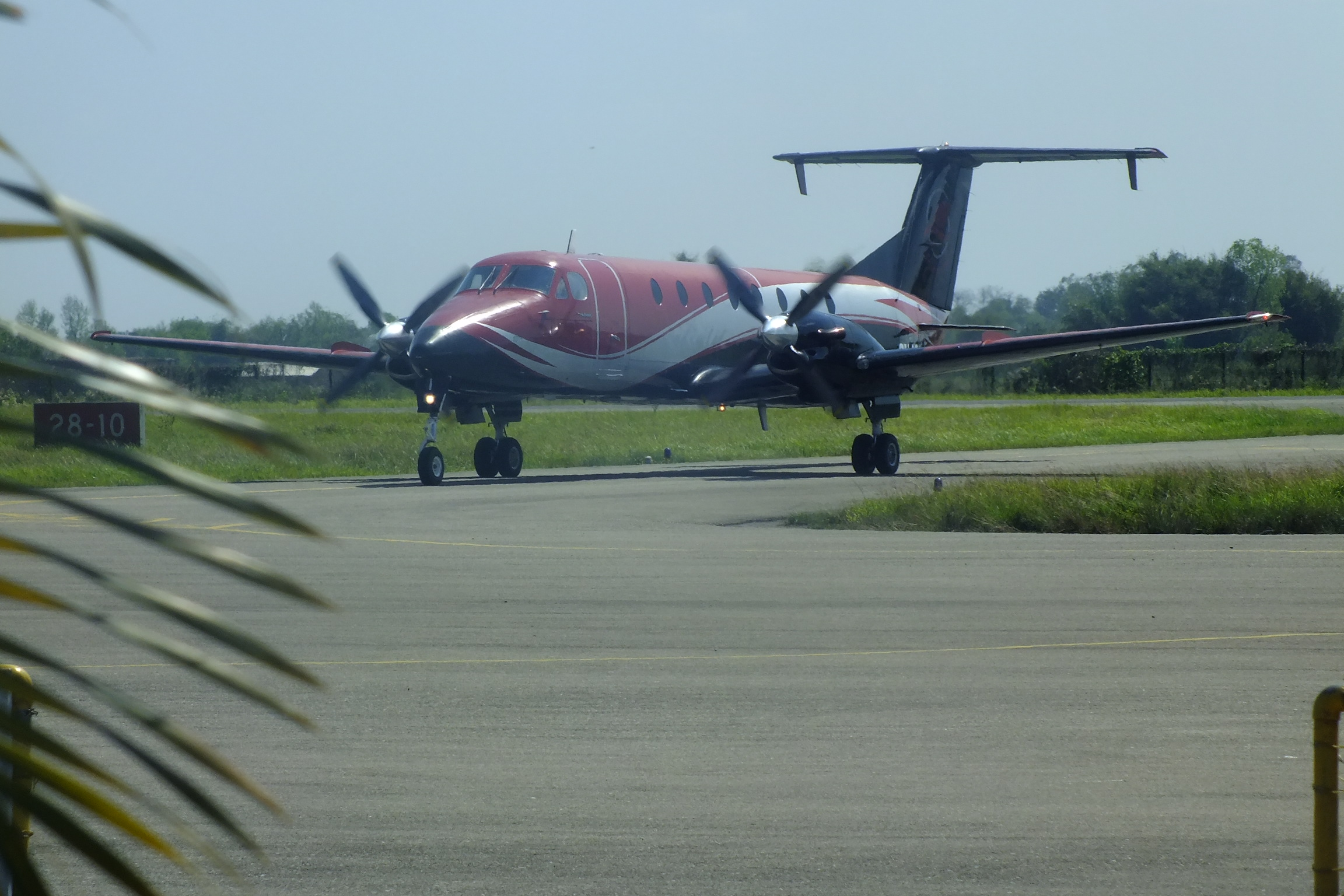
Simrik Airlines Beechcraft 1900 at Gautam Buddha Airport (March 2015)

Simrik Airlines Pvt. Ltd. was an airline based in Kathmandu, Nepal operating domestic scheduled flights from its base at Tribhuvan International Airport. It was the partner company of Simrik Air, a Nepalese helicopter airline operating four helicopters. It ceased operations in 2021, when it was rebranded as Guna Airlines.

== History ==
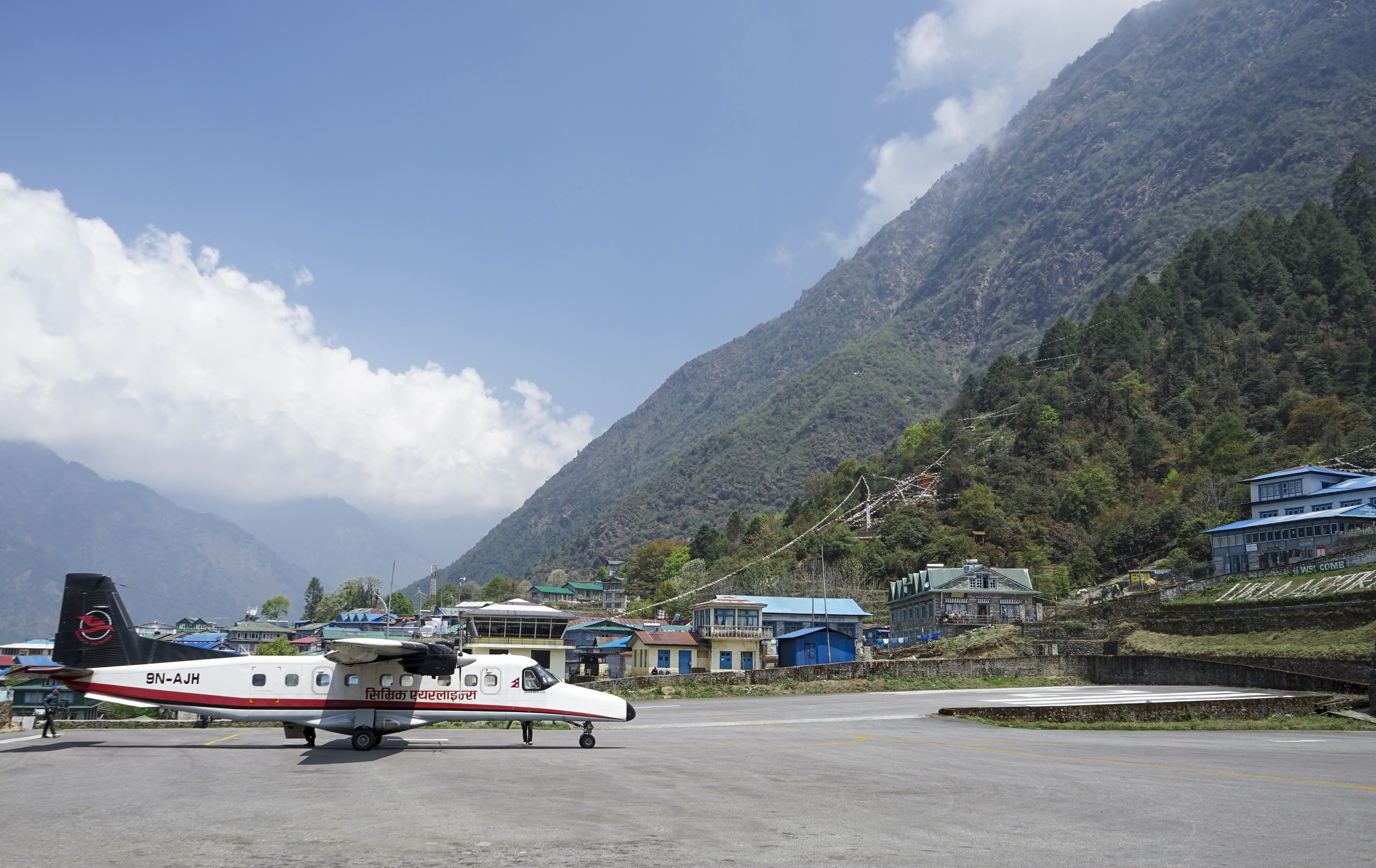
Simrik Airlines Dornier 228 at Lukla Airport

The airline was founded in 2009 from the remainders of ill-fated Guna Airlines, which it acquired for NRs 350 million, after latter ceased trading due to financial difficulties. Simrik Airlines used the Brand of Guna for some more time before renaming and repainting the two Beechcraft 1900 aircraft, that were previously operated by Guna Airlines. On 23 October 2013, Simrik Airlines signed a contract with Agni Air leasing five aircraft of Agni Air, three BAe Jetstream 41 and two Dornier 228, after the airline's planes had been grounded since mid-November 2012, as the airline was affected by severe debts. After selling the two Dornier 228s in mid-2017, Simrik Airlines was left with only two functioning planes, as the Jetstream planes of former Agni Air continued to be grounded.

In August 2019, Simrik Airlines was forced to halt operations by the Civil Aviation Authority of Nepal, who found that the airline was using "substandard spare parts". One month later, the Civil Aviation Authority granted flight permission again.

In 2020, first reports appeared stating that Guna Airlines would be reestablished, discontinuing the brand Simrik Airlines. In early 2021, the airline announced that it would buy five BAe Jetstream 41 from Yeti Airlines to restart operation under the brand name Guna Airlines, discontinuing Simrik Airlines.

On 16 September 2021, operations of Guna Air began again with regular flights from Kathmandu to Pokhara and Bharatpur, discontinuing the brand Simrik Airlines.

== Destinations ==
Simrik Airlines operated flights to the three destinations from Kathmandu Airport at the time of closure in 2021:

Destination	Airport	Notes
Bhairahawa	Gautam Buddha Airport	
Bharatpur	Bharatpur Airport	
Jomsom	Jomsom Airport	Terminated
Kathmandu	Tribhuvan International Airport	Hub
Lukla	Tenzing-Hillary Airport	Terminated
Pokhara	Pokhara Airport	
Simara	Simara Airport	Terminated
Simikot	Simikot Airport	Terminated
Tumlingtar	Tumlingtar Airport	Terminated

The airline also offered daily sightseeing mountain flights from Kathmandu. The flights departed in the early morning hours and returned to the airport one hour later.

== Fleet ==
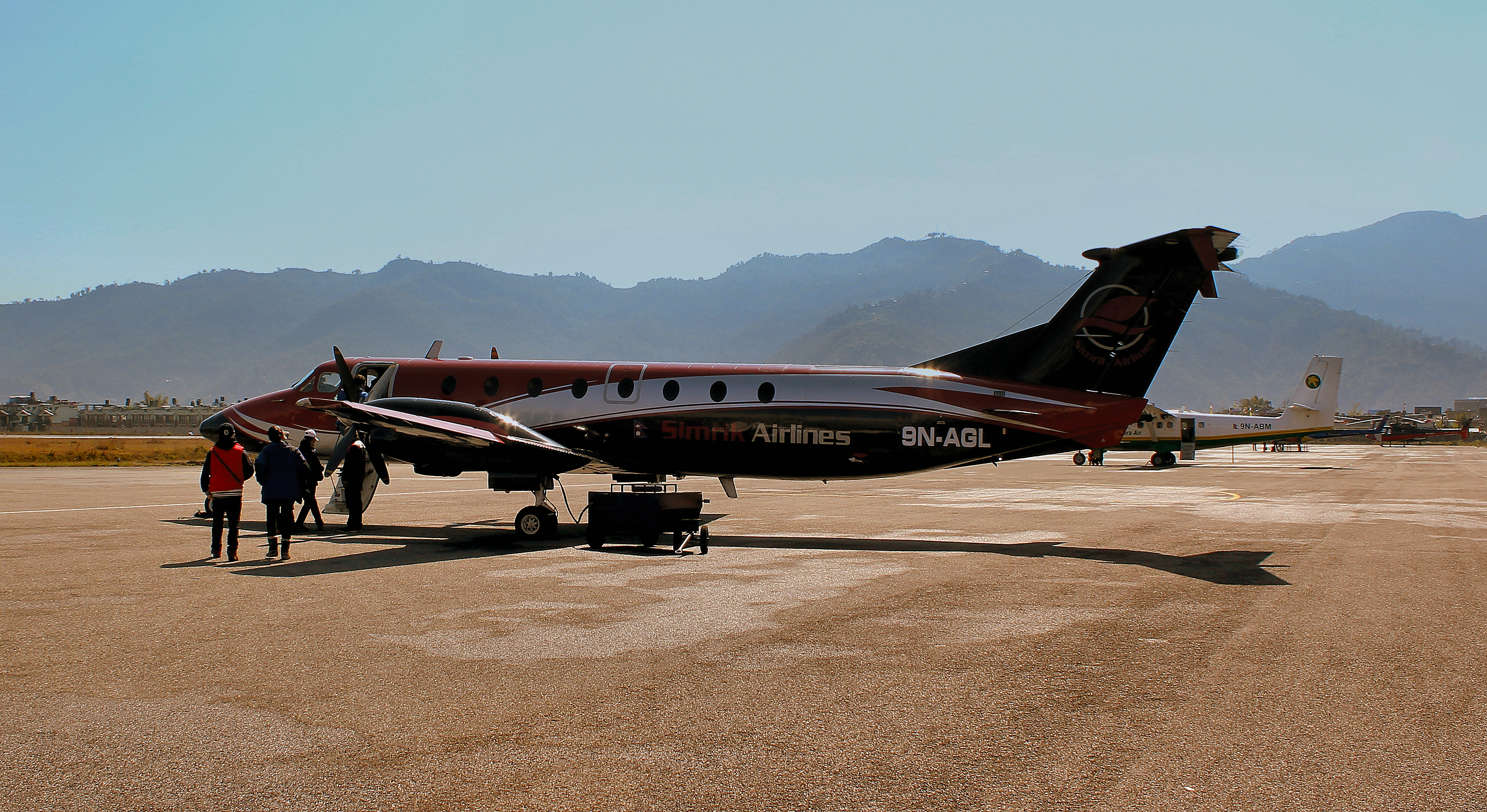
Simrik Airlines Beechcraft 1900 at Pokhara Airport (February 2013)

At the time of closure, Simrik Airlines operated the following aircraft:

Simrik Airlines fleet
Aircraft	In Fleet	Orders	Passengers			Notes
Aircraft	In Fleet	Orders	C	Y	Total	Notes
Beechcraft 1900C	2	0	0	18	18	Acquired from Guna Airlines
BAe Jetstream 41	3	0	0	29	29	Continuously Grounded
Total	5	0

Simrik Airlines Former Fleet
Aircraft (in Fleet)	Introduction	Exit from service	Notes
Dornier 228 (2)	2013	2017	Leased from Agni Air, sold to Sita Air

== Accidents and incidents ==
- On April 10, 2015, the nose wheel tyre of the landing gear of a Simrik Airlines Dornier 228 was punctured upon landing at Lukla Airport. There were no casualties reported. The incident occurred at 10:00 am and the runway was reopened at 1:00 pm.
