= Nepflights.com =

Nepflights
- Founded: 2014; 12 years ago
- Headquarters: Kathmandu, {{{location_country}}}
- Area served: Nepal
- Industry: Travel website Flight search engine
- Website: www.nepflights.com
- Launched: April 24, 2014 (alpha)

Nepflights is an online API-based domestic flight booking platform for Nepal and was established in 2014. The company has five airlines: Buddha Air, Saurya Airlines, Simrik Airlines, Tara Air, and Yeti Airlines; four payment partners: eSewa, Ipay, PayPal, and NIBL; and 25 destinations.

In 2015, Nepflights won the 'Red Herring Top 100 Asia' award.
