= Agni Air =

Nepalese airline

Agni Air अग्नि एयर
IATA	ICAO	Call sign
AG (Note: Agni Air had no registered IATA code allocated, but used 'AG' on scheduling, ticketing and baggage (as an official IATA code would be used). However, officially, the IATA Code 'AG' is allocated to Aruba Airlines.)	-	Agni
- Founded: 2006
- Ceased operations: 2013; 13 years ago
- AOC #: 039/2005
- Hubs: Tribhuvan International Airport
- Secondary hubs: Tenzing-Hillary Airport
- Fleet size: 6 (at closure)
- Destinations: 8 (at closure)
- Headquarters: Kathmandu, Nepal
- Key people: Sudhir Basnyat (chairman)

Agni Air Pvt. Ltd. (Nepali: अग्नि एयर प्रा. ली.) was an airline based in Kathmandu, operating domestic services within Nepal. It started operations in March 2006. The airline ceased operations in November 2013.

== History ==
Agni Air, named after the Sanskrit word, commenced operations on 16 March 2006 by connecting Kathmandu to Lukla and Tumlingtar using a single Dornier 228 and started flying to Biratnagar the next day. The Civil Aviation Authority of Nepal granted Agni Air an air operators certificate, allowing it to operate scheduled flights, as well as mountain flights.

The airline's corporate design, the logo and the slogan fly the friendly sky was developed by Christian Kracht and Eckhart Nickel after an invitation of tender in 2005. They claim to have never received the 500 Euro royalty.

In 2013, following two accidents and financial difficulties, the airline was taken over by Namaste Air, a Nepalese start-up carrier, which itself never started operations. Upon Agni Air's closure, the remaining aircraft were leased out to Simrik Airlines.

== Destinations ==
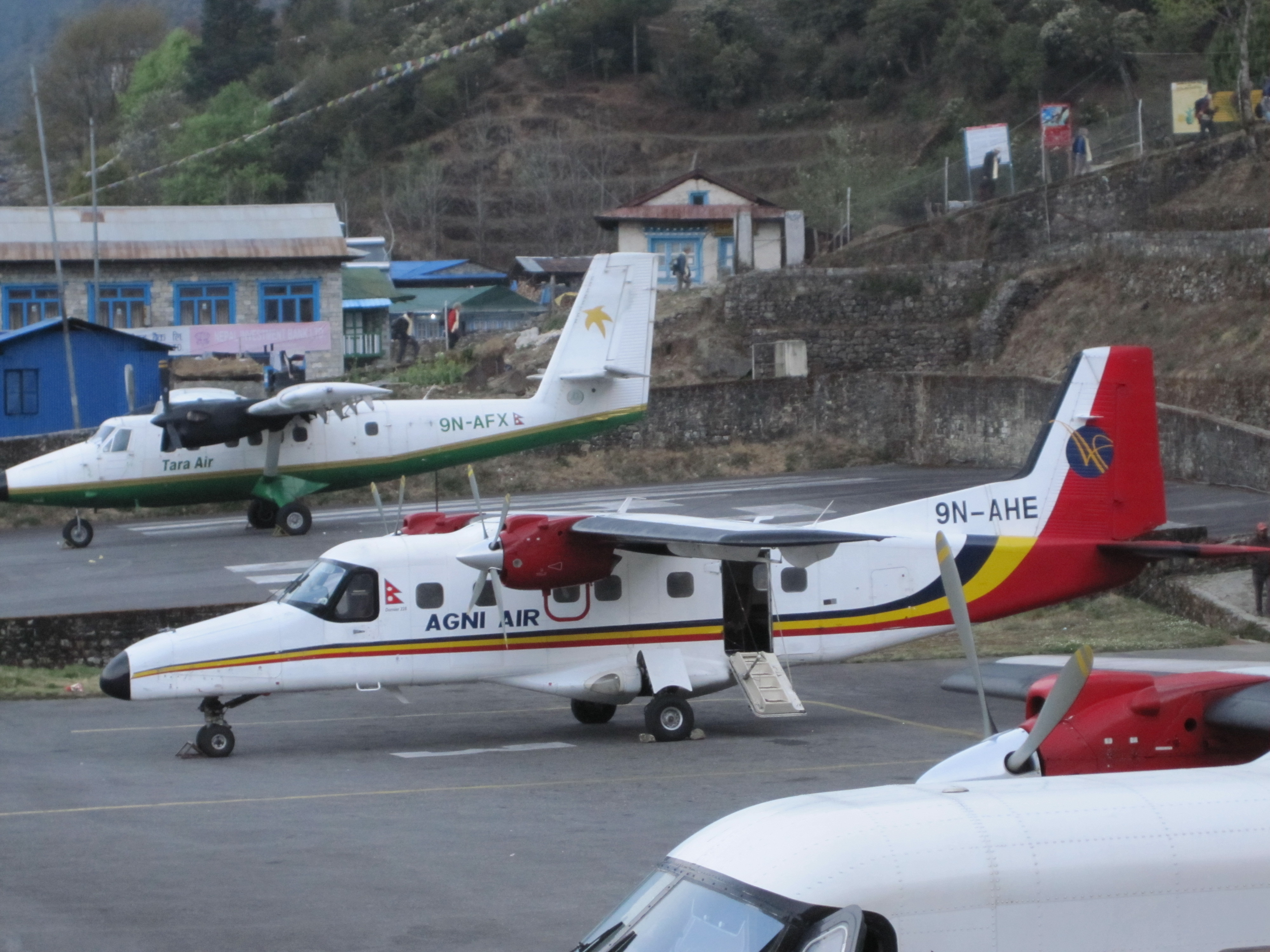
Agni Air Dornier 228 at Lukla Airport (April 2010)

Agni Air regularly served the following destinations, which were cancelled either at the closure of operations or before:

City	Airport	Notes	Refs
Bhadrapur	Bhadrapur Airport		
Bhairahawa	Gautam Buddha Airport		
Biratnagar	Biratnagar Airport		
Jomsom	Jomsom Airport		
Kathmandu	Tribhuvan International Airport	Hub	
Lukla	Tenzing–Hillary Airport		
Pokhara	Pokhara Airport		
Tumlingtar	Tumlingtar Airport		

== Fleet ==
At the time of closure, Agni Air operated the following aircraft:

Agni Air Fleet
Aircraft	In fleet	Notes
Dornier 228	3	
Jetstream 41	3	

== Accidents and incidents ==
- On 24 August 2010, Agni Air Flight 101, a Dornier 228, crashed after the crew decided to return and to divert to Simara Airport (VNSI/SIF) due to poor weather conditions at Kathmandu. News reports indicate that the airplane suffered a generator failure and ATC contact was lost around 7:30 am LT. 14 including 6 foreigners killed.
- On 14 May 2012, a Dornier 228 en route to Jomsom airport, crashed 125 miles from its original location in Kathmandu, killing 15 of the 21 people on board.
