= South Phoenix Airlines =

Philippine airline

IATA	ICAO	Call sign
—	—	AIR REPUBLIQ
- Founded: 2010
- Hubs: Ninoy Aquino International Airport
- Subsidiaries: Air Republiq (100%)
- Fleet size: 10
- Destinations: Manila; El Nido; Busuanga; Puerto Princesa; Basco; Itbayat; Tuguegarao; Laoag
- Headquarters: Manila
- Key people: Capt. Ramil B. Rivera (President and CEO)
- Website: www.southphoenixairways.com

South Phoenix Airlines is an airline operating in the Philippines. The airline was formerly known as South Phoenix Airways. The company is based in Manila and mainly provides charter flights to different destinations and also operates non-scheduled services. Plans to start flights with a BAe Jetstream 41 are also ongoing.

The company also started a subsidiary named Air Republiq to cater the islands of Batanes, linking them to different major cities of Luzon. It uses the Piper Navajo for this purpose.

The low-cost carrier is a joint venture between Malaysian and Filipino investors.

Plans to start direct flights to Manila from Basco are also underway.

== Destinations ==
- Manila
- El Nido
- Busuanga
- Puerto Princesa
- Basco
- Itbayat
- Tuguegarao
- Laoag

== Fleet ==
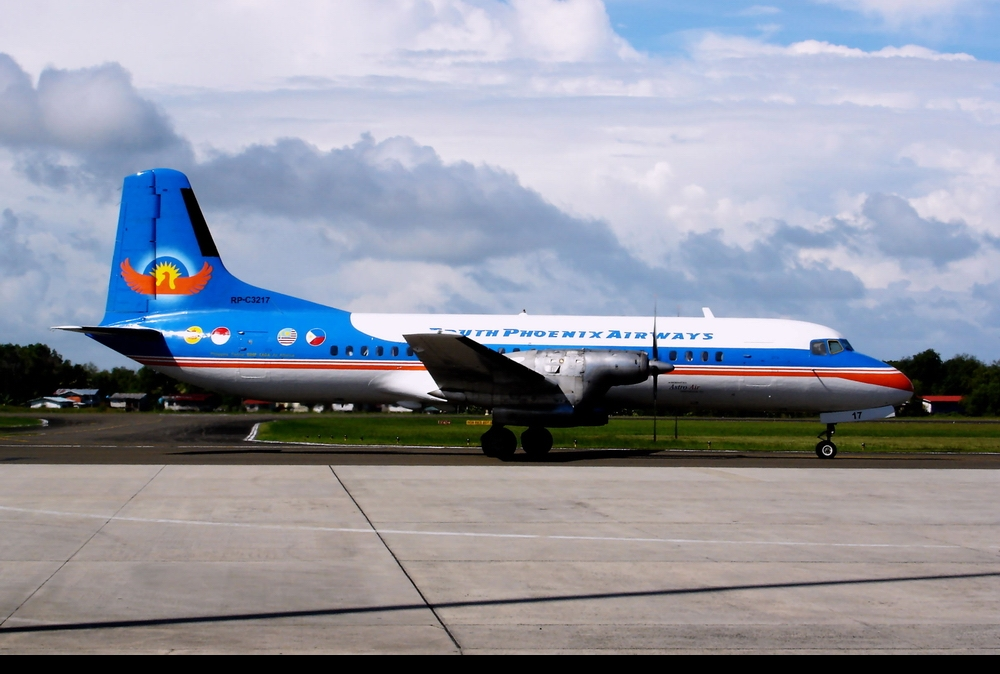
South Phoenix Airways NAMC YS-11A-500

- 1 Beechcraft Queen Air (retired)
- 1 Beechcraft King Air B200
- 1 Cessna 172 (retired)
- 1 Cessna Citation
- 1 Cessna 421
- 1 BAe Jetstream 41
- 1 NAMC YS-11 24-seater commuter-configured
- 3 NAMC YS-11 60-seater commuter-configured
- 2 Piper PA-31-30 Navajo Chieftain (painted in Air Republiq livery)
