= Independence Air =

Low-cost airline of the United States (2003–2006)

IATA	ICAO	Call sign
DH	IDE	INDEPENDENCE
- Founded: November 19, 2003
- Commenced operations: August 4, 2004
- Ceased operations: January 5, 2006
- Operating bases: Dulles International Airport
- Frequent-flyer program: iCLUB
- Fleet size: 130
- Destinations: 37
- Parent company: FLYi, Inc.
- Headquarters: Loudoun Gateway Corporate Center, Dulles, Virginia, U.S.
- Key people: Kerry Skeen (CEO)
- Website: www.flyi.com

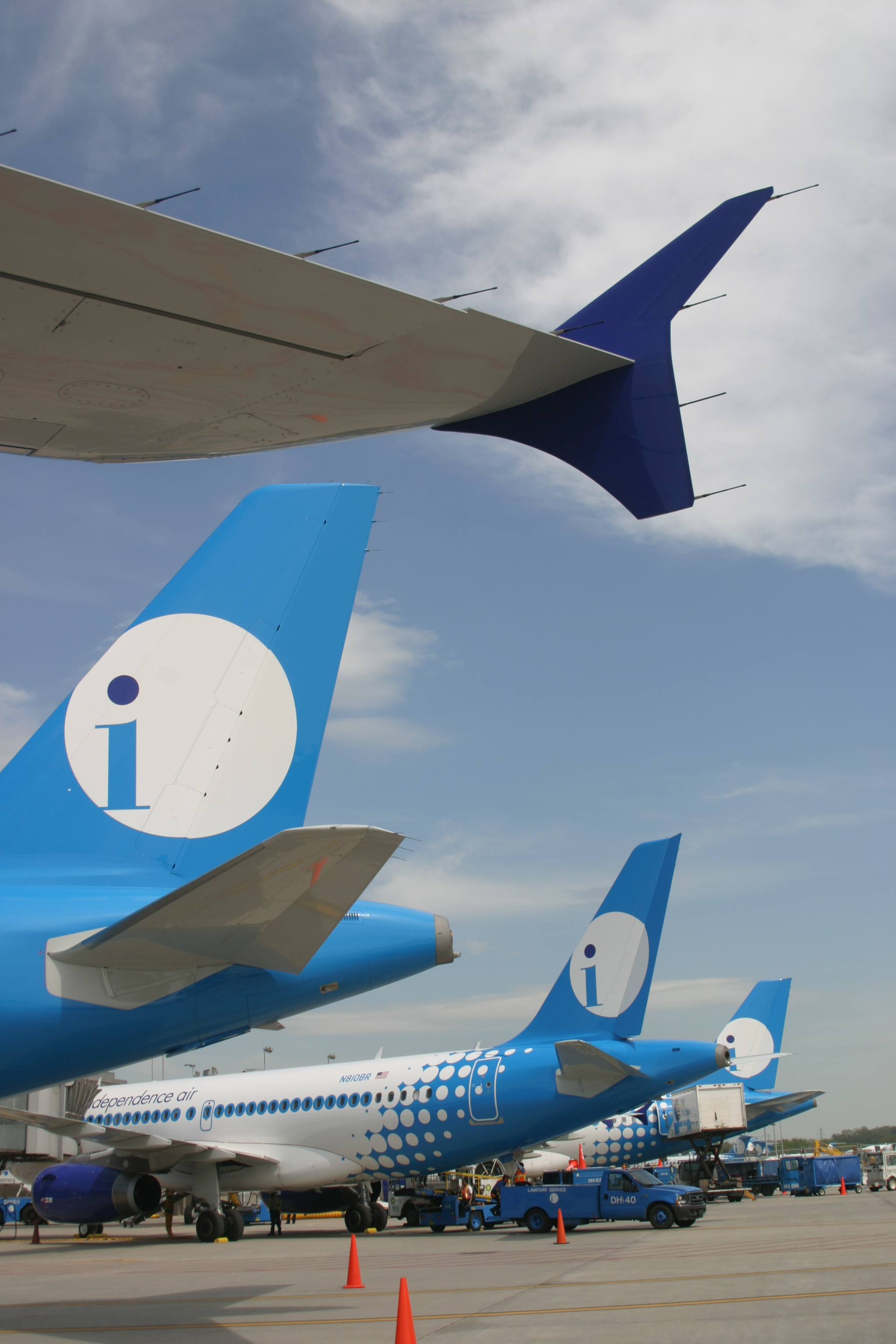
A319s, Washington Dulles Airport, April 2005

Independence Air was a short-lived low-cost airline, owned by FLYi, Inc., headquartered in the Loudoun Gateway Corporate Center in Dulles, Virginia, United States (near Washington, D.C.) that operated from 2003 until 2006. Its route network focused on the east coast of the United States, but it also extended to the west coast. The route network was based at Washington Dulles International Airport.

It ceased all operations at 20:24 UTC-5 on January 5, 2006. The airline had been in Chapter 11 bankruptcy since November 7, 2005.

== History ==
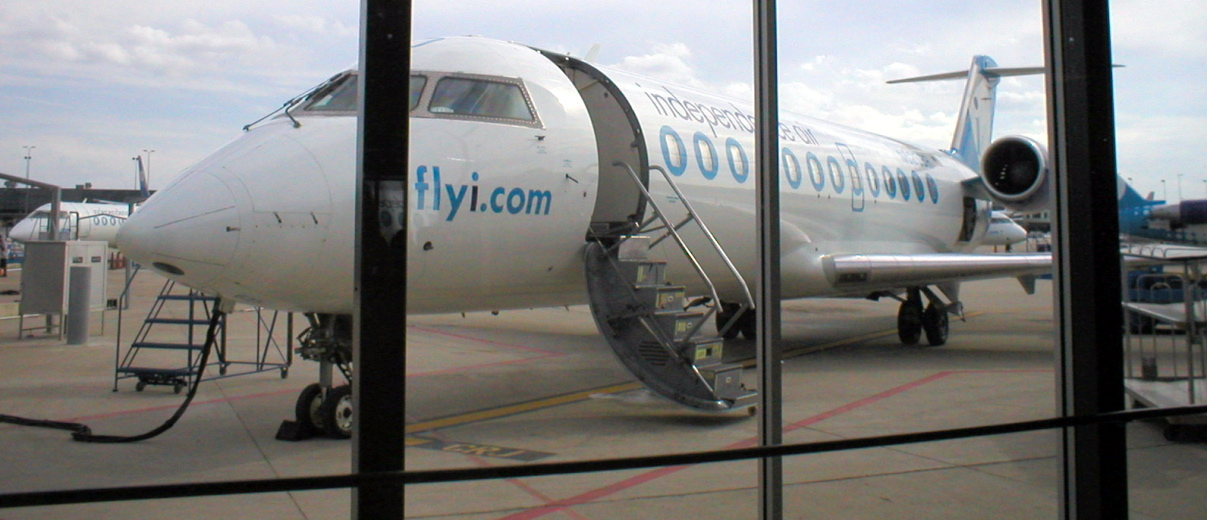
A regional jet operated by Independence Air, seen through terminal windows

Independence Air started life as Atlantic Coast Airlines on December 15, 1989, operating feeder services as United Express for United Airlines and Delta Connection for Delta Air Lines. United, in Chapter 11 bankruptcy, withdrew the contract when the ACA labor and management would not agree to the concessions it requested, Atlantic Coast reinvented itself as low-cost carrier Independence Air. It was announced on November 19, 2003, and operations as Independence Air began on June 16, 2004. At its inception, it was unique among low-cost carriers in that its fleet mainly consisted of 50-seat regional jets, although the airline later introduced larger Airbus A319 equipment. It was based at Washington Dulles International Airport (IAD) and contributed to Dulles' substantial increase in passenger use, bringing one million new customers to the airport in its first three months of operation. The airline was also credited with helping to reduce fares to and from the airport, and it took time after the airline's shutdown for the traffic volume to recover.

=== Criticism ===
From the beginning, the airline faced criticism including that it expanded too quickly, had a poor fleet mix and did not have the resources to compete with the legacy airlines, who despite their own financial troubles, would match the fares offered by Independence. Further, industry experts believed that the reasons behind the airline's failure were not problems with the low-cost strategy, but miscues on the part of airline management. Atlantic Coast's / Independence Air's former partner at Dulles, United Airlines, responded vigorously to Independence Air's emergence as a stand-alone carrier by leveraging Washington area passenger loyalty to the United Mileage Plus frequent flyer program. United offered its Mileage Plus members substantial bonuses, including free trips around the world on United and other Star Alliance carriers; these proved effective in maintaining United's grip on the lucrative business travel market, and Independence Air could not respond to United's promotional onslaught. (United's primary offer for free flights based on a sliding scale of flight segments to/from a Washington airport - IAD, DCA, BWI. 24 segments yielded a United coach ticket, 48 segments yielded a Star Alliance round-the-world business class ticket.) Problems, including flights flying far below capacity, were identified in October 2004, less than six months following the airline's launch as the parent company attempted to avoid bankruptcy.

=== Promotional activities ===
On May 20, 2004, even prior to its inaugural flight, Independence Air signed a deal with the Washington Redskins to become the official airline sponsor of the team for three years. In the summer of 2005, the airline offered college students the GLiDE Summer Travel Pass. This move was meant not to bring in revenue, but to try to fill seats that otherwise would have flown empty. This promotional tool was not enough to prevent trouble, due in part to the airline losing almost $150 million in its two years of operation.

Independence Air became quickly known for the humorous touches it added to the flying experience, such as replacing the flight attendant safety announcements with prerecorded versions of the warnings by celebrities such as James Carville and Mary Matalin. They also attracted attention from their partnership with the Laugh Factory and the use of former baggage handler Dave George as "the Flyi Guy" — the airline's resident comedian.

== Corporate affairs ==
=== Headquarters ===
Independence Air had its headquarters in Loudoun Gateway III in the Loudoun Gateway Corporate Center in Dulles, unincorporated Loudoun County, Virginia. The facility is located at the intersection of Virginia Route 28 and Virginia Route 606, 1 mile (1.6 km) north of the Dulles Toll Road and near Washington Dulles International Airport. The three-story, 76,557 square feet (7,112.4 m^{2}) building has an about 25,000 RSF floor plate. The entire Loudoun Gateway Corporate Center has about 38.6 acres (15.6 ha) of space. Grubb & Ellis had originally leased 76,982 square feet (7,151.9 m^{2}) of the building to Atlantic Coast Airlines.

== Fleet ==
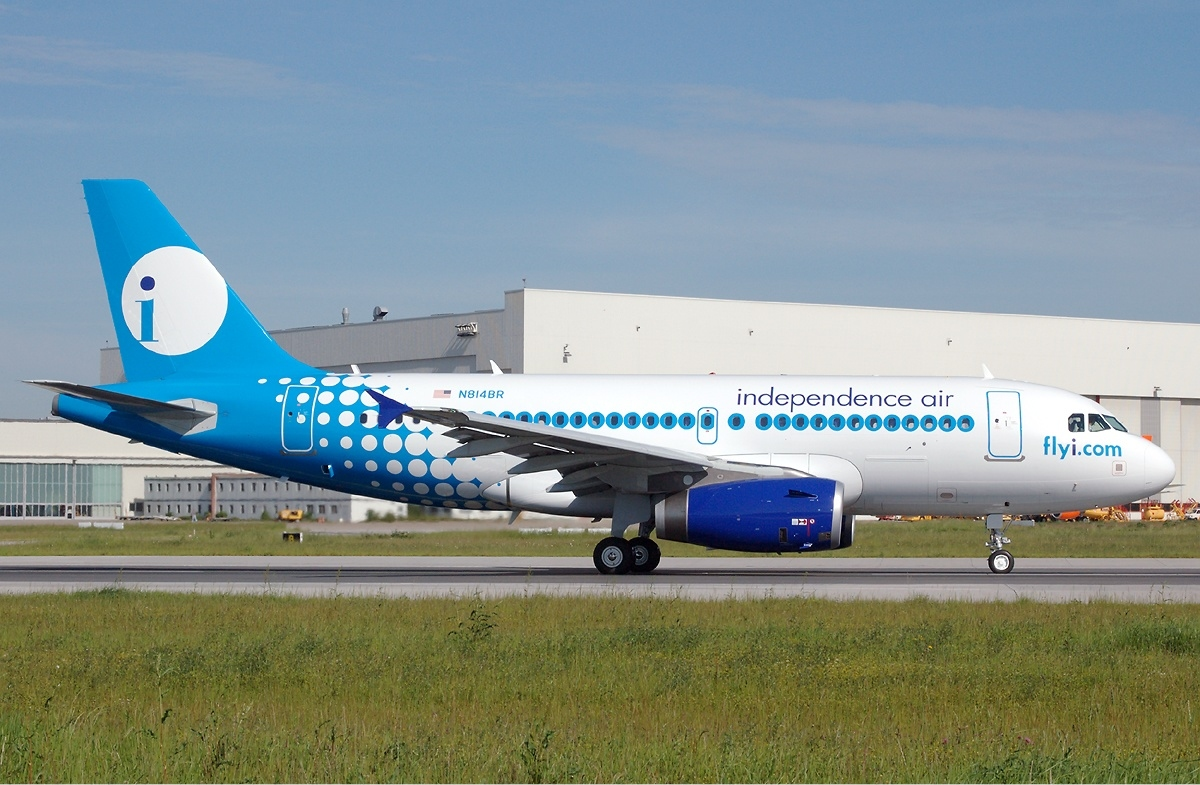
Independence Air Airbus A319 in 2005

From the airline's beginning, its fleet mix was cited as one of the causes of its financial troubles. Independence Air's fleet ebbed and flowed in an attempt to stay in business. In February 2005, the airline canceled the lease on more than 20 Bombardier CRJ200 jets and British Aerospace Jetstream 41 turbo-prop planes.

At the time of its last flight, Independence had 42 planes, down from a peak of 87.

=== Historical fleet ===
Independence Air previously operated the following aircraft:

Aircraft	Total	Introduced	Retired	Notes
Airbus A319-100	12	2004	2006	
Bombardier CRJ200ER	87	2004	2006	
Fairchild Dornier 328JET	33	2004	2004	

== Decline ==
After its emergence as an independent brand name, Independence Air became known for offering very low airfares: as little as $29 one-way to Florida from Washington Dulles International Airport. However, the company never overcame a series of financial problems during its transition, and its decline started only six months after its launch.

In February 2005, one of its aircraft was repossessed after the company missed a lease payment, after trying and failing to restructure the lease. Later that year, three more aircraft were sold or repossessed and in November 2005, FLYi, Inc., their parent company, declared bankruptcy. The company cited rising costs in the airline industry as the reason its low-cost strategy did not succeed.

In the intervening months between FLYi's declaration of bankruptcy and Independence Air's cessation of operations, a number of airlines expressed an interest in acquiring the airline's assets including: Mesa Air Group, United Airlines and Richard Branson.

Not finding a suitable buyer in time to keep the planes flying, Independence Air announced on January 2, 2006, that it would cease operations at 7:26 p.m. UTC-5 on January 5, 2006, following a flight from Westchester County Airport in New York. When the airline ceased operations, it employed more than 2,500 staff, many of whom had been with the airline since its inception as Atlantic Coast Airlines. Over its 18 months of operation, Independence carried more than 8 million passengers.

On March 10, 2006, Northwest Airlines bought the operating certificate of Independence Air for $2 million to establish a new regional airline. On March 29, 2006, Northwest reported that Independence Air would be renamed Compass Airlines. The first flight route would be a twice daily service between Washington Dulles International Airport and Minneapolis-Saint Paul International Airport beginning in early June 2006.

== Destinations ==
At the time of its shutdown on January 5, 2006, Independence operated 200 daily departures to 37 destinations throughout the United States, up from 78 flights at its launch.

== See also ==
- List of defunct airlines of the United States
