= ESJ =

ESJ may refer to:

- Eastern SkyJets, an Emirati airline
- École supérieure de journalisme, a French institution of higher education
- Elementary School Journal
- Episcopal School of Jacksonville, in Florida, United States
- Externado San José, a school in San Salvador, El Salvador
- Errol Spence Jr., American professional boxer
