= Dulles, Virginia =

Unincorporated community in Virginia, United States

Dulles
- Unincorporated area
- Location of Dulles in Northern Virginia Dulles (Virginia) Dulles (the United States)
- Coordinates: 38°57′6″N 77°26′53″W
- Country: United States
- State: Virginia
- County: Loudoun
- Time zone: UTC−5 (Eastern (EST))
  - Summer (DST): UTC−4 (EDT)
- ZIP codes: 20166-20189
- GNIS feature ID: 1927305

Dulles (/ˈdʌlɪs/ DUL-iss) is an unincorporated area in Loudoun County, Virginia, United States, and is part of the Washington metropolitan area. The headquarters of Northrop Grumman Innovation Systems and ODIN Technologies, as well as the former headquarters of MCI Inc. and AOL are located in Dulles. The National Weather Service Baltimore/Washington forecast office and the National Weather Service's Sterling Field Support Center are also both in Dulles.

== Geography ==
Dulles covers roughly the southwestern third of Sterling (another unincorporated community). The usage of Dulles as a community name began in the mid-1980s when Loudoun County economic development officer Pam Treadwell successfully lobbied the United States Postal Service to allow Sterling businesses and residents to use Dulles as an alternative address. The USPS defines Dulles as an "acceptable" city name for the 20166 ZIP code, whose "recommended" city name is Sterling. Dulles is also the city name for ZIP code 20189.

The addresses for shipping parcels to United States embassies and consulates, as well as their employees worldwide, are located in Dulles.

== Transport ==
Dulles International Airport is located partially in Dulles (although its postal address uses the Sterling name instead) and partially in Fairfax County. The community derives its name from the airport; the airport in turn takes its name from former U.S. Secretary of State John Foster Dulles (1888–1959).

The Loudon Gateway metro station is in Dulles, in addition to the Dulles International Airport station.

== Economy ==
Northrop Grumman Innovation Systems has its headquarters on Warp Drive in Dulles. AOL had its headquarters at 22000 AOL Way in Dulles. In 2007, AOL announced that it would move its headquarters from Loudoun County to New York City, though it would continue to operate its Virginia offices.

Before its dissolution, FLYi, Inc./Independence Air (originally Atlantic Coast Airlines) was headquartered in Dulles. Prior to its dissolution, MAXjet Airways was headquartered on the grounds of Dulles International Airport and in Dulles. Cryptek was headquartered in Dulles before its acquisition in 2009.

Other companies have offices in Dulles, e.g., Harris IT Services, a wholly owned subsidiary of Harris Corporation.

Dulles Town Center, a large enclosed shopping mall, is also located in the northern part of Dulles.
