= United Express Flight 6291 =

1994 aviation accident in Ohio

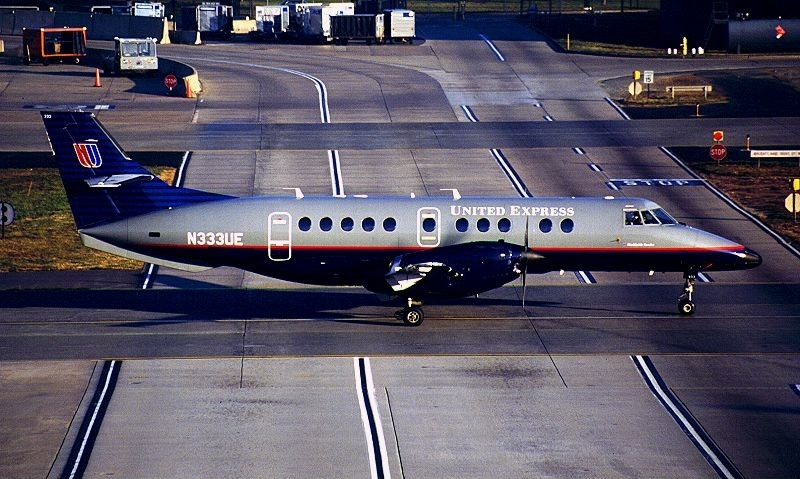
- An Atlantic Coast Airlines British Aerospace Jetstream 41 operating for United Express, similar to the one involved in the accident

Accident
- Date: January 7, 1994
- Summary: Stalled on approach due to pilot error
- Site: Gahanna, near Port Columbus International Airport, Columbus, Ohio, United States; 39°59′31.8″N 82°50′49.8″W

Aircraft
- Aircraft type: British Aerospace Jetstream 41
- Operator: Atlantic Coast Airlines on behalf of United Express
- Call sign: BLUE RIDGE 6291
- Registration: N304UE
- Flight origin: Dulles International Airport, Washington D.C., United States
- Destination: Port Columbus International Airport, Ohio, United States
- Occupants: 8
- Passengers: 5
- Crew: 3
- Fatalities: 5
- Injuries: 2
- Survivors: 3

United Express Flight 6291 was a regularly scheduled United Express flight from Dulles International Airport near Washington, D.C. to Port Columbus International Airport in Columbus, Ohio. It was a service operated by Atlantic Coast Airlines on behalf of United Express.

Late on the night of January 7, 1994, the British Aerospace Jetstream 41 operating as Flight 6291 stalled and crashed on approach to Port Columbus International Airport. The two pilots, the flight attendant, and two passengers died in the crash. The surviving passengers were a Taiwanese family of three.

== Accident ==
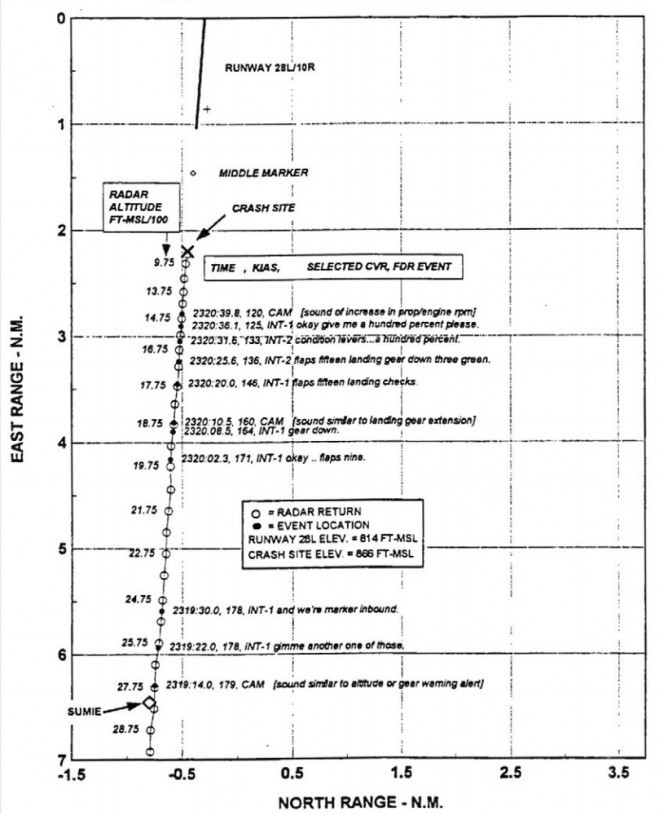
NTSB diagram of Flight 6291's flight path

Flight 6291 departed from Dulles at 9:58 p.m. EST for the 90-minute flight to Columbus. The crew consisted of Captain Derrick White (35), First Officer Anthony Samuels (29) and flight attendant Manuela Walker (58). There were five passengers on board.

At 11:10 p.m., Columbus approach control was contacted. The captain advised the controller that the aircraft was descending through 13,200 ft (4,000 m) to 11,000 ft (3,400 m). The controller assigned a 285-degree heading to intercept the instrument landing system (ILS) for Runway 28L and cleared Flight 6291 to 10,000 ft (3,000 m). An updated weather report at 11:15 p.m. reported a cloud overcast 800 ft (240 m) above the ground, visibility 2.5 miles (4.0 km) in light snow and fog with wind 300 degrees at 4 knots. A Runway 28L ILS approach clearance was issued when the flight passed the SUMIE final approach fix. A clearance to land on Runway 28L was granted two minutes later.

The aircraft was descending through an altitude of 1,250 ft (380 m) when the stick shaker activated and sounded for 3 seconds. After 1.5 seconds, the stick shaker sounded again. The aircraft continued to descend below the glide slope until it collided with a stand of trees in a high nose-up attitude. It came to rest upright in a commercial building, 1.2 mi (1.9 km) short of the runway. After the impact, a fire started in or near the left engine, which spread to the rest of the aircraft. At least four of the passengers survived the crash, but only three escaped before the aircraft was fully engulfed in flames. The survivors' escape was slowed when they experienced difficulty releasing their seatbelts.

Almost immediately after the stall warning activated, Captain White asked in an alarmed manner "Tony! What did you do?" This shows that Captain White likely believed that First Officer Samuels, who had only worked at the airline for a short time and was relatively inexperienced, was responsible for the problem. Neither pilot, one of whom was inexperienced and the other had a history of failed check rides, performed the proper stall recovery procedure detailed by the aircraft’s manufacturer in the Airplane Flight Manual. The pilots' subsequent recovery attempt was ineffective and improper.

== Investigation ==
The National Transportation Safety Board (NTSB) investigated the crash and released a report on October 6, 1994 that faulted the crew and Atlantic Coast Airlines. The pilots attempted a poorly planned and unstable approach, during which they failed to maintain both airspeed and altitude, then improperly responded to a stall warning. Compounding this was that both pilots lacked experience with electronic flight instrument systems. The airline failed to provide adequate stabilized approach criteria, suitable training simulators and crew resource-management training. The report also cited that Atlantic Coast should not have paired an inexperienced first officer with a captain who had a history of failed check rides.

The report recommended that the type of seatbelts used in the Jetstream 41 should be removed from aircraft, and that certification of future seatbelt designs include a test matching the conditions that were experienced during the accident.

== In popular culture ==
The crash of United Express Flight 6291 was covered in "Slam Dunk", a Season 19 episode of the internationally syndicated Canadian TV documentary series Mayday (known as “Air Crash Investigation).

== See also ==
- Colgan Air Flight 3407 – a similar accident caused by an aerodynamic stall
