= Eastern SkyJets =

Emirati charter airline

| IATA | ICAO | Call sign |
|---|---|---|
| EE | ESJ | EASTERN SKYJETS |
- Founded: 2004
- Ceased operations: 2016
- Hubs: Dubai International Airport and Ras Al Khaima Airport ,
- Focus cities: Kandahar, Bagram, Camp Bastion
- Fleet size: 9
- Destinations: Entire Middle East, Asia, Africa and Europe
- Headquarters: Dubai, United Arab Emirates Ras Al khaima Airport
- Website: http://www.esj.aero

Eastern SkyJets was a charter airline, with full infrastructure based at Dubai International Airport, and Ras Al Khaima airport.

== Operations ==
ESJ had been operating flights in the Middle East, Africa, Europe, Asia, and the Subcontinent region, under its own UAE Air Operator Certificate (AOC) and CAR145 Approved Maintenance Organization.

ESJ was a specialist in hostile areas with extensive experience in the Afghanistan territory, and operated daily scheduled charter flights for AeroTech Aviation, connecting Dubai with the military airfields of Kandahar, Bagram, and Camp Bastion in Afghanistan.

Eastern SkyJets was a key regional air transport provider, with clientele ranging from a number of multinational blue chip companies, to government organizations, such as the US Government, the United Nations, and various military organizations.

Eastern SkyJets was the only UAE registered passenger charter airline to be approved by the United Nations World Food Programme (UNWFP), and held the contract for its Kabul–Dubai service.

The carrier ended operations in 2016.

== Fleet ==
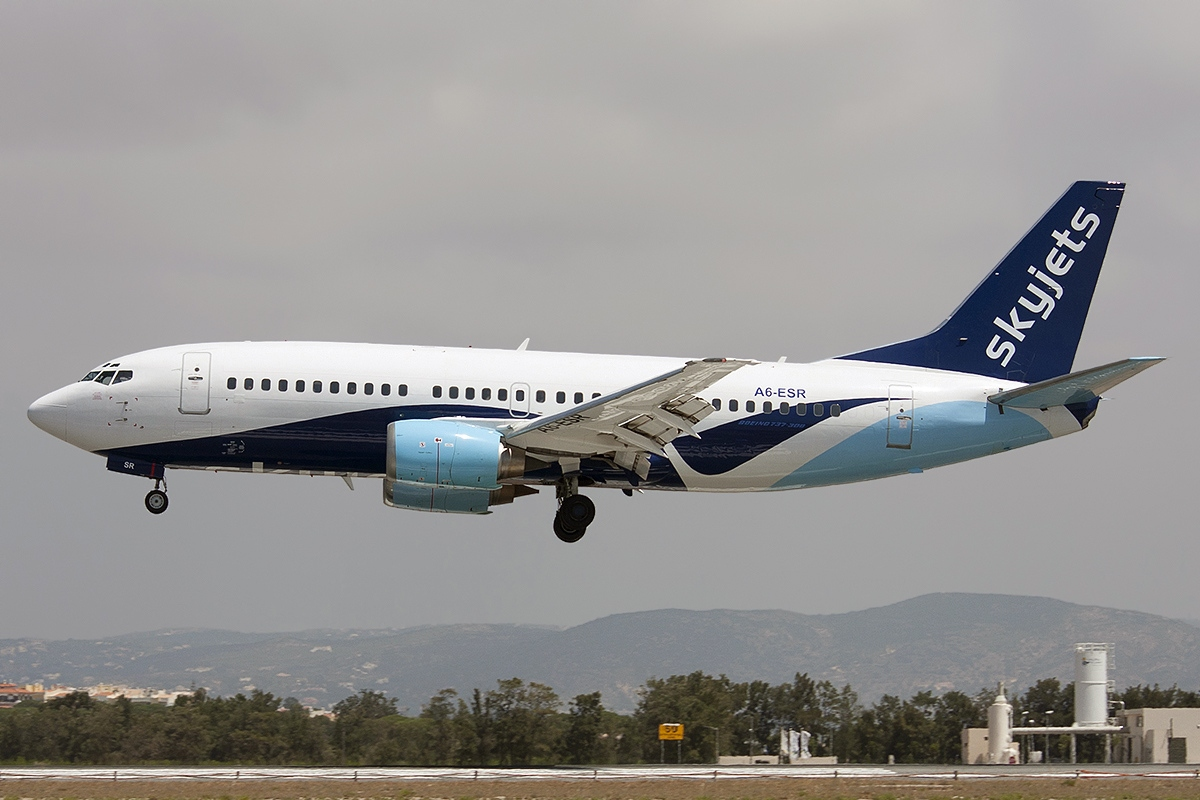
An Eastern Skyjets Boeing 737 landing in Faro Airport, Portugal

The Eastern SkyJets fleet consisted of the following aircraft (as of August 2016):

Fleet
| Aircraft | In service | Orders |
|---|---|---|
| Boeing 737-300 | 1 | 0 |
| British Aerospace Jetstream 41 | 1 | 0 |
| Total | 2 | 0 |

The airline fleet previously included the following aircraft (as of August 2014):

- 4 Boeing 737-400
- 1 Fokker 70 / 100
- 1 Jetstream 41
- 3 Douglas DC-9-32
- 1 Douglas DC-9-51
