= Cryptek =

US information security company

Cryptek, Inc.
- Company type: Privately owned
- Industry: Information Security
- Founded: 1986
- Fate: Acquired by API Nanotronics Corp.
- Headquarters: Dulles, VA, United States
- Website: www.cryptek.com

Cryptek, Inc., was a company that developed and sold information security products and services to governments and corporations. Cryptek was headquartered in Dulles, Virginia, United States. The company was acquired by API Nanotronics Corp. in 2009.

== History ==
Cryptek was founded in 1986 as Cryptek Secure Communications, Inc. At that time, the company designed and manufactured field-deployable, secure FAX machines for the military of the United States. In 1988, Cryptek was acquired by General Kinetics, a manufacturer of secure enclosures and other products. In 1993, General Kinetics also acquired Verdix, a manufacturer of secure computer networking equipment for the government of the United States.

In 1996, private equity firm Angelo, Gordon & Co. acquired the FAX and secure networking businesses of General Kinetics. The company continued to operate as Cryptek Secure Communications, LLC. The company simplified its name to Cryptek, Inc. in 2002.

In 2005, Cryptek went through a corporate restructuring in which Bill Anderson became the President and CEO. In 2007, Cryptek acquired three companies: Secure Systems Group of Sterling, Virginia, United States, Emcon Emanation Control Ltd. of Ottawa, Ontario, Canada, and Secure Systems & Technologies Ltd (SST) of Gloucester, United Kingdom. In that same year, Cryptek also acquired the assets of ION Networks of South Plainfield, New Jersey, United States.

== Bankruptcy ==
In November 2008, the company filed for Chapter 11 bankruptcy protection. In March 2009, Cryptek petitioned to move to Chapter 7 bankruptcy.

Through a senior management purchase of assets, a new company Cryptek Technologies, Inc. began operation on March 11, 2009.

In July 2009, Cryptek was acquired by defense and aerospace company, API Nanotronics Corp.

== Products ==
- ION Secure Remote Management Systems - a suite of products to control and manage vendor remote access on enterprise networks.
- Netgard Identity Card Access Systems - a suite of products that control and manage user access to walk-up devices, such as multi-function printers and scanners, by requiring users to have a valid Smartcard or Common Access Card (CAC).
- TEMPEST and Emanation Security Products - a suite of computing and communications products that conform to various government standards for electronic emanation control known as TEMPEST. These products are provided under the Cryptek, Emcon and SST brand names.

== See also ==
- Encryption
- Information Security
- TEMPEST
