= Air Republiq =

Airlines in Philippines

Air Republiq Airlines
IATA	ICAO	Call sign
—	—	REPUBLIQ
- Founded: 2011
- Hubs: Ninoy Aquino International Airport; Basco Airport
- Fleet size: 4
- Destinations: Manila; Basco; Itbayat; Tuguegarao; Coron; Cauayan; Laoag
- Headquarters: Manila
- Key people: Capt. Benedict B. Dela Cruz (President); Capt. Ramil B. Rivera (CEO)
- Website: www.airrepubliqairlines.com

Air Republiq Airlines is an airline in the Philippines running unscheduled flights to the northern Philippines.

Earlier called Batanes Airlines, Air Republiq commenced operations in 2011 as an arm of South Phoenix Airlines to cater to the islands of Batanes, linking them to different major cities of Luzon. It uses the Piper Navajo for this purpose. Operating with an interline agreement with Cyclone Airways (an offshoot of Cyclone Flight Training School, located in Cauayan), Air Republiq flies under an air operator's certification from Cyclone Airways.

The airline runs unscheduled flights to Batanes (the northernmost part of the Philippines) and connects Basco to Laoag and Tuguegarao.

In 2013, the company acquired a BAe Jetstream 41 on a lease purchase basis, with plans to use this aircraft to connect Manila to several underserved routes in the Philippines. With the idea of connecting the islands and expanding the routes, the company decided to restructure the fleet with ATR 42-320 for better performance. The airline also planned to procure its own air operator's certificate from the CAAP by 2015, and was looking to start international flights to Taiwan and Malaysia by 2016.

== Destinations ==
The airline serves from Manila and Basco to Itbayat, Tuguegarao, Coron, Cauayan, Laoag, Taiwan and Malaysia

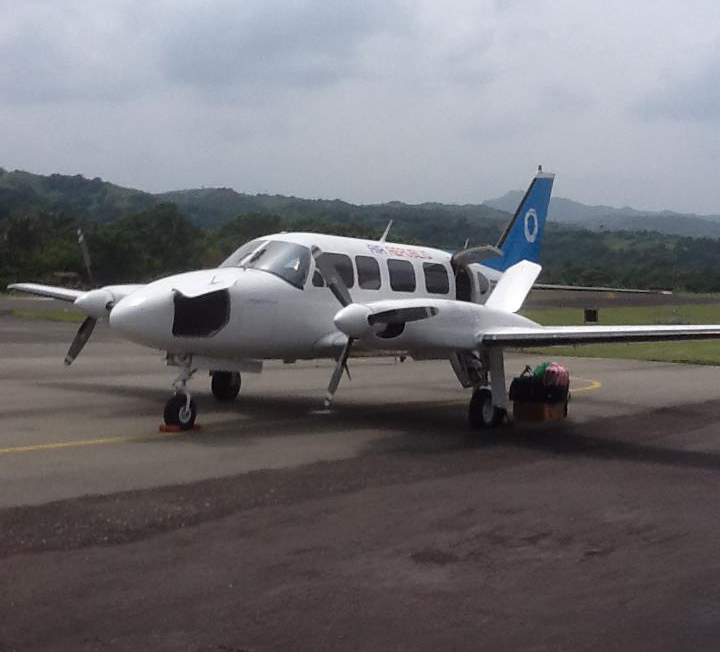
Piper Navajo Chieftain in Batanes

== Fleet ==
The fleet consists of a Beechcraft King Air B200, a Cessna 421, a BAe Jetstream 41 and a Piper PA-31-30 Navajo Chieftain.

=== Former fleet ===
The airline formerly operated a Cessna 172

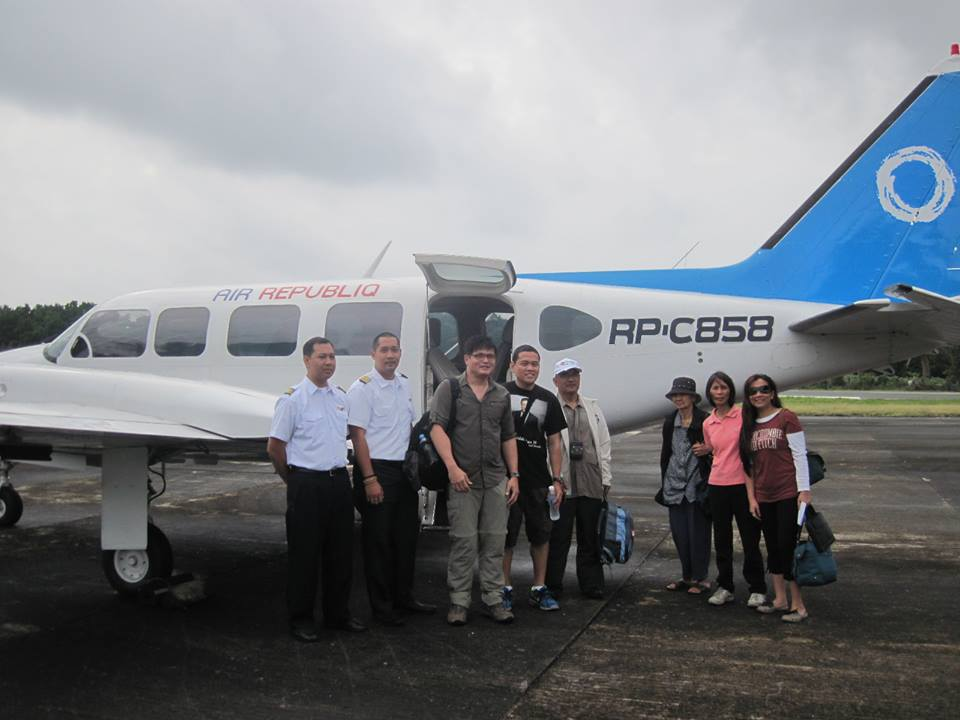
Piper Navajo Chieftain with flight crew and passengers
