= Atlantic Coast Airlines =

Regional airline of the United States (1989–2004)

IATA	ICAO	Call sign
DH	BLR	BLUE RIDGE
- Founded: December 15, 1989
- Ceased operations: August 4, 2004
- Hubs: Washington–Dulles
- Focus cities: Chicago–O'Hare
- Frequent-flyer program: SkyMiles (Delta); Mileage Plus (United)
- Alliance: SkyTeam (Delta); Star Alliance (United)
- Fleet size: 121
- Destinations: 37
- Parent company: Atlantic Coast Holdings, Inc.
- Headquarters: Dulles, Virginia, U.S.
- Key people: Kerry Skeen (CEO)
- Website: atlanticcoast.com

Atlantic Coast Airlines (ACA) was a regional airline based in the United States owned by Atlantic Coast Holdings, Inc. It operated as United Express for United Airlines and Delta Connection for Delta Air Lines. It was headquartered in the Dulles area of unincorporated Loudoun County, Virginia, United States. Previously it was headquartered in Reston, unincorporated Fairfax County. Before then, it was headquartered in Sterling, unincorporated Loudoun County.

== History ==
The airline was established and started operations on December 15, 1989, and had been in a marketing agreement with United Airlines since its inception. In 1999 it established Atlantic Coast Jet to operate as a Delta Connection carrier, but this was later reintegrated.

Atlantic Coast Airlines operated United Express flights out of Dulles and O'Hare International Airport in Chicago with Jetstream 32, Jetstream 41, De Havilland Canada Dash 8, Embraer EMB 120 Brasilia and Bombardier CRJ100/200 aircraft. Their Delta Connection flights out of Logan International Airport in Boston, New York City's LaGuardia Airport, and Cincinnati/Northern Kentucky International Airport in Covington, Kentucky were operated with the Fairchild Dornier 328. During 2003 revenues were generated about 80% from United Express operations and 20% from Delta Connection.

United Airlines entered bankruptcy protection in December 2002. At that time United Airlines contracted a consulting firm, Bain, to renegotiate its regional partners contracts. Atlantic Coast Airlines employees and management went through a significant cost reduction program to remain competitive as a United Express carrier. Presented with overwhelming competition from other regional airlines Atlantic Coast Airlines and United Airlines were unable to negotiate a mutual agreement. At that time Atlantic Coast Airlines continued to honor its 10-year contract with United Airlines. Expecting that United would be unable to honor that contract, Atlantic Coast Airlines developed an alternate business plan.

After announcing plans to part with United Airlines, Atlantic Coast Airlines' significant cash position made it a prime target for a takeover attempt. Mesa Air Group launched an attempt at a hostile takeover in the summer of 2003, engaging in what some allege were significant U.S. Securities and Exchange Commission violations. At the same time the employees of Atlantic Coast Airlines organized a grass roots effort to avert the takeover attempt. Within a few months the stock purchase plan was removed by Mesa.

On November 19, 2003, Atlantic Coast Airlines announced that it would become a low-cost carrier under the name of Independence Air. Its status as a United Express carrier ended on August 4, 2004, and its status as a Delta Connection carrier ended November 2, 2004. Operations as Independence Air began on June 16, 2004. On January 5, 2006, Independence Air ceased operations.

On March 10, 2006, Northwest Airlines purchased the DOT Operating Certificate of then-Independence Air with the intent to use that certificate to form a new regional subsidiary. The result was Compass Airlines, which began service using Embraer E175 jets in August 2007.

== See also ==
- List of defunct airlines of the United States
- United Express Flight 6291, a flight operated by ACA for United that crashed.
