= FLYi =

American airline holding company

- Commenced operations: 2004
- Ceased operations: January 6, 2006
- Subsidiaries: Independence Air
- Headquarters: Loudoun County, Virginia, United States

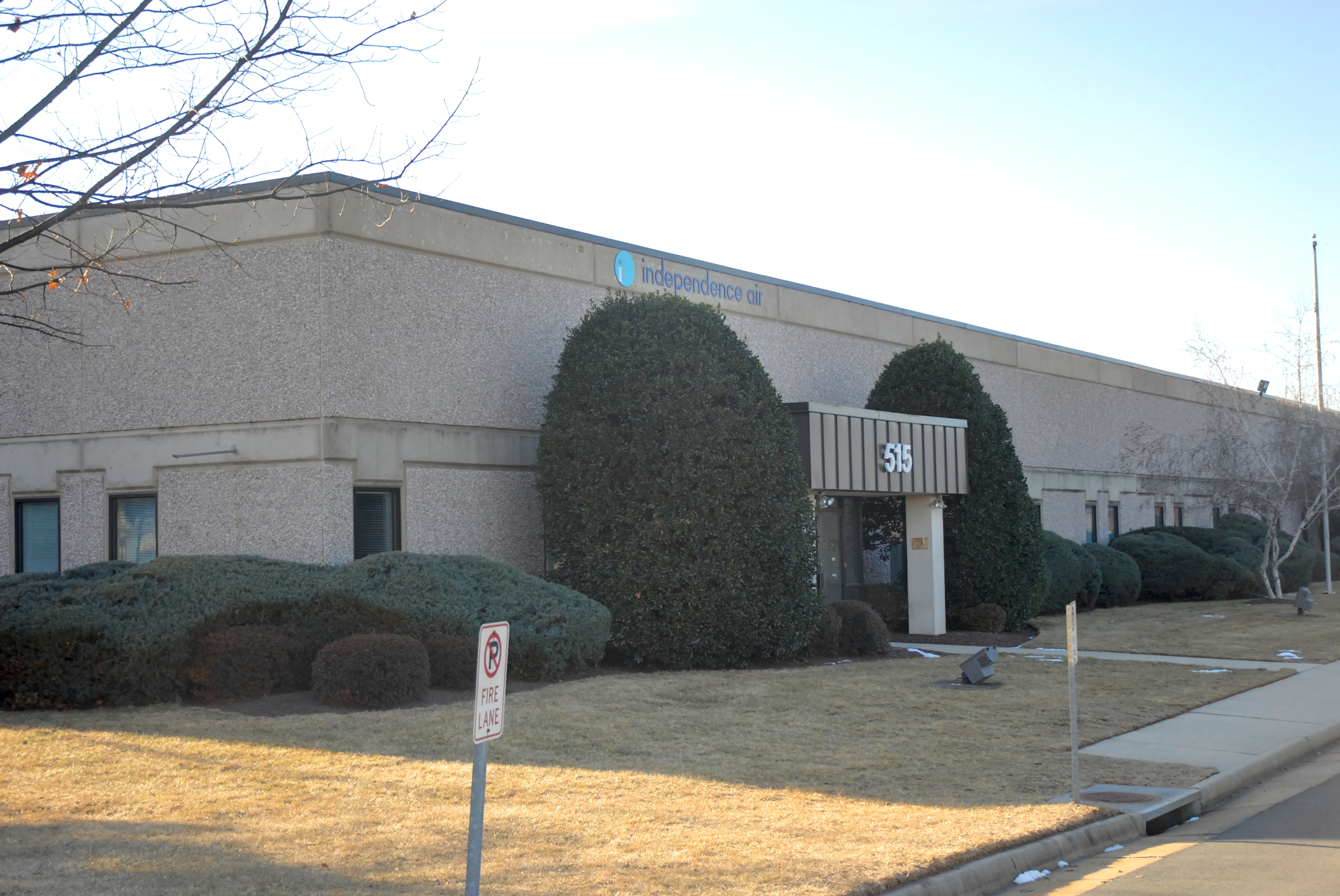
FLYi headquarters

FLYi, Inc., previously known as Atlantic Coast Airlines Holdings, Inc., was a Delaware airline holding company based in the Dulles area of unincorporated Loudoun County, Virginia. Prior to filing for Chapter 11 Bankruptcy, the company operated Independence Air.

== History ==
Atlantic Coast Airlines Holdings, Inc. was a commuter airline formed in 1989. Atlantic Coast Airlines operated as United Express and Delta Connection. Upon termination of their codeshare agreements, in 2004 the company changed its name to FLYi, Inc, representing the airline's new name, Independence Air.

On November 7, 2005, FLYi, Inc. and its subsidiaries filed for Chapter 11 bankruptcy protection in the US Bankruptcy Court for the District of Delaware. This press release declares that they expected to attract new investors within sixty days of the filing.

Due to Flyi not finding an investor as expected, Flyi ceased operations on January 5, 2006 at 7:00 p.m. UTC-5. The airline's operating certificate was purchased by Northwest Airlines and operated as Compass Airlines. The company had traded on the Pink Sheets under the symbol FLYIQ, but the stock has since ceased trading there.
