= Guna Airlines =

Airline based in Nepal

IATA	ICAO	Call sign
—	GUA	—
- Founded: 2009; 17 years ago (first iteration); 2021; 5 years ago (second iteration)
- Hubs: Tribhuvan International Airport
- Fleet size: 5
- Destinations: 10
- Parent company: Guna Group
- Headquarters: Baneshwor, Kathmandu, Nepal
- Key people: Rajendra Shakya (Chairman) Diprash Shakya (Managing Director)
- Employees: 100+
- Website: www.flyguna.com

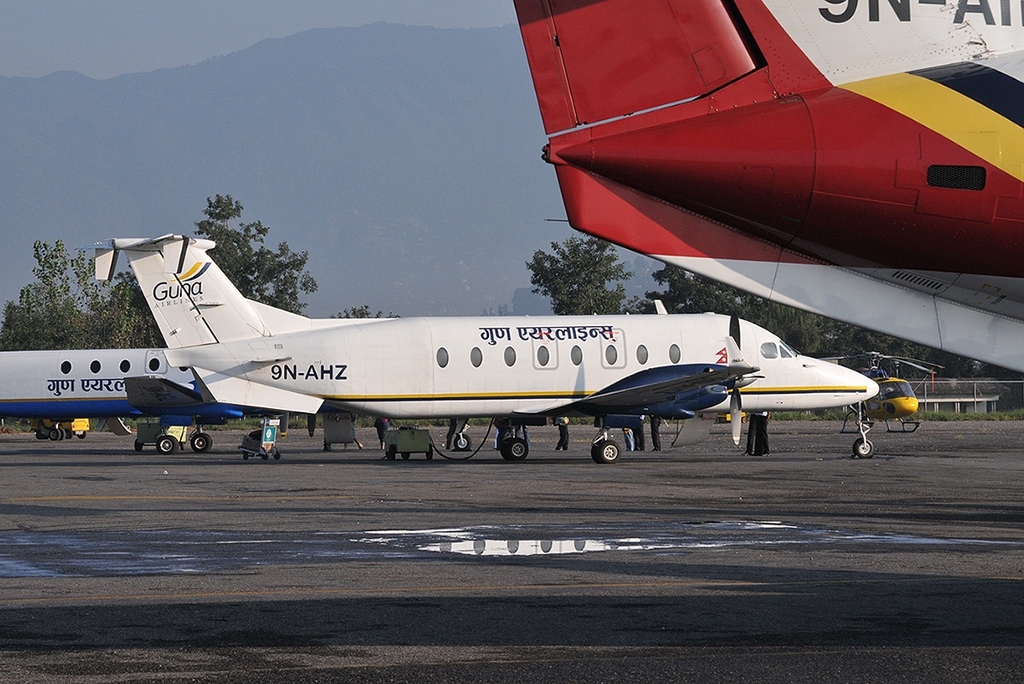
Guna Airlines Beechcraft at Tribhuvan International Airport, Kathmandu

Guna Airlines Pvt. Ltd. (Nepali: गुण एयरलाइन्स) was an airline based in Nepal operating domestic scheduled flights from its base at Tribhuvan International Airport. Guna Airlines was initially formed in 2009, when it was part of the Guna Group a Nepalese conglomerate of companies. After ceasing operations in 2013 and transferring its operations to Simrik Airlines, the airline restarted operations in 2021 while retransferring operations back into the initial airline company.

== History ==
The Guna Group began as a small gold shop known as Guna Jewellers in Patan in 1984 and has since grown to a multi-industry company. In 2009, the group launched Guna Airlines.

In 2013, Guna Airlines ceased trading due to financial difficulties and was acquired by Simrik Airlines for NRs 350 million. Simrik Airlines used the Brand of Guna for some more time before renaming and repainting the two Beechcraft 1900 aircraft, that were previously operated by Guna Airlines.

In 2020, first reports appeared stating that Guna Airlines would be reestablished. In early 2021, the airline announced that it would buy five BAe Jetstream 41 from Yeti Airlines to restart operation under the brand name Guna Airlines. For this, chairman Rajendra Shakya invested 1 billion Nepali Rupees into the company.

On 16 September 2021, operations began again with regular flights from Kathmandu to Pokhara and Bharatpur, after which it gradually increased its network.

In early 2023, the Civil Aviation Authority of Nepal suspended all operations of the airline as it was unable to pay salaries of its staff. Later, the authority also stopped any aircraft sale of the company. This grounding continued to March 2024, when the airline prepared to resume flights.

== Destinations ==
Guna Airlines offers scheduled flights to the following destinations, all of which are suspended as of March 2023:

Destination	Airport	Notes
Bhadrapur	Bhadrapur Airport	
Biratnagar	Biratnagar Airport	
Kathmandu	Tribhuvan International Airport	Hub
Janakpur	Janakpur Airport	
Nepalgunj	Nepalgunj Airport	
Pokhara	Pokhara Airport	Terminated
Pokhara	Pokhara International Airport	
Bharatpur	Bharatpur Airport	
Siddharthanagar	Gautam Buddha Airport	
Tumlingtar	Tumlingtar Airport	
Birendranagar	Surkhet Airport	

In its previous iteration, Guna Airlines also operated scheduled mountain sightseeing flights from Kathmandu to Mount Everest.

== Fleet ==
=== Current fleet ===
As of August 2025, Guna Airlines operates the following aircraft:

Guna Airlines fleet
Aircraft	In Fleet	Orders	Passengers			Notes
Aircraft	In Fleet	Orders	C	Y	Total	Notes
BAe Jetstream 41	4	—	—	29	29	
Beechcraft 1900C	1	—	—	18	18	
Total	5					
