= Air operator's certificate =

Aviation license

An air operator's certificate issued by Russia to Aeroflot

An air operator's certificate (AOC) is the approval granted by a civil aviation authority (CAA) to an aircraft operator to allow it to use aircraft for commercial air transport purposes. This requires the operator to have personnel, assets and systems in place to ensure the safety of its employees and of the flying public. The certificate lists the approved aircraft types, each registration number approved to fly, the approved flying purpose, and in what area the holder may operate (such as specific airports or geographic region).

== Categories ==
AOCs can be granted for one or more of the following activities:

- Aerial advertising
- Aerial photography
- Aerial spotting
- Aerial surveying
- Air ambulance
- Charter (low capacity and high capacity)
- Firefighting
- Flight training
- Regular public transport (RPT) (low capacity and high capacity)

Low capacity operations is when operating aircraft with under 38 passenger seats, high capacity is greater than 38 seats.

== Requirements ==
The requirements for obtaining an AOC vary from country to country, but are generally defined as:

- Sufficient personnel with the required experience for the type of operations requested.
- Airworthy aircraft, suitable for the type of operations requested.
- Acceptable systems for the training of crew and the operation of the aircraft (Operations Manual).
- A quality system to ensure that all applicable regulations are followed.
- The appointment of key accountable staff, who are responsible for specific safety critical functions such as training, maintenance and operations.
- Carriers Liability Insurance (for Airlines) – Operators are to have sufficient insurance to cover the injury or death of any passenger carried.
- Proof that the operator has sufficient finances to fund the operation.
- The operator has sufficient ground infrastructure, or arrangements for the supply of sufficient infrastructure, to support its operations into the ports requested.
- The certificate is held by a legal person who resides in the country or region of application (for EASA).

== International variations ==
An AOC is referred to as an Air Carrier Operating Certificate in the United States and as an Air Operator Certification in New Zealand.

=== New Zealand ===
The Civil Aviation Authority of New Zealand's Part 119 establishes Air Operator Certification rules for Air Transport Operations (ATO) and Commercial Transport Operations (CTO). They provide two levels of certification: (a) AOC for air operations in all sizes of aircraft; (b) general aviation AOC for air operations in helicopters and aircraft with nine or less passenger seats.

=== United States ===
In the United States, two certifications are required to operate an airline. Economic certification is obtained from the Department of Transportation, whereas operational/safety certification is obtained from the FAA. Both are required to operate an airline.

According to the United States Department of Transportation, the Federal Aviation Administration (FAA) is to maintain an airline air carrier's operating certificate in the category of fitness. An air carrier must maintain the following three standards: adequate financing, competent management, a willingness to comply with applicable laws and regulations. At least 75 percent of airlines controlling voting equity must be held by US citizens.

== Transfer ==
An AOC is valuable. It shows the relevant CAA's acceptance of the operator's personnel, infrastructure and procedures. In most jurisdictions an AOC may be sold or acquired to avoid the arduous process of gaining regulator acceptance for a new AOC. To this end, a failed airline can be sold as a going concern and then changed into another business. For example, Northwest Airlines bought FLYi airline's AOC to start Compass Airlines, a previous feeder airline for Delta Air Lines marketed as Delta Connection. Likewise Air Australia purchased the AOC, staff and routes of the failed OzJet airlines.
