= British Aerospace Jetstream 41 =

Turboprop-powered regional airliner

Jetstream 41
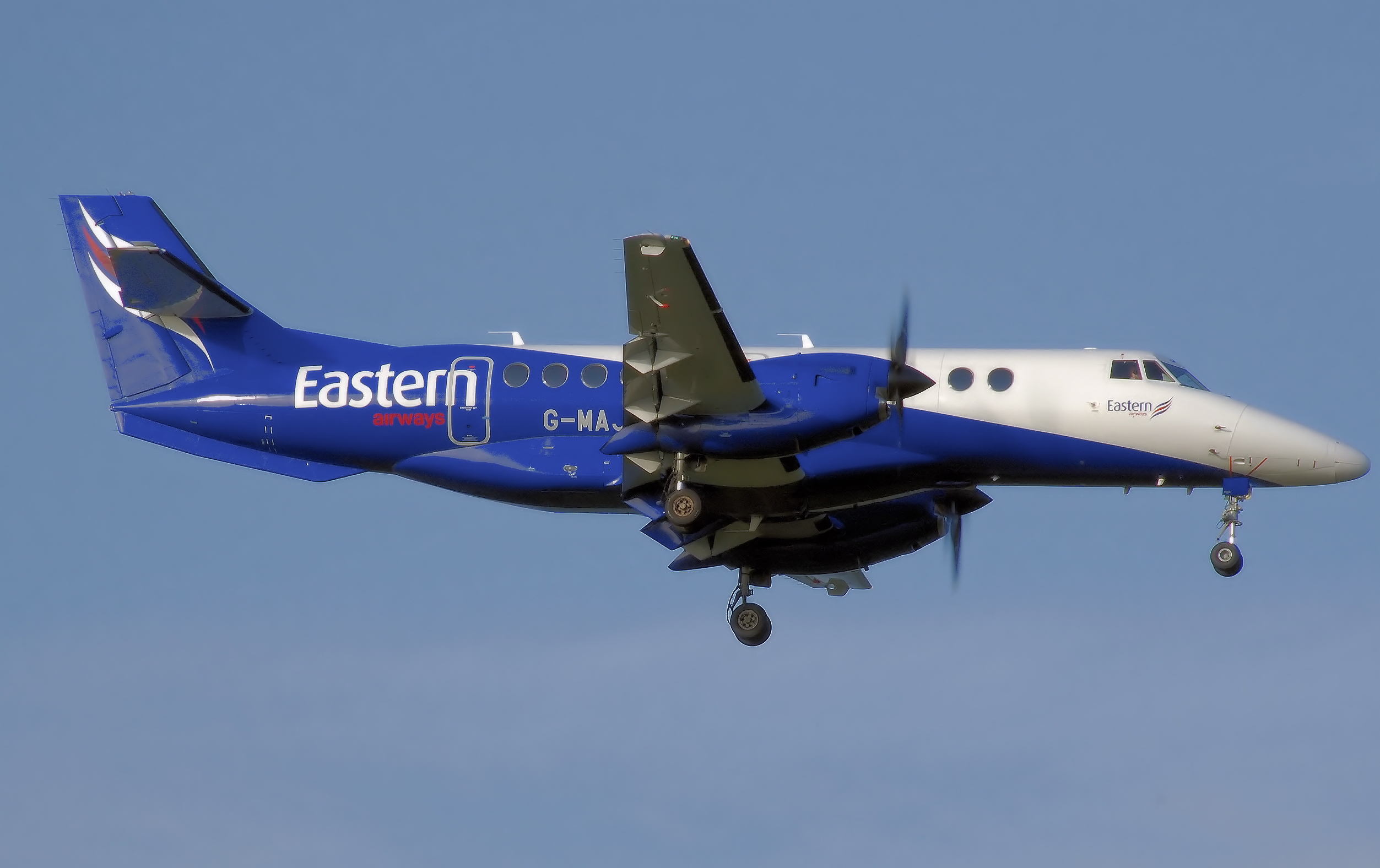
- Eastern Airways BAe Jetstream 41

General information
- Type: Regional airliner/Feederliner
- National origin: United Kingdom
- Manufacturer: British Aerospace
- Status: In service
- Primary users: Guna Airlines; Proflight Zambia
- Number built: 100

History
- Manufactured: 1992–1997
- Introduction date: 25 November 1992
- First flight: 25 September 1991
- Developed from: British Aerospace Jetstream 31

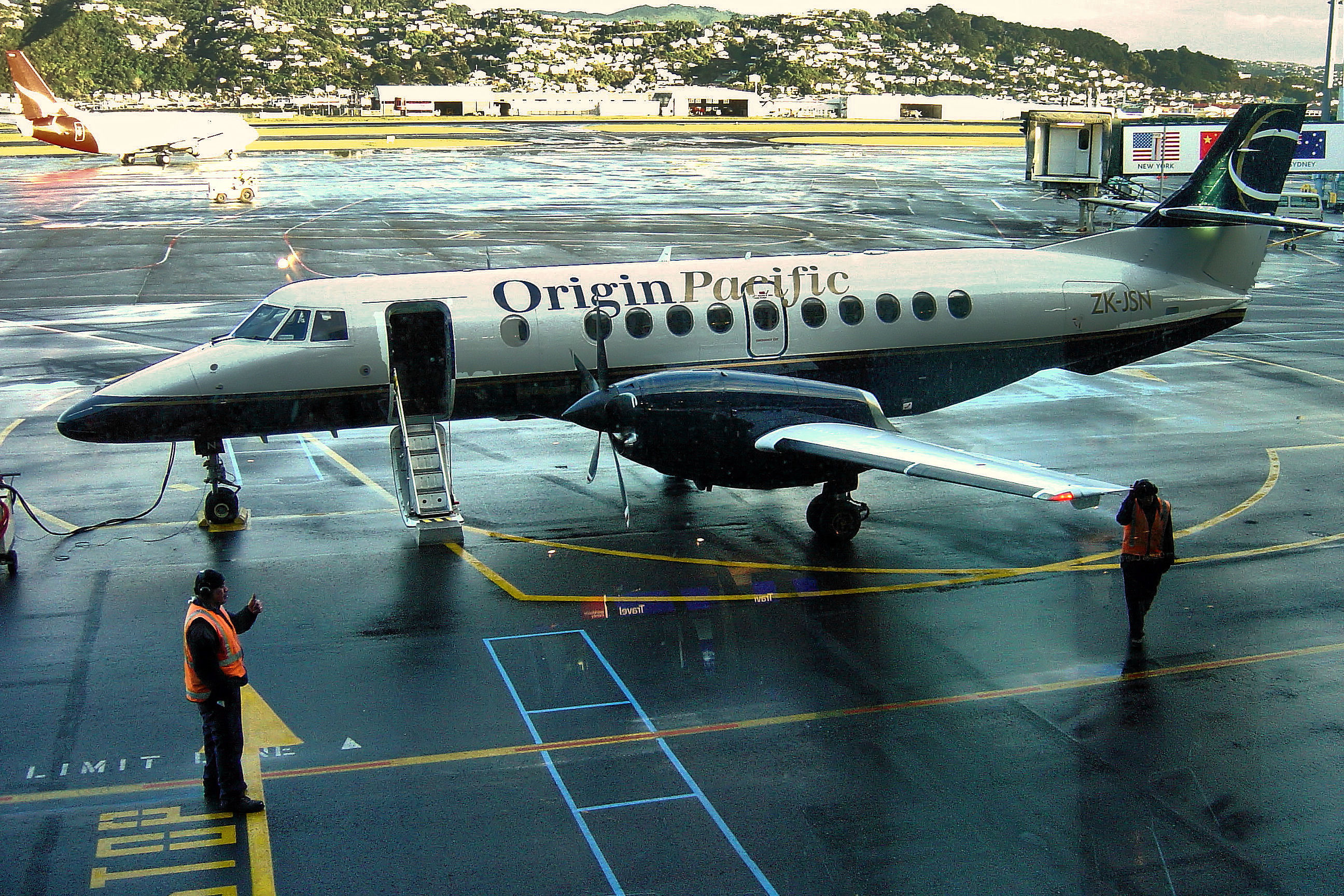
Jetstream 41 of now-defunct Origin Pacific Airways at Wellington International Airport in June 2004

The British Aerospace Jetstream 41 is a turboprop-powered feederliner and regional airliner, designed by British Aerospace as a stretched version of the Jetstream 31. Intended to compete directly with 30-seat aircraft like the Embraer Brasilia, Dornier 328 and Saab 340, the new design eventually accommodated 29 passengers in a two-by-one arrangement like the Jetstream 31. Trans States Airlines of the US was the biggest operator of Jetstream 41s in the world, with 25 in the fleet.

== Design and development ==
The Jetstream 41's stretch added 16 feet (4.9 m) to the fuselage, consisting of an 8-foot-3-inch (2.51 m) plug forward of the wing and a 7 feet 9 inches (2.36 m) plug to the rear; the fuselage design was all-new with no commonality with the old fuselage. The wing had increased span and redesigned ailerons and flaps. It was mounted below the fuselage, so the spar did not form a step in the cabin aisle. This also gave more baggage capacity in larger wing-root fairings.

The Allied Signal TPE331-14 engines deliver 1,500 shp (1,120 kW), (later 1,650 shp (1,232 kW)), and are mounted in nacelles with increased ground clearance. The flightdeck is improved with a modern EFIS setup, and a new windscreen arrangement. The J41 was the first turboprop certified to both JAR25 and FAR25 standards.

== Operational history ==
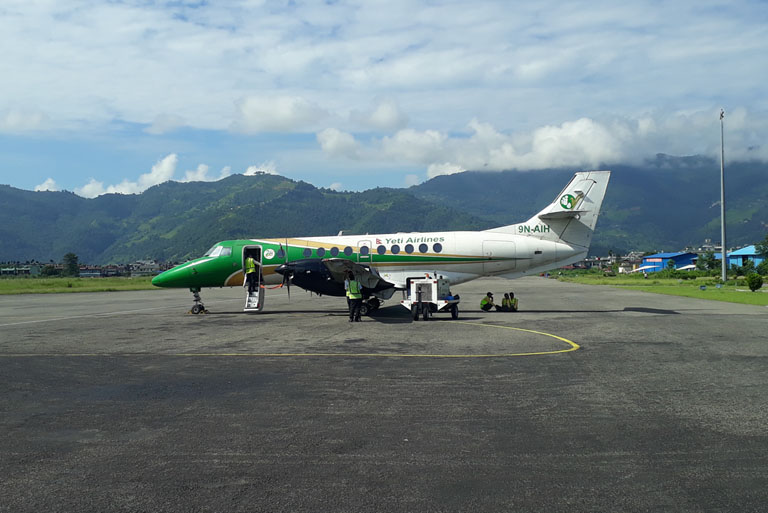
Nepal's Yeti Airlines Jetstream 41 at Pokhara Airport in 2019

The J41 flew for the first time on 25 September 1991 and was certified on 23 November 1992 in Europe, and 9 April 1993 in the United States, with the first delivery, to Manx Airlines on 25 November 1992. In January 1996, the J41 became part of the Aero International (Regional) (AI(R)), a marketing consortium consisting of ATR, Aérospatiale (of France), Alenia (of Italy), and British Aerospace. Sales initially were fairly strong, but in May 1997 BAe announced that it was terminating J41 production, with 100 aircraft delivered.

== Operators ==
As of January 2025, 20 aircraft remain in active commercial service.

=== Civil operators ===
Australia

- FlyPelican

Angola

- AirJet Exploração Aérea de Carga (2)

France

- AVdef (2)

Nepal

- Guna Airlines (4)

United States

- Fabick Cat (1)
- Theia Aviation (1)

Congo

- Malu Aviation (5)

Zambia

- Proflight Zambia (5)

=== Former civil operators ===
Australia

- Brindabella Airlines
- Impulse Airlines
- National Jet Systems

Canada

- Air Atlantic

Colombia

- EasyFly (Colombia) (14)

Honduras

- Lanhsa Airlines (1)
Hong Kong

- Hong Kong Government Flying Service – (2) for search-and-rescue.

Greece

- Sky Express (1)

Dominican Republic

- Sky High Aviation Services (2)

Nepal

- Yeti Airlines (7)

South Africa

- Airlink (8)

Mozambique

- Moçambique Expresso (1)

Nepal

- Agni Air (3)

New Zealand

- Origin Pacific Airways (5)

United Arab Emirates

- Eastern SkyJets (1)

United Kingdom

- Loganair (3)
- Eastern Airways (9)
- Highland Airways(2)

United States

- Trans States Airlines (25) – aircraft operated as American Connection, Delta Connection and Trans World Express providing passenger feed service on behalf of respective major air carrier partners American Airlines, Delta Air Lines and Trans World Airlines (TWA).
- Atlantic Coast Airlines – aircraft operated as United Express providing passenger feed service on behalf of major air carrier partner United Airlines.
- Contour Airlines (4)

Uruguay

- Delbitur (1)

Philippines

- Royal Star Aviation (1)
- Air Republiq Airlines (1)
- Venezolana (9)

=== Military operators ===
Thailand

- Royal Thai Army

== Accidents and incidents ==
- On 7 January 1994, United Express Flight 6291 crashed short of the runway at Port Columbus International Airport, killing five people out of eight passengers and crew.
- On 24 September 2009, South African Airlink Flight 8911 crashed in the suburb of Merebank in Durban, South Africa, shortly after takeoff from Durban International Airport. The crew of three and one person on the ground was injured. The captain, Allister Freeman, died as a result of complications from his injuries on 7 October 2009.
- On March 26, 2012, EasyFly Flight 8697, a British Aerospace Jetstream 41, presented a hydraulic fluid spill during a flight. The aircraft landed without complications in José María Córdoba International Airport.
- On 24 September 2016, A Yeti Airlines flight registration 9N-AIB en route from Kathmandu to Bhairahawa overran the runway while landing at Gautam Buddha Airport. All 29 passengers and the crew of 3 were unhurt but the aircraft was damaged beyond repair.
- On April 8, 2019, a British Aerospace Jetstream 41 (registration HI1038) crash landed at Douglas Charles Airport, Commonwealth of Dominica, after a commercial flight from Santo Domingo, Dominican Republic. There were no fatalities.

== Aircraft on display ==
The prototype Jetstream 41 G-JMAC is preserved by the Speke Aerodrome Heritage Group (SAHG) on the former airside apron behind the Crowne Plaza Liverpool John Lennon Airport Hotel, which was the original terminal building of Liverpool Speke Airport.

== Specifications (Jetstream 41) ==
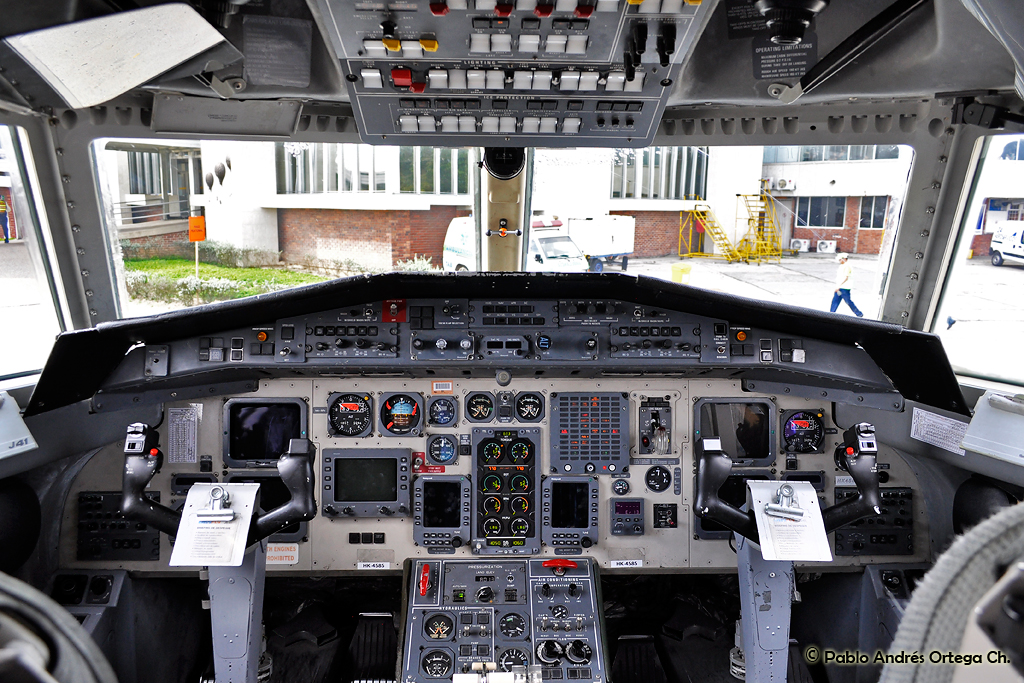
An EasyFly Jetstream 41 Cockpit.

Data from Jane's All the World's Aircraft 1997-98, Brassey's World Aircraft & Systems Directory 1996/97

General characteristics

- Crew: 3 (2 Pilots + Flight Attendant)
- Capacity: 29 passengers
- Length: 63 ft 2 in (19.25 m)
- Wingspan: 60 ft 0 in (18.29 m)
- Height: 18 ft 10 in (5.74 m)
- Wing area: 350.8 sq ft (32.59 m^{2})
- Airfoil: root: NACA 63A418; tip: NACA 63A412
- Empty weight: 14,272 lb (6,474 kg)
- Maximum zero-fuel weight: 21,400 lb (9,707 kg)
- Max takeoff weight: 24,000 lb (10,886 kg)
- Maximum ramp weight: 24,100 lb (10,932 kg)
- Maximum landing weight: 23,300 lb (10,569 kg)
- Fuel capacity: 727 imp gal (873 US gal; 3,305 L) / 5,960 lb (2,703 kg) maximum
- Powerplant: 2 × Allied Signal TPE331-14GR/HR turboprop engines, 1,650 shp (1,230 kW) each (handed GR / HR)
- Propellers: 5-bladed McCauley, 9 ft 6 in (2.9 m) diameter (handed GR / HR) constant-speed feathering metal propellers

Performance

- Maximum speed: 295 kn (339 mph, 546 km/h) at 20,000 ft (6,100 m)
- Cruise speed: 295 kn (339 mph, 546 km/h) max at 20,000 ft (6,100 m)

260 kn (299 mph; 482 km/h) at 20,000 ft (6,100 m) economical cruise

- Never exceed speed: 315 kn (362 mph, 583 km/h) CAS sea level to 17,400 ft (5,300 m)

M0.65 above 17,400 ft (5,300 m)

- Range: 774 nmi (891 mi, 1,433 km) with 29 pax + IFR reserves
- Service ceiling: 26,000 ft (7,900 m)
- Service ceiling on one engine: 15,000 ft (4,600 m)
- Rate of climb: 2,200 ft/min (11 m/s)
- Wing loading: 68.42 lb/sq ft (334.1 kg/m^{2})
- Power/mass: 0.1375 shp/lb (0.2260 kW/kg)
- Take-off run: 5,000 ft (1,500 m)
- Landing run: 4,200 ft (1,300 m)

Avionics
Honeywell avionics with four screen EFIS

== See also ==
Related development

- Jetstream 31

Aircraft of comparable role, configuration, and era

- Embraer EMB 120 Brasilia
- DHC-8 100/200
- Dornier 328
- Saab 340
- Short 360

== Bibliography ==
- Lambert, Mark. Jane's All The World's Aircraft 1993–94. Coulsden, UK:Jane's Data Division, 1993. ISBN 0-7106-1066-1.
- O'Toole, Kevin. "Prestwick seeks new work after J41 closure". Flight International, 4–10 October 1997, p. 4.
- Swanborough, Gordon. "Jetstream Jubilee". Air International, August 1991, Vol 41 No 2, pp. 73–79. Stamford, UK:Key Publishing. ISSN 0306-5634.
- Taylor, Michael, ed. Brassey's World Aircraft & Systems Directory 1996/97. London: Brassey's, 1996. ISBN 978-1-85753-198-5.
- Wilson, Stewart. Airliners of the World. Fyshwick, Australia: Aerospace Publications Pty Ltd., 1999. ISBN 978-1-875671-44-1.
