= Outline of Nepal =

Country in South Asia

The Flag of Nepal

The Emblem of Nepal

Orthographic projection of Nepal.

The following outline is provided as an overview of and topical guide to Nepal:

Federal Democratic Republic of Nepal – a landlocked sovereign state in South Asia. The country is bordered to the north by China, and to the south, east, and west by India. The Himalayas in the country's northern region has eight of the world's ten highest mountains, including Mount Everest, called Sagarmatha in Nepali.

== General reference ==
- Pronunciation: nɛpɑːl
- Common English country name: Nepal
- Official English country name: The Federal Democratic Republic of Nepal
- Common endonym(s): List of countries and capitals in native languages
- Official endonym(s): List of official endonyms of present-day nations and states
- Adjectival(s): Nepali
- Demonym(s): Nepalese (also 'Nepali')
- Etymology: Name of Nepal
- International rankings of Nepal
- ISO country codes: NP, NPL, 524
- ISO region codes: See ISO 3166-2:NP
- Internet country code top-level domain: .np

== Geography of Nepal ==
- Nepal is: a landlocked country
- Location:
  - Northern Hemisphere and Eastern Hemisphere
  - Eurasia
    - Asia
      - South Asia
        - Indian subcontinent
  - Time zone: Nepal Time (UTC+05:45)
  - Extreme points of Nepal
    - High: Mount Everest 8,848 m (29,029 ft) – highest point on Earth
  - Land boundaries: 2,926 km

India 1,690 km
China 1,236 km

- Coastline: none

- Nepal Geological Society
- Population of Nepal: 29,609,623(2019 estimate) – 51st most populous country
- Area of Nepal: 147,516 km^{2}
- Atlas of Nepal

=== Environment of Nepal ===
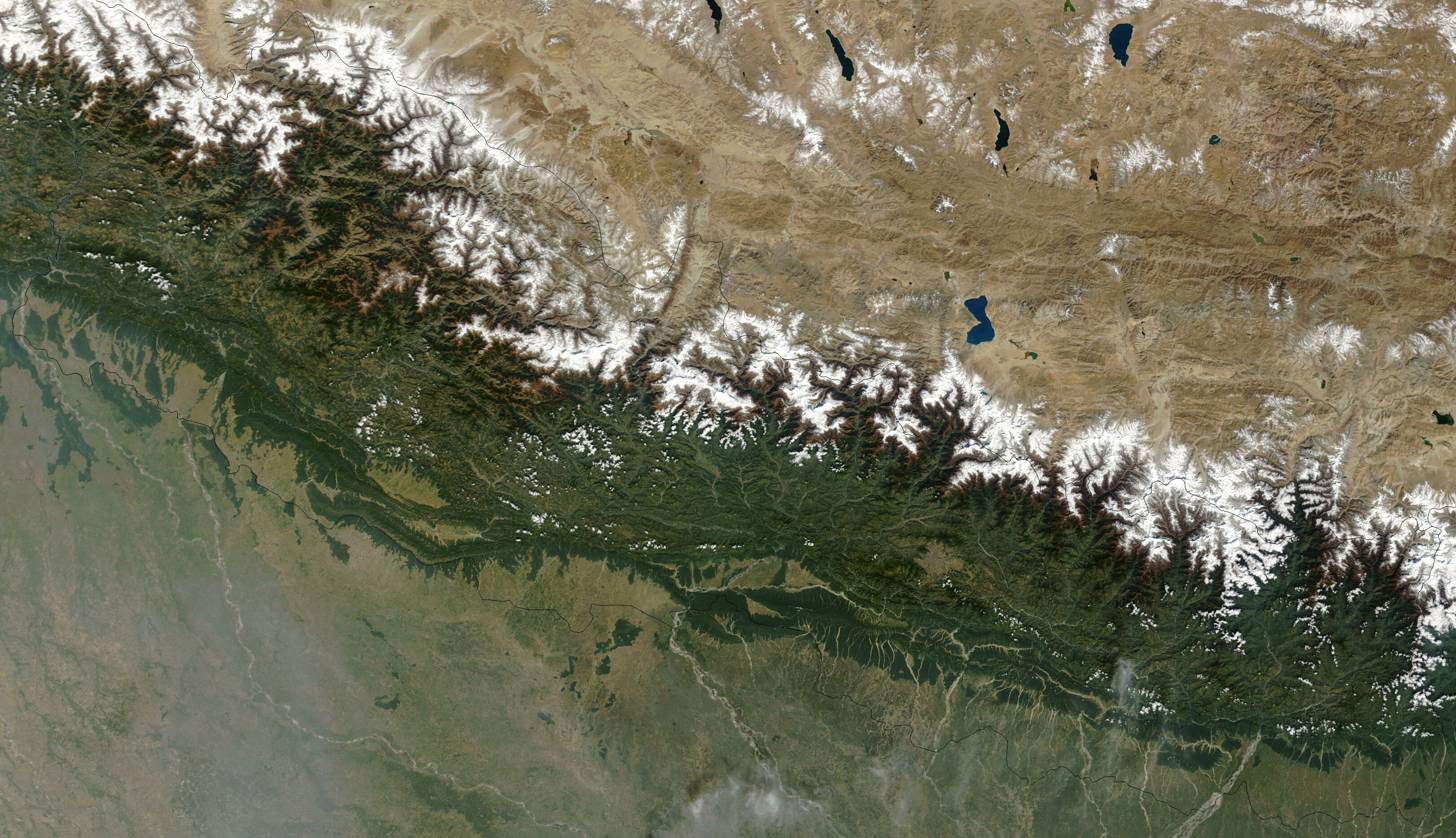
An enlargeable satellite image of Nepal

- Climate of Nepal
- Natural disasters in Nepal
  - 2007 South Asian floods
  - April 2015 Nepal earthquake
  - 2026 Nepal floods
- Environmental issues in Nepal
- Renewable energy in Nepal
  - Hydropower in Nepal
  - Solar power in Nepal
- Geology of Nepal
- Protected areas of Nepal
  - National parks in Nepal
    - Chitwan National Park
    - Langtang National Park
    - Bardia National Park
    - Sagarmatha National Park
    - Khaptad National Park
    - Rara National Park
    - Shey Phoksundo National Park
    - Makalu Barun National Park
    - Shivapuri Nagarjun National Park
    - Banke National Park
    - Shuklaphanta National Park
    - Parsa National Park
    - Chhayanath National Park
  - Wildlife reserves in Nepal
    - Koshi Tappu Wildlife Reserve
  - Hunting reserves in Nepal
    - Dhorpatan Hunting Reserve

==== Biota of Nepal ====
Wildlife of Nepal

===== Fauna of Nepal =====
- Birds of Nepal
  - Asian openbill stork
  - Barred buttonquail
  - Black stork
  - Black-crowned night heron
  - Black-headed ibis
  - Black-necked stork
  - Cattle egret
  - Cheer pheasant
  - Chinese pond heron
  - Great cormorant
  - Great egret
  - Great hornbill
  - Greater adjutant
  - Indian peafowl
  - Indian pond heron
  - Lesser whistling duck
  - Little cormorant
  - Oriental darter
  - Painted stork
  - Purple heron
  - Sarus crane
  - Scarlet minivet
  - Spot-billed pelican
  - Sultan tit
  - Woolly-necked stork
  - Spiny babbler
- Mammals of Nepal
  - Bengal fox
  - Clouded leopard
  - Corsac fox
  - Marbled cat
  - Red panda
  - Snow leopard
  - Tibetan fox
- Reptiles of Nepal
  - Trimeresurus septentrionalis
  - Bengal monitor
  - Indotestudo elongata
  - Yellow monitor
  - Cyrtodactylus nepalensis
  - Gloydius himalayanus

===== Flora of Nepal =====
- Garden angelica
- Juglans regia (okhar/English walnut)
- Luculia gratissima
- Meconopsis villosa
- Persicaria affinis
- Rhododendron arboreum
- Ruellia capitata

==== Natural geographic features of Nepal ====
Geography of Nepal

- List of World Heritage Sites in Nepal

===== Glaciers of Nepal =====
- Hunku Glacier
- Khumbu Glacier
- Khumbu Icefall

===== Rivers of Nepal =====
structured list

===== Lakes of Nepal =====
  - Begnas Lake
  - Fewa Lake
  - Gajedi Taal
  - Gosaikunda
  - Lausha Taal
  - Rara Lake
  - Khaste Lake
  - Phoksundo Lake
  - Tilicho Lake
  - Rupa Lake
  - Jhilmila Lake
  - Ghodaghodi Tal
  - Rani Pokhari
  - Khaptad Lake

===== Mountains of Nepal =====
- List of mountains in Nepal
  - Trekking peak
- List of Ultras of the Himalayas
- Himalayan sub-ranges
  - Far west
    - Changla Himal – transhimalayan range (on Nepal-Tibet Autonomous Region border)
    - Gurans Himal
      - Api (mountain)
      - Saipal
  - upper Karnali basin
    - Kanti Himal – transhimalayan border range
    - Kanjiroba Himal – south of Dolpa
    - Kagmara Lekh – south of Kanjiroba, north of Dhaulagiri

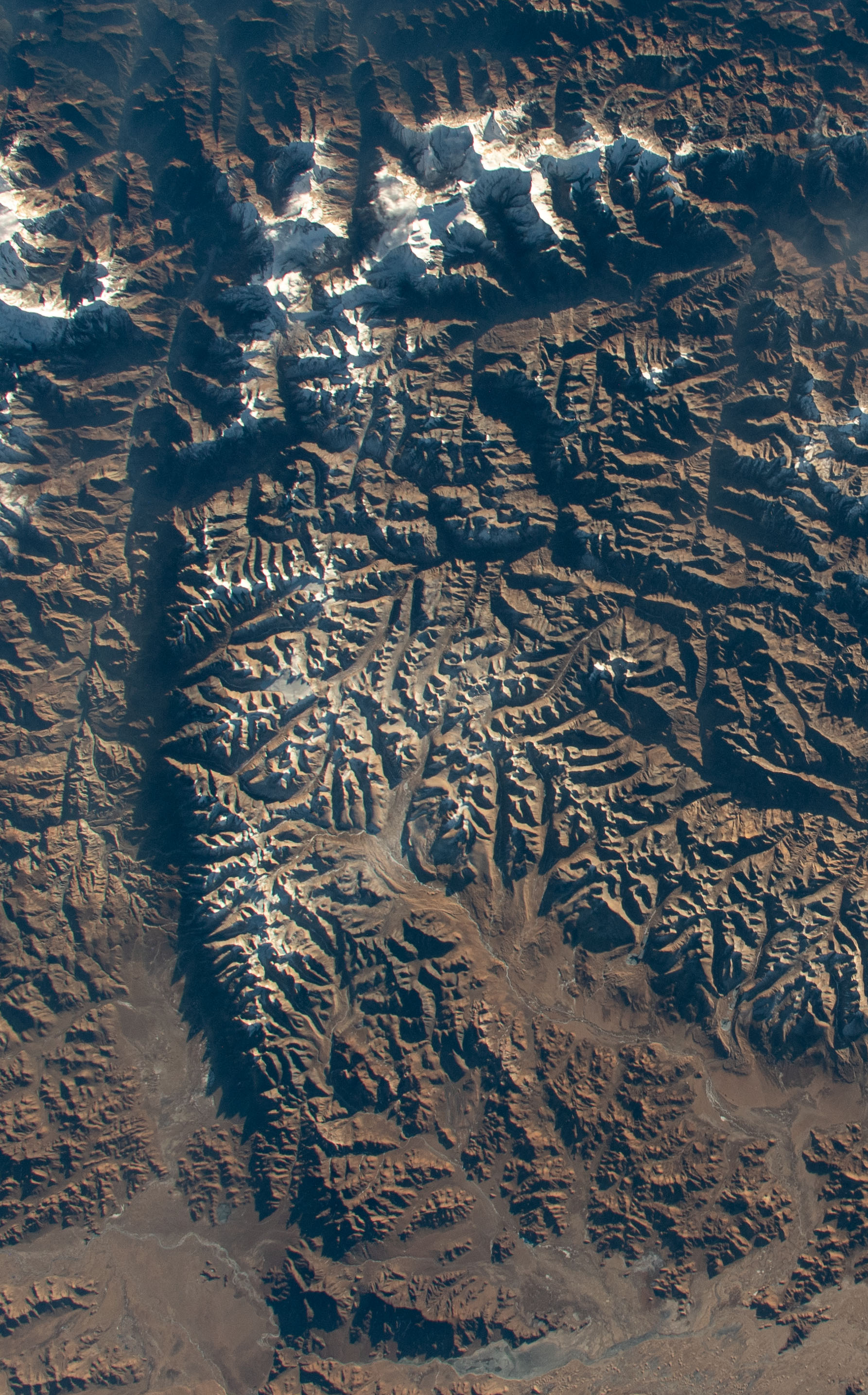
Kali Gandaki Valley, Dhaulagiri Himal, Mustang Himal, Gautam Himal (South is up!)

  - west of Kaligandaki River
    - Gautam Himal – transhimalayan border range
    - Mukut Himal – 6,000m and 5,000m peaks northeast of Dhaulagiri II
    - Dhaulagiri – DI-DVI, Tukucha, Churen, Putha Hiunchuli, Gurja, Ghustang, Sita Chuchura, Junction Pk., Myagdi Matha
      - Dwari Lekh – lower peaks at western end of Dhaulagiris
  - east of Kaligandaki
    - Damodar and Peri Himal – transhimalayan border range
    - Annapurna
      - Hiunchuli
      - Machapuchare
      - Nilgiri Himal
      - Singu Chuli
      - Tharpu Chuli
      - Tilicho Peak
  - North of Gorkha
    - Mansiri Himal
      - Himalchuli
      - Manaslu
      - Ngadi Chuli
      - Chamar
      - Ganesh Himal
        - Ganesh NW (Ganesh II/III)
        - Salasungo
        - Yangra
  - North of Kathmandu
    - Langtang Himal
      - Dorje Lakpa
      - Dragmarpo Ri
      - Langtang Lirung
      - Yala Peak
  - west of Arun River
    - Rolwaling Himal
      - Gauri Sankar
      - Melungtse
    - Mahalangur Himal
      - Ama Dablam
      - Baruntse
      - Chamlang
      - Cholatse
      - Cho Oyu
      - Cho Polu
      - Everest
        - Everest Base Camp
        - South Col
        - Lhotse
        - Nuptse
      - Gyachung Kang
      - Imja Tse
      - Kala Patthar
      - Kanguru
      - Khumbutse
      - Kongde Ri
      - Kusum Kangguru
      - Makalu
      - Mera Peak
      - Nirekha
      - Num Ri
      - Pokalde
      - Pumori
      - Taboche
      - Thamserku
  - east of Arun
    - Janak Himal
    - Kangchenjunga
      - Jannu
- Mahabharat Range
- Siwaliks
  - Dundwa Range

=== Provinces of Nepal ===
Provinces of Nepal

==== Administrative divisions of Nepal ====
- Provinces of Nepal
  - Districts of Nepal
    - Municipalities of Nepal
    - Gaupalikas of Nepal

==== Koshi Province ====
- Khotang District
- Okhaldhunga District
- Solukhumbu District
- Udayapur District
- Bhojpur District
- Dhankuta District
- Morang District
- Sankhuwasabha District
- Sunsari District
- Terhathum District
- Ilam District
- Jhapa District
- Panchthar District
- Taplejung District

==== Madhesh Province ====
- Saptari District
- Siraha District
- Bara District
- Parsa District
- Rautahat District
- Dhanusa District
- Sarlahi District
- Mahottari District

==== Bagmati Province ====
- Bhaktapur District
- Dhading District
- Lalitpur District
- Kathmandu District
- Kavrepalanchok District
- Nuwakot District
- Rasuwa District
- Sindhulpalchok District
- Chitwan District
- Makwanpur District
- Dolakha District
- Ramechhap District
- Sindhuli District

==== Gandaki Province ====
- Baglung District
- Mustang District
- Myagdi District
- Parbat District
- Gorkha District
- Kaski District
- Lamjung District
- Manang District
- Syangja District
- Tanahu District
- Nawalpur District

==== Lumbini Province ====
- Arghakhanchi District
- Gulmi District
- Kapilvastu District
- Parasi District
- Palpa District
- Rupandehi District
- Banke District
- Bardiya District
- Dang District
- Pyuthan District
- Rolpa District
- Eastern Rukum District

==== Karnali Province ====
- Salyan District
- Dolpa District
- Humla District
- Jumla District
- Kalikot District
- Mugu District
- Dailekh District
- Jajarkot District
- Surkhet District
- Karnali Zone

==== Sudurpashchim Province ====
- Baitadi District
- Dadeldhura District
- Darchula District
- Kanchanpur District
- Achham District
- Bajhang District
- Bajura District
- Doti District
- Kailali District

===== Municipalities of Nepal =====
- Capital of Nepal: Kathmandu
- List of cities in Nepal

== Demography of Nepal ==
- Ethnic groups of Nepal
- Religion in Nepal

== Government and politics of Nepal ==
- Form of government: Secular federal parliamentary multi-party representative democratic republic
- Capital of Nepal: Kathmandu
- Elections in Nepal
  - 1959 | 1971 | 1981 | 1986 | 1991 | 1994 | 1999 | 2008 | 2013 | 2017
- Political parties in Nepal
  - Nepal Communist Party
  - Nepali Congress
  - People's Socialist Party, Nepal

=== Branches of the government of Nepal ===
Government of Nepal

==== Executive branch of the government of Nepal ====
- Head of state: President of Nepal
- Vice President of Nepal
- Head of government: Prime Minister of Nepal,
  - List of prime ministers of Nepal
- Cabinet of Nepal
  - MOPE

==== Legislative branch of the government of Nepal ====
- Federal parliament of Nepal
  - Rastriya Sabha (National Assembly) – upper house of the parliament
  - Pratinidhi Sabha (House of Representatives) – lower house of the parliament

==== Judicial branch of the government of Nepal ====
Judiciary of Nepal

- Supreme Court of Nepal
- High Courts of Nepal
- District Courts of Nepal

=== Foreign relations of Nepal ===
Foreign relations of Nepal

- Diplomatic missions in Nepal
- Diplomatic missions of Nepal
- BIMSTEC
- Bhupalis
- Britain-India-Nepal Tripartite Agreement
- Foreign aid to Nepal
- Nepal Embassy, Riyadh
- Nepalese non-government organisations in Hong Kong

==== International organization membership ====
The Federal Democratic Republic of Nepal is a member of:

- African Union/United Nations Hybrid operation in Darfur (UNAMID)
- Asian Development Bank (ADB)
- Bay of Bengal Initiative for Multi-Sectoral Technical and Economic Cooperation (BIMSTEC)
- Colombo Plan (CP)
- Food and Agriculture Organization (FAO)
- Group of 77 (G77)
- International Bank for Reconstruction and Development (IBRD)
- International Chamber of Commerce (ICC)
- International Civil Aviation Organization (ICAO)
- International Criminal Police Organization (Interpol)
- International Development Association (IDA)
- International Federation of Red Cross and Red Crescent Societies (IFRCS)
- International Finance Corporation (IFC)
- International Fund for Agricultural Development (IFAD)
- International Labour Organization (ILO)
- International Maritime Organization (IMO)
- International Monetary Fund (IMF)
- International Olympic Committee (IOC)
- International Organization for Migration (IOM)
- International Organization for Standardization (ISO) (correspondent)
- International Red Cross and Red Crescent Movement (ICRM)
- International Telecommunication Union (ITU)
- International Telecommunications Satellite Organization (ITSO)
- International Trade Union Confederation (ITUC)
- Inter-Parliamentary Union (IPU)
- Multilateral Investment Guarantee Agency (MIGA)
- Nonaligned Movement (NAM)
- Organisation for the Prohibition of Chemical Weapons (OPCW)
- South Asia Co-operative Environment Programme (SACEP)
- South Asian Association for Regional Cooperation (SAARC)
- United Nations (UN)
- United Nations Conference on Trade and Development (UNCTAD)
- United Nations Educational, Scientific, and Cultural Organization (UNESCO)
- United Nations Industrial Development Organization (UNIDO)
- United Nations Integrated Mission in Timor-Leste (UNMIT)
- United Nations Interim Force in Lebanon (UNIFIL)
- United Nations Mission in Liberia (UNMIL)
- United Nations Mission in the Central African Republic and Chad (MINURCAT)
- United Nations Mission in the Sudan (UNMIS)
- United Nations Observer Mission in Georgia (UNOMIG)
- United Nations Operation in Cote d'Ivoire (UNOCI)
- United Nations Organization Mission in the Democratic Republic of the Congo (MONUC)
- United Nations Stabilization Mission in Haiti (MINUSTAH)
- United Nations Truce Supervision Organization (UNTSO)
- Universal Postal Union (UPU)
- World Confederation of Labour (WCL)
- World Customs Organization (WCO)
- World Federation of Trade Unions (WFTU)
- World Health Organization (WHO)
- World Intellectual Property Organization (WIPO)
- World Meteorological Organization (WMO)
- World Tourism Organization (UNWTO)
- World Trade Organization (WTO)

=== Law and order in Nepal ===
Law of Nepal

- Capital punishment in Nepal
- Constitution of Nepal
- Crime in Nepal
- Human rights in Nepal
  - LGBT rights in Nepal
  - Freedom of religion in Nepal
- Law enforcement in Nepal
  - Armed Police Force Nepal
  - Nepalese Police Force
- Nepal citizenship law
- Sarbochha Adalat

=== Military of Nepal ===
Military of Nepal

- Command
  - Commander-in-chief: President of Nepal
    - Ministry of Defence
- Forces
  - Army of Nepal
    - Nepalese Army Air Service
- Military history of Nepal
  - Armed Police Force Nepal
  - Gurkha
  - Brigade of Gurkhas
  - Britain-India-Nepal Tripartite Agreement
  - Nepalese Police Force
- Military ranks of Nepal

=== Provincial government ===
- Governor
- Chief Minister
- Pradesh Sabha
- Provincial governments of Nepal

=== Local government ===
- Local government in Nepal
- Mayors in Nepal

== History of Nepal ==
- Amshuverma
- Arimalla
- Bhrikuti
- Chabahil
- Congress Mukti Sena
- Darjeeling
- Five-year plans of Nepal
- Toni Hagen
- Garhwal
- Jana Aandolan
- Jang Bahadur
- Jayasthitimalla
- Kot massacre
- Kumaon
- Licchavi
- Mustang (kingdom)
- Nepal during World War I
- Nepalese Civil War
- Nepalese mohar
- Rana autocracy
- Rana dynasty
- Sonam Lhundrup
- Sugauli Treaty
- Sikkim
- Treaty of Titalia
- Unification of Nepal

=== History of Nepal, by period ===
Timeline of Nepalese history

- Sino-Nepalese War
- Anglo-Nepalese War, aka Gurkha War (1814–1816)
- Nepalese–Tibetan War
- Nepal in World War II
- 1950 Indo-Nepal Treaty of Peace and Friendship
- 1990 People's Movement
- April 1992 general strike in Nepal
- 2004 in Nepal
- 2006 democracy movement in Nepal
- Nepalese Civil War

=== History of Nepal, by subject ===
- Democracy movement in Nepal
- Military history of Nepal

==== Massacres in Nepal ====
- Kot massacre
- Nepalese royal massacre

==== Previous governments of Nepal ====
- National Assembly of Nepal
- Nepal House of Representatives
- Parliament of Nepal

===== Nepalese monarchs =====
- Nepalese monarchy
- Birendra of Nepal
- Dipendra of Nepal
- Girvan Yuddha Bikram Shah Deva
- Gyanendra of Nepal
- Mahendra of Nepal
- Pratap Singh Shah
- Prithvi of Nepal
- Prithvi Narayan Shah
- Rana Bahadur Shah
- Surendra of Nepal
- Tribhuvan of Nepal
- Tribhuvan

===== Prime Ministers of Nepal =====
- List of prime ministers of Nepal
- Man Mohan Adhikari
- Bishweshwar Prasad Koirala
- Jang Bahadur
- Kirti Nidhi Bista
- Girija Prasad Koirala
- Krishna Prasad Bhattarai
- Lokendra Bahadur Chand
- Marich Man Singh Shrestha
- Mohan Shamsher Jang Bahadur Rana
- Sher Bahadur Deuba
- Surya Bahadur Thapa

== Culture of Nepal ==
- Architecture of Nepal
  - Bhimfedi
  - Bhote Koshi Project
  - Boudhanath
  - Chabahil
  - European Union Culture Centre Nepal
  - Kopan Monastery
  - Maya Devi Temple, Lumbini
- Media in Nepal
- Museums in Nepal
  - National Museum of Nepal
  - Nepal Olympic Museum
- National symbols of Nepal
  - Coat of arms of Nepal
  - Flag of Nepal
  - National anthem of Nepal
- Nepal Dalit Utthan Manch
- Nepalese sculpture
- Prostitution in Nepal
- Public holidays in Nepal
- Records of Nepal

=== Art in Nepal ===
- Cinema of Nepal
  - Rajamati
  - Chipa: Nipa:
  - Silu (film)
- Literature of Nepal
- Television in Nepal
- Theatre in Nepal
- Nepalese handicrafts

==== Music of Nepal ====
- Music of Sikkim
- Narayan Gopal
- Nepali rock
- Newari Music

===== Nepalese musical instruments =====
- Damphu
- Dhime
- Dholak
- Jhyali
- Maadal
- Sarangi

===== Nepalese poets =====
- Abhi Subedi
- Bairagi Kainla
- Bhupi Sherchan
- Gopal Prasad Rimal
- Krishnabhooshan Bal
- Lakshmiprasad Devkota
- Suman Pokhrel
- Ishwar Ballav
- Hari Bhakta Katuwal

===== Nepalese musicians =====
- Ani Choying Dolma
- Jhalak Man Gandarbha

====== Nepalese flautists ======
- Manose Singh

=== Cuisine of Nepal ===
- Dido and Gundruk
- Chiura
- Dal bhaat
- Oil cake
- Raksi

==== Newari cuisine ====
- Newari Cuisine
- Ailaa
- Baji
- Chataamari
- Chwelaa
- Dhau
- Jaa
- Kachilaa
- Lakhamari
- Sanyaa
- Sanyaakhunya
- Thwon
- Yomari

=== Festivals of Nepal ===
- Buddha Jayanti (Baishak Purnima)
- Gunla (Gunla Bajan)
- Losar ( Gyalpo Lhosar, Sonam Lhosar, Tamu Lhosar)
- Dashain
- Jana Baha Dyah Jatra
- Jatra (Indra jatra-Yenya, Ghode jatra, Gai Jatra, Bisket Jatra)
- Maghe Sankranti
- Makar Sankranti
- Naga Panchami
- Samyak
- Sa Paru
- Teej
- Tihar (festival)
- Toran La (Thakali)
- Uttarayana
- Holi

=== Languages of Nepal ===
- Nepali language
- Awadhi language
- Bhojpuri language
- Bahing language
- Kham language
- Limbu language
- Magar language
- Maithili language
- Mundari language
- Nepal Bhasa
- Tamang language
- Tharu languages
- Santali language
- Pali Bhasa

=== Organisations based in Nepal ===
- ICIMOD
- Nepal Mountaineering Association
- Nepal Scouts
- Nepal Olympic Committee
- All Nepal Football Association

==== Non-profit organizations based in Nepal ====
- Madan Puraskar Pustakalaya
- National Museum of Nepal
- Nepal Mathematical Society
- Nepal Physical Society
- Association for the protection of Children (APC-NEPAL)

==== Volunteer organizations in Nepal ====
- Association of Youth Organizations Nepal

=== People of Nepal ===
People of Nepal

==== Ethnic groups in Nepal ====
- Badi People
- Bahing
- Chepang people
- Dhobi
- Ethnic groups of South Asia
- Gandarbha
- Gurung
- Hayu
- Jirel
- Kami (caste)
- Kham Magar
- Kirant
- Kiratas
- Kusunda
- Lepcha people
- Limbu people
- Magar people
- Newar
- Rai (ethnic group)
- Ranjitkar
- Sherpa people
- Tamang
- Thakali
- Thami
- Tharu people
- Yadav
- Yakkha
- Santal
- Shakya

==== Social groups of Nepal ====
===== Dalit =====
- Dalit Nationalism
- 2006 Dalit protests in Maharashtra
- Adi Dravida
- Bahujan Samaj Party
- Bahujan Samaj Party (Nepal)
- Balmiki
- Bhangi
- Chamar
- Chandala
- Dalit
- Dalit Bahujan Shramik Union
- Dalit Buddhist movement
- Dalit Freedom Network
- Dhobi
- Domba
- Hari (outcaste)
- Holeya
- Kherlanji Massacre
- Kinnaraya
- List of Scheduled Tribes in India
- Madiga
- Mahar
- Mala (caste)
- Nalavar
- Paraiyar
- Pulayar
- Kanshi Ram
- Rodiya
- Sakkiliar
- Scheduled Caste and Scheduled Tribe (Prevention of Atrocities) Act, 1989
- Scheduled Castes and Tribes
- Shudra

=== Religion in Nepal ===
Religion in Nepal – over 30% of the population follow Hinduism (see Hinduism in Nepal below).

==== Buddhism in Nepal ====
- Newar Buddhism
- Lumbini
- Buddhist pilgrimage sites in Nepal

===== Buddhist temples in Nepal =====
- Amitabha Monastery
- Benchen Monastery
- Boudhanath
- Chhairo gompa
- Hiranya Varna Mahavihar (Golden Temple)
- Ka-Nying Shedrub Ling
- Kindo Baha (Kirttana Mahavihara)
- Kopan Monastery
- Maya Devi Temple, Lumbini
- Pema Namding Monastery
- Phugmoche Monastery
- Pranidhipurna Mahavihar
- Sambha gompa
- Seto Gumba
- Swayambhunath
- Tengboche Monastery
- Tergar Osel Ling Monastery
- Tharlam Monastery
- List of Buddhist temples in Nepal
- List of Mahaviharas of Newar Buddhism
- List of monasteries in Nepal
- List of Stupas in Nepal

==== Hinduism in Nepal ====
Hinduism in Nepal

===== Hindu temples in Nepal =====
- Guhyeshwari Temple
- Pashupatinath temple
- Suryavinayak Temple
- Dakshinkali Temple
- Kamalvinayak Temple
- Mahankal Temple
- Gokarna Mahadev Temple
- Sankata Temple
- Batuk Bhairav Temple
- Jalvinayak Temple
- Manakamana of Tumlingtar, at Tumlingtar
- Bhadrakali Temple
- Bhadrakali Temple, Pokhara
- Tal Barahi
- Bindhyabasini Temple
- Akala Devi Temple, Pokhara
- Vimshenthan Temple
- Gorakhnath Temple
- Swargadwari
- Ramjanaki Temple(Janakpur)
- Pindeshwor (Dharan)
- Budhasubba (Dharan)
- Dantakali (Dharan)
- Supa Deurali (Arghakhanchi)
- Bageshowri Temple, Nepalgunj

==== Other religions in Nepal ====
- Christianity in Nepal
  - Protestants in Nepal
  - Roman Catholicism in Nepal
- Islam in Nepal
- Judaism in Nepal
- Sikhism in Nepal

==== Other temples in Nepal ====
- Changu Narayan
- Kumari
- Swayambhunath
- Pashupatinath
- Muktinath
- Guhyeshwari Temple
- Sobha Baghwati
- Swargadwari
- Kasthamandap
- Janaki Mandir
- Ankuri Mahadev
- Dakshinkali Temple
- Chandannath Mandir

=== Sports in Nepal ===
- Nepal at the Olympics
- Nepal at the Asian Games
- Football in Nepal
- Cricket in Nepal
- Volleyball in Nepal

==== Major Sports Leagues ====
- Martyr's Memorial A-Division League (Football)
- Nepal National League (Football)
- Everest Premier League (Cricket)
- Dhangadhi Premier League (Cricket)
- Kwiks Basketball League (Basketball)

==== World Heritage Sites in Nepal ====
- Lumbini (Birth Place of Buddha)
- Chitwan National Park
- Sagarmatha National Park
- Swoyambhunath
- Boudhanath
- Pashupatinath Temple
- Bhaktapur Durbar Square
- Kathmandu Durbar Square
- Patan Durbar Square
- Changu Narayan Temple
- Sagarmatha National Park

== Economy and infrastructure of Nepal ==
- Economic rank, by nominal GDP (2007): 118th (one hundred and eighteenth)
- Agriculture in Nepal
  - Nepalese cocoyam
  - Nepalese sorghum
- Currency of Nepal: Rupee
  - ISO 4217: NPR
  - Nepalese banknotes
  - Nepalese rupee
- Economic development in Nepal
  - Bhote Koshi Project
  - Five-year plans of Nepal
  - Nepal Risk Reduction Consortium
- Energy in Nepal
  - Energy policy of Nepal
  - Oil industry in Nepal
- Foreign aid to Nepal
- Mining in Nepal
- Nepal Stock Exchange
- Tourism in Nepal
- Tourism in Lumbini Province
- Tourism in Kathmandu
- Tourism in Pokhara
- Tourism in Mithila
- Water supply and sanitation in Nepal
- Natural resources of Nepal
  - Mineral resources of Nepal

=== Banking in Nepal ===
- Agriculture Development Bank
- Citizens Bank
- Everest Bank
- Global IME Bank
- Himalayan Bank Limited
- Kumari Bank Limited
- Laxmi Sunrise Bank
- Machhapuchchhre Bank
- Nabil Bank
- Nepal Bank
- Nepal Investment Mega Bank
- Nepal Rastra Bank
- Nepal SBI Bank
- NIC Asia Bank
- NMB Bank
- Prabhu Bank
- Prime Commercial Bank
- Rastriya Banijya Bank
- Sanima Bank
- Siddhartha Bank
- Standard Chartered Bank

=== Communications in Nepal ===
Communications in Nepal

== Telecommunications in Nepal ==
- Ncell
- Nepal Telecom
- SmartCell
- Hello Nepal

=== Nepalese media ===
Media of Nepal

==== Internet in Nepal ====
- .np
- Nepal Internet Exchange
- Network Service Providers in Nepal

==== Newspapers published in Nepal ====
- Himalayan Times
- Kantipur Publications
- Republica
- Nepali Times
- Nepal Samacharpatra
- Nepal Traveller Publications

==== Radio in Nepal ====
- Radio Nepal
- Radio Kantipur
- Radio Upatyaka

==== Television in Nepal ====
- Sagarmatha TV
- ABC
- Image Channel
- NTV 2 Metro
- Nepal Television
- Kantipur Television
- Galaxy 4k TV
- Mountain Television
- Avenues

=== Online News Media in Nepal ===
- Online khabar
- Ratopati
- Setopati

=== Companies of Nepal ===
- Nepal Derivative Exchange Limited
- Laxmi Bank Limited
- Himalayan Bank Limited
- Nabil Bank
- Nepal Bank Limited
- Nepal Investment Bank Limited
- Nepal Rastra Bank
- Nepal Stock Exchange
- Nepal Telecom
- Rastriya Banijya Bank
- Yomari
- United Group (P) Ltd.
- COSELI
- Nabil Investment Banking Ltd.
- Sanima Capital Ltd.

=== Trade unions of Nepal ===
- Trekking company in Nepal
- All Nepal Trade Union Congress
- All Nepal Trade Union Federation (Revolutionary)
- Democratic Confederation of Nepalese Trade Unions
- General Federation of Nepalese Trade Unions
- Independent Transport Workers Association of Nepal
- Nepal Independent Hotel Workers Union
- Nepal Independent Workers Union
- Nepal Progressive Trade Union Federation
- Nepal Trade Union Congress
- Trekking Workers Association of Nepal

=== Transport in Nepal ===
- AH2
- Rail transport in Nepal

==== Aviation in Nepal ====
- Aeronautical Society of Nepal
- Airports in Nepal

==== Airlines of Nepal ====
- Buddha Air
- Flying Dragon Airlines
- Gorkha Airlines
- Nepal Airlines
- Shree Airlines
- Sita Air
- Yeti Airlines

==== Defunct airlines of Nepal ====
- Agni Air
- Air Ananya
- Air Nepal International
- Asian Airlines
- Base Air
- Cosmic Air
- Everest Air
- Karnali Air
- Impro Airways
- Mero Air
- Mountain Air (Nepal)
- Necon Air
- Shangri-La Air
- Skyline Airways

==== Aviation incidents in Nepal ====
- PIA Flight 268
- Thai Airways International Flight 311

== Education in Nepal ==
- Institute of Medicine, Nepal
- Ministry Of Education, Keshar Mahal, Kathmandu
- Institute of Engineering
- Nepalese Children's Education Fund
- Nepal Village Foundation

=== Schools in Nepal ===
- List of schools in Nepal

=== Universities and colleges in Nepal ===
- Kathmandu University
- Pokhara University
- Tribhuvan University
- Purbanchal University
- Mid West University
- Agriculture and Forestry University
- Nepal Sanskrit University

== Health in Nepal ==
- Health care in Nepal
- Institute of Medicine, Nepal
- Manipal Teaching Hospital
- Nepalese Journal of Ophthalmology

== See also ==
- List of international rankings
- Member state of the United Nations
- Nepalese honey with tejpat oil
- Outline of Asia
- Outline of geography
