= Mero =

Mero may refer to:

== Places ==
- Mero, Dominica
- Mero River
- Mero Mound Group (Diamond Bluff Site), an archeological site

== People ==
=== Surname ===
- Bruhs Mero (1911–1995) American dancer and gay man
- Dave Meros (born 1956), American bass guitar player
- Joel Mero (born 1995), Finnish footballer
- Joseph Mero (born c. 1965), American pair skater
- László Mérő (born 1949), Jewish Hungarian research psychologist and author
- Marc Mero (born 1960), American amateur boxer and professional wrestler
- Muhammad Mustafa Mero (born 1941), Syrian politician, former Prime Minister of Syria (2000–2003)
- The Kid Mero, or Joel Martinez (born 1983), Dominican-American writer, comedian
- Rena Mero (born 1967), better known as Sable, American model, actress, and retired professional wrestler
- Vittorio Mero (1974–2002), Italian footballer
- Yolanda Mero (1887–1963), Hungarian-American musician

=== Given name ===
- Mero (rapper) (born 2000), Turkish-German rapper

== Business and economy ==
- MERO ČR, operator of the Czech part of the Druzhba pipeline
- Mero Air
- Mero Mobile
- Mero-Schmidlin, English construction business

== Science ==
- Mero (fish)

== Music ==
- "The Mero", a song by Pete St. John
- "Star Mero Mero Heart", a song by Masayo Kurata
- Los Mero Meros, a compilation album presented by Lennox

== Others ==
- Meroune "Mero" Lorelei, a character in the Japanese manga series Monster Musume
- USS Mero (SS-378), a Balao-class submarine, was a ship of the United States Navy

== See also ==
- Meros (disambiguation)
- Plastic Mero, a public sculpture in Funchal, Portugal, by Bordalo II
- A Mero Hajur 2, a Nepali musical romantic movie directed by Jharana Thapa
- A Mero Hajur 3 (English: Oh My Dear 3), a Nepali romantic comedy-drama film directed by Jharana Thapa
- Desus & Mero (2016 TV series), an American television late-night talk show on Viceland hosted by Desus Nice and The Kid Mer
- Desus & Mero (2019 TV series), an American television late-night talk show series on Showtime hosted by comedians Desus Nice and The Kid Mer
- Kohi Mero, a 2010 Nepali film directed by Alok Nemban
- Mero Euta Saathi Cha (English title: I Have One Special Friend), a 2009 Nepali movie
