= Ajeya Sumargi =

- Born: September 1, 1963 (age 63); Hetauda, Makawanpur, Province 3,Nepal
- Occupation: Chairman Muktishree Pvt. Ltd.
- Spouse: Samjhana Aryal "Ashmita Sumargi"
- Children: 2
- Parent(s): Madhav Raj Sumargi and Bisho Kanti Kalabati Sumargi

Ajeya Raj Sumargi is chair of the Muktishree group of companies. He is also the executive director of the Nepal Satellite Telecom Pvt. Ltd. (Hello Nepal), which is a GSM-based European JV cellular services provider company launched in 2007 from the Mid-West region of Nepal.

He is also the promoting director of the telecommunication company the Ncell Pvt. Ltd. (formerly Spice Nepal Pvt. Ltd.) with the brand name Mero Mobile, now Ncell, which started its operations with an investment of two billion.

== Investments ==
On 22 December 2013 Sumargi announced at a press release that his company would invest 23 billion NRS. The investments would be made for Nepal Satellite Telecom, a new five star hotel and for the new cement plant.

== Social service ==
His Muktishree group of companies was reported in 2016 to be planning a project in partnership with Rural Shores, India and the Inclusive Ventures Limited, which aims to empower Nepali rural youth through skill development training and provide employment opportunities.

== Controversies ==
Sumargi has been involved in controversy concerning money laundering in Nepal. He has been in court for this multiple times.

== Personal life ==
His house in his hometown Hetauda was torched by protesters during the 2025 Nepalese Gen Z protests.
