= Subisu =

Internet service providers in Nepal

Subisu cablenet Ltd.
- Company type: Limited
- Industry: ISPs
- Founded: 2001
- Headquarters: Kathmandu, Nepal
- Area served: Nepal
- Services: Fiber internet, cable internet, digital TV
- Number of employees: 1500+
- Website: subisu.net.np

Subisu Cablenet Ltd. is a Nepalese Internet Service Provider company located in Kathmandu, Nepal, and was established in 2000. Subisu employs over 1500 full-time employees, of which around 900 are technical and around 700 are non-technical. As of 2023, the company has over 235,000 customers. It has coverage in all 77 districts of Nepal. Subisu primarily provides cable and fiber internet and digital TV services through a hybrid fiber-coaxial (HFCC) network.

== Infrastructure ==
Optical fiber cable (OFC) is used by Subisu to transmit TV channels and fiber connectivity. Its HFC network uses coaxial cable laid with MPLS (Multi-Label Protocol Switching) and a redundant metropolitan access network. The network's headend is in Baluwatar, Kathmandu, and spreads across major locations in the valley.

== Technology ==
Data over Cable Service Interface Specifications (aka DOCSIS) 3.0 is standard technology certified by Cable labs. The DOCSIS 3.0 (Annex B) standard provides 42 Mbit/s per channel (theoretically) and 37 Mpbs (practically) downstream per channel. Downstream can bond up to eight channels, which increases the downstream throughput up to (37 × 8) and 27 Mbit/s upstream bandwidth per channel. This is the standard cable modem protocol established by MCNS for bi-directional transfer of Internet Protocol (IP) traffic over cable. Subisu uses Metropolitan Access Network (MAN) technology for its optical fiber cable services.

== Services ==
- MPLS Applications
- Enterprise Internet
- Broadband Internet through FTTH based on GPON
- WAN Ethernet
- DWDM Wavelength Services
- EoSDH
- Wholesale IP transit
- Manages services
- Network Security Solution
- Digital Clear TV Services and Cable Internet

== See also ==
- Nepal Telecom
- Telecommunications in Nepal
