= NCEF =

NCEF may refer to:

- National Clearinghouse for Educational Facilities
- Nepalese Children's Education Fund
