= Ajeya (given name) =

Ajeya is a masculine given name. Notable people with the name include:

- Ajeya Pratap Singh, Indian politician
- Ajeya Sumargi, businessman
