= Meros =

Meros may refer to: Meros is Greek for a part, portion, share.

== People with the surname ==
- Dave Meros, American musician who played bass guitar for Spock's Beard
- Mike Meros, American musician who played keyboard for the Beach Boys

== See also ==
- Mero (disambiguation)
- -mer, the modern English corresponding affix
