= Renewable energy in Nepal =

Renewable energy (RE)
- RE as % of gross energy consumption: unknown%

Renewable electricity
- Domestic electricity supply generated by RE: 95% (2025)
- RE generated / Net electricity generation: 10000 GWh (2025)
- Record % RE covered electricity consumption: unknown%

Installed capacity
- Wind turbines: 1 MW
- Bio energy (2014): approx. 41.5 MW
- Solar power: 317.14 MW
- Hydro power: 3878 MW

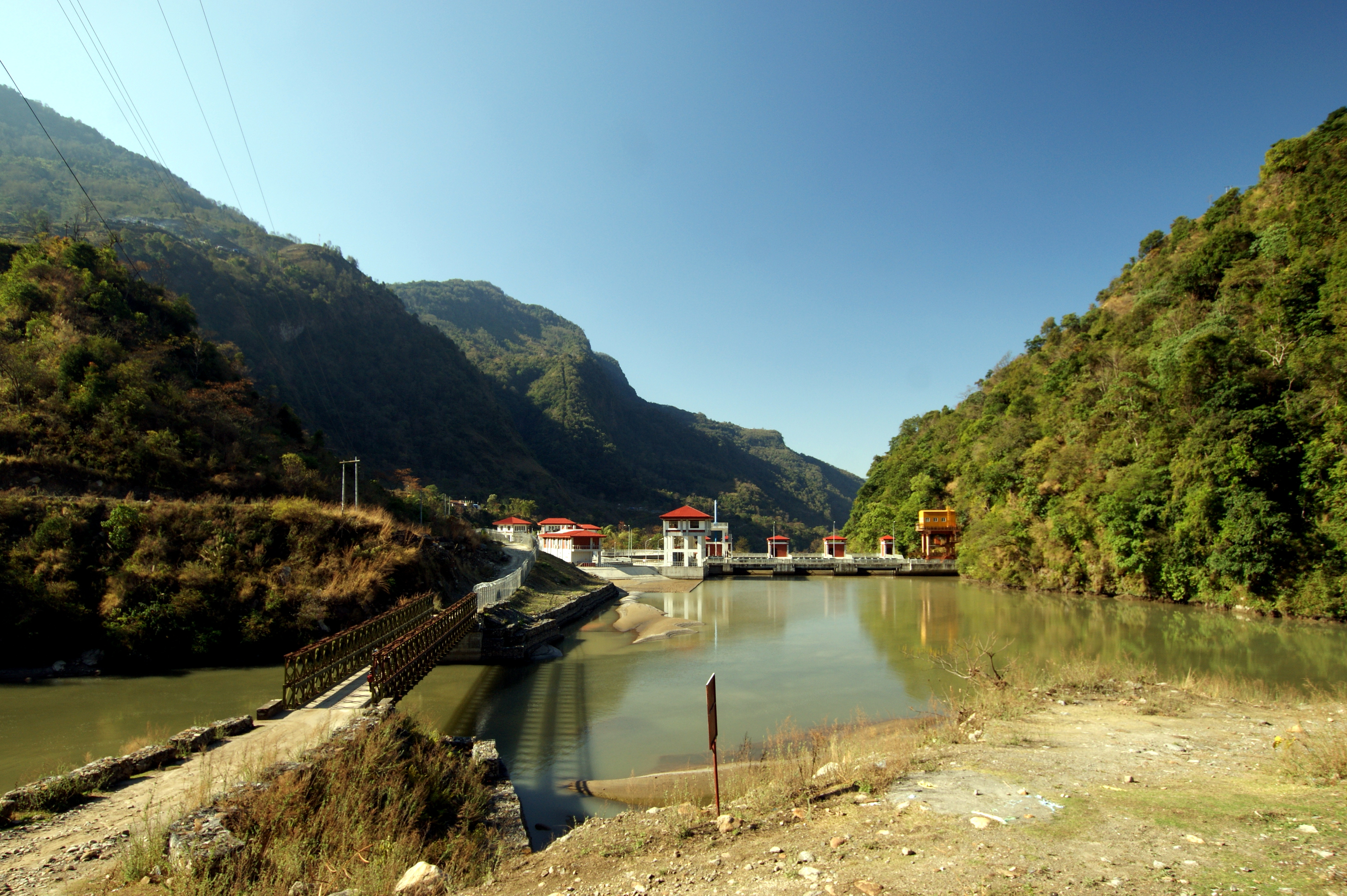
Hydropower plant in Ngadi Bazar, Lamjung District

Renewable energy in Nepal is a sector that is rapidly developing in Nepal. While Nepal mainly relies on burning biomass for its energy needs, solar and wind power is being seen as an important supplement to solve its energy crisis. The most common form of renewable energy in Nepal is hydroelectricity.

Nepal is one of three countries with the greatest increases in electricity access from 2006 to 2016, owing to grid-connected and off-grid renewables.

== Hydropower ==
According to one estimate, Nepal has a hydropower potential of 83,000 megawatts (MW). Harnessing an estimated 40,000 MW is considered technically and economically feasible.

Nepal currently has an installed capacity of 1142 MW coming from 88 hydropower plants across the country. Of this, 441 MW is produced by 60 hydropower plants owned by independent power producers. Most of Nepal's hydropower plants are run-of-the-river, which causes electricity supply to fluctuate according to the season.

As of March 2018, as many as 113 hydropower plants are under construction. These plants will have a combined capacity of 3,090 MW once completed. As of July 2019, over 85% of the population of Nepal has access to electricity.

The Nepal earthquake in April 2015 is estimated to have destroyed at least 14 hydropower dams in the country, accounting for 115 MW of hydropower facilities. The earthquake affected 30 percent of Nepal's generating capacity at the time. This resulted in suggestions for Nepal to diversify it energy mix, as well as for "short, medium and long-term energy planning to have reliable, secure and sustainable electricity provided to households, businesses and industries in the country."

As of July 2025, Nepal's total installed electricity capacity is 3,878 MW. This figure was announced by Nepal's Energy Minister and represents a significant increase from previous reports earlier in the year.

== Solar energy ==
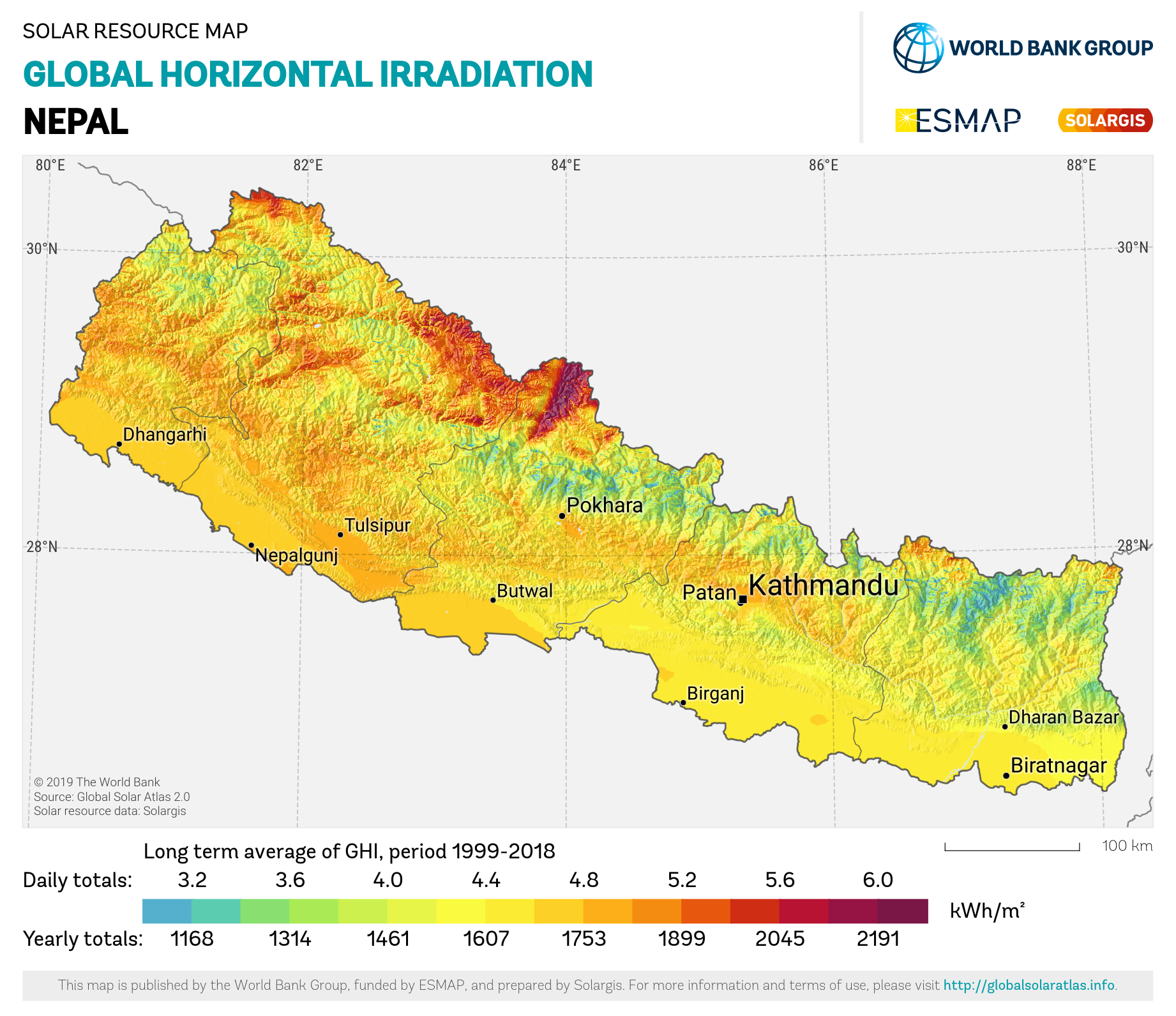
Solar potential of Nepal

Nepal gets most of its electricity from hydropower sources, but it is looking to expand the role of solar power in its energy mix. The average global solar radiation in Nepal varies from 3.6 to 6.2 kWh/m^{2}/day, sun shines for about 300 days a year, the number of sunshine hours amounts almost 2100 hours per year with an average of 6.8 hours of sunshine each day and average insolation intensity about 4.7 kWhm²/day. The commercial potential for a solar power grid is about 2100MW.

Power cuts with an average of 10 hours per day in the past time had been common in Nepal and Nepal Electricity Authority used to publish a time table for power cuts. Solar energy can be seen as a more reliable source of energy in Nepal than the traditional electricity. Private installations of solar panels are more frequent in Nepal.

The People living in places such as Madi, Chitwan, where the Electricity Authority does not provide electricity because of Chitwan National Park, have been relying on solar power for several years.

In 2015, the World Bank agreed to invest 130 million dollars into the development of a 25MW solar power plant. They plan to connect it to the national power grid in the future. Construction of the plant began in April 2018 in the Nuwakot district. The project will serve the Kathmandu Valley upon completion. Upon completion, it will be the largest renewable energy project in the country.

In 2019, Nepal's Department of Electricity Development approved survey licenses for 21 locations to prepare for the possible installation of 56 solar plants, which could have a combined solar capacity of 317.14 MW. The largest planned solar energy project is a 120 MW solar PV station in Dhalkebar in Dhanusha district.

== Wind-solar energy ==
Nepal launched its largest wind-solar power system in December 2017 to serve rural households in the Hariharpurgadi village, Sindhuli district, under the South Asia Subregional Economic Cooperation Power System Expansion Project. The system has the capacity to produce 110 kilowatt-hours of energy per day.

The country also operates a mini-grid wind-solar system in rural village of Dhaubadi the Nawalparasi district, which supplies 43.6 kilowatt-hours of energy per day.

== Electric vehicles ==
Electric powered public three wheeler have been in use to reduce carbon dioxide (CO_{2}) emissions. There are about 600 safe tempos in Kathmandu Valley and more than 50,000 around the country.

76% of new car sales in 2025 were electric.

== See also ==
- Renewable energy in Asia
- Kaligandaki A Hydroelectric Power Station
- Bhote Koshi Project
- Wind power in Nepal
- Solar power in Nepal
