= Energy in Nepal =

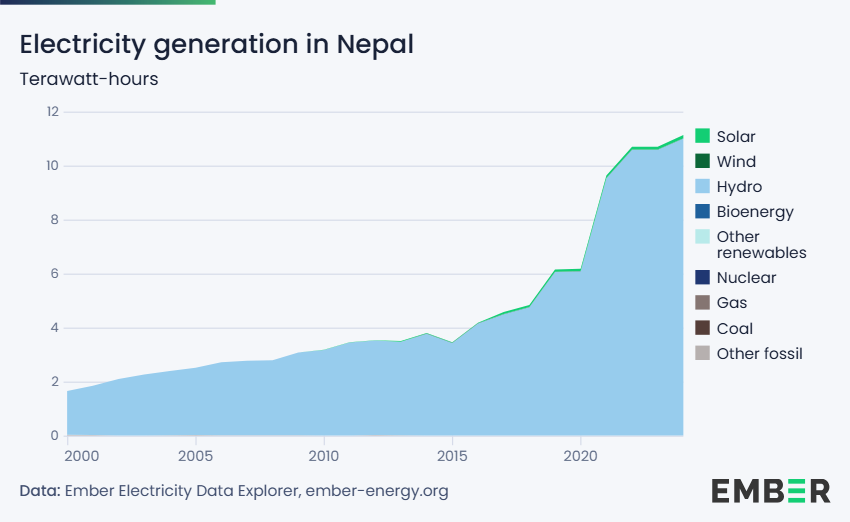
Electricity generation in Nepal in terawatt-hours

Nepal is a country enclosed by land, situated between China and India. It has a total area of 148,006.67 square kilometers and a population of 29.16 million. It has a small economy, with a GDP of $42 billion in 2024, amounting to about 1% of South Asia and 0.04% of the World's GDP.

Nepal's total energy consumption in 2019/2020 was 14.464 million tons of oil equivalent, increased from 10.29 Mtoe in 2012. Electricity consumption was 3.57 TWh. The energy mix is dominated by traditional sources like firewood and agricultural residue (68.7%), most of this primary energy (about 80%) represents solid biofuels used in the residential sector (for heating, cooking etc.). Smaller shares of energy come from commercial sources like petroleum and coal (28.2%) and renewable sources. About 23% of the electricity is imported, with the rest almost completely supplied by hydroelectricity. Nepal also exports hydroelectricity to India in the wet season.

Nepal has no known major oil, gas, or coal reserves, and its position in the Himalayas makes it hard to reach remote communities. Consequently, in the absence of the energy grid reaching remote locations, most Nepali citizens have historically met their energy needs with biomass, human labor, imported kerosene, and/or traditional vertical axis water mills. Energy consumption per capita is thus low, at one-third the average for Asia as a whole and less than one-fifth of the world average.

The country has considerable hydroelectricity potential. The commercially viable potential is estimated at 44 GW from 66 hydropower sites.

In 2010, the electrification rate was only 53% (leaving 12.5 million people without electricity) and 76% depended on wood for cooking. With about 1 toe for every $1,000 of GDP, Nepal has the poorest energy intensity among all south Asian countries. The country has therefore very large energy efficiency potential.

== Oil products ==
Petroleum is the second largest energy fuel in Nepal after firewood and accounts for 11% of primary energy consumption in the country. All petroleum products are imported from India.

At the moment, the import of petroleum products is transacted exclusively between the Nepal Oil Corporation and the Indian Oil Corporation. 75% of the imports are diesel, kerosene and gasoline. Due to the high energy demand in the country, the dependence on petroleum imports is increasing. More than 62% of the petroleum products are used in the transportation sector. Besides that, petroleum products constitute important energy sources for cooking purposes in households.

== Biomass ==
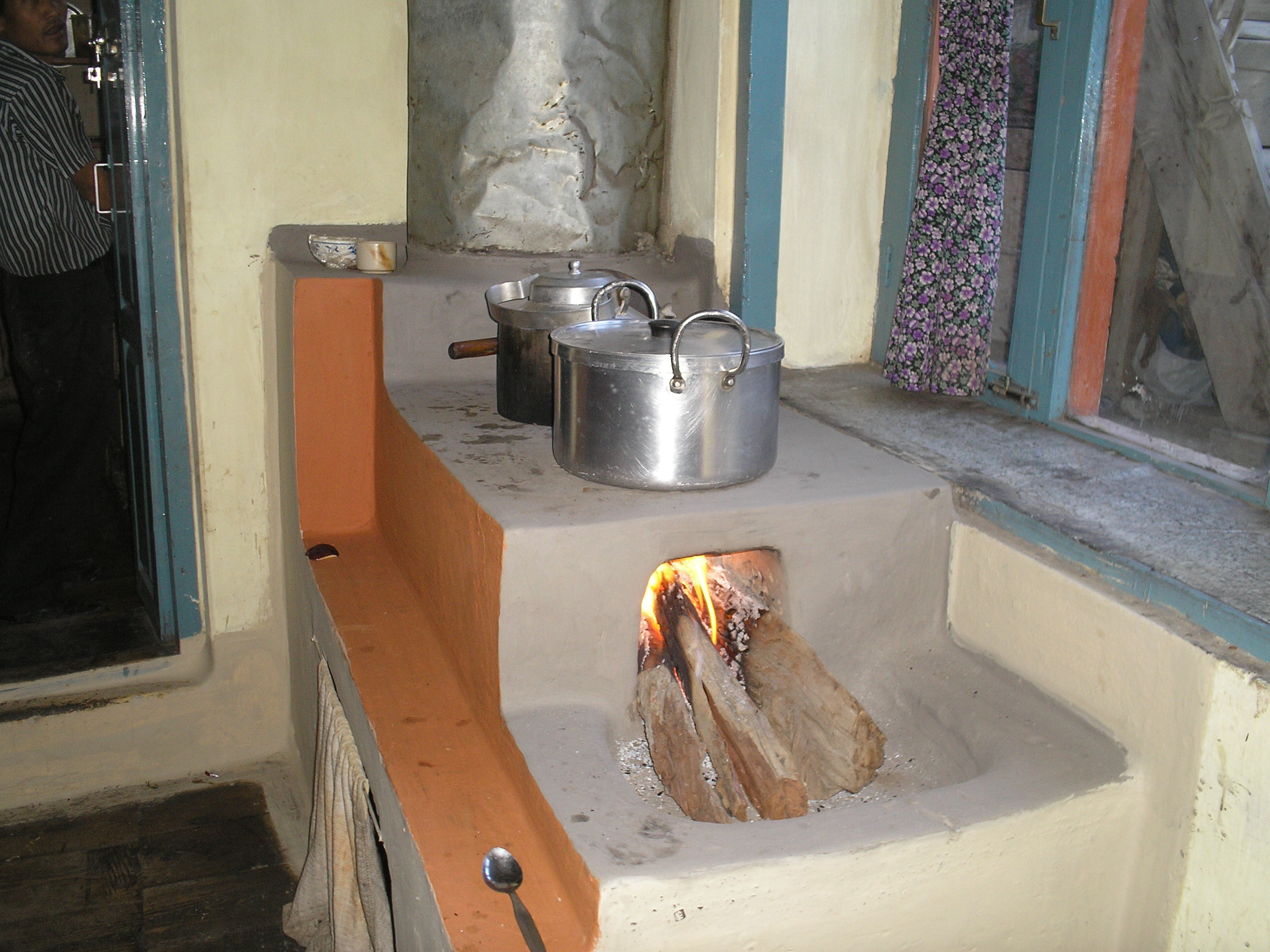
Cooking on a wood-burning stove

Biomass is by far the most important primary energy source in Nepal. Biomass comprises wood, agricultural residues and dung.

One major problem with this is that burning these biomass substances for cooking is a common practice (87.3%) and thus exposes those living in the house to harmful air pollutants. Those who cook and live a substantial amount of time in the household (often women and children) are exposed to these pollutants and incur a high risk of acute respiratory infection. In addition, the burning of these biomass fuels often emits large quantities of greenhouse gases (GHGs) into the outside air. One study in a mountain village of Nepal showed that carbon emissions from traditional cooking methods were around 8 tons per person per year.

== Biogas ==
The farming system in Nepal is heavily dependent on livestock, with at least 1.2 million households owning cattle and buffalo. The biogas potential is therefore high and is estimated to be at least one million household-size plants, 57% located in the Terai plains, 37% in the hills and 6% in remote hills.

According to Nepal's Alternative Energy Promotion Centre, as of July 2011, 241,920 biogas plants were installed in more than 2,800 Village Development Committee areas and in all 75 Districts under their Biogas Support Program.

Biogas uses anaerobic digestion, in which microorganisms break down organic matter into methane and carbon dioxide without oxygen. A positive byproduct of biogas is that excess wastes produced by the system can be used as organic fertilizer. Biogas as an alternative energy source helps reduce dependence on low grade energy sources (biomass) which pose significant health risks and contribute to GHG emissions. The Nepalese have reported barriers to biogas implementation, including the large upfront capital costs, the inability of traditional biogas systems to operate in cold and mountainous climates, and the isolation of villages making installation logistics more difficult.

== Renewable energy ==
Renewable energy in Nepal comes from hydropower, solar energy, biomass, biogas, and wind energy.

=== Solar ===
Nepal has favorable solar resources, receiving daily average solar radiation of 3.6 to 6.2 kW/m^{2}. Sunshine duration is around three hundred days per year or 6.8 hours per day, equivalent to approximately 2100 hours annually. This indicates good potential for solar power generation across most regions in Nepal. Nepal's favorable solar resources have attracted interest in solar technology due to their relatively low upfront costs and fast installation. As a result, some solar applications like household lighting, water pumping, water treatment, domestic space, and water heating have been used in Nepal over the past few decades. Although the solar technology implementation in Nepal has been a small, isolated system, extensive integration is possible into the national grid. It might contribute significantly to fulfilling overall energy demand in Nepal. The Government of Nepal plans to develop a large-scale 250 MW solar project in the Tarai plains, including a 20 MW storage system

=== Hydropower ===
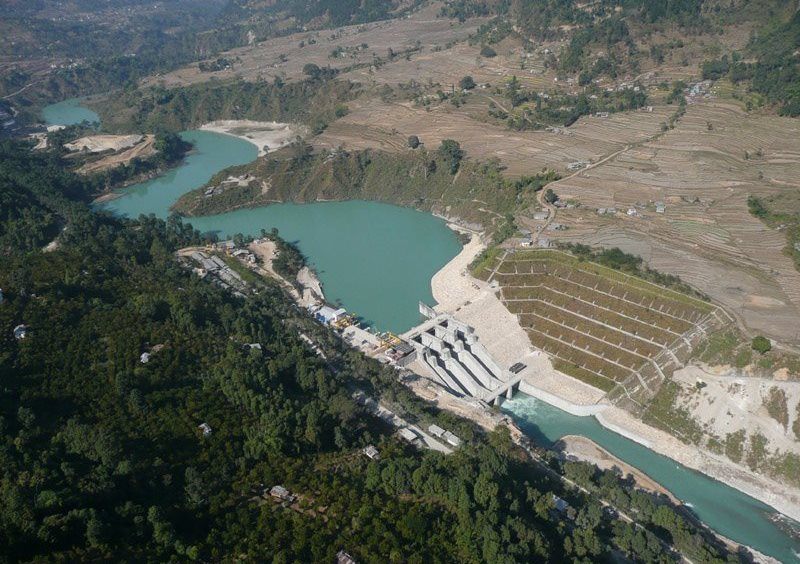
Middle Marshyandi Hydroelectricity Dam, Udipur

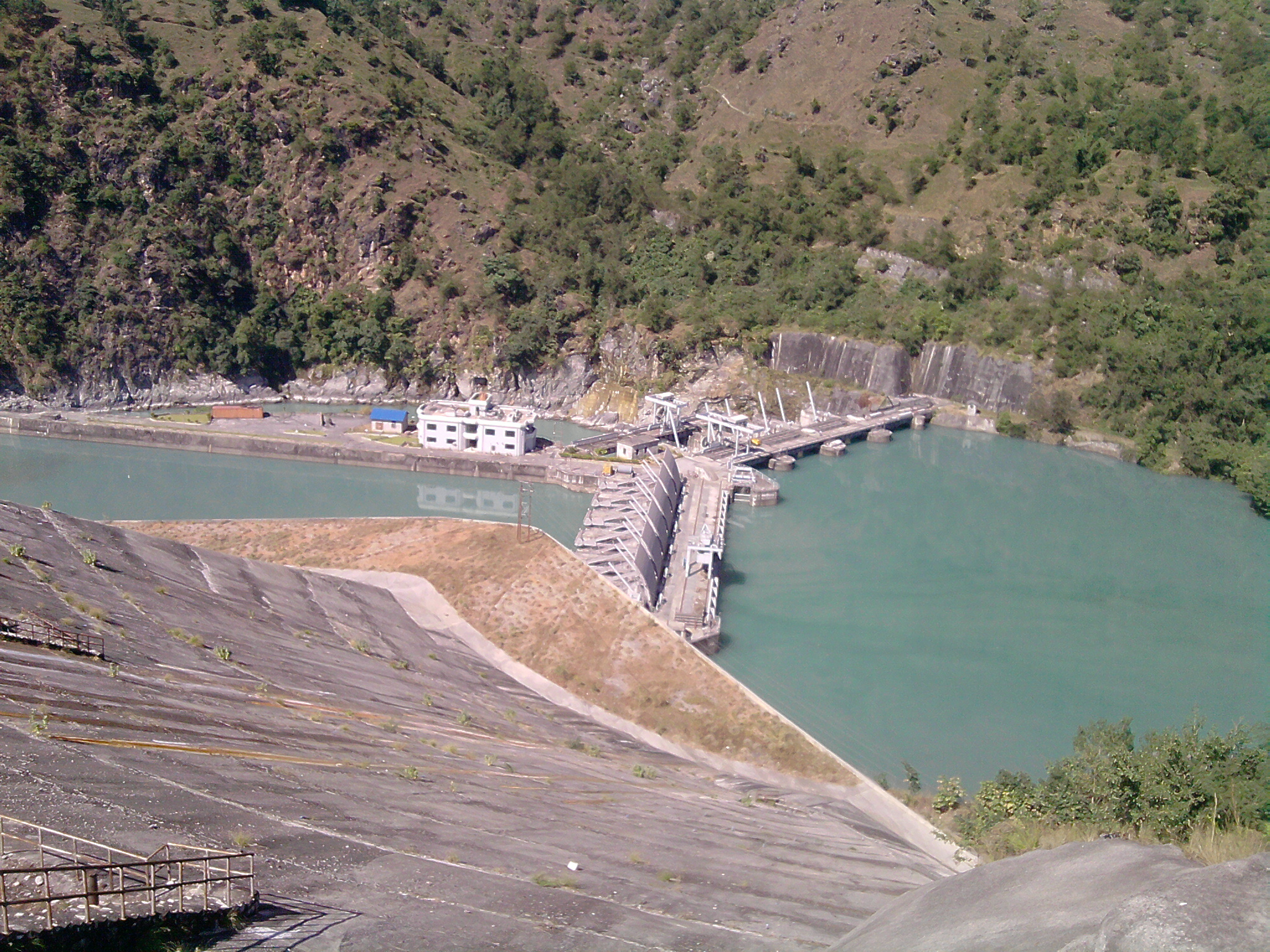
Kaligandaki A Hydroelectric Power Station, Second biggest hydropower project producing 144 MW.

Nepal has a highly mountainous landscape, with elevations rising from 60 meters above sea level to 8848 meters within an average north-south distance of less than 150km. An annual water discharge of 225 billion m³ flows out of the country, supplemented by high hydraulic heads. Nepal is often called the "water tower of South Asia" due to its vast water resources. The country's rugged topography, numerous rivers and streams with 6000 a total length of about 45,000 km, lends itself to hydropower generation. Hydroelectric potential in Nepal is approximately 83000 Megawatts, of which 45,000MW are economically and technically viable.

Around 86% of Nepal's population has access to grid electricity, while 10% depend on off-grid distributed generation, mainly from renewables; between 2018 and May 2022, Nepal doubled its installed capacity from 1,069 MW to 2,100 MW. Continuing capacity expansion can be used to address long-suppressed domestic demand, replace imported fossil fuels, and export to the South Asian region.

The rivers of Nepal can be broadly classified into three types according to their origins:

1. The four central river systems of the country: Koshi, Gandaki, Karnali, and Mahakali. All of them originate from glaciers and snow-fed lakes.
2. Rivers originating from the Mahabharat range, including Babai, West Rapti, Bagmati, Kamala, Kankai, and Mechi.
3. Streams and rivulets originating from the Chure hills; these rivers cause flash floods during monsoon rains but have very little or no flow during the dry season.

At present, about 10% of the total rainfall in Nepal falls as snow. Around 23% of the country's land area is above the enduring snow line at 5000 meters. Glaciers cover about 3.6% of Nepal's total area. Nepal has 3,252 glaciers spanning an area of 5,323 km², with an ice reserve of around 481 km³. The country also has 2,323 glacial lakes encompassing 75 km².

Small-scale hydroelectricity generation in Nepal dates back to the 1960s, when the government promoted subsidies for remote installations. The semi-government Nepal Electricity Authority is responsible for significant hydropower projects. The Alternative Energy Promotion Centre (AEPC) was established as an autonomous institution in 1996 to promote large-scale sustainable renewable energy use under the Ninth National Plan. It has been mandated to advance various renewable energy technologies in Nepal. The AEPC is the government agency responsible for promoting renewable energy technologies. It provides subsidies and technical assistance to community and regional government offices.

The Nepal Micro-Hydro Development Association represents around 60 microhydropower companies in the country. It advocates for these companies and regulates training for plant operators and managers. Locally, district coordination committees represent communities within a district. These committees usually provide financial support to renewable energy projects in their districts.

Around 3300 micro-hydropower plants in Nepal are owned and operated by local communities. Most of these have been funded through AEPC subsidies. These projects are an option for increasing energy access in off-grid areas, especially in remote and rural areas, which supports the sustainable livelihood of people. Micro hydro power benefits rural communities through increased income, reduced fossil fuel reliance, and benefits to health and education. However, some projects face issues like poor maintenance, unequal benefit distribution, and insufficient income – reducing sustainability.

The government of Nepal (GoN) has identified the development of hydropower resources as the path to the country's economic development in the long term. Consequently, GoN has set a target to develop 15 GW in the next ten years and around 40 GW by 2040, which GoN plans to use mainly for domestic load demand and export to neighboring countries. GoN, government-owned entities, Independent Power Producers (IPPs), and internationally funded power producers are actively involved in the hydropower development in Nepal. However, developing a robust and reliable national transmission network is essential to properly transmit, distribute, and export power generated from these hydroelectric plants (NEA/GoN, 2023). At present much attention and investment have been focused mainly on the development of hydroelectricity generation plants. Planned transmission system development has been a less discussed topic, resulting in an ad hoc approach to transmission system development.

The Nepal Electricity Authority(NEA) is Nepal's sole operator and distributor of electricity. In 2022, NEA achieved a total installed capacity of 626.7 megawatts, generating 3,242.5 gigawatt-hours of electricity. There was a significant 14.61% increase in generation compared to the previous year. The peak annual national demand for electricity has reached 1,748 MW. During fiscal year 2078/79, Nepal exported 493.6 GWh of electrical energy. The only operating thermal power plant is the Hetauda diesel plant, with 14.41 MW capacity and generating 32.51 MWh of energy per year. There are currently eight active projects under development totaling 943.1 MW capacity, and 11 planned and proposed projects could add a further 3,450 MW. Independent Power Produces (IPP) also play a significant role. The electrification rate in Nepal has notably improved in recent years, with access rising from 93% in 2020/21 to 94 % in 2021/22. The government aims to achieve 100% electricity access nationwide by 2024.

In the wet season, Nepal exports its surplus hydroelectricity to India through Indian Energy Exchange. As of 8 June 2022, four of Nepal's hydroelectricity projects export a total of 234 MW of electricity to the Indian market.

=== Wind ===
Nepal has substantial wind energy potential, with estimates of over 3000 MW total capacity. Around 448 MW is commercially viable for electricity generation. Nepal's wind energy potential is concentrated in the high mountains and mid-hills regions, with favorable sites over 3,300 meters above sea level. Despite low population density and arduous geographical conditions, Khumbu Region, Kagbeni, Chusang, Thakmarpha, and Khanjiroba are some of the high-potential mountain areas for wind energy.

Despite some small initiatives, Nepal has abundant wind energy resources that are primarily unutilized because of inadequate policies and insufficient Investment in the sector. The two 10 kW wind turbines installed by the Nepal Electricity Authority in Kagbeni, Mustang, in 1989 were destroyed within three months. During 2018, there were only 113.6 kW of total installed wind capacity, 65 kW from AEPC, 3.5 kW from Practical Action, and 45.1 kW from the private sector.

== Coal ==
The coal production in the nation was 7250.1 tons in FY 2076/77 BS. This value increased to 11303.9 tons in FY 2077/78 and dropped in FY 2078/79 to 6927.04 tons. A total of 9 licenses were issued in each fiscal year 2076/77 to 2078/79 for coal production. The leading consumer of coal in Nepal is the brick-manufacturing industry.

== Other ==
In addition to traditional energy sources, Nepal has other potential resources, including municipal solid waste, industrial by-products like bagasse from sugar production, secondary wood sources such as logging residue and sawmill waste, furniture production scraps, and agricultural crop and bush residues. Hydrogen fuel is another potential energy source where research is ongoing.

== See also ==
- Renewable energy in Nepal
- Nepal Electricity Authority
