= Telecommunications in Nepal =

Communications in Nepal

Telephony
- Total telephone subscribers: 139.32 (May 2019)
- Mobile subscribers: 39,988,752 (May 2019)
- Fixed line subscribers: 798,704 (May 2019)
- Monthly telephone additions (Net): (May 2019)
- Teledensity: (May 2019)
- Urban Teledensity: (May 2019)
- Rural Teledensity: (May 2019)
- Active wireless Subscribers: (July 2018)

Internet access
- Internet users: 18,685,873 (Mar 2019)
- Mobile Broadband subscribers: 49.65 (May 2019)
- Internet penetration: 63.31 (Mar 2019)
- Share of World Internet Users: (August 2019)
- country code top-level domain: .np

Broadcasting
- Private television channels: (Mar 2019)
- Private FM radio stations: (Mar 2019)

Nepal's telecommunication network has increased over the years significantly, with the number of telephone users (both fixed and mobile phone) reaching 40,789,198 as of 14 May 2019.

Nepal Telecommunications Authority (NTA) is the regulatory body of telecommunications in the country. According to the latest figures, eight companies have been licensed to operate voice-based telephony services, out of which five are heavily invested by foreign companies. The investment market of telecom is a subject of interest for many foreign companies and NTA itself as it has to prepare the regulations on hand.

According to the latest Management Information system (MIS) report of the Nepal Telecommunications Authority (NTA), 97.65 per cent of 26.49 million people in the country have access to telephone service. The report includes data of up to mid-December 2014. Telephone penetration increased by 12.88 percentage points in one year. It stood at 84.77 per cent in mid-December 2013.

== History ==
=== The beginning ===
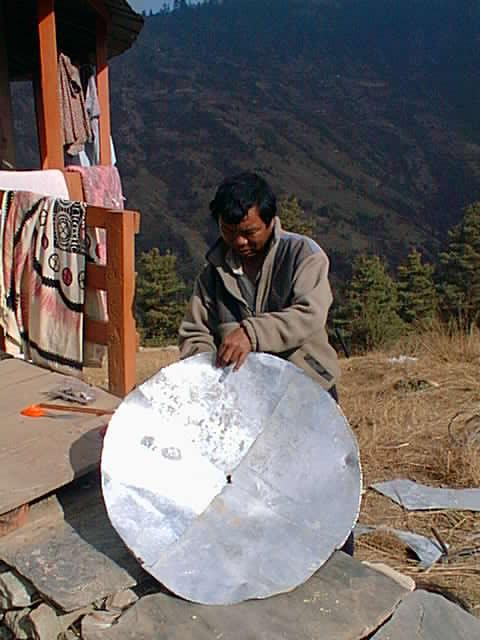
Mahabir Pun hand-making a satellite dish in Nepal

In Nepal, operating any form of telecommunications service dates back to 1970. However, telecom service was formally provided mainly after the establishment of MOHAN AKASHWANI in B.S. 2005. Later as per the plan formulated in the First National Five-year plan (2012-2017 BS), Telecommunication Department was established in B.S. 2016. In order to modernize the telecommunications services and expand the services, during the third five-year plan (2026 BS), Telecommunication Department was converted into Telecommunications Development Board in B.S. 2026.

After enacting the Communications Corporation Act 2028, it was formally established as a fully owned Government Corporation called Nepal Telecommunications Corporation in B.S. 2032 to provide telecommunications services to Nepalese People. After serving the nation for 29 years with great pride and a sense of accomplishment, Nepal Telecommunication Corporation was transformed into Nepal Doorsanchar Company Limited (NDCL) from Baisakh 1, 2061. NDCL is a company registered under the Companies Act 2053 with an 85% government share. However, the company is known to the general public by Nepal Telecom (NT) as a registered trademark.

=== Further developments and milestones ===
Some milestones:

- 2023 CDMA Shutdown in Nepal
- 2022 eSIM launched in Nepal for Ntc and Ncell
- 2022 VoLTE launched in Ncell
- 2021 VoLTE launched in Ntc
- 2020 Ntc 4G coverage] reaches 77 districts
- 2017 TDM phones to IP migration started in Nepal
- 2017 Cellular 4G LTE starts in Nepal
- 2011 Launching of GSM 3G Data Only Service
- 2011 Launching of EasyPhone SIP PPP Service
- 2010 Launching of EasyPhone SIP EasyCall Service
- 2010 Soft Launch of EasyPhone IP Call Service
- 2010 EVDO Service started
- 2009 Postpaid CDMA Mobile Service started
- 2009 SMS Service from GSM to CDMA mobile started
- 2009 IVR 1606 Service extended outside Kathmandu Valley
- 2009 IVR 198 Service extended outside KTM valley
- 2008 PSTN VMS - Notice Board Service Launched
- 2008 IVR 198 service extended for ADSL Fault Complaint Registration
- 2008 IVR Service 1607 started for GSM and CDMA PUK Enquiry
- 2008 Broadband ADSL Service launched
- 2007 GPRS, 3G and CRBT Services introduced in GSM Mobile
- 2007 VOIP Call Complaint Registration started via 188 IVR Service
- 2007 PSTN Bill Enquiry Service started via 1606 IVR Service
- 2007 Expansion of Internet Bandwidth via Optical link between Nepal & India
- 2007 National Roaming for CDMA Mobile (Sky Phone) started
- 2006 CDMA Limited Servies in Kathmandu Valley
- 2006 MCC (198) Complaint Registration via IVR in Kathmandu Valley
- 2006 Home Country Direct Service - NepalDirect (IN)
- 2006 PSTN Credit Limit Service - PCL (IN)
- 2005 Outsourcing of Enquiry Service (197)
- 2005 Access Network Services
- 2005 Soft launch of CDMA
- 2004 Pre-paid Calling Card Service (IN Services)
- 2004 NEPAL TELECOM (Transformation from Corporation to Nepal Doorsanchar Company Limited)2003 GSM Prepaid Service
- 2002 East-West Highway Optical Fiber Project
- 2001 Launching of Payphone Service
- 2000 Launching of Internet Service
- 2000 Implementation of SDH Microwave Radio
- 1999 Launching of GSM Mobile service
- 1998 Direct Link with Bangladesh
- 1998 Nepal Telecommunications Authority established
- 1997 Digital Link with D.O.T. India through Optical Fiber in Birgunj - Raxual
- 1997 First Telecommunication Act passed in Nepal
- 1996 Introduction of VSAT services
- 1996 Independent Int. Gateway Exchange established
- 1996 Automation of the entire Telephone Network
- 1996 Conversion of all Transmission link to Digital transmission link
- 1995 Installation of Optical Fiber Network
- 1994 Mercantile brings Internet in Nepal
- 1987 Commencement of STD service
- 1984 Reliable Rural Telecom Service (JICA)
- 1984 Commencement of STD service
- 1983 Establishment of digital Telephone Exchange
- 1982 Establishment of SPC telex exchange
- 1982 Establishment of Standard "B" Type Earth Station for international circuits
- 1975 Nepal Telecommunication established as Corporation
- 1974 Microwave transmission links establishment for internal trunk
- 1971 Introduction of Telex Services
- 1965 First Automatic exchange in Nepal (1000 lines in Kathmandu)
- 1964 Beginning of International Telecommunications Service using HF Radio to India and Pakistan
- 1962 First Public Telephone Exchange in Kathmandu (300 lines CB)
- 1955 Distribution of telephone line to the general public
- 1951 Installation of Open Wire Trunk line from Kathmandu to Palpa
- 1950 Establishment of CB telephone exchange (100 lines) in Kathmandu
- 1950 Introduction to High-frequency Radio System (AM)
- 1950 Establishment of Telegram Service
- 1948 Establishment of Mohan Akashwani
- 1936 Installation of Open Wire Trunk line from Kathmandu to Dhankuta
- 1935 Installation of 25 lines automatic exchange in Royal Palace
- 1914 Establishment of Open wire Trunk Link from Kathmandu to Raxaul (India)
- 1913 Establishment of first telephone lines in Kathmandu

The first telephone exchange was established in Kathmandu in 1960. From 1960 to 2004, the state-owned Nepal Telecommunications Corporation (NTC), also known as Nepal Telecom, or Nepal Doorsanchar Company Limited (NDCL), had been the monopoly telecom carrier. Now, there are only two operators, so Nepal's telecom industry is a duopoly market. Other competing telecom service providers like United Telecom (UTL), Smart Telecom are no more in the picture in Nepal.

== Telephony ==
The country code for Nepal is 00977. As of May 2013, there are 644,347 wireline customers.

=== Telephone system ===
- Domestic: Microwave and optical fiber
- International: Radio telephone communications; microwave landline to India; two satellite earth stations by Intelsat (Indian Ocean)

=== Mobile telephony ===
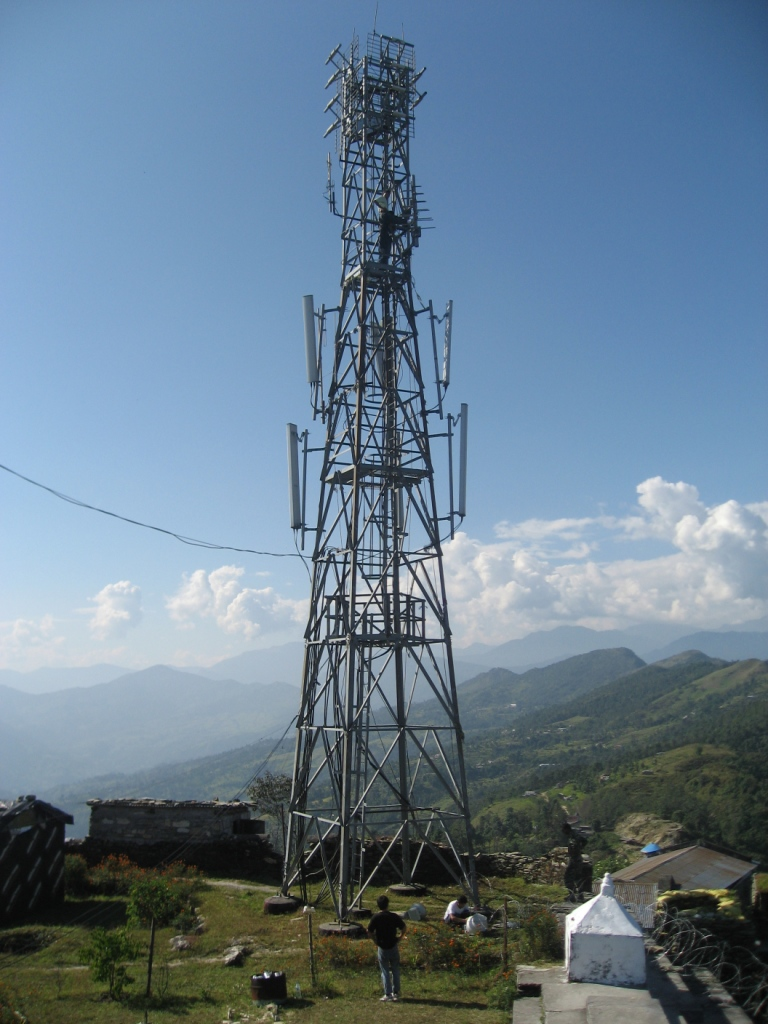
A telecommunication tower in Pokhara

As of 2019, there are four operational three major telecom operators in Nepal:

- Nepal Telecom formerly known as Nepal Telecommunications Corporation (NTC)
- Ncell
- SmartCell

CG Telecom was set to launch its services in 2019.

As of May 2013, there were 18,137,771 mobile subscribers.

==== 5G connectivity ====
In 2019, Nepal Telecom has announced its intention to launch 5G services in the next few years after the deployment of 4G nationwide.

== Internet ==
As of May 2013, there are 127 ISPs and 6.7 million internet users in Nepal.

== Television broadcasting ==
Television broadcast stations: 19 (37 registered) (2012)

Televisions: 130,000 (1997)

== Radio ==
Radio broadcast stations:' AM 6, FM 20, shortwave 1 (January 2000) Radios: 20,00,000 (2006)

== See also ==
- Mass media in Nepal
- Nepal Telecommunications Authority
- List of Telecom Companies in Nepal
- List of countries by smartphone penetration
- List of countries by Internet connection speeds
