= Association of Youth Organizations Nepal =

Non-governmental autonomous network

Association of Youth Organizations Nepal (AYON)
- Type: Public
- Genre: Youth Network Organisation
- Founder: R.Mulmi, P. Bhattarai, S. Dahal, K. Burklakoti & S. Joyti (2005)
- Headquarters: Kathmandu, Nepal, Kathmandu
- Area served: Nepal
- Number of employees: 8 (2010)
- Website: www.ayon.org.np

The Association of Youth Organizations Nepal (AYON) is a non-political, non-religious, non-governmental, not-for-profit, autonomous network of Youth Organizations and as such, a platform for collaboration, cooperation, joint action and collective endeavor between Youth Organizations in Nepal. So far, 92 youth organizations have registered with AYON. The organisation is situated in New Baneshwor, Kathmandu.

AYON took lead during the Nepali earthquake and mobilized thousands of youth volunteers. Immediately after the disastrous earthquake, within just 23 hours Association of Youth Organizations Nepal (AYON) in coordination with various youth groups like Come on Youth Stand Up initiated #act4quake youth group within to respond to the earthquake disaster.

(AYON), together with other local, national, and international agencies, has been involved in relief works from immediately after the earthquake mobilizing more than 900 youth volunteers in 14 districts. The youth volunteers team meets the people, make the community, does the medical emergency medical treatments, cleans the area to stop the epidemics and in some locations like Sankhu, Nuwakot building temporary bamboo houses.

To date {16 May 2015} it has reached more than 140 villages of 14 districts and its teams including medical persons are reaching to un-reached and un-served areas with relief materials.

== Member organisations ==
In 2015, AYON works with 987 member organisations, situated in Nepal:

Name of Organization	District	Zone
Bal Samaj Nepal	Morang	Koshi
Mugu	Karnali	Karnali
Center for Research and Development (CRD, Nepal)	Kavre	Bagmati
Child Protection Nepal	Bara	Narayani
Community Development Forum	Dang	Rapti
Community Development Forum Nepal (CDF Nepal –Doti)	Doti	Seti
Creative Good Governance Club(CGGC)	Surkhet	Bheri
Creative Youth Society (CYS)	Lalitpur	Bagmati
Development Concern Society (DECOS)	Rolpa	Rolpa
Friendship Youth Society	Kathmandu	Bagmati
Gaja Yuwa Club	Baglung	Dhaulagiri
GRID Nepal (Group for Rural Infrastructure Development Nepal)	Lalitpur	Bagmati
Hanuman Youth Club	Dhanusha	Janar
Himalayan River guide Association Nepal (HRGAN) Kathmandu	Kathmandu	Bagmati
HRELIC Nepal (National committee of Human Rights Education Club)	Kathmandu	Bagmati
Human Rights and Good Governance Club	Sindhuli	Janakpur
HYSEF (Himalayan Youth & Student Forum)	Kathmandu	Bagmati
Imagine Street Nepal Youth Forum	Kathmandu	Bagmati
Jagriti Child and Youth Concern Nepal	Nawalparasi	Nawalparasi
Karnali Source and management and Rural Empowerment Center, SEC – MARK Mugu	Mugu	Karnali
Nawa Jagaran Yuwa Club	Baglung	Dhaulagiri
"Nawa Malika Youth Club, Baglung (NMYC Baglung) "	Baglung	Dhaulagiri
Nepal Basketball Academy (NBA)	Kathmandu	Bagmati
"Nepal Environment & Education Development Society, (NEEDS) "	Kanchanpur	Mahakali
Nepal Youth Forum(NYF)	Lalitpur	Bagmati
Nodan Club	Kathmandu	Bagmati
NYEF (Nepalese Young Entrepreneurs Forum)	Kathmandu	Bagmati
Prosperous Nepal Youth Society (PNYS)	Kathmandu	Bagmati
Shree Krishna Gandaki Youth Club(SKGYC)	Palpa	Gandaki
Social Development Service Center (SDSC)	Dhanusa	Janakpur
Society for Humanism Youth (SOCH Youth)	Kathmandu	Bagmati
Suryodaya Yuwa Club	Kaski	Gandaki
Tourism Development Endeavors (TUDE)	Kathmandu	Bagmati
UNITED YOUTH(UNITED YOUTH for World Peace)	Kathmandu	Bagmati
Women Upliftment and awareness center, Mugu(WUAC)	Mugu	Karnali
YATRA	Lalitpur	Bagmati
YES Nepal (Youth Engagement in Sustainability)	Kathmandu	Bagmati
Youth Action Nepal	Kathmandu	Bagmati
Youth For Change Nepal	Kaski	Gandaki
Youth Initiative	Kathmandu	Bagmati
Youth Solidarity-Nepal	Doti	Seti
Youth Network For peace	Achham	Seti
Social Development and promotion Center	Surkhet	Bheri
Jana kalyan Club	Sindhupalchok	Bagmati
Youth for Development	Kailali	Seti
Good Governance Protection forum	Hekuli	Dang
Communication Development Forum	Kapan	Kathmandu
Nepal Association of the Partially Sighted	Kathmandu	Bagmati
Youth Civil Society	Kathmandu	Bagmati
Community Development Campaign	Lalitpur	Bagmati
Youth Federation for human Rights, peace and development	Bara	Bara
Children's Partners Nepal	Kathmandu	Bagmati
Youth Network Doti	Dipayal	Doti
Pravasi Nepali Coordination Committee	Kathmandu	Bagmati
Nepal Social Development Awareness center	Siraha	Siraha
Suryoday Youth Club	Birgunj	Parsa
Bataworan Chetansil Samaj	Illam	Illam
Ideal Youth Group	Jhapa	Jhapa
Farwest Multi Purpose (FWMC)center	Dhangadi	kailali
Unification Nepal (UN-Nepal)	Gorkha	Gorkha
Youth Partnership for Development and Peace Nepal	Manthali	Ramechhap
Helping Hands for Sustainability	Kathmandu	Bagmati
VOY CAUCAS	Kathmandu	Bagmati
Deurali Youba Club (DYC)	Dhankuta	Dhankuta
Chandra Jyoti Integratated Rural Development Society (CIRDS)	Dhading	Dhading
PEACE Nepal	Palpa	Lumbini
Srijanshil Yuwa Akata Club	Banke	Bheri
Youth for Sindhuli (YFS)	Kamalmai	Sindhuli
People's Inspiration Center (PIC)	Dhanusha	Janakpur
Participatory Rural Development Programme (PRDP)	Charikot	Dolakha
All people's Development Center (APEC)	Lahan	Siraha
Social Improve Service Forum (SISEF, Nepal)	Parbat	Kusma
Shree Krishna Yuwa Club (SKYCS)	Mahottari	Janakpur

== Definitions ==
These definitions are according to AYON. Youth: Youth is an individual, male or female, of any class, caste, creed, origin or religion, who is of the age group between 16 years to 35 years. To compare the Youth definition of the United Nation is between 15 and 24 years old.

Youth Organization: Youth Organization is an organization run by youth, conducting activities directly targeting youth, for the development of youth. These organizations should have at least 75% youths in its membership base and the executive committee.

== Objectives ==
- To act as an umbrella organization for Youth Organizations in Nepal to foster cooperation, dialogue, network and collaboration for youth empowerment and development
- To advocate, lobby and facilitate mainstreaming of youth issues in the National agenda.
- To organize capacity building programs, trainings and workshops to strengthen the network and its member organizations.
- To serve as consulting and advisory body to the government agencies and relevant stakeholders regarding youth issues in Nepal.
- To organize various youth events having national and international significance.

.

- To represent Nepalese youth in international policy/decision making bodies, associations, conferences, and various fora.
- To build network and alliance with international youth organizations and networks to foster youth development.
