= Ankuri Mahadev =

Ankuri Mahadev अंकुरी महादेव मन्दिर

Religion
- Affiliation: Hinduism

Location
- Location: Mahadeva
- Country: Nepal

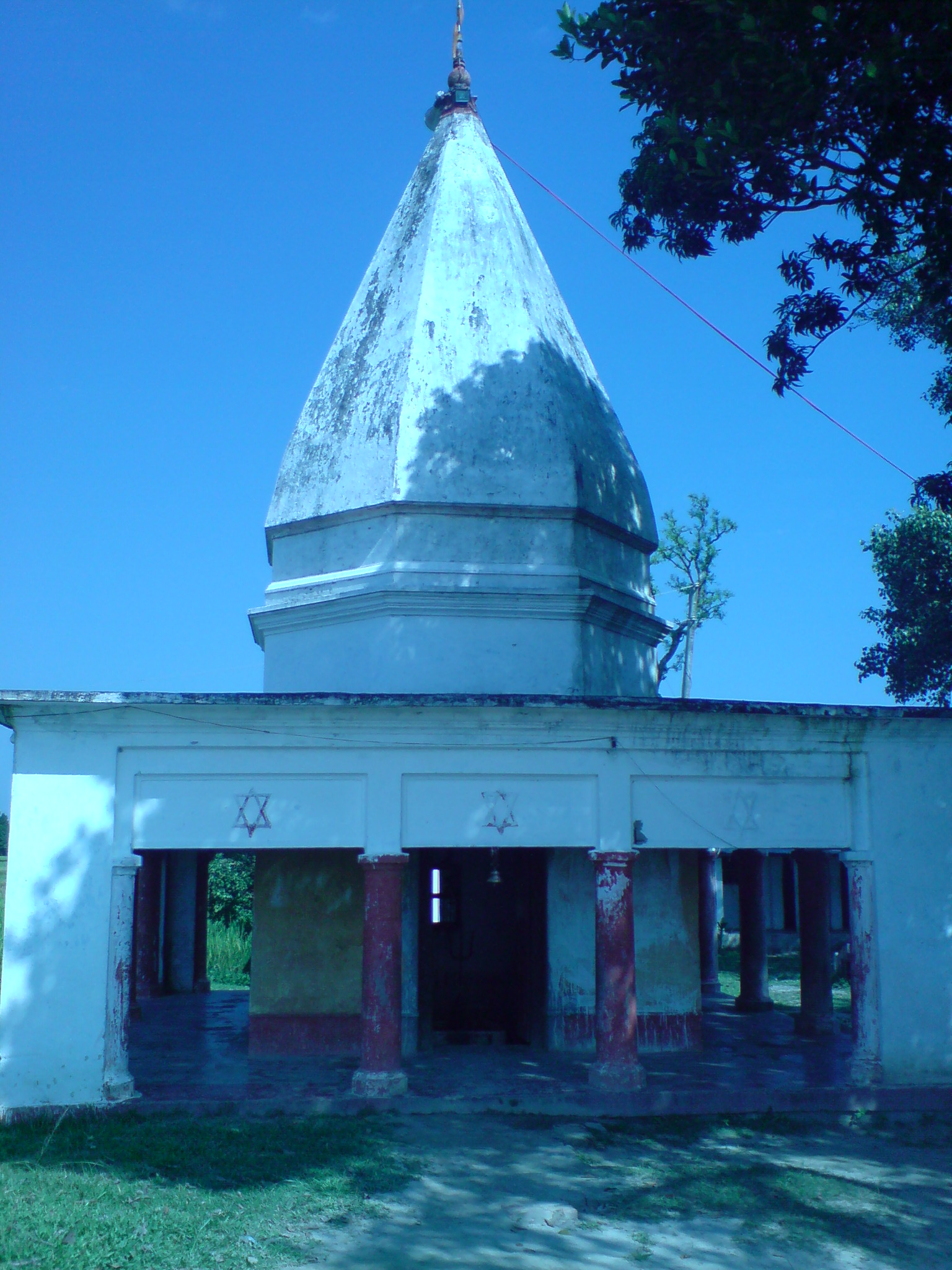
Ankuri Mahadev Temple at Mahadeva, Saptari, Nepal.

Ankuri Mahadev is a Hindu temple located in Mahadeva in the Saptari District of Nepal. The main temple contains a Shiva Linga, along with statues of Goddess Parvati and God Hanuman in other temples. The Shiva Linga has a fist-sized dent on the top. It is said that this place was a crematorium long ago and was isolated. Some cowherds from nearby villages used to go there. They attempted to bring Shiva Linga to their homes several times, but it would mysteriously return to its original place. It is also said that whoever tried to take the Shiva Linga home would suffer misfortune, with a family member becoming ill or even dying. Later, the master of the cowherds heard about this and built a temple for the Shiva Linga on the same spot.

It is a well-known pilgrimage site for Lord Shiva devotees, and every year, large fairs are held during festivals like Shivaratri and Anant Chaturdashi. It is also a holy place to perform sacred yajnas.

== Name ==
The temple is also known as Chandreshwarnath Mahadev. The name "Ankuri" (sprouted) comes from the belief that the Shiva Linga appeared on its own. It was not brought from elsewhere but found beneath the soil at this spot. According to a supplement of Muktinath Mandal's Saptari Darpan, the village of Mahadeva got its name after the linga emerged from the ground, and the rural municipality is named after the temple. A local devotee, Chandra Das, reportedly dreamed of a buried linga in his village while on pilgrimage to Kamakhya in Assam. On his return, villagers dug at the place he described and found it.
