= Nepalese non-government organisations in Hong Kong =

Nepalese non-government organisations in Hong Kong consist of all the community-based non-government organisations (NGOs) set up to assist the Nepalese ethnic minority communities living in Hong Kong. The NGOs work with the communities to meet various needs: social care, education, sports, music, and so on. These NGOs were established or founded by various ethnic groups ranging from Chinese to Nepalese themselves. Some of them have their own communicating channels within the community or even to their fellow countrymen outside. Most NGOs are periodically active. A few NGO groups operate continuously and are active in different levels.

NGOs serving Nepalese in Hong Kong can be mainly categorised into two types: either founded by Hong Kong Nepalese or Hong Kong Chinese. Some NGOs, of which organisers are hardly traceable, are categorised as “others”.

There are many different types of non-governmental organizations set up by Nepalese community members in Hong Kong. Organizations are set based on Nepal's regions such as Dharan Forum (by people coming from Dharan city), Lumbini Forum (by people coming from the Lumbini region) or districts (such as Ilam Society set up by people coming), political groups (such Far East Overseas Nepalese Association set up by members of Nepal's largest political party Communist Party UML), ethnic groups (such as Gurung Association, Magar Association, Kirant Rai Association, Kiran Yakthung Chumlum, Tamang Association, Chhetri Society, Thakalai Association etc.) To unite all these different societies, Hong Kong Nepalese Federation (https://www.facebook.com/hknepali.mahasangh) was set up in 1998 and has been active to integrate the Nepalese community members into Hong Kong society. The Home Affairs Department of Hong Kong has funded Hong Kong Nepalese Federation to run Nepalese Community Support Team (https://www.facebook.com/cstn.cstn.3 ) under which various training programmes and language programmes are organized. The NGOs organised largely by Chinese serve various ethnic minorities including Nepalese, such as Southern Democratic Alliance, Christian Action (Integrated Service Centre for Ethnic Minorities) and the Hong Kong Christian Service. Southern Democratic Alliance aims at uniting South Asians and Hong Kong people together. It demands stronger anti-discrimination laws and tries to satisfy the desires of South Asians, especially Nepalese. Christian Actions has been serving the ethnic minorities since 2003, especially those in Yau Tsim Mong and Kwun Tong.

Apart from the above, some NGOs categorized as “others” are difficult to trace but fragmented records can be found in different documents or media. It is arduous to reach their chairmen or members to prove their visibility. Hong Kong Tamang Ghedung ( Association ), Lamjung Sewa Samiti, Hong Kong, Miteri Service Committee, Hong Kong and Hong Kong Terhathum Forum are some examples.

== Contribution and works of Nepalese NGOs in Hong Kong ==
=== Voicing out for Nepalese in public ===
Nepalese NGOs voice out for Hong Kong Nepalese in public through organising protests and commenting on social issues respectively. There was a protest organised by Hong Kong Nepalese Federation in light of a Hong Kong policeman's fatal shooting of Bahadur Limbu on March 17, 2009. The protestors demanded an apology and a fair investigation about Limbu's death. They urged to suspend the current Constable, Ka-Ki Hui from force-involving duties during the course of investigation. They also demanded an English inquest for the case.

The NGOs also make commentaries on social issues through the media and in some meetings of the Legislative Council of Hong Kong. For example, the president of Hong Kong Nepalese Security Guard, Palungwa Dil Bahadur stated that the minimum wage should be more than $35 when being interviewed. The Far East Overseas Nepalese Association (Hong Kong) commented on the consultation document of Race Discrimination Ordinance.

=== Community services ===
Nepalese NGOs provide six types of community services basically. First is Hong Kong Nepalese Federation conducting Chinese classes, dance training and sports training regularly.

The Nepalese NGOs organise lots of festivals to celebrate their national culture and religions as well. Dashain and Tihar (incorporating Deepawali Festival) are celebrated by the Far East Dharan Hong Kong Forum, Urlabari Pariwar Hong Kong and the Magar Association Hong Kong. Teej Festival is celebrated by the HINS and Baglung Society Hong Kong. Besides Newar Samaj, Hong Kong celebrates Newar New Year and Mha Puja every year.

There are annual activities to promote their culture, such as the NRN Day organised by the Non-Resident Nepali Association Hong Kong (NRNA HK). Actually the NRN Day is also organised around the world every year by different branches of the NRNA. The Hong Kong Nepali Kala Mandir organises the Nepali Cultural Week every year, usually with Nepalese parades, dances and singing.

There are some online platforms like HKNepal.com, Alopalo.com, HongKongNepali.com, jpthk.com and khursani.com, which let Nepalese exchange the information and opinions. They sponsor and report events as well. Moreover, HINS held a discussion forum on anti-legislation drafting consultation. The language used was Nepalese with little English.

Some Nepalese NGOs help directing Nepalese to the government like the Nepalese Community Support Team, locating in Jordan. It aims at providing information about various governmental services and assisting elderly, the disabled and single parents to approach relevant services.

=== Leisure ===
Mainly four kinds of sport associations are founded by Nepalese in Hong Kong to cater Nepalese needs: football, tennis, taekwondo and bodybuilding.

For football, Hong Kong Integrated Nepalese Society Limited (HINS) aims at promoting football within the Nepalese communities in Hong Kong, especially among the youth. Deurali Football Club is one of the football clubs under HINS. It encourages Nepalese youth to play football and makes a pure Nepalese Football Team participate in the Hong Kong League. For tennis, Hong Kong Nepalese Tennis Society is founded to gather Nepalese tennis fans in Hong Kong and organises tennis competitions. Furthermore, Hong Kong Nepalese Taekwondo Association aims at fostering friendship between Taekwondo players of various races and holds up-grading tests for members. Lastly, the Hong Kong Nepal Bodybuilding Association is active in holding conventions, press conferences and Mr. Nepal - Hong Kong China Bodybuilding Championships.

Moreover, there is a music organisation, Hong Kong Nepalese Rock Forum, which enables its members to share musical information and promotes young Nepalese music talents.

=== Religion ===
Punarjiwan Society was established by Volunteer Recovering Nepali Ex-addicts to help Nepali recovery addicts in yau Ma tei. Religious needs of Hong Kong Nepalese are also met by the Nepalese NGOs. For Christianity, there are seven Nepalese Christian Churches: the United Nepali Christian Church (UNCC), Hosanna Nepali Church and the Nepali Union Church. UNCC holds masses twice a week while the other two are on every Sunday. They aim at promoting Christian teachings among Hong Kong Nepalese.

For Hinduism, Sathya Sai Baba Center of Hong Kong is a recognized Hong Kong Nepalese charity. It has six bhajan groups and publishes Sai Quarterly newsletter and Sai Sarathi. They conduct value-based education through different kind of activities.

Apart from Christianity and Hinduism, Heavenly Path Hong Kong registered in 2006 promotes thoughts of the Supreme Master Almighty Godangel.

=== Support for business of Nepalese in Hong Kong and investments in Nepal ===
Nepalese NGOs also support the business of Hong Kong Nepalese and their investments in Nepal. Nepal Chamber of Commerce Hong Kong (HCCHK) provides an updating database listing information of potential buyers and sellers. It also updates with business leads and attracts frequent users from different countries. Business news, economic analysis and Hong Kong Government tenders, members and company profiles are provided as well. Furthermore, it is a representative to discuss business matters with the government. Apart from helping local Nepalese business, HCCHK and Non-Resident Nepali Association Hong Kong facilitate foreign investments in Nepal.

== Visibility in Hong Kong ==
=== Opinions from people other than Hong Kong Nepalese ===
==== Government ====
Nepalese did appear in the documents of government. Hong Kong Nepalese Federation and HINS signed the Briefing on Hong Kong's Race Discrimination Bill (RDB) prepared for the United Nations Committee on the Elimination of all Forms of racial discrimination in 2008. RDB was passed and has been operating since 2009. Besides, Nepalese is put under the category named “ethnic minority population” in the population census of 2001 and 2006 by the Census and Statistics Department.

==== Media ====
Nepalese NGOs seldom appear in media platform in Hong Kong. There was a protest with more than 2000 Hong Kong ethnic minority participants, mostly Nepalese, after Limbu was shot dead by a policeman in 2009. Reports were made on all major press like the TVB, Apple Daily, Oriental Daily and the South China Morning Post. This was the only major incident involving Nepalese reported by the mainstream media.

The Nepalese also sometimes appear on some alternative media platforms. Hong Kong In-media always speaks up for the ethnic minorities in Hong Kong. Since 2003, the RTHK has been running the AM864, which lasts for 30 minutes, to cater Nepalese audiences’ needs. Also, there was an episode of a TV programme, Hong Kong Story, by RTHK in 2009. It praised Nepalese contributions to Hong Kong as vanguards of British troops during World War I, II and as helpers for Hong Kong Police during the British colonial period. However, the Nepalese have had a negative image in the Chinese mainstream media, which tend to stereotype the Nepalese in Hong Kong as illegal immigrants or lazy vagrants. For the reports about Limbu being shot dead, only in the reports of Mingpao and Economic Daily was Limbu portrayed as harmless instead of being a villain.

=== Descriptions by Hong Kong Nepalese themselves ===
Some Nepalese organisations representatives explain their invisibility with the following reasons. During Nepalese Cultural Week, Rai Kamala, the principal of Sagarmatha commented that Nepalese culture and religion could live in communion with Hong Kong people. However, the language is the barrier. Also he hoped that the government would pay attention to their education problem. Besides, Mr. Kisan Rai, reported by the Everest Weekly, stressed their identity as Hong Kong people and the peaceful manner of their protest during the protest .
