= Nepalese Journal of Ophthalmology =

- Discipline: Ophthalmology.
- Language: English

Publication details
- History: 2009–present
- Frequency: Biannually

Standard abbreviations
- ISO 4: Nepal. J. Ophthalmol.

Indexing
- ISSN: 2072-6805

Links
- Journal homepage

The Nepalese Journal of Ophthalmology is a biannual peer-reviewed medical journal on ophthalmology. It was established in 2009 and is the official journal of the Nepal Ophthalmic Society. It is abstracted and indexed in Index Medicus/MEDLINE/PubMed. It publishes original articles, case reports, review articles, and letters to the editor. The editor-in-chief is Eli Pradhan (Tilganga Institute of Ophthalmology, Kathmandu, Nepal).
