= International rankings of Nepal =

These are the international rankings of Nepal in various fields.

== Education ==
- Literacy rate 76.21% overall

== Economy ==
- 2016 Index of Economic Freedom ranked 152 out of 178
- Ease of Doing Business Index 2020 ranked 94 out of 190
- Global Competitiveness Index 2016-2017 ranked 98 out of 138
- IMF Nominal GDP per capita 2019, ranked 158 out of 187 economies

== Politics ==
- Fragile States Index 2020, ranked 49th most fragile state
- Corruption Perceptions Index 2019, ranked 113th most corrupt out of 176 governments, 110th out of 180 countries in 2022
- Press Freedom Index 2017, ranked 100 out of 180 countries
- Freedom of the Press 2017, ranked 108 out of 198
- Democracy Index 2016, ranked 102 out of 167 governments

== Tourism ==
- World Tourism Organization: World Tourism rankings
- World Economic Forum: Travel and Tourism Competitiveness Report

== Technology ==
- World Intellectual Property Organization: Global Innovation Index 2026, ranked 104 out of 139 countries
