= Nepalese cocoyam =

South Asian root crop

Cocoyam is a tuberous root crop cultivated in many regions of South Asia. Cocoyams share many of the same nutritional and agricultural characteristics as potatoes and other root crops such as cassava and yams.

== Industry status and opportunity ==
In 2013 root and tuber crops made up 21% of all cash crop production in Nepal. Great potential lies in the expansion and commercialization of the cocoyam industry, enabling this subsistence and cash crop to become a source of economic stability for many hillside farmers. Cocoyams have a tuberous root (corm), which is surrounded by potato-size tubers referred to as cormels. The cormels are consumed as food and the leaves and shoots eaten as a nutritious vegetable in many stews and ethnic dishes, while the corms are used for replanting and animal feed. Due to the crop’s versatility, investing in the production of cocoyams would not only provide Nepalese farmers with a source of income from selling the cormels for cocoyam chip production, but would provide sustenance for themselves as well as feed for their livestock. Cocoyams are capable of yielding 30 to 60 tonnes of cormels per hectare, while cassava yields 20 to 40 tonnes per hectare. The high levels of productivity of cocoyams show the potential of sustaining mass production of the crop. With the breeding and selection of high yields as well as the development of agro practices and technology to allow mass production, cocoyam agronomy has the potential of increasing even further.

== Sustainability analysis ==
=== Culture ===
In rural Nepal, women are responsible for up to 80% of agricultural production. Cocoyams are largely produced by female subsistence farmers, thus the crop is commonly associated with low socio-economic status. As cocoyam production is generally an informal activity driven by women on small scale farms, the commercialization and investment in this crop would significantly impact the most vulnerable groups in Nepal. According to a 2005 study carried out by the FAO, women in the high mountainous regions of Nepal contribute more in agricultural production than their male counterpart. In order to benefit female hillside farmers, the commercialization of cocoyam would require an increase in women’s access to development opportunities in order to maintain their control over farms. In the high hills and mountainous regions of Nepal the cultivation of land and transport of crops is carried out by livestock such as oxen. This practice is associated with the cultural practices of the Tibetans that reside in these regions. By promoting the mass production of cocoyam for export, new technologies of agricultural cultivation would be required, eliminating the traditional use of livestock for farming and undermining indigenous practices.

=== Economics ===
In 1990 the price per tonne of cocoyam was shown to be 75.7% higher than cassava and 38.2% higher than sweet potato. For a Nepalese hillside farmer, selling surplus cocoyam to locals presents challenges due to the crop’s higher selling point. However, if cocoyam was to be commercialized and exported overseas, the higher value of the crop would instead benefit Nepalese farmers as they would experience higher revenues than the previous mentioned root crops. Due to current land ownership and tenancy rights in Nepal, land rents require 50% of all agro production to be given to the landowner. According to Hindu law, male offspring come into ownership of parental land holdings. In order for cocoyam cultivation to be economically sustainable and beneficial to female farmers, land reform and public policy would have to shift towards a more gender equal practice of agriculture.

=== Environment ===
In a commercialized setting where cocoyams require mass cultivation, the problem of pests and diseases will increase in severity. Cocoyam root rot disease and taro leaf blight are common to cocoyam crops. These diseases can exceed one growing season due to the cocoyam’s propagation method of transmitting diseases onto the next generation, sometimes resulting in yield losses of up to 100%. Therefore, in order for cocoyam to become commercialized, Nepalese farmers need to be educated in disease prevention and given the proper inputs to eliminate the occurrence of the spread of disease. Cocoyam grows best in the mountainous and hill regions of Nepal, accounting for a combined 65% of all arable land. Although inputs such as fertilizer are increasingly important for intensive crop cultivation in these regions, manure remains the central source of soil fertility and nutrient replenishment. The mass production of cocoyam in this region would require chemical fertilizers rather than manure. The current system of land ownership in Nepal produces a short-term focus on land investment and production, ignoring long-term investments such as terracing and tree planting to avoid soil erosion and the use of fertilizers. The commercialization of cocoyam would require long-term investment in land and soil to enable mass production and sustainability.
