= Sonam Lhundrup =

Tibetan abbot and writer (1456–1531)

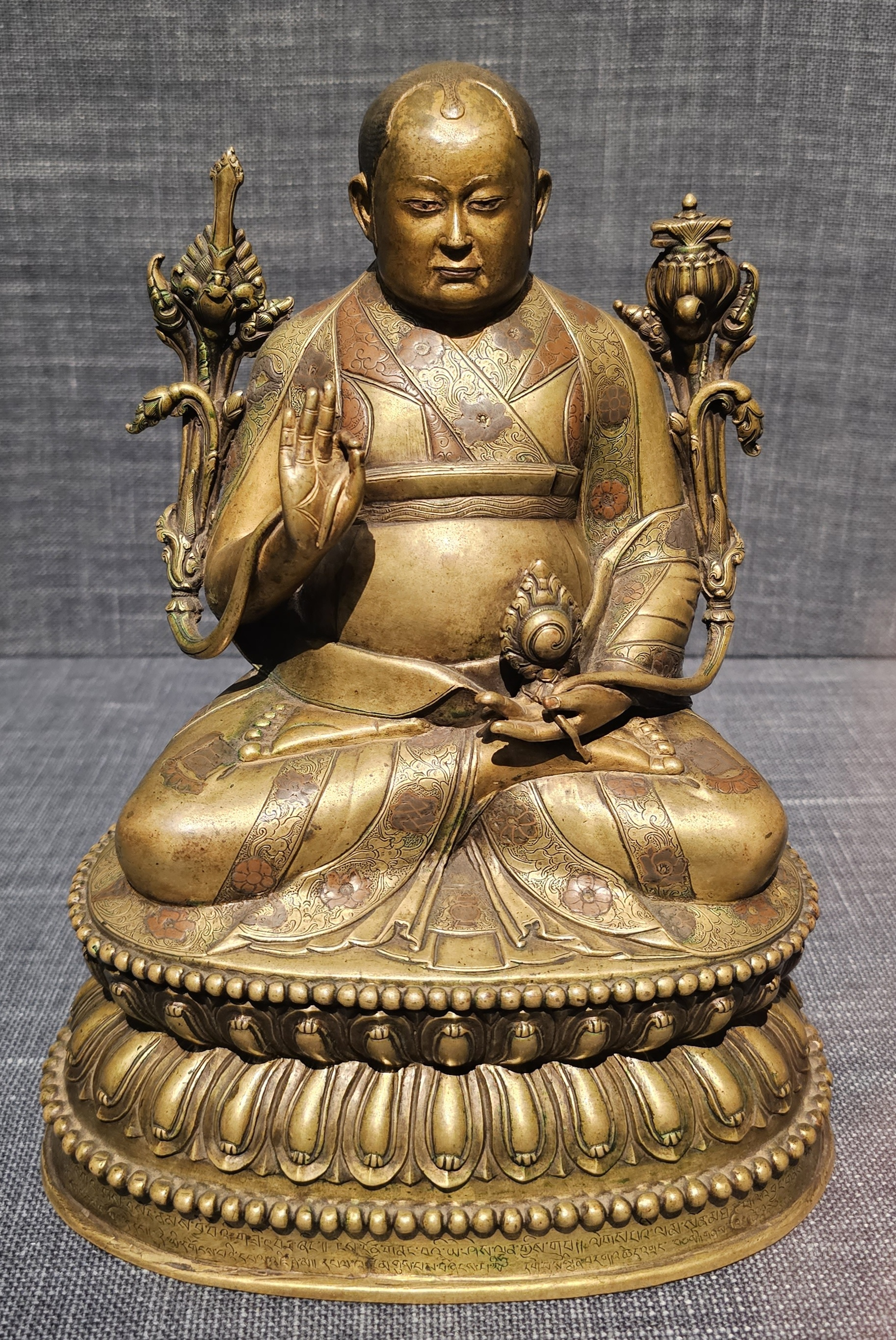
Statue of Sonam Lhundrup by Nepalese artist Namkha Drag, c. 1500s

Sonam Lhundrup (1456–1531) was a great abbot of Mustang and the son of the second Mustang Dharma King, Agon Sangpo.

He wrote a four-volume Buddhist scripture.
