= Foreign aid to Nepal =

Overview of aid

Nepal relies heavily on foreign aid, and donors coordinate development aid policy through the Nepal Development Forum, whose members include donor countries, international financial institutions (such as the World Bank), and inter-governmental organizations (such as the United Nations). The United Kingdom is Nepal's largest bilateral aid donor, and the World Bank and Asian Development Bank are the largest multilateral donors. Japan was the largest bilateral aid donor post the April 2015 Nepal earthquake. Donors have been reported as losing confidence in Nepal as a result of political interference and corruption in poverty relief efforts as well as the country's apparently poor capacity to utilize aid.

== Background ==
Nepal has been a recipient of foreign assistance since 1952 when it joined the Colombo Plan for Cooperative, Economic, and Social Development in Asia and the Pacific. The plan was established, under a slightly different name, by the Commonwealth of Nations in 1951. During the 1950s, many Nepalese received scholarships through the Colombo Plan to go to different countries for studies in technical and professional areas

Also during that time, all other aid was in the form of grants. The bulk of assistance was directed toward developing agriculture, transportation infrastructure, and power generation. Other areas targeted for assistance were communications, industry, education, and health. India and the United States each were responsible for more than one-third of all grants. Both countries established aid missions to Nepal and directed aid to special projects. Other major donors during the 1950s were the People's Republic of China and the Soviet Union. The United Kingdom, Switzerland, Australia, Japan, and New Zealand also were involved in lesser assistance programs. The United Nations (UN) provided some technical assistance.

Until the mid-1960s, Nepal depended mostly, if not totally, on foreign grants for all its development projects. Most of these grants were on a bilateral basis. Japan has been the largest donor country to Nepal. The single pillar bridge in Karnali, New Buspark, Tribhuvan University Teaching Hospital (TUTH), Melamchi drinking water project, few hydro-power projects and highways like B.P. Koirala Highway and the Koteshwor-Suryabinayak extended road (12 km) were built with assistance from Japan. Grants from India helped to build the airport in Kathmandu, the Koshi Dam, Bir Hospital, Trauma Center, highways like Tribhuvan Highway, Siddhartha Highway and several irrigation projects. The Soviet Union helped to build cigarette and sugar factories, a hydroelectric plant, and part of the East-West Highway (Nepal). Grants from China helped to construct roads; a trolley bus line in Kathmandu; BICC, Rastriya Sabha Griha, Civil Hospital in New Baneshwor, Bharatpur Cancer Hospital in Chitwan and leather, shoe, brick and tile factories. United States grants supported village development, agriculture, education, and public health. The United States also helped to build the Balaju Industrial Area and start the Nepal Industrial Development Corporation, which granted loans to several industries.

Beginning in the 1960s, some bilateral assistance was in the form of loans. The loan share of foreign aid increased from under 4 percent between 1965 and 1970 to more than 25 percent by the 1985-88 period.

In the 1970s, multilateral assistance programs started to play an important role in development planning and accounted for more than 70 percent of funding for development planning. By the end of the 1980s, the great majority of foreign aid was in the form of multilateral assistance programs. The major sources of borrowing or grants for these programs were the International Development Association of the World Bank and the Asian Development Bank. Most of these loans could be characterized as soft loans.

During Nepal's sixth Five Year Plan, the Nepali government began more actively encouraging foreign investment. The Foreign Investment and Technology Transfer Act of 1992 formalized these reforms.

Sources of foreign aid were numerous. Eleven UN agencies, seven multilateral lending agencies (such as the World Bank), and eight private agencies (for example, the Ford Foundation) had participated in aid programs. At least seventeen countries offered bilateral assistance. Under the auspices of World Bank, the Nepal Aid Group was created in 1976. By 1987 sixteen countries and six international agencies participated in the group. The level of commitment from the Nepal Aid Group had increased from Rs1.5 billion in 1976-77 to Rs5.6 billion in 1987-88. The bulk of foreign aid contributions after 1976 came from this group.

Most economic development projects were funded with external assistance on concessional terms. In the mid- to late 1980s, recorded aid disbursements averaged more than US$200 million annually—about 7 percent of GDP. More than 70 percent of the aid was in the form of grants; the remainder was in the form of concessional loans. A high percentage of technical assistance and direct aid payments were not documented. Much of the aid granted was underused.

By 1991, Nepal was receiving external assistance in the form of project aid, commodity aid, technical assistance, and program aid. Project aid funded irrigation programs, hydroelectric plants, and roads. Commodity assistance targets included fertilizers, improved seeds, and construction materials provided by donor aid agencies. Technical assistance covered services of experts to advise the government in training indigenous personnel to perform research in technological fields and resulted in the development of skilled labor. Program aid supported various projects, in particular the agricultural and health fields.

Dependence on foreign aid was increasing. Between 1984 and 1987, foreign aid as a percentage of GNP increased from under 8 percent to almost 13 percent. Debt service as a percentage of GDP increased from less than 0.1 percent in 1974-75 to almost 1 percent in 1987-88. Outstanding debt in this period increased from Rs346 million to almost Rs21 billion.

From FY 1970 through FY 1988, United States commitments, including United States Export-Import Bank funds, totaled US$285 million. In the 1980s, bilateral United States economic assistance channelled through the Agency for International Development averaged US$15 million annually. The United States also contributed to various international institutions and private voluntary organizations that serviced Nepal for a total contribution to multilateral aid in excess of US$250 million in the 1980s. Other Western countries and official development assistance and bilateral commitments for the 1980-87 period totaled US$1.8 billion. The Organization of Petroleum Exporting Countries (OPEC) provided US$30 million in bilateral aid from 1979 to 1989. Communist countries provided US$273 million in aid from 1970 to 1988. From 1981 until 1988, Japan was the premier source of bilateral ODA for Nepal, accounting for more than one-third of all funds. The second biggest donor during that period was the Federal Republic of Germany (West Germany).

According to World Bank figures, official development assistance increased from US$8.2 million in 1960 to US$369 million in 2003 and then fell to US$177 million in 2004. According to Nepal's Ministry of Finance, total foreign aid committed in fiscal year (FY) 2003 was US$555 million, with 63.3 percent in grants and 36.7 percent in loans. In FY2004, total foreign aid committed was US$320 million, of which 37.7 percent was grants and 62.3 percent, loans. In June 2004, active World Bank credits totaled US$302 million, with the greatest portions allocated to the financial sector (US$91.5 million)and to energy and mining (US$75.6 million). By the end of 2012, the outstanding World Bank IDA loan totaled $1.48 billion.

A report in 2013 have cited challenges to the delivery of the foreign aided projects in Nepal caused by delayed procurement of equipment and components, difficulty finding suitable contractors, internal disturbances and administrative inefficiency. Donors have been reported as losing confidence in Nepal as a result of political interference and corruption in poverty relief efforts as well as the country's apparently poor capacity to utilize aid.

The top bilateral donors of Official Development Assistance (ODA) in the early 2010s were the United Kingdom and Japan. Japan was the largest bilateral donor post the April 2015 Nepal earthquake and the World Bank the largest donor overall. India and China are also major foreign aid donors to Nepal. As of 2022-23, the United Kingdom is Nepal's largest bilateral aid donor, and the World Bank and Asian Development Bank are the largest multilateral donors.

== Non Governmental Organizations ==
Beginning in the 1950s, NGOs began to appear across Nepal to meet basic human needs of Nepali citizens, not met by the government. The number of NGOs rose sharply in the 1990s as a response to multiple factors, including the transition to a multi-party political system in Nepal. These organizations seek to address a variety of developmental issues within Nepal, with many focusing on healthcare infrastructure, political reform, and social development. In most cases, the funding to support these organizations comes from outside of the country.

Neoliberal privatization can also be considered a push factor behind the increased amount of NGOs within Nepal. As Nepal has increasingly pursued a liberal, free market economic structure, NGOs and INGOs have arrived to fill in the gaps in Nepal's welfare. Despite the wide growth of NGOs in Nepal, key developmental markers for the country have not shown any major systemic improvement on a national scale. Local improvements in quality of life and access to services may be more easily seen across the country.

The Social Welfare Council is a governmental body established for the regulation and direction of NGOs within Nepal. This department was established in 1992 under the Social Welfare Act 2049. The goal of this department is to coordinate the efforts of NGOs to be in alignment with the government of Nepal's goals, and to reduce duplicated efforts by NGOs. The goals of the Social Welfare Council include providing welfare to and promoting rights of children, older people, disabled people, women, victims of crime and addiction, and the poor and jobless.

== Alternatives ==
Social entrepreneurs try to address development issues through individual, financially sustainable and more home-grown initiatives. The first Social Entrepreneurship Awards in 2011 and in 2012 encouraged those changemakers.

== See also ==
- Economy of Nepal
- Foreign relations of Nepal
