= Nepalese honey with tejpat oil =

Tamala honey is a unique processed product from oil extracted from an indigenous tree species to Nepal, Cinnamomum tamala ("tejpat"), and incorporated into honey for digestion. With the rise of the tea industry in North America, C.tamala honey has its appeal and potential as a natural sweetener.

== Cinnamomum tamala in Nepal ==
C.tamala is an indigenous tree species to Nepal, grown between 450–2100 m elevation. Naturally grown in the tropical and subtropical Himalayas, mid-hills district of Nepal. These trees are ideal for cash crop farming because of the essential oils that can be extracted from the leaves. Yields are sufficient due to the longevity of each tree, being able to live and bear leaves up to 100 years, while the leaves can be collected after the first ten. The average annual yield per tree is 40–100 kg/tree with collections being made from October–March, providing a long season for the collection of the leaves. Labour is required to manually collect leaves from the trees. Many farmers prefer hand picking as the use of tools can potentially damage the trees. Tejpat trees on subsistent farms in the villages of Udayapur District range from 10-155 trees per household.

Oil Extraction

Extraction of oil from the Tejpat leaves has been explored through superheated water extraction (SHWE), providing a potentially environmentally friendly process. Further research is needed for environmentally friendly extraction methods, and the availability of this technology in Nepal is necessary.

== Nepalese honey ==
Honey is emerging as one of the leading export products of Nepal and has a growing market. Nepal produces 864 metric tons of honey. Honey from the hill mountain region offers an exotic taste. Beekeeping in Nepal is regarded as a very rewarding occupation for many people. Nepal is host to five species of honeybee, but only the Asian hive bee (Ampis cerana) and the European honeybee (Apis mellifera) are kept in hives to manage for honey production. Communities who do not practice traditional beekeeping techniques called ‘honey hunters’, collect honey from the nests of wild species. Wild (organic) honey produced by Apis dorsata contains large amounts of enzymes and amino acids, attributing a good price in international markets.

== Industry opportunities ==
Narrowing in on the Palpa District in the Middle Hills of Nepal, local sale and trade of Tejpat markets sustains the livelihood of many families through contributing to household economy. Exports of Tejpat from the Palpa district to India and neighbouring countries show an increase, proving the potential for income generation for poor and disadvantaged Nepalese farmers.

Honey is considered one of the most effective and inexpensive home remedies. Richness of bees and floral resources offer good potential for niche market. Due to lack of education, Nepali farmers are often unable to meet the quality specified by buyers for their honey. Farming bees in Nepal requires minimal start up investment and generally yields profits within the first year of operation. Assurance of quality is key to improving access to international markets. Honey processing in the case of poor farmers requires the simple access to and use of bowls, a sieve or straining cloth, and containers.

== Tejpat farming ==
Lack of education of market opportunities, limited access to transportation, and unfair bartering are some of the many concerns local Nepalese farmers have with the sale of Tejpat. There is economic potential, prompting concern regarding the conservation of this species. In-situ and ex-situ methods of conservation, including gene and seed banks, are beneficial for future opportunities this crop should provide.

Beekeeping is one of the major income sources mainly for farmers who have limited options for cash income. Honeybees provide ecological functions, including benefits for better farm yields through pollination services.

Impact on Nepalese women and children

There is confidence and personality building potential through education of community forest preservation methods. Rural women and forest has close relation. Women spend a lot of time in the forests (leaf collection and maintenance), a daily necessity associated with livelihood. A general assumption is that Nepalese women do not know about marketing and have no ability of bargaining; therefore they are limited to access of gaining this knowledge. Men dominate in gaining access to agricultural services, community training activities and finances than women. Women need efficient training and education to come from the potential this product has in production.

Local Nepali communities promote the involvement and participation of women in beekeeping. There are 17 women groups formed in Jumla district of Nepal regarding the practice of beekeeping. Beekeeping provides entrepreneurial opportunities.

== Tejpat oil infused honey ==
Through production of this honey product, poor farmers in Nepal can benefit due to the collection of and the farming involved with Tejpat, along with the local beekeeping efforts throughout many communities in Nepal. The exotic flavour of organic Nepali honey infused with the Tejpat oil, attributing a natural cinnamon like aroma, creates a marketable product.
