= Nepalese sorghum =

Species of grain

Sorghum is an important staple crop for more than 500 million people in sub-Saharan Africa and South Asia, including many people in Nepal. In statistics collected from 1992 to 1994 about general millet, Nepal had an area of 0.21 million ha, with a yield rate of 1.14 (t/ha), and produced around 0.24 million tons of sorghum. The entirety of the crop is highly valued, with both the grain and the stem being utilized. The Terai region of Nepal tends to be more tropical which is ideal for the growth of sorghum. It tolerates hot climates better than maize or soybeans. For subsistence farmers, like those in Nepal, fertilizers are not necessary and the crop is frequently harvested by hand.

== Background ==
Sorghum (Sorghum bicolor) comes from the Latin name "syrucum (granum)" which means "grain of Syria" however it originated in eastern Africa. Sorghum is an important species of the grass family, Poaceae, and is considered the world's fifth most important cereal crop. There are many diverse and wild types of sorghum, however there are seven basic races, the most common in Asia are Durra and Sballu. Sorghum is an important staple crop for more than 500 million people in sub-Saharan Africa and South Asia, including many people in Nepal. Sorghum is grown on more than 48 ha area around the world. Overall sorghum is a very important crop worldwide, and can be cooked in many different ways for food with a high nutritional content, among many other uses.

In statistics collected from 1992 to 1994 about general millet, Nepal had an area of 0.21 million ha, with a yield rate of 1.14 (t/ha), and produced around 0.24 million tons of sorghum. The entirety of the crop is highly valued, both the grain and the stem are very useful.

== Environmental factors ==
There are several different types of sorghum such as grain sorghum, grass sorghum, sweet sorghum and broomcorn. Grain sorghum usually requires less water than other crops such as maize, and produces higher yields in hotter areas such as Africa and Asia. Nepal's climate ranges from tropical to a more arctic climate depending on the altitude. The Terai region of Nepal is a southern part of the country and tends to be more tropical with a hot, humid climate. This is prime for the growth of sorghum. Sorghum is well adapted to dryer climates and tolerates hot climates better than maize or soybeans. It is a warm season grass and has adapted to grow in a wide range of soil types often tolerating waterlogging and many poor soil types.

Sorghum grows best deep in soil with a more neutral pH level around 6 to 7. Depending on the moisture level, plants tend to be planted in rows with around a 45 to 60 cm space. If there is a 12 to 20 cm space directly between plants it allows for approximately 120, 000 plants to be planted per hectare. The quality and yields of sorghum is directly related to both biotic and abiotic stresses. Problematic soils such as acidic soil are a frequent problem for farmers. Weeds reduce yields and compete with sorghum. Weeds that are commonly associated with Sorghum are striga, shattercane, and jonsongrass. Other common pests and diseases in sorghum are anthacnose, and greenbug. It is important to include genetic diversity to stabilize yield because it can be insurance against unexpected pests and disease outbreaks.

== Social factors ==
=== Nutrition ===
In Africa and Asia sorghum is primarily used for traditional purposes with subsistence and small-scale farming. The use was traditionally for food. In Asia and Africa sorghum is often boiled, roasted, or popped, used as flat bread or eaten as porridge. Sorghum is also grown in the southern parts of the United States however it is mostly used for animal feeds.

To many people the nutritional elements of sorghum are unknown however it is a very important whole grain. The grains can be eaten in many ways such as in cold salads, or an alternative to couscous, or rice. A huge advantage is that it can be used as a gluten free substitute to regular white flour. It can be used for baking in things such as cookies, muffins, cakes, and breads. Sweet sorghum can be processed into syrups and molasses. Sorghum has also traditionally been used for alcoholic beverages and malt drinks.

Sorghum is naturally high in fiber and iron, as well as protein. Sorghum also has great health affects; it is a principal source of energy, vitamins and minerals. A sorghum grain contains 11.3% protein, 3.3% fat and 56-73% starch as well, it is relatively rich in iron, zinc, phosphorus and B-complex vitamins. Because it is rich in antioxidants it is believed by some that it helps lower the risk of cancer, diabetes heart disease and some neurological diseases.

=== General care and maintenance ===
In the tropical regions sorghum is generally easy to care for, it can survive off rainfall and is planted on the onset of Monsoon season, which is around mid to late June. Sorghum can produce high yields where the precipitation is low and erratic. For subsistence farmers, like those in Nepal, fertilizers are not necessary however doses of nitrogen fertilizers do tend to be used in larger scale operations. Sorghum can and is frequently harvested by hand.

=== Gender ===
The demand for sorghum has decreased in Asia over the last number of years. However, there are many attractive traits for female subsistence farmers, especially with specialty, dual-purpose seeds. The nutrition received from Sorghum is important for subsistence farmer families, as well as for regular income for female farmers and their families. Sorghum does not need very much general care and tends to produce high yields.

=== Economic factors ===
The cost efficiency of Sorghum tends to depend on the environment. Sorghum can be a significant crop for animal feed, which is important for those living in Nepal with animals. All parts of the plant, both the grain and stem can be sold and used. A huge advantage of sorghum to subsistence farmers in places in Africa and Asia, specifically in Nepal is that Sorghum is actually one of the few crops that will be able to adapt to future climate change as it contains many resilient qualities. In addition, the cost of production in Asia has been said to have decreased (per ton) between the 1980s and 1990s compared to the cost in the 1970s. The cost and return ratio from improved varieties in Asia is around a 1:1.4 ratio. This is a good ratio for subsistence farmers.
