= Dhaubadi =

Dhaubadi (Nepali: धौबादी) is the village in Northern part of Nawalparasi District, Gandaki Province, Nepal. Known for huge iron reserves, it has attracted national & international attention.
