= Nepal Physical Society =

Professional society of Nepalese physicists

Nepal Physical Society (NPS) is a professional society of the Nepalese physicists. The small society of about 500 members was established in 1982.

== Membership ==
To be eligible for membership, one has to hold a minimum of a master's degree in physical science from either Tribhuvan University or another university that is recognized by Tribhuvan University. The NPS offers two kinds of memberships in general: Ordinary Membership and Life Membership. Ordinary Membership is to be renewed every year by paying a nominal membership fee. Life membership can be obtained by paying the fee designated for life membership. An executive body is formed by general convention in every two years.

Nepal Physical Society signed the agreement to be a reciprocal society with the American Physical Society (APS) on September 21, 1995. This society is also a member of Association of Asia Pacific Physical societies (AAPPs).

== Activities ==
The society organizes different scientific and educational activities related to physical sciences in Nepal. These activities include lectures and classes on topics in physics like Group Theory. These lectures are intended for people who want to broaden their knowledge in the field of physics. The society publishes Nepal Physical Society News letters on a regular basis. Previously, the office of the society was situated in Tri-Chandra College, Ghantaghar, Kathmandu, Nepal. Currently, the office is in the Central Department of Physics, Tribhuvan University, Kirtipur, Nepal. Nepal Physical Society participated in the 38th International Physics Olympiad in 2007.

== See also ==
- Nepal Mathematical Society
