= Bhote Koshi Power Plant =

- Location of the Bhote Koshi Project in Nepal
- Country: Nepal
- Location: Sindhulpalchok District
- Coordinates: 27°54′46″N 85°55′26″E
- Status: Operational
- Construction began: 1997
- Opening date: 2000
- Construction cost: US$98 million

Dam and spillways
- Type of dam: Gravity
- Impounds: Bhote Koshi
- Height: 5 m (16 ft)
- Length: 60 m (200 ft)
- Elevation at crest: 1,435 m (4,708 ft)
- Spillways: Controlled overflow
- Spillway type: 2 x radial gates
- Spillway capacity: 1,044 m^{3}/s (36,900 cu ft/s)

Reservoir
- Catchment area: 2,132 km (1,325 mi)
- Normal elevation: 1,434 m (4,705 ft)

Power Station
- Operators: Bhote Koshi Power Company Private Limited (Owned by Himal International Energy Pvt. Ltd. Himal International Power Corp Pvt. Ltd. Tara Fund Pvt. Ltd. RDC of Nepal)
- Commission date: 2001
- Type: Run-of-river
- Hydraulic head: 135.5 m (445 ft) (normal)
- Turbines: 2 X 22 MW Francis-type
- Installed capacity: 36 MW; Max. planned: 45 MW
- Annual generation: 246 GWh

The Bhote Koshi Power Plant (also known as Upper Bhote Koshi Project) is a run-of-the-river power plant in Sindhulpalchok District, Nepal. It was constructed between 1997 and 2000 with power generation starting in January 2001. The project cost about US$98 million. The majority of finances was provided by Panda Energy International. The dam, located at 27°56′20″N 85°56′42″E, diverts water downstream into a 3,300 m (10,827 ft) long head race tunnel which terminates into two penstocks that supply the two 22 MW Francis turbine-generators with water. The drop in elevation between the dam and power plant affords a normal hydraulic head of 135.5 m (445 ft).

The installed capacity of the project is 45 MW, whereas it has a power purchase agreement (PPA) with Nepal Electricity Authority for generation of 36MW maximum. The PPA dictates how much the project can generate for each month of the Nepali Calendar. During monsoon season (about three months each year) Bhote Koshi can operate at full installed capacity, with excess water still being spilt. During the winter season, power generation from the plant decreases drastically due to lower water levels.
