= .np =

Internet country-code top level domain for Nepal

- Introduced: 25 January 1995
- TLD type: Country code top-level domain
- Status: Active
- Registry: Mercantile Communication Pvt Ltd
- Sponsor: Mercantile Communication Pvt Ltd
- Intended use: Entities connected with Nepal
- Registration restrictions: Local presence requirement; names must be based on company/organization or brand name
- Structure: Registrations are made at the third level beneath various second-level names
- Documents: Terms and conditions
- Registry website: .np domain registration

.np is the Internet country code top-level domain (ccTLD) for Nepal. It is administered by Mercantile Communication Pvt Ltd.

== Registration ==
Domain registrations under .np ccTLD is free of cost. Registrants need to provide proof of Nepali citizenship for personal websites or a copy of company registration for organization websites. Foreign nationals with a Non-Resident-Nepalese ID Card or Nepalese resident visa can also register a domain. Foreign companies are required to have an official presence in Nepal as a joint venture, partnership, agent, or a licensee in order to qualify to register a domain. It could take a working day to get the domain reviewed.

Registering a .np domain in Nepal typically involves providing specific documents. These include a completed Registration Application Form, obtainable from the official registry or chosen domain registrar. A formal cover Letter for np domain must be submitted, addressing the purpose and use of the domain to the .np domain registry. Applicants can include primary and secondary name servers if they want to point it to a web hosting provider.

=== Requirements ===
For individuals, a photocopy of their Citizenship Certificate is usually required. Organizations need to furnish a photocopy of their Company Registration Certificate. In cases where a third party handles registration, a Letter of Authorization may be necessary.

Information about Domain Name Servers (DNS) is also needed, encompassing primary and secondary DNS details. Multiple domain name preferences may be requested in case of unavailability. A registration fee is commonly associated with acquiring a .np domain, though costs may vary. Depending on the nature of the registration, additional documentation might be needed for specific organizations or government entities.

Registered domain name must be an exact match, abbreviation or acronym of the registrant's name of trademark; or otherwise closely and substantially connected to the registrant.

A domain name must include the following:

- The exact same name of the registrant of a trademark, an acronym or abbreviation of that name;
- At least three characters must be included in the domain name.
- Alphanumeric characters and dashes (hyphens) can be used, but not in the first and last characters.
- Names with offensive, generic, or inflammatory words will not be registered.
- Cover letter with valid stamped requesting the domain name.

.gov.np domains are managed by and registered through Integrated Data Management Center (also known as National Information Technology Center).

=== .np Domain Registration and Modification ===
Mercantile Communications Pvt. Ltd. administers general domains, while .gov.np domains are overseen by the Integrated Data Management Center (IDMC), also known as the National Information Technology Center (NITC).

== Structure ==
Registrations are taken only at the third level, under a number of second-level domains.

Second level domain name	Intended use
.com.np	Commercial. Because it is an open domain, any person or entity is permitted to register
.coop.np	Cooperatives
.edu.np	Educational institutions, such as primary, middle, secondary schools, colleges, and universities
.gov.np	Nepalese government and governmental entities
.info.np	Information. Because it is an open domain, any person or entity is permitted to register
.mil.np	Nepalese military
.name.np	Individuals, by name. Because it is an open domain, any person or entity is permitted to register. However, registrations may be challenged later if they are not by individuals (or the owners of fictional characters)
.net.np	Networks or "portal" sites
.org.np	Non-profit organisations
