= Nepalese Children's Education Fund =

The Nepalese Children's Education Fund (NCEF) is a non-profit organization that has been working to develop the potential of disadvantaged Nepalese children through education.

Since its establishment in 2002, NCEF has targeted students from economically disadvantaged families, who would otherwise be unable to send their children to school. NCEF also extends its support to ethnically marginalized groups, orphans and girls with its belief in the power of education. With the help of volunteers in both Nepal and around the world, NCEF has been expanding its work in both rural and urban regions of Nepal.

== Operation in Nepal ==
NCEF operates in the following regions in Nepal:

1. Kathmandu, the capital city of Nepal. NCEF started its operation in Kathamandu in 2002.
2. Kavre. The Kavrepalanchowk district is located 1.5 hour drive away from Kathmandu, the capital city of Nepal. Despite its proximity to the capital, Kavre remains isolated from the mainstream of development, especially education. NCEF started its operation in Kavre in 2002.
3. Nepalgunj, the headquarters of Banke District, Nepalgunj is located approximately 520 km from Kathmandu. Banke District is the main central point of the Mid-Western Region. Nepalgunj airport is a key air service facilities center for most of the inaccessible districts of Mid and Far -Western region. It is the main business spot of Western Nepal. Nepalgunj is seeing increasing urbanization and population, which have consequences in the various areas like health and education, especially to girls. NCEF started its operation in Nepalgunj in 2002.
4. Palpa, located 110 km from Pokhara, a major tourist-attraction city of Nepal. NCEF started its operation in Palpa in 2006.
5. Patan, one of the three cities located within the Kathmandu valley. NCEF started its operation in Patan in 2005.

== Student selection ==
Volunteers in Nepal, especially area coordinators, identify potential candidates for the scholarship, assist in filling out application forms by visiting candidates or through coordination with school teachers. Then they send the scanned applications to the US Selection Committee, which comprises volunteers both from NCEF and outside. Once the Selection Committee makes a decision, area coordinators relay that decision to candidates, and then continue the process of enrolling selected students into schools and providing them with education material.

Detailed student selection criteria are listed in NCEF's official website:

== Legal status ==
The United States: NCEF is a 501(c)(3) charitable organization. US Taxpayer ID: 51–0424140. Donations are fully tax-deductible.

Nepal: NCEF is registered with the Social Welfare Council Nepal under the name of its sister organization Campaign For Education (CE).
