= Mero Air =

Mero Air was an airline based in Nepal.

== History ==
The Civil Aviation Authority of Nepal granted Mero Air an air operators certificate in 2005. Despite this, by 2007 the airline had failed to start operations.
