= Hello Nepal =

Satellite telecommunications company

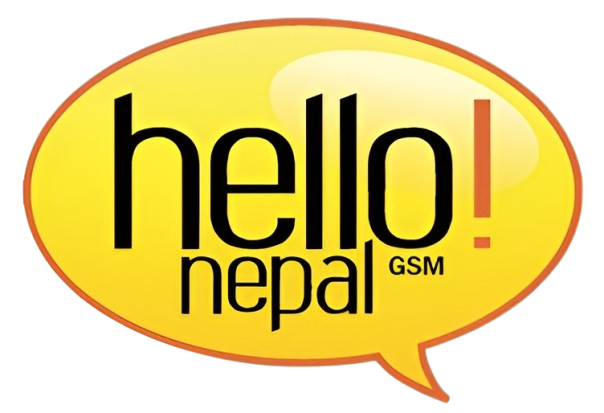
- Industry: Telecommunication
- Fate: Inactive
- Area served: Nepal
- Services: Prepaid / postpaid mobile services
- Number of employees: 100+
- Website: www.hellonepalgsm.com

Hello Nepal was a private telecom company operating in Nepal. It was the third private company providing GSM service in Nepal, but the first to start the service from the rural part of the country which is least developed and without any infrastructure.

The company acquired its cellular license from the Nepal Telecommunications Authority (NTA) to operate under the brand name Hello Nepal, setting mid-western region as its operational base.

The NTA cancelled its licence for failing to pay dues in Nov 2021.

== Products ==
- GSM - Fixed line service
- GSM - Prepaid and postpaid mobile service
