= SmartCell =

Telecommunication company of Nepal

- Company type: Private Company
- Industry: Telecommunications
- Headquarters: Lalitpur, Bagmati Province
- Area served: Nepal
- Products: Mobile Telephony, GSM, GPRS, 4G LTE
- Services: Mobile telephony, and fixed-line internet services
- Website: smarttel.com.np

Smart or STPL (Smart Telecom Private Limited) was a private mobile network service provider of Nepal and it was established on 1 July 2008.

== Coverage ==
With 4G, 4G Lite And 2G services across 45 districts out of 75 in Nepal. Expanding their 4G network to altogether 19 districts in Nepal, it is now currently available in Kathmandu, Lalitpur, Bhaktapur, Kavre, Kaski, Nawalparasi, Banke, Dang, Kailali, Bardiya, Kanchanpur, Parsa, Dhanusa, Chitwan, Saptari, Siraha, Morang, Jhapa and Sunsari. Whereas, 2G is available in 26 districts; Ramechhap, Sindupalchowk, Sindhuli, Dolakha, Nuwakot, Dhading, Syangja, Parbat, Baglung, Palpa, Gulmi, Gorkha, Lamjung, Tanahun, Rupandehi, Kapilvastu, Achham, Bajura, Doti, Baitadi, Bajhang, Bara, Sarlahi, Rautahat, Mahottari and Makwanpur.

After failing to pay permit and service operation dues, the government has taken control of Smart Telecom Private Limited (STPL).
