= Ncell =

Nepalese telecommunications company

Ncell Axiata Limited
- Type: Public
- Industry: Telecommunications
- Founded: 2004; 22 years ago
- Headquarters: Lainchaur, Kathmandu
- Area served: Nepal
- Products: Mobile Telephony, GSM, GPRS, EDGE, 3G, 4G,5g HSPA+, DC-HSDPA
- Number of employees: 500+ (as of 2021)
- Parent: Spectrlite UK Limited (80%)
- Website: www.ncell.com.np

Ncell (Nepali: एनसेल) is a mobile service provider from Nepal. It is Nepal's largest company in terms of revenue market share and second largest telecommunications company, after Nepal Telecom in terms of subscriber base.

The company was founded in 2004 when there was only one major telecom operator at the time, Nepal Telecom. Nepal Telecom had been providing PSTN and GSM services. Investing in telecommunications and competing with governmental agencies was a major risk at the time. With the entry of Ncell, the Nepali telecommunications sector progressed due to greater competition in the market.

== History ==
Nepal's first private mobile operator, Spice Nepal Private Limited, was founded in 2004. The company introduced its commercial services as Mero Mobile on 17 September 2005 in Kathmandu.

Swedish telecommunications company and mobile network operator TeliaSonera bought a controlling interest in the company in October 2008.

Spice Nepal was renamed Ncell on 12 March 2010 as part of the acquisition and TeliaSonera invested approximately 1 billion dollars in the improvement and coverage of the network. Ncell had reached all areas of Nepal by 2010 and had launched 3G services by the end of the year. Ncell also constructed the east–west fiber link connectivity during this time, which was necessary to support the data and voice traffic across the country.

It was announced on 21 December 2015 that TeliaSonera took exit from Ncell by selling its 60.4 percent stake in the company to the Malaysian telecommunications group Axiata. On 1 June 2017, the company began providing 4G/LTE service in the Kathmandu Valley, including Nagarkot, Banepa, and Dhulikhel in the Kavrepalanchowk district. Ncell has expanded its 4G/LTE coverage covering 90 percent of total population. Ncell became a public limited company on 3 August 2020, and its name was changed to Ncell Axiata Limited.

Ncell parent company Axiata left the company in 2023, the parent company has been reporting the downturn of revenues from Ncell and that seems to be the main reason for its exit.

On 1 December 2023, the United Kingdom-based Spectrlite UK Limited acquired 100 percent shares of Reynolds Holdings Limited from Axiata UK of Axiata Group Berhad. Reynolds previously owned an 80 percent equity stake in Ncell. With Spectrlite UK Limited, Ncell has become a 100 percent Nepali-origin, owned company.

== Technology ==
On 1 June 2017, Ncell launched its 4G/LTE service in Kathmandu Valley (including the areas of Nagarkot, Banepa and Dhulikhel of Kavrepalanchowk district). A month later, the company launched 4G/LTE service in Pokhara and Damauli (two western cities of Nepal). As of December 2021, Ncell expanded 4G/LTE service ensuring access to over 75% of total population, covering all seven Nepali provinces. In a bid to implement a next-generation billing system, Ncell adopted Alibaba Group's Apsara Cloud for its digital strategy.

In 2010, when Ncell was still owned by TeliaSonera, its highest 3G base station was built near one of the Everest Base Camps at an altitude of 5,200 meters (17,000 feet).

Ncell provides a self-service app which is relied upon by a majority of users. By installing the Ncell app, customers can recharge their account, check balance information, and purchase data/voice packs. The app can be also used to send 10 free SMS messages daily; however, data charges may apply if the app is used outside of Nepal.

== See also ==
- Nepal Telecom
- Telecommunications in Nepal
