= Koteshwor =

Koteshwar कोटेश्वर
- neighbourhood
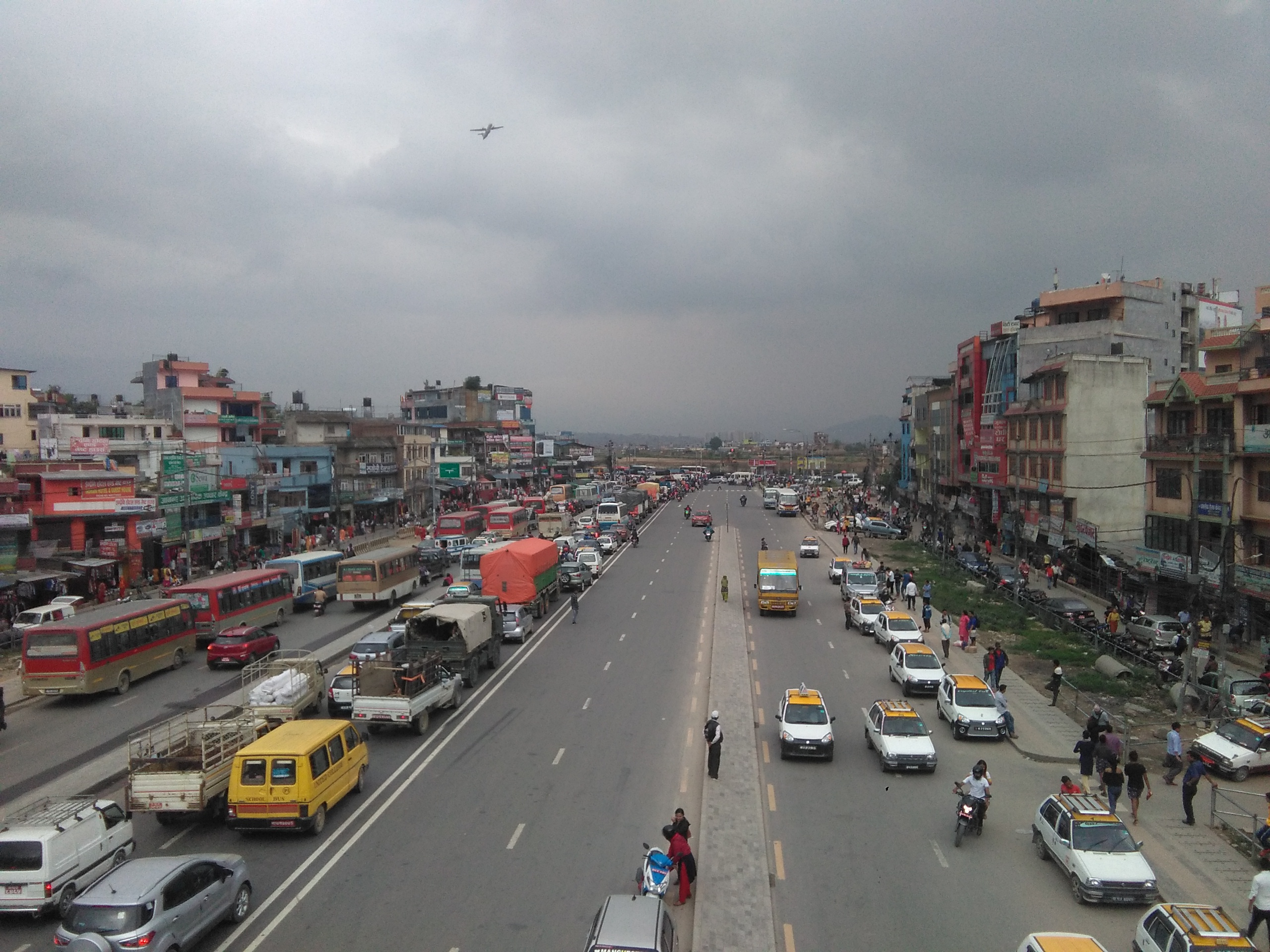
- View of Koteshwar

- Location in Kathmandu
- Coordinates: 27°41′N 85°21′E
- Country: Nepal
- Province: Bagmati
- District: Kathmandu
- Municipality: Kathmandu
- Area: Kathmandu
- Ward No.: 32
- Named for: Koteshwor Mahadevsthan

Area
  - Total: 4.34 km^{2} (1.68 sq mi)

Population (2011)
  - Total: 76,299
  - Density: 17,600/km^{2} (45,500/sq mi)
- Time zone: UTC+5:45 (Nepal Time)

Koteshwar is a place, located in Kathmandu District. In 1991, Kathmandu Metropolitan City was expanded by incorporating Koteshwar as Ward No. 32 (previously 35). It encompasses 395 hectares and is bounded by the Manohara river in the east and south, the Bagmati river in the west, and share borders with Gothatar in the north, Madhyapur Thimi municipality of Bhaktapur District in east and Lalitpur metropolitan city in the south. With respect to basic services, almost all homes in the ward have access to electricity, but the same cannot be said about drinking water. At the time of the 1991 Nepal census it had a population of 5,787 living in 1,154 households. The ward contains 8,716 households. The population in 2001 was 35,184.

== History ==
The name of Koteshwar was derived from the name of Shiva temple, Koteshwar Mahadev. At the time of Malla period, Koteshwar was a tri-border area along the junction of three Malla Kingdoms were Kantipur, Patan and Bhaktapur. Initially the settlement of people started from Koteshwar Mahadevsthan area.

== Education and institutions ==
=== Colleges and Schools ===
- Koteshwor Multiple Campus - The oldest campus of the city, which is located in Jadibuti. This campus has played a vital role on the higher education history of Nepal. Established in 1947, Koteshwor Multiple Campus stands synonymous to the academic institution itself-largely because it was the first step in the mammoth growth of the institution and also because the corporate identity of the stakeholders is reflected in the name of public campus.
- V.S. Niketan Higher Secondary School - V.S. Niketan is located in Minbhawan and Tinkune, Kathmandu, Nepal and schools over 4,000 students. You will find the entire campus of V.S. Niketan divided by Bagmati River. V.S. Education Foundation is the outcome of the institutional expansion of an education system aiming to coordinate all the educational activities of the institution so that the entity established at V.S. Niketan is uniformly maintained in all levels of teaching and learning under the same roof. The institution function form Pre-Primary to Bachelor's Levels of education. It has been awarded the "Best School of Nepal" for two times, recently.
- CCRC - The Capital College and Research Centre (CCRC) is a Nepali higher secondary school located in Koteshwor, Kathmandu.
- Everest College of Nursing - Everest College of Nursing (ECON) was established in 2010 with the vision of producing Health Professionals that could meet the demands of modern-day medicinal practice. Professionals need to be aware of advances in medical technologies.
- Kathmandu Barsha Higher Secondary School and College - Also known as KATHMANDU BARSHA located in Tinkunne, Koteshwor, Kathmandu.
- Manakamana English Boarding School - located as Koteshwor, Sahayogi Nagar.
- Triton International College - located in Subidha Nagar, Tinkunne.
- Nagarik College of Health Sciences - located at Koteshwor.
- Grammar Public Higher Secondary School - Grammar Public Higher Secondary School is located at Seti Opi Marga, Koteshwor, Kathmandu-35. Grammar Public Higher Secondary School was established in 1993.
- Kanjirowa National School - Kanjirowa National Higher Secondary School (formerly Kathmandu Don Bosco High School) is an independent co-educational institution. It was established in 1998 A.D by a team of educators and academicians. It is located at Koteshwor (Near Balkumari Bridge), Kathmandu, Nepal.
- Himalaya English Boarding Higher Secondary School - located at Koteshwor.
- Laligurans Batika Secondary School - LGBS is a co-educational institution. It was established in 1979 A.D. It is located at Bidhyanagar, Narephant, Koteshwor, Kathmandu, Nepal. Laligurans Batika Secondary School provides classes from 1 to 10.
- SOS Balgram, Koteshwor - SOS Koteshwor is next to Mahadevsthan and is located in Bāgmatī Zone, Central Region, Nepal.
- Kotdevi Public School, Narephat
- Jagriti Academy, Narephat
- Mount SEB Boarding School, Narephat - Mount SEB Boarding School was established in 1997.
- Brain Heart English School, Narephat

== Hospitals ==
- Kantipur Hospital Pvt. Ltd. - The Kantipur Hospital Private Limited was established in 2054 BS.

== Shopping Mall ==
Koteshwar, Kathmandu is developing as a hub center for the shopping Malls.

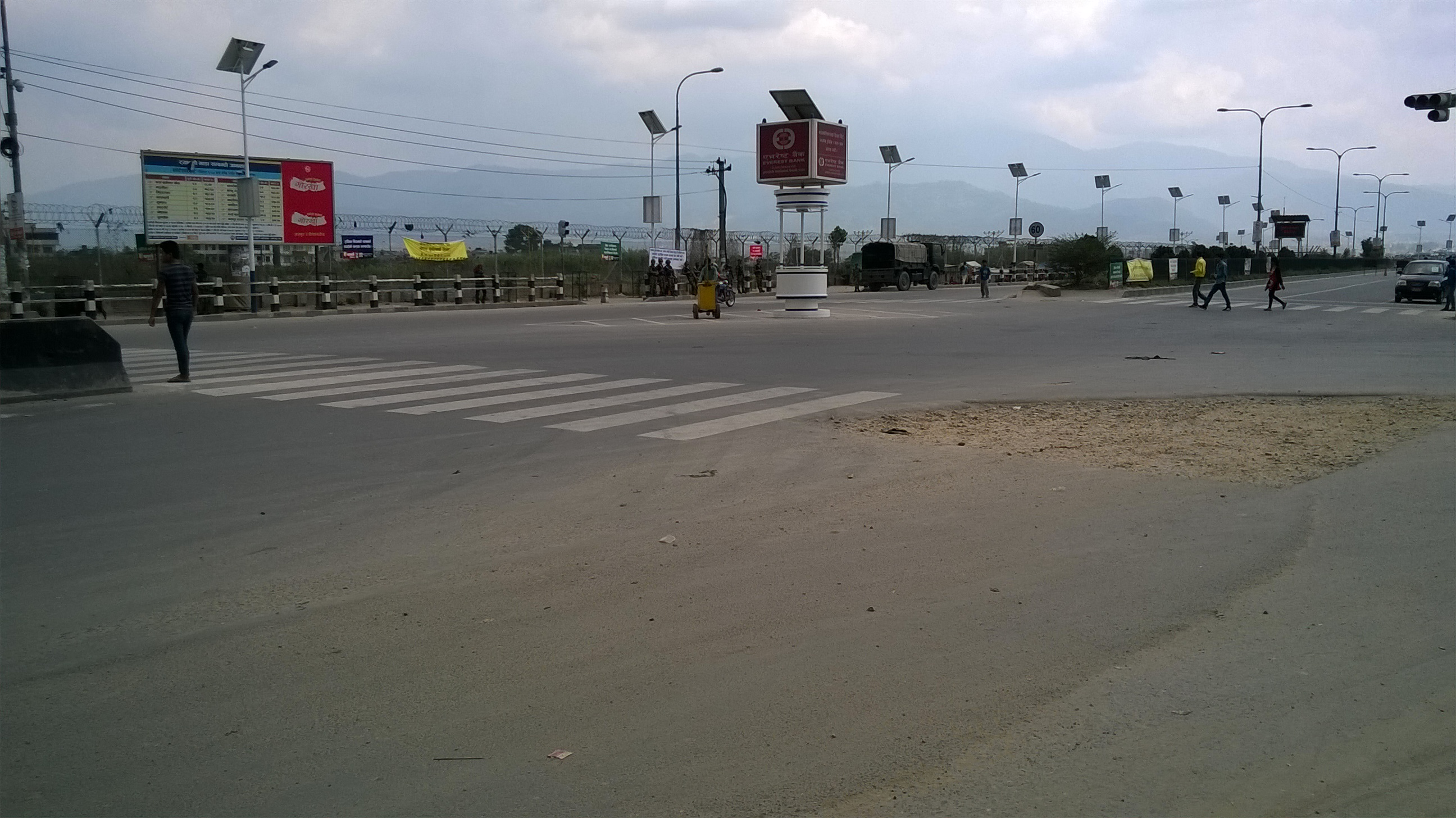
Near Koteshwar Central Junction

== Banks ==
Most of the major banks and financial institutions have their Branches in the area of Koteshwar, Kathmandu.

- Kumari Bank
- Prabhu Bank
- Laxmi Sunrise Bank
- Prime Bank
- Global IME Bank Limited
- Citizens Bank
- Siddhartha Bank
- Century Commercial Bank
- Agriculture Development Bank
- Jyoti Bikas Bank
- Janata Bank Nepal Limited
- NMB Bank Limited
- Nepal Credit and Commerce Bank
- Nepal Bank
- Nabil Bank
- NIC Asia Bank near Tinkune
- NIC Asia Bank Narephat
- Machhapuchchhre Bank
- Kailash Bikas Bank
- Everest Bank Jadibuti
- lumbini Bikas Bank Narephat
- Rastriya Banijya Bank

== See also ==
- Bagmati River
- Koteshwar Mahadev
- Kathmandu
- Kathmandu Metropolitan City
