= Securities board of Nepal =

Stock regulator of Nepal

Securities Board of Nepal
- नेपाल धितोपत्र बोर्ड
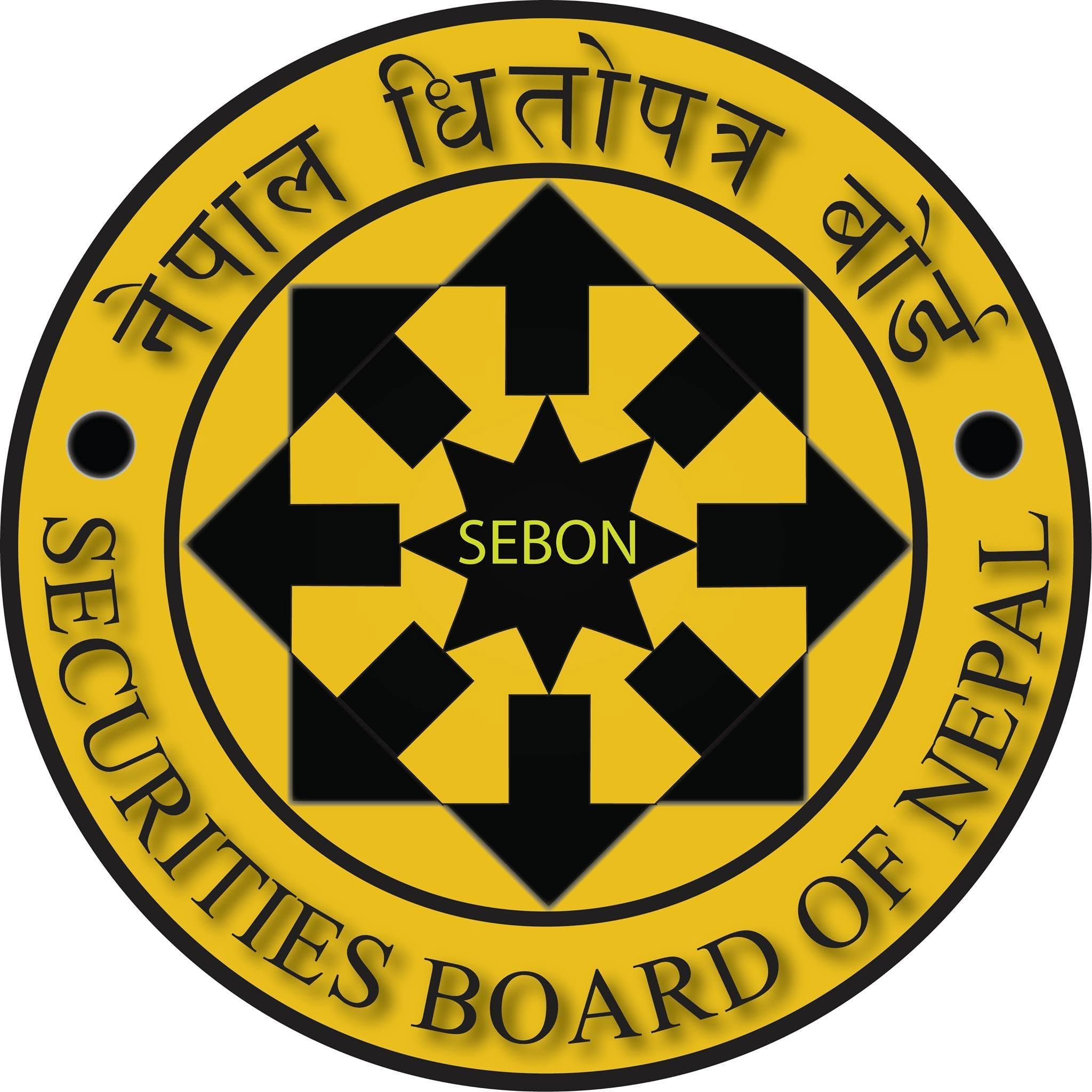
- {{{picture_caption}}}

Agency overview
- Formed: 7 June 1993; 33 years ago
- Type: Regulatory agency
- Headquarters: Lalitpur (Satdobato), Nepal
- Employees: 150+
- Agency executive: Dr. Gopal Prasad Bhatta, Chairperson
- Parent department: Ministry of Finance, Government of Nepal
- Key document: Securities Act, 2006
- Website: www.sebon.gov.np

Securities Board of Nepal (SEBON) (Nepali: नेपाल धितोपत्र बोर्ड) is the regulator of securities market in Nepal. It was established on June 7, 1993, after the first amendment in the Securities Exchange Act 1983. It follows the rules laid out in the Securities Act, 2006. The organization has four departments: Regulation, Supervision, Commodity Market and Research, and Management and Legal. These departments look after eight divisions, each responsible for different parts of the securities market. Within these divisions, there are twenty smaller sections.

SEBON gets its operation cost from the government, fees charged for transactions on the stock exchange, and fees for registering corporate securities. Other income comes from fees for registering and renewing stock exchanges and other market players, as well as money from its revolving fund.

== Merchant Bank ==
The Securities Board of Nepal (SEBON) regulates merchant banks under the Securities Businessperson (Merchant Banker) Regulations, 2064 (2008). These regulations define the scope, licensing, and operational standards for merchant banking activities. Nepal has 32 licensed merchant banks, with several more in the pipeline. Most are subsidiaries of commercial banks, though a few operate independently. The list of Merchant Banker (July 2025) licensed by SEBON are:

Merchant Bank	Parent Company	Headquarter	Website
Aakash Capital Limited	Aakash Group	Kathmandu (Thapathali)	link
Arks Capital Advisors Limited	-	Kathmandu (Central Business Park, Thapathali)	link
Asian Capital Limited	Asian Life Insurace	Kathmandu (Maitidevi Complex, Maitidevi)	link
Citizens Investment Trust	Citizen Investment Trust	Kathmandu (New Baneshwor)	link
Citizens Capital Limited	Citizens Bank	Kathmandu (Dillibazar)	link
Elite Merchant Capital Limited	-	Kathmandu (Lazimpat)	link
Garima Capital Limited	Garima Bikas Bank	Kathmandu (Hattishar)	link
Global IME Capital Limited	Global IME Bank	Kathmandu (Naxal)	link
Himalayan Securities Banker	Himalayan Reinsurance	Kathmandu (New Baneshwor)	link
Himalayan Capital Limited	Himalayan Bank	Kathmandu (IT Plaza, Kamaladi)	link
Himalayan Investment Banker	Himalayan Life Insurace	Kathmandu (New Baneshwor)	link
Jyoti Capital Limited	Jyoti Bikas Bank	Kathmandu (Kamalpokhari)	link
Kumari Capital Limited	Kumari Bank	Kathmandu (Nagpokhari)	link
Laxmi Sunrise Capital Limited	Laxmi Sunrise Bank	Kathmandu (New Baneshwor)	link
Machhapuchre Capital Limited	Machhapuchchhre Bank	Kathmandu (Sundhara)	link
Market Pundit Capital & Merchant Banking Ltd.	-	Lalitpur (Jawlakhel)	link
Muktinath Capital Limited	Muktinath Bikash Bank	Kathmandu (Kamaladi)	link
Nabil Investment bank Limited	Nabil Bank	Kathmandu (Central Plaza, Naxal)	link
National Capital Limited	-	Kathmandu (Panipokhari)	-
Nepal Life Capital Limited	Nepal Life Insurance	Kathmandu (Dillibazar)	link
Nepal SBI Merchant Banking Limited	Nepal SBI Bank	Kathmandu (Hattishar)	link
NIC ASIA Capital Limited	NIC ASIA Bank	Kathmandu (Babarmahal)	link
NIMB ACE Capital Limited	Nepal Investment Mega Bank	Kathmandu (Lazimpat)	link
NMB Capital Limited	NMB Bank	Kathmandu (Baluwatar)	link
Prabhu Capital Limited	Prabhu Bank	Kathmandu (Kamaladi)	link
Provident Merchant Banking Limited	-	Kathmandu (Sankhamul)	link
RBB Merchant Banking Limited	Rastriya Banijya Bank	Kathmandu (Teku)	link
Reliable Investment & Merchant Capital Limited	-	Kathmandu (Baluwatar)	link
Sampanna Capital and Advisory Nepal Ltd.	-	Lalitpur (Pulchowk)	link
Sanima Capital Limited	Sanima Bank	Kathmandu (Naxal)	link
Siddhartha Capital Limited	Siddhartha Bank	Kathmandu (Naxal)	link
Sunlife Capital Ltd.	Sun Nepal Life Insurance	Kathmandu (New Plaza, Putalisadak)	link

== See also ==
- Nepal Stock Exchange
