= Baneshwor, Kathmandu =

Baneshwor बानेश्वर
- Neighborhood in Kathmandu
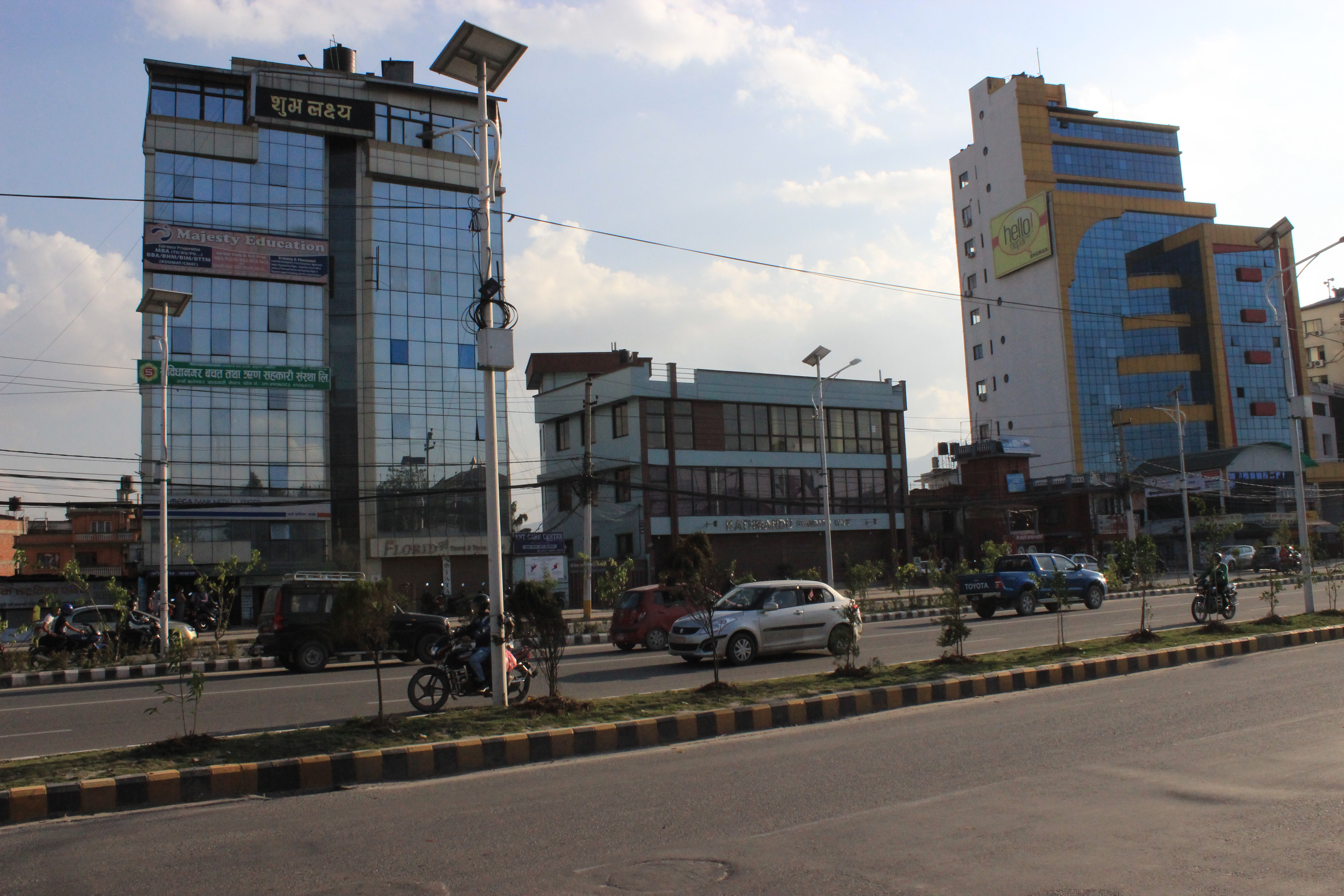
- Nicknames: Residential Hub of Kathmandu
- Location in Kathmandu
- Coordinates: 27.71453°N 85.31991°E
- Country: Nepal
- District: Kathmandu District
- Time zone: UTC+5:45 (Nepal Time)

Baneshwor (Nepali: बानेश्वर) is the largest residential area of Kathmandu, Nepal. The area is composed of New-Baneshwor, Mid-Baneshwor, and Old-Baneshwor, Baneshwor Height, Minbhawan, Shankhamul, Bhimsengola and Thapa Gaun. Major landmarks of Baneshwor include the International Convention Centre which used to host Federal Parliament of Nepal until September 2026. Maitighar Mandala is located at the southern border of the neighborhood. Baneshwor is the central hub of many businesses and opportunities in Kathmandu. It is regarded as the land of opportunities by Nepali people. The people in this area are often employed in private business or are in the corporate sector.

Baneshwor is a local financial and educational hub hosting several national banks and institutions. The following organizations have their headquarters in Baneshwor:

Name	Sector	Notes
Association of Youth Organizations Nepal	Non-Governmental	
KFA Private Limited	Non-Governmental	
Shree Ratna Rajya school	Governmental	Education
Apex College	Education	
Aryan School of Engineering & Management	Education	
College of Applied Food and Dairy Technology	Education	
Derivative and Commodity Exchange Nepal Ltd.	Finance	
Global College of Management	Education	
Eyeplex Mall	Shopping Complex & Multiplex	
Hits FM	Broadcasting	
Janata Bank Nepal Limited	Finance	
Uniglobe College	Education	
Liverpool International College	Education	
Manang Air	Aviation	
N. K. Singh Memorial English Preparatory School	Education	
Nepal Tribune Media	News	
Sadbhavana Party	Political Party	
Standard Chartered Nepal	Finance	
Thames International College	Education	
Goreto Educational Consultancy	Education	

== Banks ==
- Shangri-la Development Bank Limited
- Lumbini Bikas Bank Limited
- Janata Bank Nepal Limited
- Global IME Bank
- Himalayan Bank
- Nabil Bank
- Mega Bank Nepal Limited
- Machchhapuchhre Bank
- Prime Commercial Bank
- Century Bank
- Citizens Bank International
- Standard Chartered Nepal
- Kumari Bank
- NIC Asia Bank
- Nepal Bank Limited
- Bank of Kathmandu
- Everest Bank
- Laxmi Bank
- Nepal SBI Bank
- Nepal Investment Bank
- Civil Bank
- Agriculture Development Bank
- Kamana Sewa Bikas Bank
- Jyoti Bikash Bank
- Kailash Bikash Bank

== Transportation ==
Busses of Sajha Yatayat serve Baneshwor. Other private Bus companies also stop at several points in the neighborhood.
