= Commercial banks of Nepal =

Commercial banks are 'A' Class Financial Institutions in Nepal. Nepal Bank Limited is the first & oldest Commercial bank in Nepal established in 1937 AD with government and private investment.Commercial Bank mainly provide facilities to their customer like Deposits, Loans, Mobile Banking, Remittance.

Nepal Rastra Bank (NRB) is the central bank of Nepal and is responsible for the regulation and supervision of the commercial banks of nepal.As per prescribed by NRB commercial bank should have minimum capital of 8 billion.

== List of Commercial Banks (Class A) ==
1. Kumari Bank (After the merger with Nepal Credit and Commerce Bank)
2. Rastriya Banijya Bank
3. Agriculture Development Bank
4. Nabil Bank (After the acquisition of Nepal Bangladesh Bank)
5. Nepal Investment Mega Bank (After the merger with Mega Bank Nepal Limited)
6. Standard Chartered Bank Nepal
7. Himalayan Bank (After the merger with Civil Bank Limited)
8. Nepal SBI Bank
9. Everest Bank
10. Prabhu Bank (After the acquisition of Century Bank Limited)
11. Laxmi Sunrise Bank (After the merger with Sunrise Bank)
12. Global IME Bank Limited (After the merger with Bank of Kathmandu)
13. Citizens Bank International Limited
14. Prime Commercial Bank
15. NMB Bank Nepal
16. NIC Asia Bank
17. Siddhartha Bank
18. Sanima Bank
19. Machhapuchchhre Bank
20. Nepal Bank Limited

=== Merger And Acquisition of commercial banks ===
| Bank | Year | Fate |
|---|---|---|
| Bank of Asia and NIC Bank Limited | 2013 | Merged and operated as NIC Asia Bank Limited |
| Commerz & Trust Bank and Global IME Bank Limited | 2014 | Merged and operated as Global IME Bank Limited |
| KIST Bank Limited and Prabhu Bank Limited | 2014 | Merged and operated as Prabhu Bank Limited |
| Grand Bank Nepal and Prabhu Bank Limited | 2016 | Merged and operated as Prabhu Bank Limited |
| Lumbini Bank Limited and Bank of Kathmandu | 2016 | Merged and operated as Bank of Kathmandu Lumbini (later renamed to Bank of Kathmandu) |
| Janata Bank and Global IME Bank Limited | 2019 | Merged and operated as Global IME Bank Limited |
| Nepal Bangladesh Bank and Nabil Bank Limited | 2022 | Acquired by Nabil Bank Limited |
| Nepal Credit & Commerce Bank and Kumari Bank Limited | 2023 | Merged and operated as Kumari Bank Limited |
| Bank of Kathmandu and Global IME Bank Limited | 2023 | Merged and operated as Global IME Bank Limited |
| Century Commercial Bank and Prabhu Bank Limited | 2023 | Acquired by Prabhu Bank Limited |
| Mega Bank Nepal Limited and Nepal Investment Bank Limited | 2023 | Merged and operated as Nepal Investment Mega Bank |
| Civil Bank and Himalayan Bank Limited | 2023 | Acquired by Himalayan Bank Limited |
| Sunrise Bank Limited and Laxmi Bank Limited | 2023 | Merged and operated as Laxmi Sunrise Bank |
