= Durga Prasai =

Nepalese political activist

- दुर्गा प्रसाई
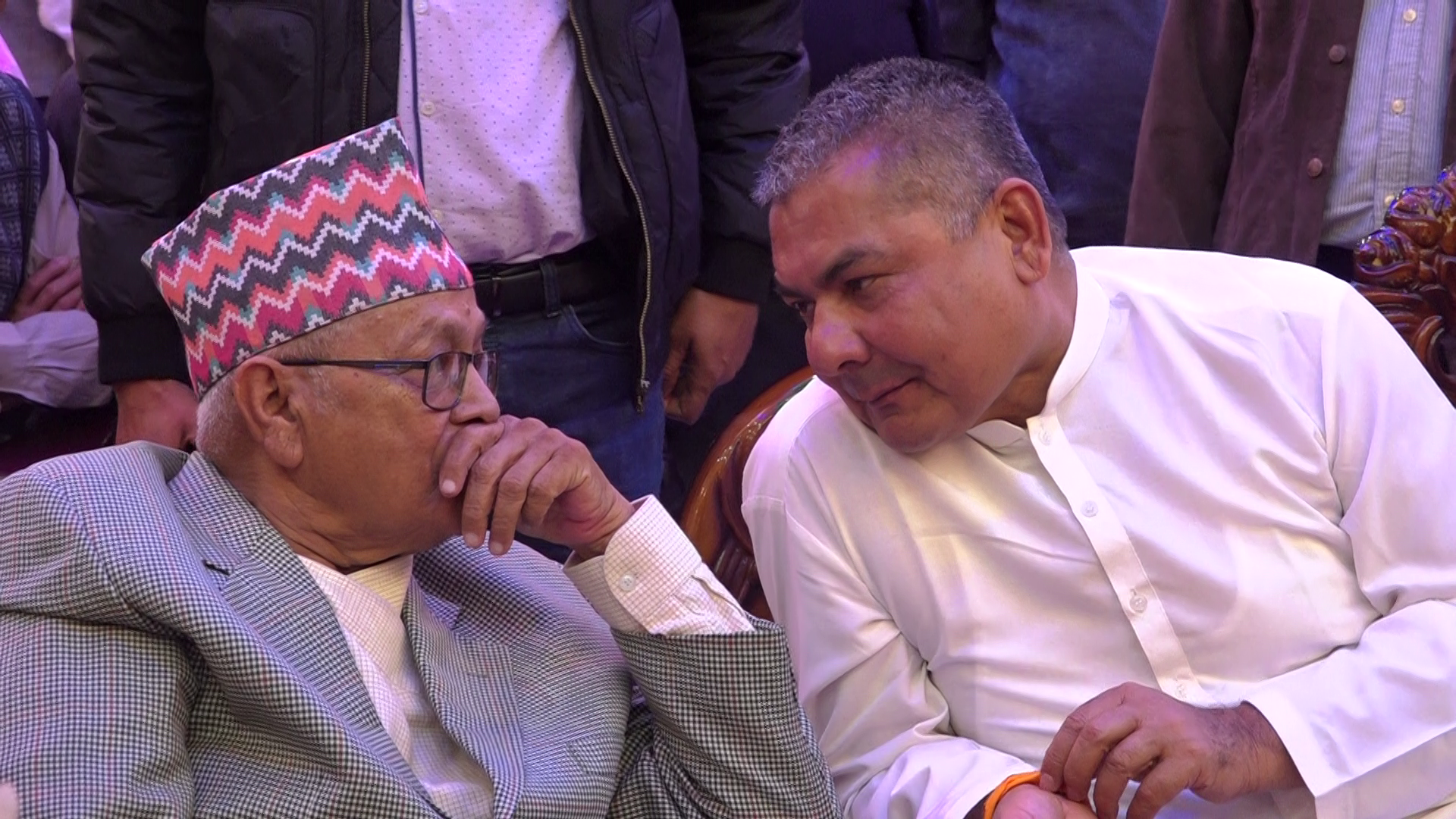
- Prasai in 2025 (right)
- Born: 5 May 1971 (age 55); Aathrai, Terhathum district, Kingdom of Nepal
- Occupation: Medical entrepreneur
- Years active: 2016–present
- Known for: Political, campaigning
- Children: 2
- Website: https://durgaprasai.org

Durga Prasai (Nepali: दुर्गा प्रसाई) is a Nepalese right-wing political activist, monarchist, medical entrepreneur and former Maoist guerrilla. Since 2023, he has been an advocate against the current federal democratic government system and calls for the reinstatement of the constitutional monarchy and Hindu state by amending the constitution of 2015.

He was previously charged for loan default worth NPR 5.57 billion lend by 8 different commercial banks of Nepal to establish the medical college B&C Hospital in Jhapa. According to Nepal Rastra Bank sources, Prasai owes NPR 760 million from Nabil Bank, NPR 1.2 billion from Prabhu Bank, NPR 1 billion from Kumari Bank (then NCC Bank), NPR 700 million from Rastriya Banijya Bank, 650 million from Nepal Investment Mega Bank (then Mega Bank), NPR 153 million from Lumbini Development Bank, NPR 110 million from Goodwill Finance and NPR 1 billion from Global IME Bank (then Janata Bank). Prasai stated that he would pay the dues once government grants the affiliation permission to his college.

He is currently serving as an executive director of B&C Hospital and a private investor of Taksha Shila education foundation, both located in Jhapa. In March 2024, Supreme Court of Nepal directed the Medical Education Commission and Kathmandu University with an issue order to mandates granting the medical affiliation permission to the Prasai B&C Hospital to run the MBBS classes after his writ petition to the court.

== Early life ==
His family moved to Jhapa after he was born in 1971 into a farming family in Terhathum. After Class 8, he left school because of financial difficulties. He entered politics as a result of a failed buffalo farming endeavor and growing debt, later went underground with the Maoists after first siding with the Nepali Congress. Prasai backed the Maoists during the Nepalese Civil War and even gave fighters sanctuary. Following then Maoist insurgency, he sided with Prachanda's Maoist Centre before joining KP Oli's Communist Party of Nepal (Unified Marxist–Leninist).

== Political career ==
In early 2017, an image circulated on social media of Durga Prasai dining alongside KP Sharma Oli and Pushpa Kamal Dahal, former Prime Ministers and leaders of Nepal's prominent communist parties. Prasai claims that this luncheon at his residence played a pivotal role in unifying CPN (UML) and CPN (Maoist Centre) to form a left alliance, which would later lead the government by securing 174 out of 275 seats in 2017 Nepalese general election. During the gathering, the trio was seen enjoying Jumli Marshi Rice, a type of Himalayan rice renowned for its cultivation in record altitudes, stimulating heightened demand for this rice variant in Nepali market. The meeting ultimately became instrumental in boosting Prasai's popularity.

Prasai, who was formerly sympathetic to the Maoists, and was later elected to represent the CPN UML in the October 2021 statute conference. After receiving a nomination for the central committee in December 2021, Prasai was given the position of deputy head of the party's industry, trade, and supply section but was expelled from the party in February 2023, after he publicly started making remarks in favor of monarchy, Hindu state and abolition of federalism.

According to Prasai, he has exposed numerous individuals, including bureaucrats, industrialists, and politicians, who exploit political power for personal gain and deplete the country's resources. While his claims have sparked significant public discourse and calls for greater accountability and transparency, they remain his personal assertions and have not been independently verified.

=== 2023 pro-monarchy protests ===
On November 23, 2023, he announced a political campaign in Kathmandu titled Nation, Nationality, Religion-Culture, and Citizen Rescue Campaign. Tens of thousands of protestors led by Prasai marched the streets for the Restoration of the constitutional monarchy abolishing the federalism and declaration of Nepal from secular to a Hindu state. Both of these were abolished in 2008.

In his political rallies, Prasai led group also demands either to cancel all private loans of general public above NPR 2 million taken from cooperative banking institutions or cut the bank's lending to 4 to 5 percent interest rate from 17 percent for the loan above NPR 2 million. He also demands for Loan restructuring making the provision of 15 years installments for bank loans and to nationalize all commercial banks and industries owned by Marwari people in Nepal. In March 2023 district administration offices were given noticed by the Nepal Ministry of Home Affairs (MoHA) to stop illicit activity directed towards banks and financial institutions (BFIs) created by the Durga Prasai nationwide campaign.

The planned events for Yuwa Sangh and Durga Prasai on November 23 was given a separate venue for demonstration by the District Administration Office of Kathmandu due to concerns over safety and security. However, on the day of demonstration, the two sides clashed, and police intervened to deter the crowds. On the second day of the demonstration, Prasai was kept in unofficial house arrest.

=== 2025 pro-monarchy protests ===
On March 28, 2025, a large pro-monarchy demonstration was held in Tinkune, Kathmandu, organised by a committee led by Navaraj Suvedi and supported by Durga Prasai and the Rastriya Prajatantra Party (RPP). The protest advocated for a Sanatan Hindu state, the restoration of constitutional monarchy, and the rollback of federalism.

The event turned violent, resulting in the deaths of two individuals, including a photojournalist. Nepal Police, citing the scale of the unrest, reported the use of 746 tear gas shells, 198 blank rounds, and two live pistol rounds in efforts to control the crowd.

Durga Prasai later clarified in a statement to the police, given in the presence of a government attorney, that the use of force—including teargas and gunfire—had already begun before his arrival at the protest venue, triggering chaos and dispersal. He emphasised that he had “no role whatsoever” in the violence, noting that the event was organised and led operationally by the Suvedi-led committee, and that his own participation was limited due to the situation on the ground.

Following the incident, the Ministry of Home Affairs announced intentions to pursue legal action against several individuals, including Prasai. However, Prasai maintained that his activities remained within constitutional bounds and denied any direct involvement in the escalation of violence. Several political parties and human rights organizations have since called for an impartial and high-level investigation to determine responsibility and ensure transparency in the judicial process.

== Legal issues and controversies ==
In July 2018, Prasai was accused of defamation after making public remarks implying that female Nepali students in Bangladesh were having affairs with their professors to obtain medical degrees. The National Human Rights Commission received a formal complaint against Prasai from Rajyalaxmi Shrestha, Jamuna Subedi, and Ambika Karki. The Libel and Slander Act, 2016 and the Some Public (Crime and Punishment) Act, 2027 were invoked to demand severe legal action against Prasai for making such a callous remark, much to the dismay of the parents and female Nepali students studying medicine in Bangladesh.

In 2020, a warrant was issued by Bhaktapur police for the arrest of Durga Prasai based on the defamation complaint filed by Shri Krishna Giri, vice-chairman of Medical Education Commission. Prasai had accused Giri of demanding NPR200 million to get approval of affiliation of B & C Medical College at Jhapa. Prasai, counter, filed a case against Giri at the Commission for Investigation of Abuse of Authority and the Department of Money Laundering investigation.

On 17 January 2023, Rastriya Swatantra Party MP Dhaka Kumar Shrestha audio tape was leaked where Shrestha was asking Durga Prasai NPR 20 to 30 million for a bribe. In the statement, Shrestha claims that Mohan Jung Thapa of the same party and his team asked for NPR 30 million, to make him the health minister in favor of which Shrestha tells Prasai that he would be helping for medical affiliation, once he become the minister. On April 9, 2023, RSP chairman Rabi Lamichhane expelled him from the party and later suspended from the Parliament.

In March 2024, a four-person committee led by the joint secretary of the ministry, established by the Ministry of Home Affairs look into the issuance and extension of a weapon permit to Durga Prasai under the firearms licensing policy of Nepal's Firearms and Ammunition Act 1962. On March 18, 2024, two of Prasai's personal assistants and support staffs Deepak Khadka and Raj Kumar Dhital, were taken into custody from the Supreme Court's grounds, armed with a semiautomatic rifle and one hundred ammunitions. They were eventually freed by a bench consisting of Nahakul Subedi and Sunil Kumar Pokharel.

He was arrested in September 2026.
