= List of banks in Nepal =

The Nepal Rastra Bank has licensed 103 BFIs as of mid-july 2026 and a development bank and 2 finance companies are declared problematic a& transactions are suspended. Among them, 50 are BFIs that conduct general banking, and 50 are microfinance institutions that serve deprived women in society by providing loans. This is a list of banks and financial institutions in Nepal licensed by the Nepal Rastra Bank and their branches/ extension counters.

== Class A: Commercial banks ==
Commercial banks are classified as Class "A" banks by the Nepal Rastra Bank. There are 20 commercial banks as of Mid July 2026.

Bank Name	Head Office	Paid-up capital in arab	Branches	Website
Agriculture Development Bank	Ramshahpath, Kathmandu	रु 19.74	310	
Citizens Bank	Narayanhitipath, Kathmandu	रु 15.51	210	
Everest Bank	Lazimpat, Kathmandu	रु 13.72	144	
Global IME Bank Limited	Kamaladi, Kathmandu	रु 38.12	429	
Himalayan Bank	Kamaladi, Kathmandu	रु 22.58	198	
Kumari Bank	Naxal, Kathmandu	रु 26.23	336	
Laxmi Sunrise Bank	Hattisar, Kathmandu	रु 26.78	294	
Machhapuchhre Bank	Lazimpat, Kathmandu	रु 12.09	177	
Nabil Bank	Teendhara, Kathmandu	रु 27.06	288	
Nepal Bank	Dharmapath, Kathmandu	रु 14.69	297	
Nepal Investment Mega Bank	Durbar Marg, Kathmandu	रु 34.13	328	
Nepal SBI Bank	Kamaladi, Kathmandu	रु 11.33	133	
NIC Asia Bank	Kamaladi, Kathmandu	रु 14.92	428	
NMB Bank Nepal	Babar Mahal, Kathmandu	रु 19.28	212	
Prabhu Bank	Anamnagar, Kathmandu	रु 23.54	374	
Prime Commercial Bank	Kamal Pokhari, Kathmandu	रु 20.95	195	
Rastriya Banijya Bank	Singha Durbar, Kathmandu	रु 15.64	384	
Sanima Bank	Narayanchaur, Kathmandu	रु 13.58	141	
Siddhartha Bank	Naxal, Kathmandu	रु 14.09	198	
Standard Chartered Bank	Naya Baneshwor, Kathmandu	रु 10.04	18	

== Class B: Development banks ==
Nepal Rastra Bank has licensed 17 development banks and has classified these on national and province level as per working area. There are 8 national level and 8 are regional ie province/district level development banks operational as of July 2026 & 1 development bank is declared problematic. The list of National Level Development Banks are.

Company Name	Headquarters/ Corporate Office	Paid-up capital (In arab)	Branches	Website
Garima Bikas Bank	Lazimpat, Kathmandu	रु 6.02	137	
Jyoti Bikas Bank	Kamaladi, Kathmandu	रु 4.40	119	
Kamana Sewa Bikas Bank	Gyaneshwor, Kathmandu	रु 3.86	124	
Lumbini Bikas Bank	Dillibazaar, Kathmandu	रु 3.62	91	
Mahalaxmi Development Bank	Durbar Marg, Kathmandu	रु 4.30	100	
Muktinath Bikash Bank	Kamaladi, Kathmandu	रु 8.00	189	
Sangrila Development Bank	Baluwatar, Kathmandu	रु 3.56	109	
Shine Resunga Development Bank	Kalikanagar, Butwal	रु 4.88	88	

The list of regional (Province/District) Level development banks are.

Bank Name	Headquarters/ Corporate Office	Working Area	Paid-up capital(In crore)	Branches & Extension Counters	Website
Corporate Development Bank	Adarsanagar, Birgunj	Madhesh Province	रु 53	5	
Excel Development Bank	Mukti Chowk, Birtamode	Koshi Pradesh	रु 125	48	
Green Development Bank	Sabhagriha Chowk, Pokhara	Gandaki Province	रु 61	15	
Miteri Development Bank	Mahendra Path, Dharan	Koshi Pradesh	रु 122	18	
Narayani Development Bank	Ratnanagar, Chitwan	Chitwan District	रु 49	5	
Salapa Bikash Bank	Diktel Bazar, Khotang	Khotang District	रु 52	6	
Saptakoshi Development Bank	Main Road, Biratnagar	Koshi Pradesh	रु 83	34	
Sindhu Bikas Bank	Banepa, Kavrepalanchowk	Bagmati Pradesh	रु 56	27	

=== Problematic Development Bank ===
- Karnali Development Bank.

=== Defunct Development Banks (National) ===
Bank	Closed	Fate
Supreme Development Bank	2017	Merged with NCC Bank Nepal
Reliable Development Bank	2017	Acquired by Global IME Bank
Siddhartha Development Bank	2017	Acquired by Janata Bank Nepal Limited
Ace Development Bank	2017	Acquired by Nepal Investment Bank Limited
Tourism Development Bank	2018	Merged with Mega Bank Nepal
NIDC Development Bank	2018	Acquired by Rastriya Banijya Bank
Om Development Bank	2019	Merged with NMB Bank
Kailash Bikash Bank	2020	Merged with Prime Commercial Bank
Deva Development Bank	2020	Acquired by Kumari Bank
Gandaki Bikash Bank	2020	Merged with Mega Bank Nepal

== Class C: Finance Companies ==
Nepal Rastra Bank has licensed 16 finance companies as of mid July 2026. Among them 2 finance companies are problematic and 14 are operational.

Company Name	Headquarters/ Corporate Office	Paid-up capital (In Crore)	Branches	Website
Best Finance	Chabahil, Kathmandu	रु 89	19	
Central Finance	Kupondole, Lalitpur	रु 95	20	
Gurkhas Finance	Dillibazar, Kathmandu	रु 87	27	
Goodwill Finance	Hattisar, Kathmandu	रु 95	19	
Guheshwori Merchant Banking & Finance	Pulchowk, Lalitpur	रु 101	27	
ICFC Finance	Bhatbhateni, Kathmandu	रु 118	21	
Janaki Finance	Station Road, Janakpur	रु 69	5	
Manjushree Finance	Nayabaneshwor, Kathmandu	रु 135	29	
Multipurpose Finance	Bidhyapati Chowk, Janakpur	रु 61	10	
Nepal Finance	Kamaladi, Kathmandu	रु 78	13	
Pokhara Finance	Kamaladi, Kathmandu	रु 190	38	
Progressive Finance	New Road, Kathmandu	रु 85	28	
Reliance Finance	Pradarsani Marg, Kathmandu	रु 112	22	
Shree Investment & Finance	Dillibazar, Kathmandu	रु 100	13	

=== Problematic Finance Companies ===
- Nepal Share Markets & Finance company
- Capital Merchant Banking & Finance Company

== Class D: Micro Finance Financial Institutions ==
Microfinance financial institutions are classified as Class "D" banks by the Nepal Rastra Bank. There are 50 microfinance companies as of march 2026. Microfinance in Nepal are divided as retail and wholesale institutions. Retail microfinance provide services to individual institutions whereas wholesale microfinance provides services to retail microfinances and cooperatives. The list of wholesale microfinances are.

Company Name	Headquarter/ Corporate Office Area	Paid-up capital In Crores	Branches	Website
First Microfinance Laghubitta	Gyaneswar, Kathmandu	रु 134	3	
RSDC Laghubitta	Rupandehi, Butwal	रु 103	4	
Sana Kisan Bikas Laghubitta	Babarmahal, Kathmandu	रु 493	13	

There are 47 retail microfinance licensed by NRB. Retail microfinance are further sub divided in national and regional (province/district) level. The list of national level retail microfinance and their details are.

Company Name	Headquarter/ Corporate Office	Paid-up capital In Crores	Branches	Website
Aviyan Laghubitta	Panauti, Kavrepalanchowk	रु 25	61	
Aarambha Chautari Laghubitta	Banepa, Kavrepalanchowk	रु 37	136	
Asha Laghubitta	Madanpur, Nuwakot	रु 80	133	
Chhimek Laghubitta	Mid-Baneshwor, Kathmandu	रु 362	205	
CYC Nepal Laghubitta	Pokhara, Kaski	रु 27	125	
Deprosc Laghubitta	Bharatpur, Chitwan	रु 206	161	
Dhaulagiri Laghubitta	Baglung bazar, Baglung	रु 13	59	
Forward Laghubitta	Duhabi, Sunsari	रु 120	161	
Ganapati Laghubitta	Suklagandaki, Tanahu	रु 15	44	
Global IME Laghubitta	Pokhara, Kaski	रु 62	126	
Grameen Bikas Laghubitta	Butwal, Rupandehi	रु 100	197	
Himalayan Laghubitta	Chabahil, Kathmandu	रु 32	76	
Infinity Laghubitta	Gaidakot, Nawalparasi	रु 50	104	
Jeevan Bikas Laghubitta	Katahari Morang	रु 154	165	
Janautthan Samudayik Laghubitta	Butwal, Rupandehi	रु 17	40	
Kalika Laghubitta	Pokhara, Kaski	रु 41	110	
Laxmi Laghubitta	Maharajgung, Kathmandu	रु 44	96	
Mahila Laghubitta	Banepa, Kavrepalanchowk	रु 22	85	
Mahuli Laghubitta	Bakdhuwa, Saptari	रु 37	66	
Manushi Laghubitta	Banepa, Kavrepalanchowk	रु 11	37	
Matribhumi Laghubitta	Budanilkantha, Kathmandu	रु 63	210	
Mero Microfinance Laghubitta	Battar, Nuwakot	रु 143	151	
NADEP Laghubitta	Gajuri, Dhading	रु 49	98	
National Laghubitta	Nilkantha, Dhading	रु 133	187	
Nerude Mirmire Laghubitta	Banepa, Kavrepalanchowk	रु 140	233	
NESDO Samridda Laghubitta	Kushma, Parbat	रु 29	61	
NIC Asia Laghubitta	Banepa, Kavrepalanchowk	रु 174	296	
Nirdhan Uthhan Laghubitta	Naxal, Kathmandu	रु 261	196	
NMB Laghubitta	Pokhara, Kaski	रु 72	156	
Sampada Laghubitta	Gaidakot, Nawalparasi	रु 79	157	
Samata Garelu Laghubitta	Banepa, Kavrepalanchowk	रु 63	92	
Samudayik Laghubitta	Banepa, Kavrepalanchowk	रु 17	45	
Shrinjansil Laghubitta	Golbazar, Siraha	रु 11	34	
Suryodaya Womi Laghubitta	Banepa, Kavrepalanchowk	रु 79	169	
Swabalamban Laghubitta	Kamalpokhari, Kathmandu	रु 166	155	
Sworojgar Laghubitta	Banepa, Kavrepalanchowk	रु 79	113	
Unique Nepal Laghubitta	Kohalpur, Banke	रु 15	42	
Unnati Sahakarya Laghubitta	Siddharthanagar, Rupandehi	रु 25	84	
Vijaya Laghubitta	Gaidakot, Nawalparasi	रु 79	136	

The list of regional (Province/District) Level microfinance are.

Bank Name	Headquarters/ Corporate Office	Working Area	Paid-up capital(In crore)	Branches & Extension Counters	Website
Aatmanirbhar Laghubitta	Ghorahi, Dang	Lumbini Province	रु 9	22	
Gurans Laghubitta	Dhankutabazar, Dhankuta	Koshi Province	रु 13	38	
Mithila Laghubitta	Dhalkebar, Dhanusha	Madhesh Province	रु 25	45	
Sanjeevani Laghubitta	Tulsipur, Dang	Lumbini Province	रु 81	19	
Support Laghubitta	Itahari, Sunsari	Koshi Province	रु 13	29	
Swabhiman Laghubitta	Tillottama, Rupandehi	Lumbini Province	रु 15	37	
Swastik Laghubitta	Lahan, Siraha	Madhesh Province	रु 5	13	
Upakar Laghubitta	Kohalpur, Banke	Lumbini Province	रु 11	39	

== Infrastructure Development Bank ==
Infrastructure Development Bank is non-classified Financial Institution licensed by Nepal Rastra Bank. There is one BFI as of January 2024.

- Nepal Infrastructure Bank Limited

== Others ==
=== Limited banking cooperatives ===
- National Cooperative Bank Limited

=== Hire Purchase ===
- Omni Hire Purchase Pvt.Ltd.
- Hulas FinServe Hire Purchase Ltd.
- Sipradi Hire Purchase Pvt. Ltd.
- M.A.W. Hire Purchase Pvt. Ltd.
- Batas Hire Purchase Pvt. Ltd.
- Syakar Hire Purchase Pvt. Ltd.
- Jagadamba Hire Purchase Pvt. Ltd.
- Venture Hire Purchase Pvt. Ltd.
- Manokamana Hire Purchase Pvt. Ltd.
- Agni Hire Purchase Pvt. Ltd.

=== Representative Offices ===
- Mashreq Bank PSC, Dubai , UAE
- Doha Bank, Doha , Qatar
- ICICI Bank Limited, Mumbai, India

=== Hydropower Investment and Development ===
- Hydroelectricity Investment and Development Company Limited (HIDCL)
