= Century Commercial Bank Limited =

Former commercial bank in Nepal

Century Commercial Bank Limited सेञ्चुरी कमर्सियल बैंक लिमिटेड
- Type: Public
- Traded as: NEPSE: CCBL
- Industry: Banking
- Founded: 23 January 2011; 15 years ago
- Defunct: 2023; 3 years ago
- Fate: Acquired by Prabhu Bank
- Headquarters: Putalisadak, Kathmandu
- Number of locations: 160 Branches
- Area served: Nepal
- Key people: Mr. Rajesh Kumar Shrestha (Chairman), Mr. Manoj Neupane (CEO) (Pre-acquisition)
- Products: Loans, Credit cards, Savings, Investment, consumer banking, corporate banking, finance and insurance, investment banking,
- Number of employees: 995
- Footnotes; Currently closed after acquisition by Prabhu Bank

Century Commercial Bank Limited was a commercial bank in Nepal. The bank was an 'A' class commercial bank licensed by Nepal Rastra Bank and had branches all across the nation with its head office in Kathmandu which provided entire commercial banking services. The bank was acquired by Prabhu bank Limited in January 2023.

The bank's shares were publicly traded as an 'A' category company in the Nepal Stock Exchange.

Before acquisition by Prabhu Bank Limited, the Bank had a network of 132 branches, 10 extension counters, 22 branchless banking and 92 ATMs across the country and offered a wide range of banking products in deposits, lending and other value added services such as internet/ mobile banking, remittance and branchless banking etc. The Bank's team consisted of more than 950 staffs and catered to more than 500,000 customers.

== Correspondent Network ==
After the acquisition by Prabhu bank in January 2023 all services are transferred, and the transactions are performed with the name of Prabhu Bank Limited. The bank had harmonious correspondent relationships with various international banks from various countries to facilitate trade, remittance and other cross border services.

== See also ==
- list of banks in Nepal
- Commercial Banks of Nepal
