= Durbar Marg =

Neighborhood of Kathmandu, Nepal

Durbarmarg दरबारमार्ग
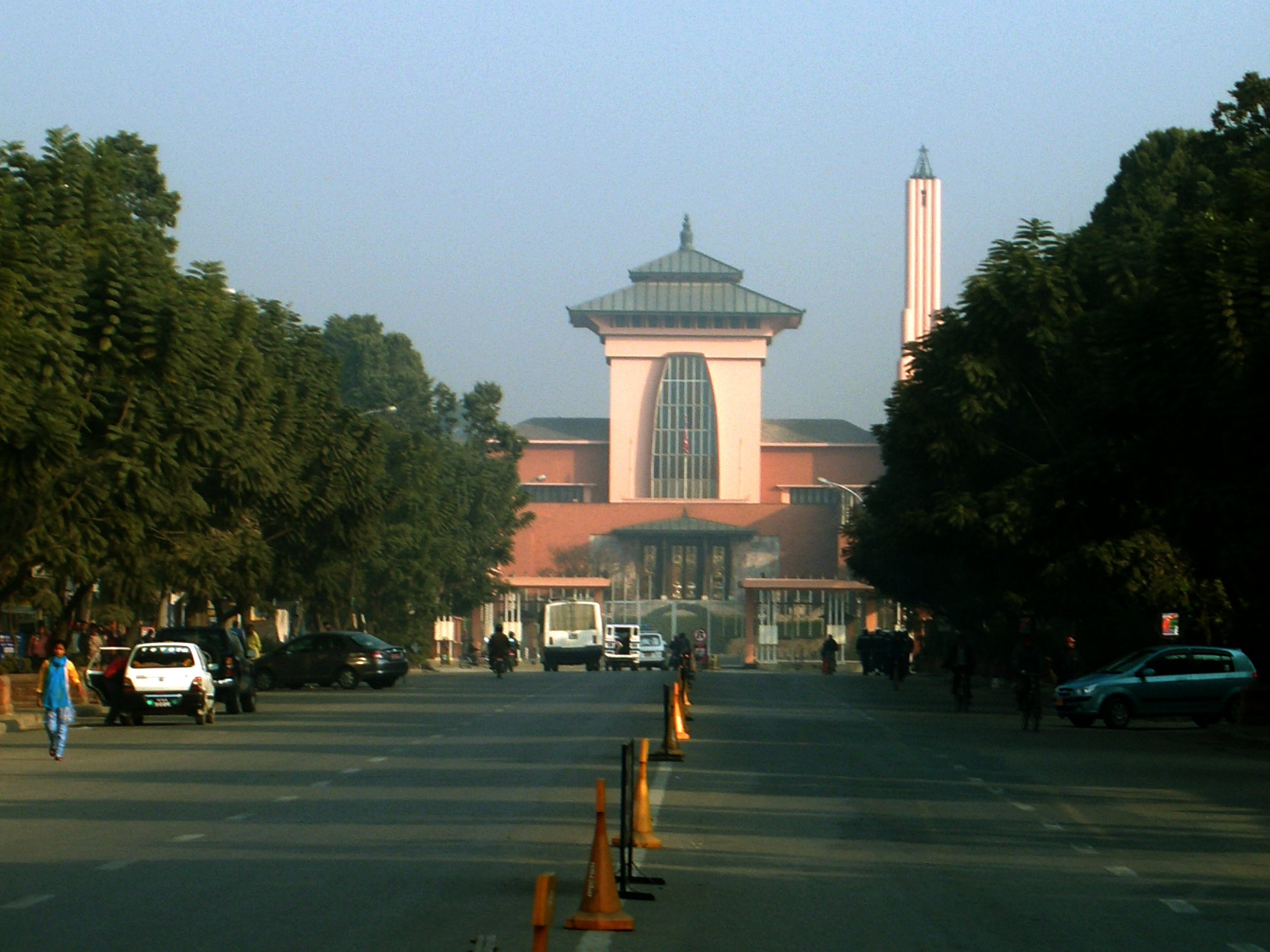
- Durbarmarg with Narayanhiti Palace visible in background.
- Interactive map of Durbarmarg दरबारमार्ग
- Native name: दरबारमार्ग (Nepali)
- Addresses: Kathmandu, Nepal
- Postal code: 44600
- Coordinates: 27°42′45.40″N 85°19′4.70″E

Durbar Marg or Durbarmarg (Nepali: दरबारमार्ग; informally known as King's Way) is a broad, long avenue in Nepal'si capital, Kathmandu. It is often considered the heart of the city, akin to the Champs Elysées and the main avenues of many capitals. As it leads to the Royal Palace of Narayanhiti, foreigner's also call it the King's Way, with Durbar meaning, as in the Moghul Empire, a royal gathering or court. It is a major tourist draw, vying with Thamel. It is flanked by luxury hotels (e.g. Hotel Del' Annapurna), restaurants serving international cuisine, global shopping brand outlets in refined centres including expensive boutiques, travel agencies, a couple of embassies, commercial banking headquarters, and premium real estate such as international airline offices.

== Location/History ==
A statue of King Mahendra, father of King Birendra stands in the center of the roundabout at the junction of Durbar Marg with Jamal maintained by Hotel Del' Annapurna. The ancient settlement of Jamal was a victim of the Ranas' enthusiasm for building. The rulers seized land from farmers and monasteries, demolishing an old bahal to make way for the new road. The bahal, one time abode of the 'White (Sveta) Matsyendranath', stood where a god image had been found in a field, an event commemorated every year at the Jana Baha Dyah Jatra. Sveta Matsyendranath chariot is assembled and driven three times round the spot over which the statue of King Mahendra now presides. Also on Durbar Marg, the greater part of which was built during the Rana era, are the campus of Tri-Chandra College and a mosque used by the valley's Muslim minority.

The Narayanhiti Royal Palace was turned into a public museum in 2008, after Nepal was declared a republic and construction in the area has increased since then. Durbar Marg is a central junction for the road connecting Lazimpat and Thamel, Bhat-Bhateni and Baluwatar, New Road and Asan, and Putali Sadak and Kamaladi. A green belt has been created along the roadside. The Narayanhiti Palace Museum, luxury hotels, shopping malls, nightclubs, pubs and branded stores are located on or near Durbar Marg.

== Restaurants ==
- Hard Rock Cafe
- Nanglo Bakery Cafe and HotBread
- Italian Pizza and Ice Cream
- Wimpys Kings Burger Pvt. Ltd.
- KFC
- Pizza Hut
- Trisara
- Regal Flavors Restro & Bar

== Banks and offices ==
- Kumari Bank Limited
- Nepal Investment Mega Bank
- State Bank of India - Nepal (SBI)
- Nabil Bank
- Thai Airways
- Qatar Airways
- Baleno
- Mega Bank Nepal Limited
- Manakamana Network Communication
- Citizens Bank International Limited

== Shopping centers and shopping stores ==
- Sherpa Mall
- Square Mall
- Woodland Complex
- Adidas, Reebok, Puma, Nike, U.S. Polo Assn., Arrow .
- Eighteen shop, Big Apple, Bentley.
- Brand stores: Zara, Benetton, Levi's, Swarovski, Cartier, etc.
- EvoStore: Apple, Bose, JBL, Incase, Speck

== Art galleries and furniture ==
- Curio Concern
- The Curio Gallery
- Melange Home Incentives
- Antique House of Khanal & Sons
- Archies Gallery, Durbarmarg

== Clubs and bars ==
- Club Platinum
- Club Ozone
