= Sanima Bank =

Nepalese Commercial Bank

Sanima Bank Limited सानिमा बैंक लिमिटेड
- Trade name: SANIMA
- Type: Public
- Traded as: NEPSE: SANIMA
- Industry: Banking, financial services
- Founded: 6 December 2004; 21 years ago
- Headquarters: Alakapuri, Naxal, Kathmandu, Nepal
- Number of locations: 105 Branches
- Area served: Nepal
- Key people: Mr. Tuk Prasad Poudel (Chairman); Pawan Kumar Acharya (CEO)
- Products: Banking Consumer banking, corporate banking, savings, securities
- Net income: ▲ रू257 crore (US$17 million) (2024)
- Number of employees: 1113 (2021)
- Subsidiaries: Sanima Capital Limited
- Rating: A−
- Website: www.sanimabank.com

Sanima Bank started its operation in 2004 as a National Level Development Bank. Sanima was licensed to operate by the Nepal Rastra Bank to function as an "A" Class Commercial Bank in 2012. Sanima has 106 full-fledged branches and 28 extension counters within and outside the Kathmandu Valley.

Sanima Bank has grown into one of Nepal's notable private commercial banks, backed by strong NRN promoters and a steadily expanding financial footprint. Over the years, the bank has broadened its presence across all major provinces, offering retail, corporate, digital, and remittance services. Its branch network and service counters are designed to reach underserved communities while maintaining strong operations in urban areas including Kathmandu, Pokhara, Biratnagar, and Nepalgunj.

Sanima Bank has also invested heavily in digital banking, offering mobile banking, QR-based payments, digital wallets, internet banking services, and advanced transaction security measures. It provides a "5-in-1" account that integrates a bank account, Demat, MeroShare, C-ASBA, and a trading account, allowing customers to complete banking and investment processes through a unified platform.

Financially, the bank has recorded stable growth in profit, deposits, and loans over the last several fiscal years. In FY 2081/82, Sanima Bank reported significant improvements in profitability, capital adequacy, and liquidity ratios. Deposits surpassed NPR 220 billion while loans exceeded NPR 176 billion, reflecting the bank's expanding credit portfolio. Its non-performing loan (NPL) ratio has generally remained below the national average, demonstrating cautious lending and strong risk-management practices.

Sanima Bank has introduced a wide variety of deposit schemes, including savings products, remittance-linked accounts, and multiple fixed deposit options with competitive interest rates. As of 2024–25, fixed deposit rates range from 2.80% to 6% depending on tenure, with remittance-linked deposits receiving higher benefits. In November 2025, the bank announced savings deposit rates of up to 4.28% per month for selected products, further strengthening its retail deposit base.

Sanima's promoter group includes influential NRNs whose global exposure has shaped the bank's governance and expansion strategies. The bank maintains a diversified loan portfolio in sectors such as Hydropower, SMEs, Agriculture, Housing, and corporate finance. Its capital adequacy and liquidity positions comply with Nepal Rastra Bank's regulatory framework, allowing the bank to maintain sustainable growth while expanding its digital and physical presence across Nepal.

== Ownership structure ==
The Bank currently has a paid-up capital of Nepalese Rupees 13.58 Billion (as of FY 2022/23). It is widely held with a mix of promoter and general public shares, and has maintained a stable shareholder base over the years. The governance model includes a board of directors with representation from both NRN investors and domestic stakeholders, ensuring balanced oversight.

- Promoter Group - 51.00%
- General Public - 49.00%

== Subsidiaries ==
Sanima Bank has developed a network of subsidiaries to support its diversified financial services. These subsidiaries provide capital market services, investment advisory, and securities trading for both retail and institutional clients.

- Sanima Capital Limited. This subsidiary focuses on capital market operations, underwriting, investment management, and financial advisory services.
- Sanima Securities Limited. Provides securities brokerage, online trading platforms, and research services for equity and debt markets.

== See also ==
Sanima Bank is part of the broader financial ecosystem in Nepal, interacting with regulatory institutions and industry associations. For further reading, consider the following:

- List of banks in Nepal
- Commercial Banks of Nepal
- Economy of Nepal
- Nepal Stock Exchange
