= Prime Commercial Bank =

Nepalese commercial bank

Prime Commercial Bank Limited प्राइम कमर्सियल बैंक लिमिटेड
- Type: Public
- Traded as: NEPSE: 357
- Industry: Banking
- Founded: 24 September 2007; 18 years ago
- Headquarters: Kamalpokhari, Kathmandu
- Number of locations: 192 Branches
- Area served: Nepal
- Key people: Mr. Rajendra Das Shrestha (chairman); Mr. Sanjeev Manandhar (CEO)
- Products: Loans, credit cards, savings, investment, merchant banking
- Number of employees: 1548
- Website: www.primebank.com.np

Prime Commercial Bank Limited is a commercial bank in Nepal. The bank is an 'A' class commercial bank licensed by Nepal Rastra Bank and has branches all across the nation with its head office in Kathmandu which provides entire commercial banking services.Prime Commercial Bank acquired Kailash Bikas Bank in a merger that was finalized on February 29, 2020 (29th Falgun, 2076).

The bank's shares are publicly traded as an 'A' category company in the Nepal Stock Exchange.

The bank donated रू 30,000,000 to the Prime Minister's Natural Disaster Relief Fund in August 2026 following the 2026 Nepal floods.

== See also ==
- List of banks in Nepal
- Commercial Banks of Nepal
