= Nepal Bangladesh Bank =

Nepal Bangladesh Bank Ltd.
- Company type: Public
- Traded as: NEPSE: NBB
- Industry: Banking
- Founded: June 1994
- Headquarters: Kamladi, Kathmandu, Nepal
- Area served: Nepal, Bangladesh
- Key people: A.R.M Nazmus Sakib (Chairman) M Shah Alam Sarwar (Director)
- Website: www.nbbl.com.np

Nepal Bangladesh Bank Ltd. (Nepali: नेपाल बाङ्लादेश बैंक) also known as NBB (Nepali: एन.बी.बी.) or NB Bank was a public owned commercial bank in Nepal. It was established in June 1994 with an authorized capital of Rs. 240 million and paid up capital of Rs. 60 million as a joint venture Bank with IFIC Bank of Bangladesh. The Nabil Bank Ltd. successfully acquired Nepal Bangladesh Bank Ltd. hence starting a joint venture from 11 July 2022. The bank will further operate in the name of Nabil Bank Limited.

Its head office was at Kamaladi-28, Kathmandu. It had a network of 111 branches, 8 Extension Counters, 5 Branchless banking, and 87 ATM terminals. It also provides e-banking and mobile banking services.
