= Civil Bank =

Commercial bank in Nepal

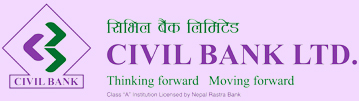
- Company type: Public
- Traded as: NEPSE: CBL
- Industry: Banking
- Founded: November 26, 2010
- Headquarters: Sundhara Kathmandu
- Number of locations: 127
- Area served: Nepal
- Key people: Pratap Jung Pandey Chairman Sunil Kumar Pokharel CEO
- Products: Loans, Credit cards, Savings, Investment, Merchant banking
- Number of employees: 1500+
- Subsidiaries: Civil Capital Market Ltd.
- Website: civilbank.com.np
- Footnotes / references Currently closed after acquisition by Himalayan Bank

Civil Bank Limited (CiBL) (Nepali: सिभिल बैंक लिमिटेड; NEPSE: CBL) is a commercial bank in Nepal. Founded in 2010, the bank is an 'A' class commercial bank licensed by Nepal Rastra Bank and has branches all across the nation with its head office in Kathmandu which provides entire commercial banking services.

The bank was established with a paid up capital of NPR 1.20 billion later raised to 2.00 billion by issuing ordinary shares. The paid up capital of the bank has since been increased to NPR 2.69 billion after distribution of stock dividends and successful acquisition of former Axis Development Bank Limited and Civil Merchant Bittiya Sanstha Limited. The bank is under process of raising paid-up capital to 4.70 billion by acquiring International Leasing and Finance Company Limited. The bank's shares are publicly traded as an 'A' category company in the Nepal Stock Exchange.

== See also ==
- List of banks in Nepal
- Commercial Banks of Nepal
