= Siddhartha Bank =

Nepalese commercial bank

- Type: Public
- Traded as: NEPSE: 145
- Industry: Banking, financial services
- Founded: 2002
- Headquarters: Naxal, Kathmandu
- Number of locations: 197 Branches
- Area served: Nepal
- Key people: Mr. Rahul Agrawal (chairman); Mr. Rameshwar Prasad Bashyal (CEO)
- Products: Loans, Credit cards, Savings, Investment, Merchant banking
- Net income: ▲ रू339 crore (US$22 million) (2024)
- Number of employees: 2000+
- Subsidiaries: Siddhartha Capital Ltd.
- Rating: BBB+
- Website: siddharthabank.com

Siddhartha Bank Limited (SBL) is one of the largest private commercial bank in Nepal. It is the 18th commercial bank to be licensed by Nepal Rastra Bank. It started operation in Dec 2002, and has 196 branches and 226 ATMs all across the nation with its head office in Kathmandu which provides entire commercial banking services and remittance services.

Siddhartha bank is also the official title sponsor of Nepal Premier League for five-year period from 2024 to 2028.

The bank's shares are publicly traded as an 'A' category company in the Nepal Stock Exchange.

Siddhartha Bank Limited has received several awards and recognitions for its performance and contribution to the banking industry in Nepal. It has been awarded as the 'Bank of the Year' by The Banker, a leading financial magazine, and has also been recognized by various organizations for its contribution to the economy and society.

== Correspondent Network ==
The bank has been maintaining correspondent relationships with various international banks from various countries to facilitate trade, remittance and other cross-border services. Through these correspondent, the bank is able to provide services in any major currencies in the world.

== SBL Remit ==
SBL Remit is also a popular remittance company in Nepal. SBL Remit is a product of Siddhartha Bank Limited (SBL), one of the commercial banks in Nepal. It offers various remittance services to its customers, including online remittance, bank deposit, and cash pickup. SBL Remit has tie-ups with various banks and financial institutions in Nepal and has a presence in countries such as the United States, Australia, the United Kingdom, and the Gulf countries.

== Ownership structure ==
The Bank currently has a paid-up capital of 14.09 billion Nepalese rupees (as of FY 2023/24).

- Promoter Group - 51.00%
- General Public - 49.00%

== Subsidiaries ==
The bank's subsidiaries are as follows:

- Siddhartha Capital Limited.

== See also ==
- List of banks in Nepal
- Commercial Banks of Nepal
