= Laxmi Sunrise Bank =

Nepalese commercial bank

- Company type: Public
- Traded as: NEPSE: 359
- Industry: commercial banking industry
- Founded: 3 April 2002
- Headquarters: Hattisar, Kathmandu, Nepal
- Area served: Nepal
- Key people: Mr. Raman Nepal (chairman); Mr. Ajay Bikram Shah (CEO)
- Products: Financial services and wealth management
- Website: www.laxmisunrise.com

Laxmi Sunrise Bank Limited is a commercial bank in Nepal. The bank is an 'A' class commercial bank licensed by Nepal Rastra Bank and has branches across the nation with its head office in Kathmandu. The bank's shares are publicly traded on the Nepal Stock Exchange.

The bank was formed with a merger between Laxmi Bank Limited and Sunrise Bank Limited. It started joint operations on July 14, 2023, and was eventually renamed Laxmi Sunrise Bank Limited.

== Ownership structure ==
The Bank currently has a paid-up capital of 26.78 billion Nepalese rupees (as of FY 2025/26).

- Promoter Group - 51%
- General Public - 49%

== Subsidiaries ==
The bank's subsidiaries are as follows:

- LS Capital Limited.
- Sunrise Securities Limited.
- Laxmi Laghubitta Bittiya Sanstha Limited.

== See also ==
- List of banks in Nepal
- Commercial Banks of Nepal
