= IFIC Bank =

Bangladeshi private commercial bank

IFIC Bank PLC.

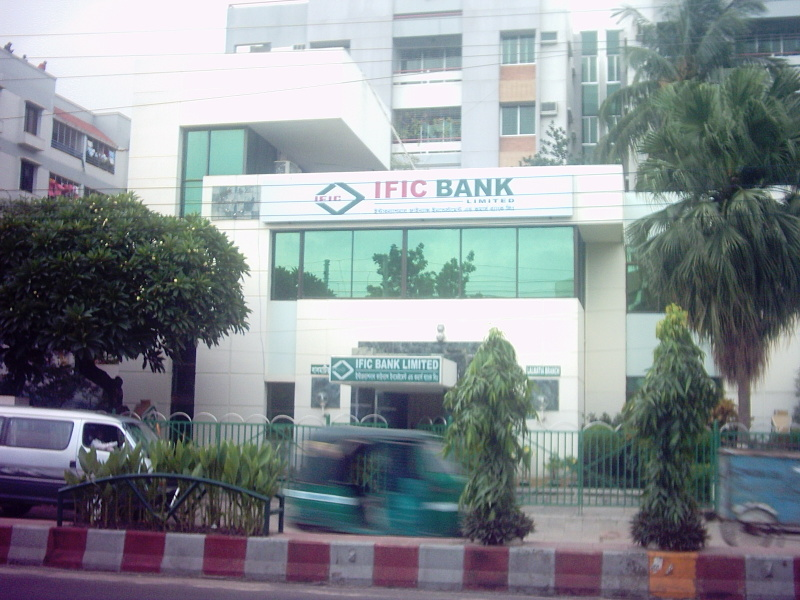
- IFIC Tower, 61, Purana paltan, Dhaka-1000
- Type: Limited Liability Company
- Traded as: DSE: IFIC
- Industry: Banking
- Founded: Dhaka, Bangladesh (1976)
- Headquarters: Dhaka, Bangladesh
- Products: Banking services; Consumer banking; Corporate banking; Investment banking
- Operating income: ▲BDT in Mln 8,424 (2020)
- Net income: ▲BDT in Mln 2,864 (2020)
- Total assets: ▲BDT in Billion 363 (2020)
- Website: www.ificbank.com.bd

The International Finance Investment and Commerce Bank PLC. commonly known as IFIC Bank is a first generation Bangladeshi private commercial bank. IFIC Bank PLC is a banking company incorporated in the People's Republic of Bangladesh with limited liability. It was set up at the instance of the Government in 1976 as a joint venture between the Government of Bangladesh and Sponsors in the private sector with the objective of working as a finance company within the country and setting up joint venture banks/financial institutions abroad. In 1983 when the Government allowed banks in the private sector, IFIC was converted into a full-fledged commercial bank. The Government of the People's Republic of Bangladesh (including Directors) holds 32.75% of the share capital of the Bank and the rest is held by Institutions both Local & Foreign and General Shareholders. The Government is being represented by two nominated Directors on the Board of the Bank. Among them, the current Board of Directors are formed by Bangladesh Bank with four Independent Directors.

== History ==
International Finance Investment and Commerce Bank Limited was established in 1976 as a joint venture between the Government of Bangladesh and private investors.

IFIC Bank established a joint venture bank in Nepal, called the Nepal Bangladesh Bank, with 50 per cent ownership in 1994.

Bangladesh Bank found evidence of fraud at IFIC Bank in January 1998 through fraudulent inland bills designed to siphon 1.55 billion BDT to companies, including BEXIMCO, linked to Salman F Rahman and Sohel F Rahman, directors of the bank.

In August 2004, IFIC Bank sued Beximco Holdings Ltd, a subsidiary of BEXIMCO, at the Dhaka Bankruptcy Court to recover 1.37 billion BDT from the company. Also accused in the case were A S F Rahman, Salman F Rahman, Iqbal Ahmed, and M A Qasem.

In August 2007, Bangladesh Bank found irregularities with the purchase of IFIC Bank shares by Mosaddak Ali Falu, former member of parliament of the Bangladesh Nationalist Party. He had violated Foreign Exchange Regulation Act and Money Laundering Prevention Act by purchasing shares under a Malaysia registered company, Bel Construction SDN BHD. The Malaysian company was owned by Falu, Enayetur Rahman, and Ekramul Haque. Falu and his partners owned 13.7 per cent of the shares and the government of Bangladesh owned 34.54 per cent shares. Of the remaining shares, AB Bank owned 18.31 per cent, Aga Yusuf family owned 3.56 per cent, and Islam Group owned 2.21 per cent.

Justice Zubayer Rahman Chowdhury of Bangladesh High Court issued a sixth week stay order on the annual general meeting of the bank in July 2009. The order followed a petition by Monirul Alam, a shareholder of the bank, requesting a stay and challenging his disqualification from standing for election to the board of directors of the bank.

In May 2014, two officials of IFIC Bank to five-year jail sentence for stealing from the bank 2.5 million taka in Chittagong along with three others.

Bangladesh Bank ordered the removal of Mohammad Lutfar Rahman Badal from the board of directors of IFIC Bank in October 2015. He is the secretary of Bangladesh Nationalist Party vice-chairman Tareque Rahman and was accused of being involved in opposition violence in Joydevpur in Gazipur District in August 2015. He was also co-owner of RTV and NTV along with Mosaddek Ali Falu. He had served as chairman of the board of directors from 2007 to 2008.

Bangladesh Bank gave permission to IFIC Bank to move US$12.28 million to Nepal Bangladesh Bank in Nepal from Bangladesh in February 2017. In June 2018, IFIC Bank moved to auction DuSai Resort to recover loans given to resort but the resort owner M Nasser Rahman, son of former Finance Minister of Bangladesh M Saifur Rahman, was able to secure a stay order from the courts. In February 2019, Ahmed Shayan Fazlur Rahman, son of Salman F Rahman, became vice-chairman of IFIC Bank. In June 2021, IFIC Bank announced plans to raise 10 billion BDT from perpetual bonds, nine billion BDT from private placement, and one billion BDT by public offer to meet the requirements of BASEL-III.

IFIC Bank announced plans to divest from Nepal Bangladesh Bank and sell its share, 40 per cent, in the bank to Nabil Bank in January 2022. It sold the shares for 4.39 billion BDT to Sarika Chaudhary wife of Binod Chaudhary. The bank issued five billion BDT worth of bonds in June.

Name of the Company IFIC Bank PLC	Off-shore Banking Unit (OBU) IFIC Bank PLC - OBU Federation Branch, FBCCI Building, 60 Motijheel C/A, Dhaka
Legal Form IFIC Bank PLC was incorporated in Bangladesh and registered with the Registrar of Joint Stock Companies & Firms as a public company limited by shares	Auditors M. J. Abedin & Co., Chartered Accountants
Company Registration Number C-4967, Dated: 8 October 1976	Legal Adviser Ahsanul Karim
Authorized Capital BDT 40,000.00 million	Tax Consultants Adil & Associates
Paid up Capital BDT 18,305.587 million	Credit Rating Agency Emerging Credit Rating Limited
Listing Status Listed with Dhaka Stock Exchange PLC (DSE) and Chittagong Stock Exchange PLC (CSE) in 1986 and 1997 respectively	Chairman Md. Mehmood Husain
Market Category 'B' Category	Managing Director Syed Mansur Mustafa
Tax Payer Identification Number (TIN) 135055865054	Head of ICC M. Mozibar Rahman
VAT Registration Number 19081167140	Chief Financial Officer Dilip Kumar Mandal, FCA
Business Identification Number (BIN) 000136288-0208	Company Secretary Mokammel Hoque, FCS
Subsidiary Companies IFIC Securities Limited IFIC Investment Limited IFIC Money Transfer (UK) Limited	No. of Employees 5,332
Registered Office IFIC Tower, 61 Purana Paltan GPO Box : 2229, Dhaka-1000 IP Phone No.: 09666716250 (Hunting) Fax: 880-2-44850205 Swift: IFIC BD DH	No. of Branches 187
Registered Office IFIC Tower, 61 Purana Paltan GPO Box : 2229, Dhaka-1000 IP Phone No.: 09666716250 (Hunting) Fax: 880-2-44850205 Swift: IFIC BD DH	No. of Uposhakhas 1214
Registered Office IFIC Tower, 61 Purana Paltan GPO Box : 2229, Dhaka-1000 IP Phone No.: 09666716250 (Hunting) Fax: 880-2-44850205 Swift: IFIC BD DH	No. of Shareholders 56,415
Registered Office IFIC Tower, 61 Purana Paltan GPO Box : 2229, Dhaka-1000 IP Phone No.: 09666716250 (Hunting) Fax: 880-2-44850205 Swift: IFIC BD DH	Investors' Relation IFIC Tower (17th Floor) 61 Purana Paltan, Dhaka-1000 Hotline: 09666716250

== Corporate Governance ==
=== Board of Directors ===
- Md. Mehmood Husain - Chairman & Independent Director
- Md. Ebtadul Islam - Independent Director
- Kazi Md. Mahboob Kasem, FCA - Independent Director
- Md. Golam Mostofa - Director
- Md. Monzorul Haque - Director
- Syed Mansur Mustafa - Managing Director
- Mokammel Hoque - Company Secretary

=== Executive Committee ===
- Md. Golam Mostofa - Chairman
- Md. Mehmood Husain - Member
- Mokammel Hoque - Secretary to the Committee

=== Head of Divisions ===
- Md. Monitur Rahman - DMD & Chief Information officer
- Helal Ahmed - Chief of Branch Business ‍& Head of Operations
- Sheikh Akhter Uddin Ahmed - DMD, Chief of Loan Performance Management & Chief Credit Officer
- Sohel Mahmud Zahiduzzaman - Head of Human Resource Management
- Mohammed Rashidul Kabir Rajib - Chief Risk Officer (CRO)

== See also ==
- Nepal Bangladesh Bank
