= Laxmi Bank =

Laxmi Sunrise Bank Limited लक्ष्मी सनराईज बैंक लिमिटेड
- Type: Public
- Traded as: NEPSE: 141
- Industry: Banking
- Founded: April 2002
- Headquarters: Laxmi Sunrise Bank Limited; Hattisar, Kathmandu
- Number of locations: 265 Branches
- Area served: Nepal
- Key people: Mr. Raman Nepal (chairman); Mr.Ajaya Bikram Shah (CEO)
- Products: consumer banking, corporate banking, finance and insurance, investment banking, mortgage loans, private banking, private equity, savings, Securities, asset management, wealth management, Credit cards,
- Number of employees: 2000+
- Subsidiaries: Laxmi Capital Market Limited
- Website: www.laxmisunrise.com

Laxmi Sunrise Bank Ltd. is the 16th commercial bank in Nepal, founded in 2002.

== History ==
In 2004 Laxmi Bank merged with HISEF Finance Limited, a first-generation finance company. This is the first merger in Nepali corporate history. In 2016, the Bank also acquired Professional Diyalo Bikas Bank, a regional development Bank.

Laxmi Bank is a Category 'A' Financial Institution and re-registered in 2006 under the Banks and Financial Institutions Act of Nepal. The Bank's shares are listed and actively traded in the Nepal Stock Exchange.

The bank also promoted a life insurance company known as Prime Life Insurance in 2007 and holds 15% shareholding stake in it.

The bank is primarily recognized for its stringent credit policies, conservative approach to banking and pioneers in technological innovations in banking services. Laxmi Bank's microfinance subsidiary – Laxmi Laghubitta Bittiya Sanstha Ltd, a category D financial institution licensed by Nepal Rastra Bank is in operation since 2012.

== Ownership structure ==
The Bank currently has a paid-up capital of 9.81 billion Nepalese rupees (as of FY 2018-19).

- Promoter Group - 51.05%
- General Public - 48.95%

== Subsidiaries ==
The bank's subsidiaries are as follows:

- LS Capital Limited
- Laxmi Laghubitta Bittiya Sanstha
- Sunrise securities Limited
