= Mega Bank Nepal =

Former Bank of Nepal

Mega Bank Nepal Limited मेगा बैंक लिमिटेड
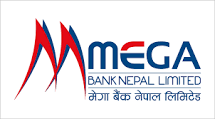
- Company type: Public
- Traded as: NEPSE: 562
- Industry: Banking, Financial services
- Founded: July 2010
- Headquarters: Rising Mall, Kamaladi, Kathmandu
- Number of locations: 208
- Area served: Nepal
- Key people: Bhoj Bahadur Shah Chairman
- Products: Loans, Credit cards, Savings, Investment, Merchant banking, Remittance
- Net income: ▲ रू283 crore (US$18 million) (2022)
- Number of employees: 1500+
- Subsidiaries: Mega Capital Market Ltd.
- Website: www.megabanknepal.com

Mega Bank Nepal Limited was an 'A' class commercial bank licensed by Nepal Rastra Bank and had branches all across the nation with its head office in Kathmandu which provides entire commercial banking services.

The bank's shares were publicly traded as an 'A' category company in the Nepal Stock Exchange under the ticker symbol MEGA.It merges with Nepal Investment Bank to form Nepal Investment Mega Bank. This new bank started joint operation from January 11, 2023.

== Network ==
Before the merger, the bank had 208 branches, 25 extension counter and 146 ATMs throughout Nepal. The bank also has 60 branchless banking centers and more than 2300 remit agents.

== See also ==
- List of banks in Nepal
- Commercial Banks of Nepal
