= NMB Bank Nepal =

Nepalese commercial bank

NMB Bank Limited एनएमबि बैंक लिमिटेड
- Company type: Public
- Traded as: NEPSE: NMB
- Industry: Banking, financial services
- Founded: 2008
- Headquarters: Babarmahal Kathmandu, Nepal
- Number of locations: 202 Branches
- Key people: Mr. Manoj Kumar Goyal (Chairperson); Mr. Govind Ghimire (CEO)
- Products: Banking Consumer banking, corporate banking, savings, securities
- Net income: ▲ रू328 crore (US$21 million) (2024)
- Number of employees: 1900+
- Subsidiaries: NMB Capital Ltd.
- Rating: A−
- Website: www.nmb.com.np

NMB Bank Nepal is a commercial bank in Nepal with headquarters in Kathmandu. The bank is licensed by central bank of Nepal, the Nepal Rastra Bank, and has 202 branches across the nation providing retail and commercial banking services.

The bank's shares are publicly traded on the Nepal Stock Exchange. The Bank has a joint venture agreement with Netherlands Development Finance Company (FMO) a Dutch development bank which holds 13.69% of the bank's shares and is the largest shareholder of the Bank.

== History ==
It was founded in May 2008 and is licensed as an "A" class financial institution. It was created as a merger with four financial institutions, Bhrikuti Development Bank, Pathibhara Bikas Bank, Prudential Finance Company, Clean Energy Development.

In September 2016, the bank signed a joint venture agreement with the Netherlands Development Finance Company (Nederlandse Financierings-Maatschappij voor Ontwikkelingslanden, following which FMO became the single largest shareholder of the bank.

NMB Bank has been recognized as 'Bank of the Year in Nepal' for two consecutive years, 2017 and 2018 by The Banker, a service of the Financial Times, for its leading role in the country's financial sector by using new digital technologies. In September 2019 NMB Bank has acquired Om Development Bank.

== Ownership structure ==
The Bank currently has a paid-up capital of 18.37 billion Nepalese rupees (as of FY 2023/24).

- Promoter Group - 51.00%
- General Public - 49.00%

== Subsidiaries ==
The bank's subsidiaries are as follows:

- NMB Capital Limited.
- NMB Securities Limited.
- NMB Laghubitta Bittiya Sanstha Limited.

== See also ==
- List of banks in Nepal
