= Himalayan Bank =

Bank in Nepal

Himalayan Bank Limited हिमालयन बैंक लिमिटेड
- Type: Public
- Traded as: NEPSE: 134
- Industry: Banking
- Founded: January 18, 1993; 33 years ago
- Headquarters: Kamaladi, Kathmandu, Nepal
- Number of locations: 210+ Branches
- Area served: Nepal
- Key people: Mr. Prachanda Bahadur Shrestha (Chairman); Mr. Ashoke SJB Rana; CEO
- Products: Loans, Credit cards, Savings, Investment, Merchant banking
- Number of employees: 1800
- Subsidiaries: Himalayan Capital Limited Himalayan Securities Limited Himalayan Laghubitta Bittiya Sanstha Limited
- Website: himalayanbank.com

Himalayan Bank Limited (HBL) is one of the largest private banks in Nepal. The bank was incorporated in 1992 by a few eminent individuals of Nepal in partnership with the Employees Provident Fund and Habib Bank Limited of Pakistan. The bank commenced its operations in January 1993. Himalayan Bank is also the first commercial bank of Nepal with most of its shares held by the private sector of Nepal. The bank has its head and corporate office at Kamaladi, Kathmandu.

Mr. Ashoke SJB Rana is the chief executive officer of the bank. Among the top management are Mr. Ujjal Rajbhandary, DCEO and Mr. Anup Maskey, DCEO.

The bank holds the legacy of introducing various banking services for the first time in Nepal from the very beginning. Products such as Premium Savings Account, HBL Proprietary Card and Millionaire Deposit Scheme besides services such as ATMs and Tele-banking were first introduced by HBL which was able to win customers' hearts during that time. Since its establishment, the bank has been highly focused on innovative approaches and customer satisfaction. The bank started its journey from Employees Provident Fund Building, popularly known as Sanchayakosh Building at Thamel, Kathmandu. Himalayan Bank has acquired Civil Bank on Falgun 12, 2079 BS.

Civil Bank Limited at 100:80.28 swap ratio (A shareholders holding 100 scrips of CBL will get 80.28 scrips of HBL) and commenced the joint operation as "Himalayan Bank Limited" from February 24, 2023. Currently, the operation serves its customers from a total of 190 Branch Offices and 20 Extension Counters spread all over Nepal.

== Ownership structure ==
The Bank currently has a paid-up capital of 22.6 billion Nepalese rupees (as of FY 2025/26).

- Promoter Group - 70%
- General Public - 30%

== Subsidiaries ==
The bank's subsidiaries are as follows:

- Himalayan Capital Limited.
- Himalayan Securities Limited.
- Himalayan Laghubitta Bittiya Sanstha Limited.
