= Standard Chartered Bank Nepal =

Standard Chartered Bank Nepal Ltd.
- Native name: स्टान्डर्ड चार्टर्ड बैंक नेपाल लि.
- Company type: Public
- Traded as: NEPSE: 133
- Industry: Banking
- Founded: 30 January 1987; 39 years ago
- Headquarters: New Baneshwor, Kathmandu, Nepal
- Area served: Nepal
- Key people: Venugopal Ranganathan (chairman); Gorakh SJB Rana (CEO)
- Products: Banking
- Parent: Standard Chartered
- Website: www.sc.com/np

Standard Chartered Nepal (officially Standard Chartered Bank Nepal Limited; Nepali: स्टान्डर्ड चार्टर्ड बैंक नेपाल लिमिटेड) is a banking and financial services company in Nepal and a subsidiary of Standard Chartered PLC. Currently it is the only international commercial bank operating in the country.

== History ==
It was established on 30 January 1987, with 70.21% ownership by Standard Chartered Group and 29.79% ownership by the Nepalese public.

Based on a study by University of Nottingham, Standard Chartered Nepal brought positive changes to the local community in terms of setting up a role model of ESG goals.
