= Janata Bank Nepal Limited =

Nepalese commercial bank

Global IME Bank Limited
- Company type: Public
- Traded as: NEPSE: GBIME
- Industry: Banking
- Founded: 2010
- Headquarters: Kamaladi, Kathmandu, Nepal
- Area served: Nepal
- Key people: Mr. Ratna Raj Bajracharya CEO
- Products: Loans, Credit cards, Savings, Investment, Merchant banking
- Number of employees: 3,500+
- Website: www.globalimebank.com

Global IME Bank Limited (Formarly Janata Bank Nepal Limited) is a commercial bank in Nepal. The bank was an ‘A’ class commercial bank licensed by Nepal Rastra Bank and had branches all across the nation with its head office in Kathmandu which provided a complete commercial banking service. The Bank was formed merging formar Janata Bank Nepal Limited and Global IME Bank Limited.

The bank's shares were publicly traded as an 'A' category company in the Nepal Stock Exchange. The Bank has been merged with Global IME Bank Limited and since being operated with later name.

== Correspondent Network ==
The bank had been maintaining harmonious correspondent relationships with various international banks from various countries to facilitate trade, remittance and other cross border services. Through these correspondents the bank was able to provide services in any major currencies in the world.

== Merger agreement ==
Janata Bank signed an agreement with Global IME Bank Limited on 20th Asar 2076 according to which the name of bank will remains the same but the core members will be changed. Merger was completed and joint transactions was started on the name of Global IME Bank Limited from 6 December 2019.

== See also ==
- list of banks in Nepal
- Commercial Banks of Nepal
