= Nepal SBI Bank =

Indo-Nepal joint venture

Nepal SBI Bank Limited
- Type: Public
- Traded as: NEPSE: SBI
- Industry: Banking
- Founded: July 17, 1992; 34 years ago
- Headquarters: Kamaladi, Kathmandu, Nepal
- Number of locations: 127 Service Outlets; 121 ATM terminals; 13 Branchless Banking
- Area served: Nepal
- Key people: Mr. Ram Kumar Tiwari (CEO) Mr. Vikas Anand (COO) Mr. Rajesh Kumar Panda (CFO)
- Products: Loans, debit cards, savings, investment, internet banking, locker, Instant cards, mobile banking: YONO Nepal SBI
- Operating income: ▲ रू7.33 billion (Fiscal year 2022–23 AD; 2079–80 BS); रू5.79 billion (Fiscal year 2021–22 AD; 2078–79 BS)
- Net income: ▲ रू1.97 billion (Fiscal year 2022–23 AD; 2079–80 BS); रू1.64 billion (Fiscal year 2021–22 AD; 2078–79 BS)
- Number of employees: 937 as on Poush 2080
- Parent: State Bank of India (SBI)
- Subsidiaries: Nepal SBI Merchant Banking Ltd. (NSMBL)
- Website: nsbl.statebank

Nepal SBI Bank Limited (NSBL) is the first Indo-Nepal joint venture in the financial sector. Sponsored by three institutional promoters, namely the State Bank of India (SBI), Employees Provident Fund and Agricultural Development Bank of Nepal through a memorandum of understanding signed on 17 July 1992.

== About ==
NSBL was incorporated as a Public Limited Company at the Office of the Company Registrar on 28 April 1993 with an Authorized Capital of Rs. 120 million and was licensed by Nepal Rastra Bank on 6 July 1993. NSBL commenced operation with effect from 7 July 1993 with one full-fledged office at Durbarmarg, Kathmandu with 18 staff members. The number of staff has since increased to 937 people working in 97 branches, 22 extension counters, 7 Provincial Offices, 13 branchless banking, and a corporate office.

Under the Banks & Financial Institutions Act, 2063, Nepal Rastra Bank was granted a license to NSBL classifying it as an "A" class licensed institution on 26 April 2006 under license No. NRB/I.Pra.Ka.7/062/63. The Authorized capital is Rs. 15,000.0 million and Paid up Capital is Rs. 10,500.15 million. The management team consists of managing director & CEO, Dy. CEO & Chief financial officer and chief operating officer from SBI (They are deputed by SBI for management support as per the Technical Services Agreement).

The State Bank of India (SBI) holds 55 percent of the total share capital of the Bank, 15 percent is held by the Employees Provident Fund and the balance is held by the general public.

In terms of the Technical Services Agreement between SBI and the NSBL, the former provides management support to the bank through its expatriate officers including managing director who is also the CEO of the Bank. Central Management Committee (CENMAC) consisting of the Managing Director & CEO, Dy. CEO & Chief Financial Officer & Chief Operating Officer oversee the overall banking operations in the Bank.

The State Bank of India (SBI), with a history of over 200 years, is the largest commercial bank in India in terms of assets, deposits, profits, branches, customers and employees. The Government of India is the single largest shareholder of this Fortune 500 entity, with 57.50% ownership.

The origins of State Bank of India date back to 1806 when the Bank of Calcutta (later called the Bank of Bengal) was established. In 1921, the Bank of Bengal and two other banks (Bank of Madras and Bank of Bombay) were amalgamated to form the Imperial Bank of India. In 1955, the Reserve Bank of India acquired the controlling interests of the Imperial Bank of India and SBI was created by an act of Parliament to succeed the Imperial Bank of India.

The SBI group consists of SBI and its numerous Subsidiaries. The group has an extensive network, with over 22,405 branches in India and another 235 offices in 29 countries across the world. As of 31 March 2023, the group had assets worth US$790 billion, deposits of US$532.18 billion and capital & reserves in excess of US$39.41 billion. The group commands over 22.84% share of deposit in Indian banking market.

SBI's non-banking subsidiaries and joint ventures provide services such as Life Insurance, General Insurance, Merchant Banking, Mutual Funds, Credit Cards, Factoring Services, Security Trading and Primary Dealership. SBI also has arrangements with various local and international banks to exchange financial messages through SWIFT with the various business centers of the world to facilitate trade related banking business.

== Ownership structure ==
The Bank currently has a paid-up capital of Nepalese Rupees 26.23 Billion (as of FY 2022/23)

- Promoter Group - 70.36%
- General Public - 29.24%

== Subsidiaries ==
The bank's subsidiaries are as follows:

- Nepal SBI Merchant Banking Limited.
