= Global IME Bank Limited =

Nepalese commercial bank

- Type: Public
- Traded as: NEPSE: GBIME
- Industry: Banking
- Founded: January 2007, 02; 19 years ago
- Headquarters: Kamaladi, Kathmandu, Nepal
- Number of locations: 440
- Area served: Nepal
- Key people: Mr. Chandra Prasad Dhakal (Chairman); Mr. Surendra Raj Regmi CEO; Mr. Magne Buda (Kedar Ghimire) CFO
- Products: Loans, Credit cards, Savings, Investment, Merchant banking
- Net income: ▼ रू1.5 crore (US$100,000) (2083 B.S. Q1)
- Number of employees: 3,600+
- Website: www.globalimebank.com

Global IME Bank Limited (originally founded as Global Bank Limited) is a commercial bank in Nepal. In 2012, it merged with the former IME Financial Institution Limited and Lord Buddha Finance Limited, subsequently rebranding and operating as Global IME Bank Limited. The bank is an 'A' class commercial bank licensed by Nepal Rastra Bank and has branches all across the nation with its head office in Kathmandu which provides a complete commercial banking service. Over time, the bank has expanded through the merger and acquisition of 21 banking and financial institutions (BFIs), including five commercial banks: Commerz and Trust Bank, Global Bank, Janata Bank Nepal, Lumbini Bank, and Bank of Kathmandu. Global Finance Magazine awarded Global IME Bank the "Best Bank Award 2025" for the second consecutive year.

== Ownership structure ==
The Bank currently has a paid-up capital of Nepalese Rupees 38.1158 Billion (as of FY 2023/24), largest in the country.

- Promoter Group - 51.24%
- General Public - 48.76%

== Subsidiaries ==
The bank's subsidiaries are as follows:

- Global IME Capital Limited.
- Global IME Securities Limited.
- Global IME Laghubitta Bittiya Sanstha Limited.
- Bank of Kathmandu
- Janta Bikas Bank
- Gulmi Bikas Bank

== Correspondent Network ==
The bank had been maintaining harmonious correspondent relationships with various international banks from various countries to facilitate trade, remittance and other cross border services. Through these correspondents the bank was able to provide services in any major currencies in the world.

== See also ==
- list of banks in Nepal
- Commercial Banks of Nepal
