= Machhapuchchhre Bank =

Nepalese commercial bank

Machhapuchchhre Bank माछापुच्छ्रे बैंक
- Type: Public
- Traded as: NEPSE: 140
- Industry: Banking
- Founded: 7 September 2000; 25 years ago
- Headquarters: Lazimpat, Kathmandu
- Number of locations: 157
- Area served: Nepal
- Key people: Mr. Roshan KC (chairman); Mr. Santosh Koirala (CEO)
- Products: Smart Retail banking, Corporate banking, Credit cards, Digital Loans, Digital banking, Savings, Investment, Merchant bank
- Number of employees: 1500+
- Website: www.machbank.com

Machhapuchchhre Bank Limited registered in 1998 as the first regional commercial bank from the western region of Nepal. The 'A' class commercial bank started its banking operations from its own head office located in the foothills of Machhapuchchhre in the town of Pokhara since year 2000.

== Ownership structure ==
The Bank currently has a paid-up capital of Nepalese Rupees 12.08 Billion (as of FY 2025/26)

- Promoter Group - 51.00%
- General Public - 49.00%

== Subsidiaries ==
The bank's subsidiaries are as follows:

- Machhapuchre Capital Limited.
- Machhapuchre Securities Limited.

== See also ==
- List of banks in Nepal
