= NIC ASIA Bank =

Nepalese bank

- NIC ASIA Bank
- Native name: एन.आई.सी.एशिया बैंक
- Company type: Public Limited
- Traded as: NEPSE: NICA
- Industry: Banking, financial services
- Founded: 1998
- Headquarters: Nepal, Kamaladi, Kathmandu
- Number of locations: 300+
- Area served: Nepal
- Key people: Mr. Ashok Agrawal (chairman); Sujit Kumar Shakya CEO
- Products: Consumer banking, corporate banking, finance and insurance, investment banking, mortgage loans, private banking, private equity, savings, securities, asset management, wealth management, credit cards
- Number of employees: 3000+
- Subsidiaries: NIC Asia Capital Ltd.
- Website: www.nicasiabank.com

NIC ASIA Bank was founded as Nepal Industrial and Commercial Bank on 21 July 1998. It was renamed NIC ASIA Bank on 30 June 2013 after it merged with Bank of Asia. The merger was the first between of two commercial banks in the Nepalese Banking history. After the merger, NIC ASIA was recognized as "Bank of the Year 2013-Nepal" by The Banker, Financial Times, UK. This is the second time that the bank was recognized with this prestigious award, the previous occasion being in 2007. The Bank has successfully completed its 21 years of operation. The company has currently the following wholly owned subsidiaries: NIC Asia Capital Limited and NIC Asia Laghubittiya Sanstha limited.

The bank, with its 360 branches, 647 ATMs, 108 extension counters, 41 branchless banking service, and 647 ATMs across the country, serving all major financial centers. The head office of NIC ASIA Bank is located in Kamaladi, Kathmandu, Nepal. It is the largest bank in terms of footprint expansion, customer base including balance sheet size. Currently bank is providing services to more than 3 million customers (April 2022).

The bank is headed by Mr. Ashok Kumar Agrawal as its chairman and Mr. Sujit Kumar Shakya as chief executive officer.

== Ownership structure ==
The bank currently has a paid-up capital of 14.92 billion Nepalese rupees (as of FY 2023/24).

- Promoter Group - 51.00%
- General Public - 49.00%

== Subsidiaries ==
The bank's subsidiaries are as follows:

- NIC asia Capital Limited.
- NIC asia Laghubitta Bittiya Sanstha Limited.

== See also ==
- List of banks in Nepal
- Nepal Stock Exchange
