= Everest Bank =

Nepalese commercial bank

Everest Bank एभरेष्ट बैंक
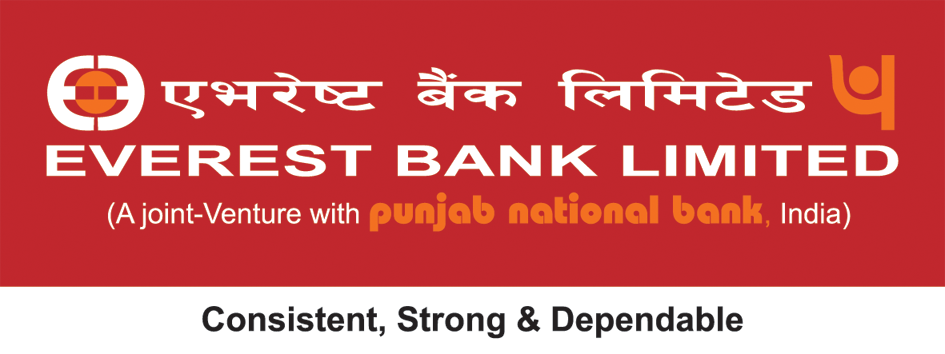
- Type: Public company
- Traded as: NEPSE: 137
- Industry: Banking, financial services
- Founded: 1994
- Headquarters: Lazimpat, Kathmandu, Nepal,
- Number of locations: 127 branches
- Area served: Nepal
- Key people: Mr.B.K Shrestha (Chairman); Mr Sudesh Khaling CEO
- Products: consumer banking, corporate banking, finance and insurance, investment banking, mortgage loans, private banking, private equity, savings, Securities, asset management, wealth management, Credit cards,
- Website: www.everestbankltd.com

Everest Bank Limited is a commercial bank of Nepal which is a joint venture of Punjab National Bank, India which holds 20% equity shares of Bank. It is the first Nepalese bank which has a Representative Office in India. The bank has a wide network of 133 branches, 161 ATM counters, 33 revenue collection counters and 4 extension counters and many correspondents across the globe.

The Board of Everest Bank Ltd. appointed Mr. Sudesh Khaling as the first Nepali Chief Executive Officer CEO in its 25-year journey. Earlier, the bank had been appointing only Indian nationals as the CEO of the bank.

== Ownership structure ==
The Bank currently has a paid-up capital of 13.7 billion Nepalese rupees (as of FY 2025/26).

- Promoter Group - 59.23%
- General Public - 40.77%
