= Prabhu Bank =

Nepalese commercial bank

Prabhu Bank Limited
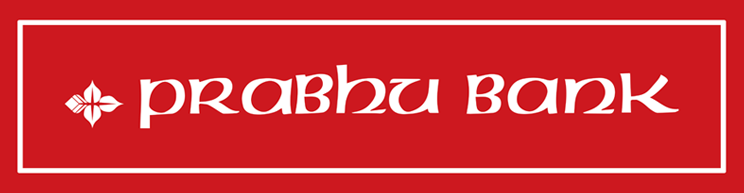

- Head office on Babarmahal, Kathmandu
- Native name: प्रभु बैक लिमिटेड
- Type: Public
- Traded as: NEPSE: 255
- Industry: Banking, Financial services
- Founded: 2001
- Headquarters: Babarmahal, Kathmandu
- Number of locations: 300 (2025)
- Area served: Nepal
- Key people: Kishor Jung Karki (chairman); Suman Sharma (CEO)
- Services: Banking, Loans, Credit card, Savings, Investment, Merchant banking
- Net income: ▲ रू260 crore (US$17 million) (2022)
- Number of employees: 2000+
- Subsidiaries: Prabhu Capital Ltd.
- Website: www.prabhubank.com

Prabhu Bank Limited is a commercial bank in Nepal. The bank is an 'A' class commercial bank licensed by Nepal Rastra Bank and has branches all across the nation with its head office in Kathmandu which provides entire commercial banking services.

The bank's shares are publicly traded as an 'A' category company in the Nepal Stock Exchange.

== Ownership structure ==
The Bank currently has a paid-up capital of 23.54 billion Nepalese rupees (as of FY 2023/24).

- Promoter Group - 51.00%
- General Public - 49.00%

== Subsidiaries ==
The bank's subsidiaries are as follows:

- Prabhu Capital Limited.
- Prabhu Stock Market Limited.

== Correspondent Network ==
The bank has been maintaining harmonious correspondent relationships with various international banks from various countries to facilitate trade, remittance, and other cross border services. Through these correspondents, the bank is able to provide services in any major currencies in the world.

== See also ==
- List of banks in Nepal
- Commercial Banks of Nepal
