= Nabil Bank =

Nepalese commercial bank

Nabil Bank Limited नबिल बैंक लिमिटेड
- Company type: Public
- Traded as: NEPSE: 131
- Industry: Banking, financial services
- Predecessor: Nepal Arab Bank Ltd
- Founded: 12 July 1984; 41 years ago
- Headquarters: Nabil Center, Durbarmarg, Kathmandu, Nepal
- Number of locations: 268 Branches (2024)
- Area served: Nepal
- Key people: Nirvana Chaudhary (chairman); Manoj Kumar Gyawali (CEO)
- Products: Banking Consumer banking, corporate banking, finance and insurance, investment banking, savings, securities
- Net income: ▲ रू706 crore (US$46 million) (2024)
- Number of employees: 2239
- Subsidiaries: Nabil Investment Banking Ltd., Nabil Stock Dealer Limited.
- Rating: A
- Website: nabilbank.com

Nabil Bank, (Nepali: नबिल बैंक लिमिटेड; NEPSE: 131) formerly known as Nepal Arab Bank Limited, is the first foreign joint venture commercial bank in Nepal, established in 1984. It provides a wide range of commercial banking services, including branch banking, treasury, trade, cards, remittance, and investment banking through its subsidiary, Nabil Investment Banking Ltd. The bank operates an extensive network of 268 branches, 317 ATMs, and numerous correspondent banking relationships.

== History ==
Founded in 1984, the bank has 7 province offices and branches across the nation and its head office in Durbar Marg, Kathmandu.

It began as the first bank in Nepal incepted by multinational (primarily foreign) investors (as Nepal Arab Bank Ltd) on 12 July 1984. The bank was incorporated with the objective of providing modern, international-standard financial services to businesses.

Its Dubai government-owned majority share was purchased in 1995 by Nepal's only billionaire businessman, Binod Chaudhary. It maintains its head office at its Nabil Center, Durbar Marg flanking the chief avenue of the capital leading to its grand palace. Nabil Bank operates through its wide network of 268 branch offices, 316 ATMs, numerous POS terminals, and remittance agents spread across the nation.

The Bank also has more than 200 international correspondent banking relationships. Nabil Bank operates its investment banking arm through its subsidiary Nabil Investment Banking Ltd.

Nabil bank had acquired Nepal Bangladesh Bank in July 2022.

On 22 December 2022, Nabil Bank launched nBank, a neo banking service that works as a virtual branch of the bank.

Gyanendra Dhungana was appointed the chief executive officer on 1 July 2022 after the tenure of the celebrity banker Anil Keshary Shah was over.

== Ownership structure ==
The Bank currently has a paid-up capital of 27.06 billion Nepalese Rupees (as of FY 2023/24).

- Promoter Group - 58.44%
- General Public - 41.56%

== Subsidiaries ==
The bank's subsidiaries are as follows:

- Nabil Investment Banking Limited.
- Nabil Stock Dealer.

== See also ==
- List of banks in Nepal
- Commercial Banks of Nepal
