= Agriculture Development Bank =

Nepali financial services company

Agricultural Development Bank कृषि विकास बैंक
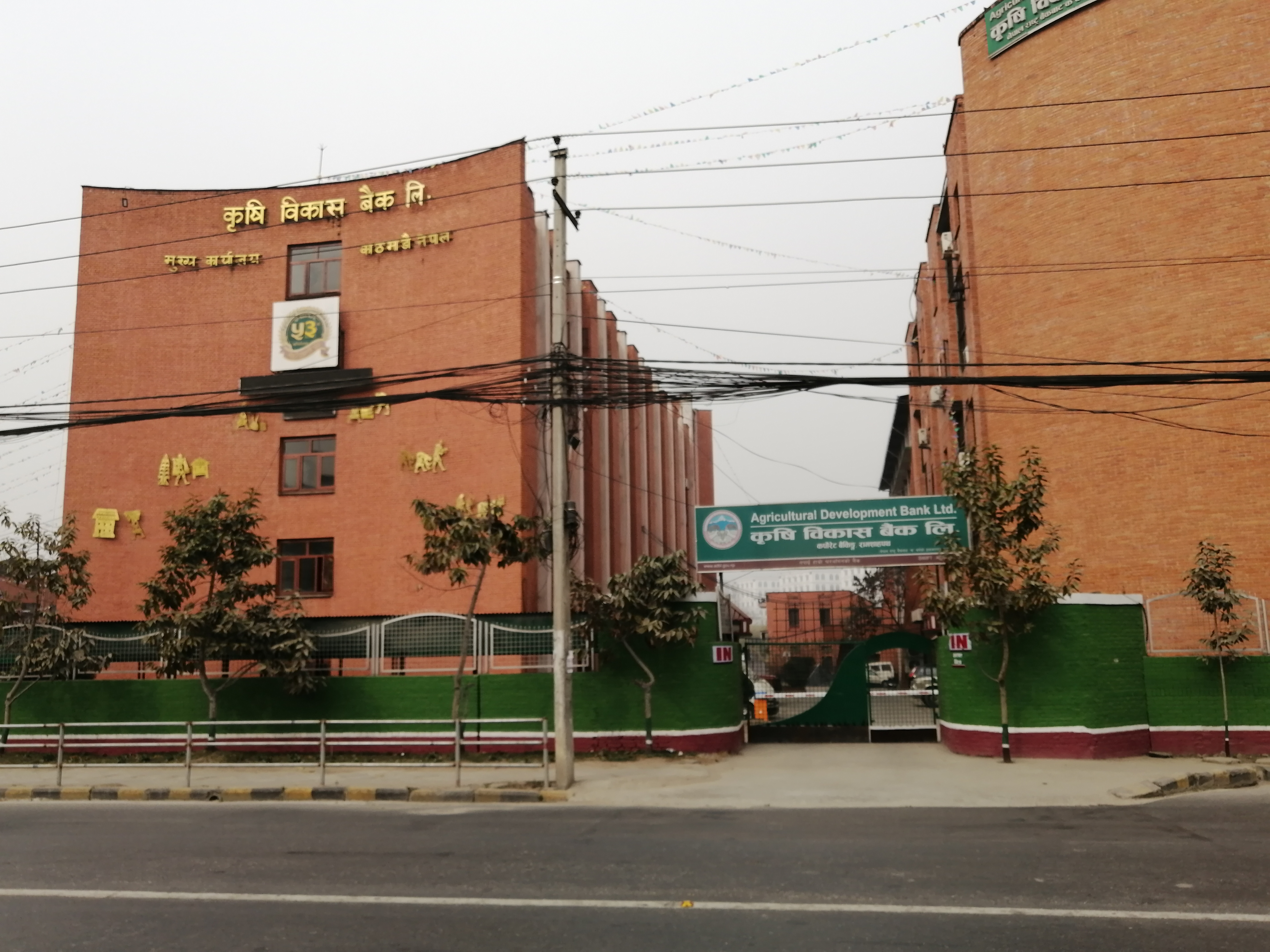
- Company type: Public
- Traded as: NEPSE: 397
- Industry: Banking
- Founded: January 21, 1968; 58 years ago
- Headquarters: Singha Durbar Plaza, Kathmandu
- Number of locations: 279 branches
- Area served: Nepal
- Key people: Mr. Dim Prasad Poudel (Chairman of the Board) Govinda Gurung (CEO)
- Products: Loans, savings, investment (focused in agricultural sectors)
- Number of employees: 2402
- Website: adbl.gov.np

Agricultural Development Bank Limited (ADBL) is an autonomous organization largely owned by Government of Nepal.

== History ==
The bank has been working as a premier rural credit institution since the last three decades, contributing more than 67 percent of the institutional credit supply in the country. Hence, rural finance is the principal operational area of ADBL. It has also been executing Small Farmer Development Program (SFDP), the major poverty alleviation program launched in the country. Furthermore, the bank has also been involved in commercial banking operations since 1984.

The enactment of the Bank and Financial Institution Act (BAFIA) in February 2004 abolished all Acts related to financial institutions including the ADBN Act, 1967. In line with the BAFIA, ADBL has been incorporated as a public limited company on July 14, 2005. Thus, ADBL operates as an "A" category financial Institution under the legal framework of BAFIA and the Company Act. The bank has a 51% share of the Government of Nepal and 49% of the general public. Most of its shareholders are customers and employees.

Its headquarters is in Ramshah Path, Kathmandu.
