= Nepal Bank =

First Bank of Nepal (also, First Commercial Bank of Nepal)

Nepal Bank Limited
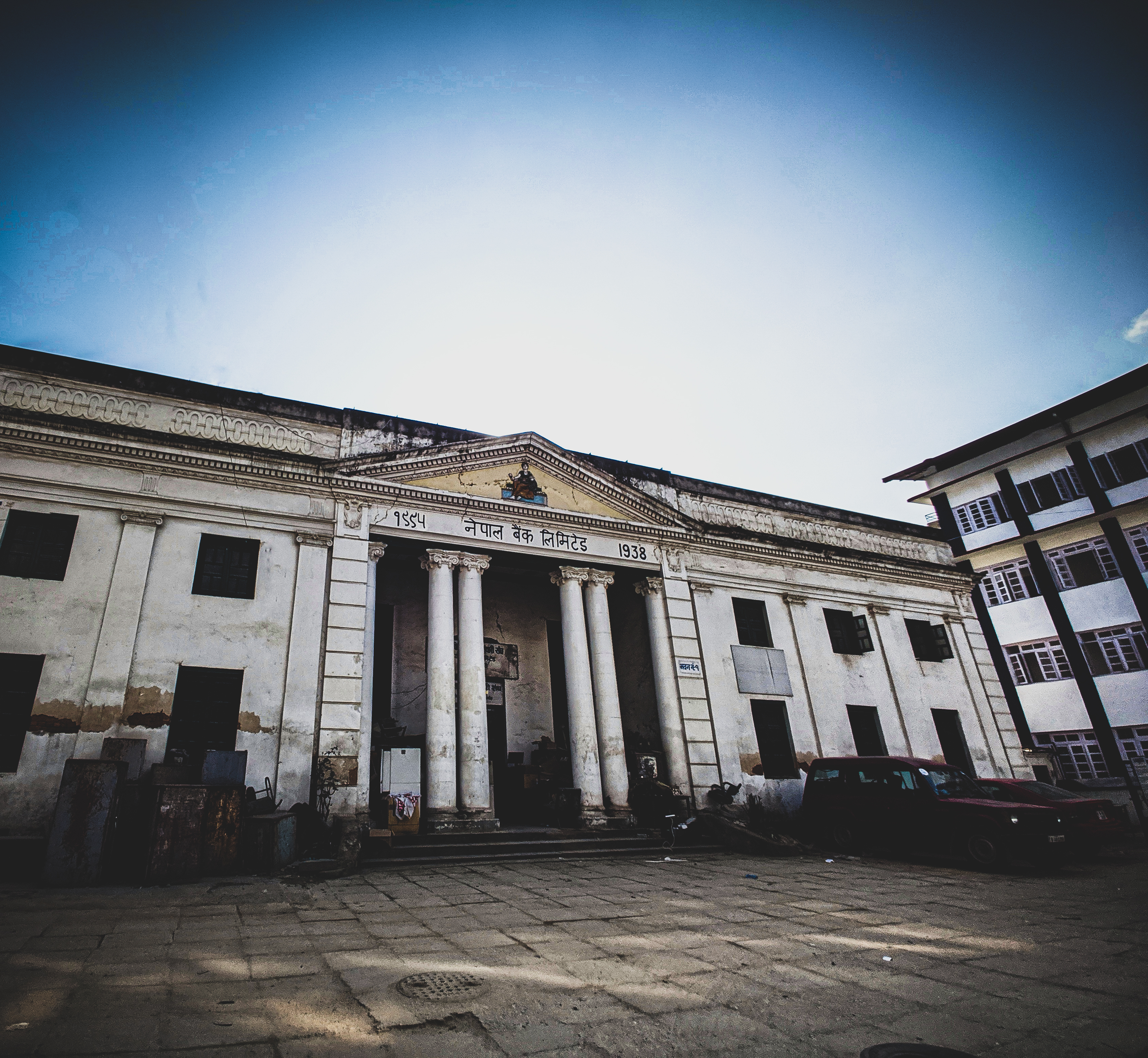
- Central Office Building of Nepal Bank Limited
- Native name: नेपाल बैंक लिमिटेड
- Company type: Government-owned
- Traded as: NEPSE: 517
- Industry: Banking, Financial services
- Founded: November 15, 1937
- Headquarters: Dharmapath, Kathmandu Nepal
- Number of locations: 228
- Area served: Nepal
- Key people: Dr. Dilli Raj Sharma(chairman); Tilak Raj Pandey CEO; Samata Pant (Bhatta) (Deputy CEO)
- Products: Debit & credit cards, consumer banking, corporate banking, financial services, investment banking, mortgage loans, private banking
- Net income: ▲ रू326 crore (US$21 million) (2022)
- Number of employees: 1000+
- Website: nepalbank.com.np

Nepal Bank Limited (Nepali: नेपाल बैंक लिमिटेड) is the first commercial bank of Nepal. It was established in 1937, by Juddha Shumsher, which marked the beginning of an era of formal banking in Nepal.

== History ==
On November 15, 1937 (Kartik 30, 1994), the then King Tribhuvan inaugurated Nepal Bank Limited. This marked the beginning of an era of formal banking in Nepal. Until then all monetary transactions were carried out by private dealers and trading center.

In that era, very few understood or had confidence in this new concept of formal banking. Rising equity shares were not easy and mobilization of deposits even more difficult. This was evident when the bank floated equity shares worth NPR 2,500,000, but was successful only in raising NPR 842,000.

The total deposits for the first year was NPR 1,702,025 where current deposits was about NPR 1,298,898 fixed was about NPR 388,964 and saving was NPR 14,163. Loan disbursed and outstanding at the end of the first year was NPR 1,985,000. In 2007, Nepal Bank Limited appointed Mr Rohit Ghambole as chief banker.

From the very conception and its creation, NBL was as joint venture between the government and the private sector. Out of 2500 equity shares of NPR 100 face value, 60% was subscribed by the government and the balanced 40% was offered for the sale to private sector. There were only 10 shareholders when the bank first started.

== Introduction ==
When NBL was established, it was formed under the principle of Joint venture (Joint venture between Government and general public). NBL's authorized capital was NPR 100 million and issued capital NPR 2.5 million of which paid-up capital was NPR 842,000 with 10 shareholders. The bank has been providing banking through its branch offices in the different geographical locations of the country.

== Services ==
Nepal Bank Limited is providing services to its customers from its 217 branches. It provides deposit facility, various loan facilities, advanced ABBS services from 162 branches, Internet Banking along with the ATM facilities through 144 ATM terminals all over the country.
