= Kumari Bank =

Nepalese bank

Kumari Bank कुमारी बैंक लिमिटेड
- Kumari Bank Limited
- Type: Public
- Traded as: NEPSE: 142
- Industry: Banking, financial services
- Founded: 2001
- Headquarters: Tangal Kathmandu, Nepal
- Number of locations: 303 Branches (2025)
- Area served: Nepal
- Key people: Mr. Amir Pratap J.B. Rana (chairman); Mr. Ram Chandra Khanal (CEO)
- Products: Banking Consumer banking, corporate banking, finance and insurance, investment banking, savings, securities
- Net income: ▲ रू211 crore (US$14 million) (2024)
- Subsidiaries: Kumari Capital Limited.
- Rating: BB+
- Website: www.kumaribank.com

Kumari Bank Limited is the fifteenth commercial bank in Nepal that launched in 2001. At establishment, it had an authorized capital of NPR 2 billion and a paid-up capital of NPR 1.83 billion.

== History ==
Kumari Bank Limited is the fifteenth commercial bank of Nepal, established in Chaitra 21, 2057 B.S (April 3, 2001) with an objective of providing competitive modern banking services in the Nepalese financial market. The bank has a paid-up capital of NPR 26.23 billion.

The Bank has been offering both Domestic and International Visa Debit and Credit Cards, accessible in all VISA linked ATMs in Nepal and India. It serves through 294 ATMs and over 1,200 POS terminals across the country. Additionally, the Bank offers the latest digital banking services such as mobile banking, online banking, Viber banking and QR payments. It has transparent business practices, professional management, corporate governance, and Total Quality Management as the organizational mission.

Its head office is located in Tangal, Kathmandu. The current CEO of Kumari Bank Limited is Mr. Ram Chandra Khanal.

== Ownership structure ==
The Bank currently has a paid-up capital of 22.6 billion Nepalese rupees (as of FY 2025/26).

- Promoter Group - 51%
- General Public - 49%

== Subsidiaries ==
The bank's subsidiaries are as follows:

- Kumari Capital Limited.
- KBL Securities Limited.

== See also ==
- List of banks in Nepal
- Nepal Stock Exchange
- Nepal Rastra Bank
