= Rastriya Banijya Bank =

Largest Commercial Bank of Nepal

Rastriya Banijya Bank Limited राष्ट्रिय वाणिज्य बैंक लिमिटेड
- Company type: Government owned
- Industry: Banking
- Founded: 23 January 1966; 60 years ago
- Headquarters: Singha Durbar Plaza, Kathmandu, Nepal
- Number of locations: 300+ Branches
- Area served: Nepal
- Key people: Mr. Dev Kumar Dhakal (chairman); Devendra Raman Khanal CEO
- Products: Banking, Loans, Credit card, Savings, Investment, Merchant banking
- Number of employees: 3000+
- Website: rbb.com.np

Rastriya Banijya Bank (RBB) (translation: National Commercial Bank; Nepali: राष्ट्रिय वाणिज्य बैंक) is fully government owned, and the largest commercial bank in Nepal. RBB was established on January 23, 1966 (2022 Magh 10 BS) under the RBB Act. RBB provides banking services to customers including banks, insurance companies, industrial trading houses, airlines, hotels, and many other sectors.

Constituted under RBB Act 2021 with the full ownership of the government of Nepal, the bank has been running under Bank and Financial Institute Act (BAFIA) and Company Act (CA) 2063. The bank, licensed by NRB as an 'A' class commercial bank of the country, is a component of the Nepalese economy.

== Ownership structure ==
The Bank currently has a paid-up capital of 15.64 billion Nepalese rupees (as of FY 2023/24).

- Nepal Government - 99.97%
- General Public - 0.03%

== Subsidiaries ==
The bank's subsidiaries are as follows:

- RBB Merchant Banking Limited.
- RBB Securities Limited.
