= Nepal Investment Mega Bank =

Commercial bank of Nepal

Nepal Investment Mega Bank Limited(NIMB)
- Company type: Public
- Traded as: NEPSE:
- Industry: Banking
- Founded: 27 February 1986; 40 years ago
- Headquarters: Durbar Marg Kathmandu, Nepal
- Number of locations: 200+
- Area served: Nepal, India
- Key people: Prithvi Bahadur Pande (Chairman); Jyoti Prakash Pandey (CEO)
- Products: Banking
- Number of employees: 2000+
- Website: nibl.com.np

Nepal Investment Mega Bank Limited (NIMB) is one of the leading commercial banks of Nepal. Previously known as Nepal Investment Bank Ltd., the bank was established in 1986 as a joint venture between Nepalese and Credit Agricole Indosuez. The Nepalese investors bought all the shares of French company i.e. 50% in 2001. It was merged with Mega Bank Nepal in 2023 and started joint operation from January 11, 2023, with the name Nepal Investment Mega Bank Limited.

== Ownership structure ==
The Bank currently has a paid-up capital of 34.13 billion Nepalese rupees (as of FY 2025/26).

- Promoter Group - 60.81%
- General Public - 39.19%

== Subsidiaries ==
The bank's subsidiaries are as follows:

- NIMB Ace Capital Limited.
- NIMB Stock Markets.
