= Branch (banking) =

Retail location of a bank, credit union, or other financial institution

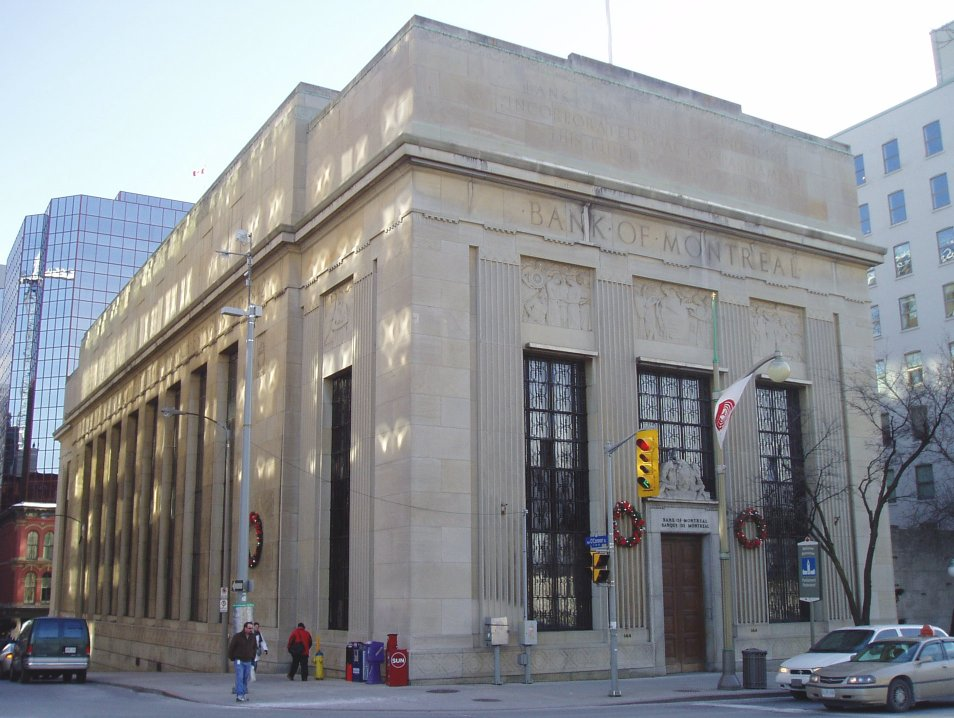
Former Bank of Montreal branch in Ottawa, now a historical building.

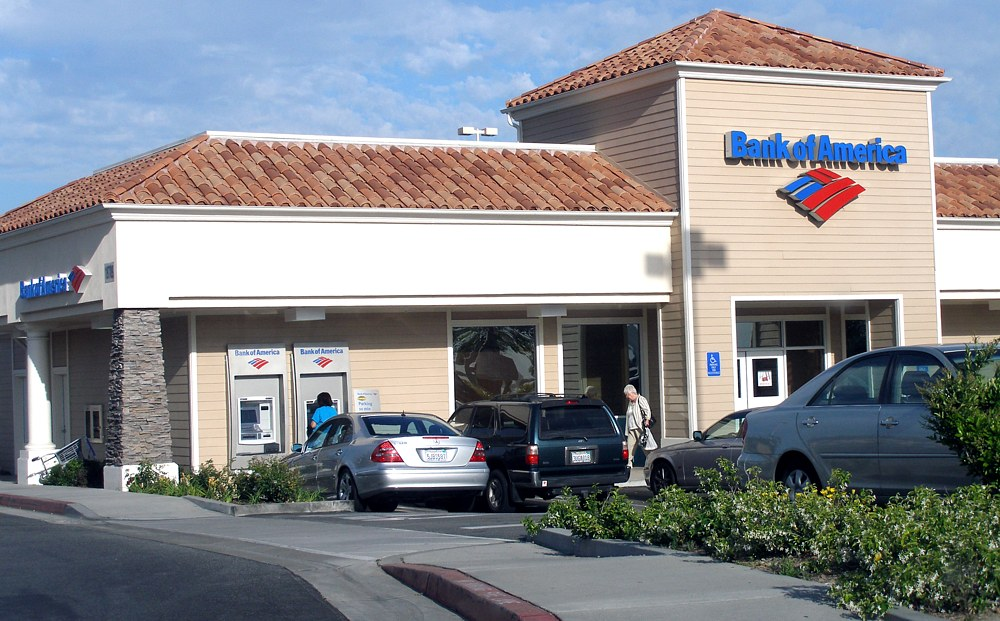
Current Bank of America branch in Porter Ranch, Los Angeles, California

A branch, banking center or financial center is a retail location where a bank, credit union, or other financial institution (including a brokerage firm) offers a wide array of face-to-face and automated services to its customers.

== History and description ==
During the 3rd century banks in Persia (now Iran) and in other territories started to issue letters of credit known as Sakks, basically checks in today’s language, that could be traded in cooperative houses or offices throughout the Persian territories. In the period from 1100-1300 banking started to expand across Europe and banks began opening ‘branches’ in remote, foreign locations to support international trade. In 1327, Avignon which is located in France had 43 branches of Italian banking houses alone.

In the USA, the practice of opening satellite branches was popularized in the early 20th century by Amadeo Giannini, then head of the Bank of America. Historically, branches were housed in imposing buildings, often in a neoclassical style of architecture. Today, branches may also take the form of smaller offices within a larger complex, such as a shopping mall.

Traditionally, the branch was the only place to access a financial institution's services. Services provided by a branch include cash withdrawals and deposits from a demand account with a bank teller, financial advice through a specialist, safe deposit box rentals, bureau de change, insurance sales (where it is allowed by law), etc. In the early 21st century, features such as automated teller machines (ATM), telephone and online banking, allowed customers to bank from remote locations and after business hours. This has caused financial institutions to reduce their branch business hours and merge smaller branches into larger ones. Conversely, they converted some into mini-branches with only ATMs for cash withdrawal and depositing; computer terminals for online banking and cheque depositing machines. Some mini-branches may have one or no human staff with only telephone support.

Some financial institutions, in an attempt to show a friendlier image, offer a boutique or coffeehouse-like environment in their branches, with sit-down counters, refreshments, interactive displays, music and play areas for children. Some branches also have drive-through teller windows or ATMs. Other financial institutions reduce their costs and position their offerings by having no branches and are sometimes known as virtuals or direct banks.

=== Legal restrictions in the United States ===
Historically, branch banking in the United States—especially interstate branch banking—was viewed unfavorably by regulatory authorities. This regulatory hostility was codified with the enactment of the McFadden Act of 1927, which specifically prohibited interstate banking. Over the next few decades, some banks attempted to circumvent McFadden's provisions by establishing bank holding companies that operated so-called independent banks in multiple states. To address this, The Bank Holding Company Act of 1956 prohibited bank holding companies headquartered in one state from having branches in any other state.

Most interstate banking prohibitions were repealed by the Riegle-Neal Interstate Banking and Branching Efficiency Act of 1994. Research has also found that anticompetitive state provisions restricted out-of-state growth when those provisions were more restrictive than the provisions set by the Interstate Banking and Branching Efficiency Act or by neighboring states. Some states have also had restrictive bank branch laws; for example, Illinois outlawed branches (other than the main office) until 1967, and did not allow an unlimited number until 1993. Texas has historically heavily restricted the operations of banks. Although Dallas-area Docutel was an early ATM manufacturer, the state's banks did not purchase them until Texas Attorney General Crawford Martin ruled in August 1971 that ATMs did not violate the Texas Constitution's prohibition on bank branches. In 1980 Article XVI, Section 16, of the constitution was amended to permit banks to have unmanned ATMs in the county of their domicile. The prohibition on bank branches existed until 1986.

== Types of branches ==
=== Instore ===
These are typically branches located in a retail space such as a grocery, shopping malls or discount store. They may be full-service branches or limited service branches. They generally do not include drive-through teller windows or safe deposit boxes. These branches may have limited staff and typically include technology as a means to deliver banking services such as automated teller machines, videoconferencing, and video banking systems.

=== Foreign bank branch ===
A type of foreign bank that is obligated to follow the regulations of both the home and host countries, operating in the country. regulated by the Office of the Superintendent of Financial Institutions.
