= Nepal Stock Exchange =

Nepalese stock exchange

- नेपाल स्टक एक्स्चेन्ज
- Type: Stock Exchange
- Location: Singha Durbar Plaza, Kathmandu, Nepal
- Coordinates: 27.698°N 85.32°E
- Founded: 13 January 1994; 32 years ago
- Owner: Nepal Government (58.66%); Nepal Rastra Bank (9.50%); Employees Provident Fund (10%); Other shareholders (21.84%)
- Key people: Mr. Amrit Lamsal (Chairman); Vacant (CEO)
- Currency: NPR
- No. of listings: 263 (March 2026)
- Market cap: रू465,698.5 crore (US$30 billion)
- Volume: 804,285,000 Units
- Indices: NEPSE Index
- Website: www.nepalstock.com

The Nepal Stock Exchange Limited (NEPSE) is the sole stock exchange of Nepal, headquartered in Singha Durbar Plaza, Kathmandu. Established on 13 January 1994, NEPSE facilitates the trading of government and corporate securities, aiming to provide liquidity and marketability through its regulated platform. As of July 2025, the Market Capitalization of the companies listed on NEPSE totaled रू465,698.5 crore (US$30 billion).

== History ==
The origins of Nepal’s Stock Security market trace back to 1976, when the Securities Exchange Center (SEC) was founded under the Companies Act, 1983. In 1993, the SEC was converted into NEPSE (Nepal Stock Exchange Limited) under the Securities Exchange Act of 1983, marking the formal beginning of secondary market operations in Nepal. NEPSE inaugurated its trading floor on 13 January 1994 (29 Poush 2050 BS).

== Ownership structure ==
As of 2025, NEPSE’s paid-up capital stands at NPR 1 billion(approximately US$7.35 million in March 2025). The ownership is distributed as follows:

| S.No | Owners | Ownership (%) |
|---|---|---|
| 1 | Government of Nepal | 58.66 |
| 2 | Nepal Rastra Bank | 9.50 |
| 3 | Employees Provident Fund | 10.00 |
| 4 | Rastriya Banijya Bank | 11.23 |
| 5 | Others | 10.60 |

== Market Overview ==
- Currency: Nepalese Rupee (NPR)
- Listed Companies: 284 (as of feb 2026)
- Listed Broker Companies: 101 (as of November 13)
- Market Capitalization: NPR 465,698.5 crore (approx. USD 34 billion)
- Trading Volume: Over 804 million units monthly
- Indices: NEPSE Index, Sensitive Index, Float Index, Sensitive Float Index

The NEPSE Index is the capitalization-weighted index of all stocks on the Nepal Stock Exchange, reflecting the large market capitalization of many Nepalese banks.The index is said to predominantly reflect the banking sector.

NEPSE categorizes all listed scripts into 16 distinct sectors, enabling clearer market segmentation and investor analysis. These sectors(Indices) are:

- Commercial Banks (BANKINGIND)
- Development Banks (DEVBANKIND)
- Finance Companies (FINANCEIND)
- Hydropower (HYDROPOWIND
- Investment (INVIDX)
- Insurance
  - Life Insurance (LIFEINSUIND)
  - Non Life Insurance (NONLIFEIND)
- Microfinance (MICROFININD)
- Mutual Funds (MUTUALIND)
- Manufacturing & Processing (MANUFACTUREIND)
- Hotel & Tourism (HOTELIND)
- Tradings (TRADINGIND)
- Others (OTHERSIND)
- Preference Share
- Promotor Shares (PROMOTER)
- Corporate Debenture (DEBENTURE)

== Regulatory Framework ==
NEPSE functions under the supervision of the Securities board of Nepal (SEBON), which regulates market activities under the Securities Act of 2006. Security Board Of Nepal (SEBON) oversees licensing, compliance, and investor protection.

== Trading Mechanism ==
NEPSE operates through a network of 92 registered brokers and 41 Remote Work Stations (RWS) across 21 cities. Investors can trade via broker websites or physical branches. The exchange uses an automated trading system or simply Trading Management System (TMS), and all listed securities are held in dematerialized (Demat) form.

Licensed Broker List
| Broker no. | Broker Name | Head Office | Branch Locations |
| 1 | Kumari Securities Pvt. Limited | Dillibazaar, Kathmandu | Pokhara |
| 3 | Arun Securities Pvt. Ltd. | Gaushala, Kathmandu | |
| 4 | Opal Securities Investment Pvt. Ltd. | Lazimpat, Kathmandu | |
| 5 | Market Securities Exchange Company Pvt. Ltd | Kichha Pokhari, Kathmandu | |
| 6 | Agrawal Securities Pvt. Ltd | Dillibazar, Kathmandu | Butwal, Biratnagar & Janakpur |
| 7 | J.F. Securities Company Pvt. Ltd | New Road, Kathmandu | Butwal. Damak, Tulsipur |
| 8 | Ashutosh Brokerage & Securities Pvt. Ltd | Battisputali, Kathmandu | Mirchiya & Itahari |
| 10 | Pragyan Securities Pvt. Ltd | Kamaladi, Kathmandu | Biratnagar |
| 11 | Malla & Malla Stock Broking Company Pvt. Ltd | Hattisar, Kathmandu | Illam & Phidim |
| 13 | Thrive Brokerage House Pvt. Ltd | Naxal, Kathmandu | Damauli & Pokhara |
| 14 | Nepal Stock House Pvt. Ltd | Kalikasthan, Kathmandu | Tikapur & Battar |
| 16 | Primo Securities Pvt. Ltd | Putalisadak, Kathmandu. | Narayanghat & Birgunj |
| 17 | ABC Securities Pvt. Ltd | Indrachowk, Kathmandu | Dharan |
| 18 | Sagarmatha Securities Pvt. Ltd | Dillibazar, Kathmandu | |
| 19 | Nepal Investment & Securities Trading Pvt. Ltd | Purano Baneshwor, Kathmandu | Biratnagar |
| 20 | Sipla Securities Pvt. Ltd | Gyaneshwor, Kathmandu | |
| 21 | Midas Stock Broking Company Pvt. Ltd | Kamaladi, Kathmandu | Gorkha & Butwal |
| 22 | Siprabi Securities Pvt. Ltd | Pulchowk, Lalitpur | Birgunj |
| 25 | Sweta Securities Pvt. Ltd | Putalisadak, Kathmandu | |
| 26 | Asian Securities Pvt. Ltd | Putalisadak, Kathmandu | Butwal |
| 28 | Shree Krishna Securities Ltd | Dillibazar, Kathmandu | Biratnagar |
| 29 | Trishul Securities And Investment Ltd | Putalisadak, Kathmandu | Narayanghat & Kawasoti |
| 32 | Premier Securities Company Ltd | Putalisadak, Kathmandu | Pokhara & Waling |
| 33 | Dakshinkali Investment Securities Pvt.Ltd | Kamaladi, Kathmandu | Butwal |
| 34 | Vision Securities Pvt. Ltd | Anamnagar, Kathmandu | Chandrauta, Bhairahawa, Damauli, Gatthaghar, Kumaripati, Pokhara, Illam, Beni, Kawasoti, Banepa & Dhangadi |
| 35 | Kohinoor Investment and Securities Pvt.Ltd | Hattisar Sadak, Kathmandu | Pokhara |
| 36 | Secured Securities Ltd | Pradarshani Marga, Kathmandu | Damak & Birtamode |
| 37 | Swarnalaxmi Securities Pvt.Ltd | Putalisadak, Kathmandu | Hetauda |
| 38 | Dipshika Dhitopatra Karobar Company Pvt. Ltd | Anamnagar, Kathmandu | Tandi, Charikot, Mahendranagar, Lahan, Lamki & Dhangadi |
| 39 | Sumeru Securities Pvt.Ltd | Gyaneshwor, Kathmandu | Pokhara & Birtamode |
| 40 | Creative Securities Pvt.Ltd | Kamalpokhari, Kathmandu | Banepa & Tansen |
| 41 | Linch Stock Market Ltd | New Baneshwor, Kathmandu | Butwal |
| 42 | Sani Securities Company Ltd^ | Naxal, Kathmandu | Pokhara, Daldale, Narayanghat |
| 43 | South Asian Bulls Pvt. Ltd | Kuleshwor, Kathmandu | Birtamod |
| 44 | Dynamic Money Managers Securities Pvt. Ltd | Kamalpokhari, Kathmandu | Banepa & Narayanghat |
| 45 | Imperial Securities Co .Pvt. Ltd | Anamnagar, Kathmandu | Nepalganj, Surkhet, Bhaktapur & Dhading |
| 46 | Kalika Securities Pvt. Ltd | Anamnagar, Kathmandu, Nepal | Bardibas, Butwal, Nepalgunj |
| 47 | Neev Securities Pvt. Ltd | Putalisadak, Kathmandu | Itahari & Hariwan |
| 48 | Trishakti Securities Public Ltd | Putalisadak, Kathmandu | Pokhara & Mahendranagar |
| 49 | Online Securities Limited | Putalisadak, Kathmandu | Battar & Dharan |
| 50 | Cristal Kanchenjunga Securities Pvt.Ltd | New Plaza, Kathmandu | Biratnagar |
| 51 | Oxford Securities Pvt.Ltd | Kalimati, Kathmandu | Bhumahi & Narayanghat |
| 52 | Sundhara Securities Ltd | Sundhara, Kathmandu | Simara, Besisahar & Khairhani |
| 53 | Investment Management Nepal Pvt. Ltd. | Tripureshwor, Kathmandu | Pokhara |
| 54 | Sewa Securities Pvt. Ltd. | Tripureshwor, Kathmandu | Hetauda |
| 55 | Bhrikuti Stock Broking Co. Pvt. Ltd. | New Road, Kathmandu | Birgung, Charikot, Bardibas, Ithari, Surkhet, Dhulikhel & Beni |
| 56 | Sri Hari Securities Pvt.Ltd | Kamaladi, Kathmandu | Birtamod |
| 57 | Aryatara Investment And Securities Pvt. Ltd. | Anamnagar, Kathmandu | Ghorahi, Butwal, Tansen, Bhaktapur, Bhairahawa |
| 58 | Naasa Securities Company Ltd | Lal Colony Marga, Kathmandu | Pokhara, Birgunj, Janakpur |
| 59 | Deevyaa Securities & Stock House Pvt. Ltd | Putalisadak, Kathmandu | Kusma & Baglung bazar |
| 60 | Nagarik Stock Dealer Ltd* | New Baneshwor, Kathmandu | |
| 61 | BHOLE GANESH SECURITIES Ltd | Anamnagar, Kathmandu | |
| 62 | Capital Max Securities Ltd | Kamalpokhari, Kathmandu, Nepal | |
| 63 | Himalayan Brokerage Company Ltd | Dillibazar, Kathmandu | |
| 64 | SUN SECURITIES PVT LTD | Naxal, Kathmandu | |
| 65 | Sharepro Securities Private Ltd | Dhalko, Kathmandu | |
| 66 | Miyo Securities Pvt Ltd | Hattisar, Kathmandu | |
| 67 | Property Wizard Ltd | Naxal, Kathmandu | |
| 68 | Elite Stock House Ltd | Lazimpat, Kathmandu | |
| 69 | INDEX SECURITIES Ltd | Dillibazar Kathmandu | |
| 70 | Infinity Securities Ltd | Sundhara, Kathmandu | |
| 71 | SHUBHAKAMANA SECURITIES PVT. LTD | Naxal, Kathmandu | |
| 72 | Hatemalo Financial Services Private Ltd | Narayanchour, Naxal, Kathmandu | |
| 73 | Money World Share Exchange PVT Ltd | Putalisadak, Kathmandu | |
| 74 | Kalash Stock Market Pvt. Ltd | Buddhanagar, Kathmandu | |
| 75 | NIMB Stock Markets Ltd^ | Tripureshwor, Kathmandu | |
| 76 | Machhapuchchhre Securities Ltd | Jamal, Kathmandu | |
| 77 | Nabil Stock Dealer Ltd* | Durbarmarga, Kathmandu | |
| 78 | Garima Securities Ltd | Kamalpokhari, Kathmandu | |
| 79 | Pahi investment | Gokarneshwor, Kathmandu | |
| 80 | Indira Securities Pvt. Ltd | Tripureshwor, Kathmandu | |
| 81 | Aakashbhairab Securities Ltd. | Bhanimandal, Lalitpur | |
| 82 | N.M.B. Securities Ltd | Naxal, Kathmandu | |
| 83 | Sanima Securities Ltd | Putalisadak, Kathmandu | |
| 84 | Milkyway Share Broker Company Ltd. | Maharajgunj, Kathmandu | |
| 85 | Capital Hub Pvt. Ltd | Anamnagar, Kathmandu | |
| 86 | Stoxkarts Securities Ltd | Dillibazar, Kathmandu | |
| 87 | S.P.S.A. Securities Ltd | Sankhamukl, Kathmandu | |
| 88 | Blue Chip Securities Ltd | Marajgunj, Kathmandu | |
| 89 | J.B.N.L Securities Ltd. | New Baneshwor, Kathmandu | |
| 90 | Sajilo Broker Ltd | Jhamsikhel, Lalitpur | |
| 91 | CBIL Securities Ltd. | Kupondole, Lalitpur | |
| 92 | Roadshow Securities Ltd | Sundhara, Kathmandu | |
| 93 | Beni Securities Pvt. Ltd. | Mid Baneshwor, Kathmandu | |
| 94 | K.B.L. Securities Ltd | Gairidhara, Kathmandu | |
| 95 | Magnet Securities & Investment Company Pvt. Ltd | Bijulibazar, Kathmandu | |
| 96 | Himalayan Securities Ltd | Kamalpokhari, Kathmandu | |
| 97 | RBB Securities Company Ltd | Jamal, Kathmandu | |
| 98 | Trademow Securities Private Ltd | Dhumbarahi, Kathmandu | |
| 99 | Prabhu Stock Market Limited | Buddhanagar, Kathmandu | |
| 100 | Sunrise Securities Limited | Hattisar, Kathmandu | |
| 101 | Apple Securities Private Ltd | Naxal, Kathmandu | |

== NEPSE's Top 10 Largest Stocks ==
Source: Nepal Stock Exchange (market values in NPR/Nepalese Rupee). Data arranged by market value. Updated on May 27, 2025.

1. Bishal Bazar (225.4 billion)
2. Nepal Reinsurance Company Limited (170.5 billion)
3. Nepal Telecom (158.3 billion)
4. Nabil Bank (134.7 billion)
5. Citizen Investment Trust (124.4 billion)
6. Himalayan Reinsurance Limited (101.7 billion)
7. Global IME Bank Limited (89.59 billion)
8. Everest Bank (84.2 billion)
9. Nepal Investment Mega Bank Limited (73.9 billion)
10. Hydroelectricity Investment and Development Company Limited (72.4 billion)

== See also ==
- Securities board of Nepal
- Nepal Rastra Bank
- CDS and Clearing Limited (CDSC)
