= Nepalese 2-rupee coin =

Two Rupees दुई रुपैयाँ
- Nepal
- Value: रू 2
- Mass: 5.0 g
- Diameter: 25 mm
- Thickness: 1.6 mm
- Composition: Brass-plated steel
- Years of minting: 1949 - 2008 (Monarch issue); 2008 - present (Republic issue)

Obverse
- Design: Janaki Mandir of Janakpurdham.
- Designer: Nepal Rastra Bank
- Design date: 2020; 6 years ago

Reverse
- Design: Map of Nepal
- Designer: Nepal Rastra Bank
- Design date: 2020; 6 years ago

The Nepalese two-rupee coin (रु 2) is a low-denomination coin of the Nepalese rupee, primarily used for small transactions or as change in Nepal. Introduced to gradually replace the two-rupee banknote, the coin features national symbols and cultural motifs.

While its use in daily transactions is limited due to its low value, the Rs. 2 coin remains an official part of Nepal's currency system.
