= Nepalese five hundred-rupee note =

Five Hundred Rupees पाँच सय रुपैयाँ
- Country: Nepal
- Value: रू 500 (pegged at ₹ 312.70)
- Width: 160 mm
- Height: 70 mm
- Security features: Security thread, micro-lettering, watermark, intaglio (raised) printing, latent image, see-through registration device, fluorescent ink (UV feature).
- Material used: Cotton Paper
- Years of printing: 2008 – present

Obverse
- Design: Mount Everest(Sagarmatha); Mount Ama Dablam; Tengboche Monastery; Lord Indra.
- Designer: Nepal Rastra Bank
- Design date: 2008; 18 years ago

Reverse
- Design: The Bengal Tiger.
- Designer: Nepal Rastra Bank
- Design date: 2008; 18 years ago

The Nepalese five-hundred-rupee banknote (रु 500) is a high-value denomination of the Nepalese rupee. It is currently in circulation and commonly used for significant transactions throughout Nepal.

The note was first issued during the monarchy and featured the portrait of the king. Following the abolition of the monarchy in 2008, the Nepal Rastra Bank introduced a new series, replacing the royal portrait with images showcasing Nepal's natural landscapes and cultural heritage.
