= Ashurly =

Ashurly (Azerbaijani: Aşurlı) is an Azerbaijani surname. Notable people with the surname include:

- Israfil Ashurly (born 1969), Azerbaijani mountaineer
- Murad Ashurly (1972–2014), Azerbaijani mountaineer, cousin of Israfil

== See also ==
- Ashur (disambiguation)
