= Nepalese five-rupee note =

Five Rupees पाँच रुपैयाँ
- Country: Nepal
- Value: रू 5 (pegged at ₹ 3.12)
- Width: 114 mm
- Height: 62 mm
- Security features: Security thread, micro-lettering, watermark, intaglio (raised) printing, fluorescent ink (UV feature).
- Material used: Cotton Paper
- Years of printing: 2008 – present

Obverse
- Design: Mount Everest(Sagarmatha); and a temple structure (either Kasthamandap or Taleju Mandir, depending on the issue).
- Designer: Nepal Rastra Bank
- Design date: 2008; 18 years ago

Reverse
- Design: Yak(s) grazing
- Designer: Nepal Rastra Bank
- Design date: 2008; 18 years ago

The Nepalese five-rupee banknote (रु 5) is one of the lower denominations of the Nepalese rupee. The note is currently in circulation and is used for small-value transactions throughout Nepal.

The denomination was first introduced during the monarchy of Nepal and featured portraits of the King. Following the abolition of the monarchy in 2008, the Nepal Rastra Bank introduced a new series replacing the royal portrait with national symbols and cultural motifs.
