= Nepalese 10-rupee coin =

Ten Rupees दश रुपैयाँ
- Nepal
- Value: रू 10
- Mass: 8.0 g
- Diameter: 29 mm
- Composition: Brass-plated steel

Obverse
- Design: Shree Pach Birendra Bir Bikram Shah Dev

Reverse
- Design: Constitution of the Kingdom of Nepal, 2047 B.S.

The Nepalese ten-rupee coin (रु 10) was a circulating denomination of the Nepalese rupee and was widely used for everyday transactions across Nepal. It was one of the higher-value coins in circulation before the wider introduction of banknotes of the same denomination.

As paper currency became more practical for frequent use, the ten-rupee banknote was later introduced as a replacement for the coin. Over time, the minting of the Rs. 10 coin was officially discontinued, though existing coins continued to circulate for some time.
