= Banking in Nepal =

Banking in Nepal began with the establishment of Nepal Bank Limited in 1937, marking the country's first formal financial institution. The sector gained momentum with the founding of the Nepal Rastra Bank (NRB) in 1956, which became the central regulatory authority. Over the decades, Nepal transitioned from a state-dominated banking model to a liberalized, competitive financial ecosystem.

== Regulatory Framework ==
The banking system is governed by the Nepal Rastra Bank Act, Bank and Financial Institutions Act (BAFIA), and various NRB directives. NRB classifies financial institutions into four categories:

Class	Type	Description
A	Commercial Banks	Full-service banks with national reach
B	Development Banks	Focused on regional development financin
C	Finance Companies	Provide hire purchase, leasing, etc.
D	Microfinance Institution	Target low-income and rural populations

== Current Status ==
As of Mid-July 2025

According to NRB reports:

Banks/BFIs Class	No. of BFIs	No. of Branches
Commercial Banks (A)	20	5,099
Development Banks (B)	17	1,132
Finance (C)	17	291
Microfinance (D)	54	6,522
Infrastructure Development Bank	1	-
Total	109	13,044

Deposit Accounts: 5.91 crore (exceeding Nepal's population of ~3 crore)

== See also ==
- History of banking
- Nepal Rastra Bank
- Nepalese Rupee
- List of banks in Nepal
- Commercial banks of Nepal
