= Vidushi Rana =

Nepalese entrepreneur and politician

Honourable Vidushi Rana
- विधुशी राणा

Member of Parliament for Rastriya Swatantra Party
- Incumbent
- Assumed office 2026

Personal details
- Party: Rastriya Swatantra Party
- Spouse: Amir Pratap JB Rana
- Children: 2

Vidushi Rana (Note: Nepali: विधुशी राणा) is a Nepalese business executive and politician. She is the executive director of Goldstar Stride Limited, a Kathmandu-based footwear manufacturer, and since 2026 has served as a Member of the House of Representatives of Nepal, representing the Rastriya Swatantra Party under the Khas Arya proportional quota.

Before entering politics, Rana worked in Nepal's banking sector and served as Honorary Consul General of the Republic of Iceland to Nepal.

== Business career ==
Rana is the executive director of Goldstar Stride Limited, one of Nepal's larger domestic footwear manufacturers, based in Kathmandu.Rana is the executive director of Goldstar Stride Limited, one of Nepal's larger domestic footwear manufacturers. Before joining Goldstar she worked in Nepal's banking sector.In public interviews she has described her industrial-sector experience as shaping her views on Nepal's manufacturing policy, private-sector constraints and export environment.

== Political career ==
=== Appointment to parliament ===
In 2026, Rana was appointed to Nepal's House of Representatives as a representative of the Rastriya Swatantra Party through the Khas Arya proportional quota.She joined parliament as a member of the party's proportional-representation contingent rather than as a directly elected constituency member.

=== Parliamentary priorities ===
Rana has stated that she intends to use her parliamentary role to focus on industrial policy, domestic manufacturing, export growth and private-sector concerns, drawing on her background in the footwear industry.In public interviews she has said her experience of the challenges faced by the Nepali private sector will inform her legislative work.
