= Nepalese twenty-rupee note =

Twenty Rupees बीस रुपैयाँ
- Country: Nepal
- Value: रू 20 (pegged at ₹ 12.50)
- Width: 138 mm
- Height: 70 mm
- Security features: Security thread, micro-lettering, watermark, intaglio (raised) printing, latent image, see-through registration device, fluorescent ink (UV feature).
- Material used: Cotton Paper
- Years of printing: 2008 – present

Obverse
- Design: Mount Everest(Sagarmatha); Krishna Mandir of Patan Durbar Square; Garuda atop a pillar.
- Designer: Nepal Rastra Bank
- Design date: 2008; 18 years ago

Reverse
- Design: Two or one (depending on the issue) Swamp deer(Barasingha) grazing
- Designer: Nepal Rastra Bank
- Design date: 2008; 18 years ago

The Nepalese twenty-rupee banknote (रु 20) is a commonly used denomination of the Nepalese rupee. It remains in circulation and facilitates everyday transactions across Nepal.

Originally issued during the monarchy, the note displayed portraits of the King. After the monarchy ended in 2008, the Nepal Rastra Bank launched a new series, replacing the royal imagery with depictions of Nepal's natural beauty and cultural heritage.
