= Nepalese 1-rupee coin =

One Rupee एक रुपैयाँ
- Nepal
- Value: रू 1
- Mass: 4.0 g
- Diameter: 20 mm (0.79 in)
- Composition: Nickel-plated steel
- Years of minting: 1949 - 2008 (Monarch issue); 2008 - present (Republic issue)

Obverse
- Design: Sagarmatha (Mount Everest)
- Designer: Nepal Rastra Bank
- Design date: 2008; 18 years ago

Reverse
- Design: Map of Nepal
- Designer: Nepal Rastra Bank
- Design date: 2020; 6 years ago

The Nepalese one-rupee coin (रु 1) is the lowest denomination of the Nepalese rupee and is primarily used for very small transactions or as change in Nepal. Introduced to replace the one-rupee banknote, the coin features national symbols and cultural motifs.

Although its everyday use has declined, the Re. 1 coin remains an official part of Nepal's currency system.
