= Vaisha Dev Shrine =

Religious structure in Nepal

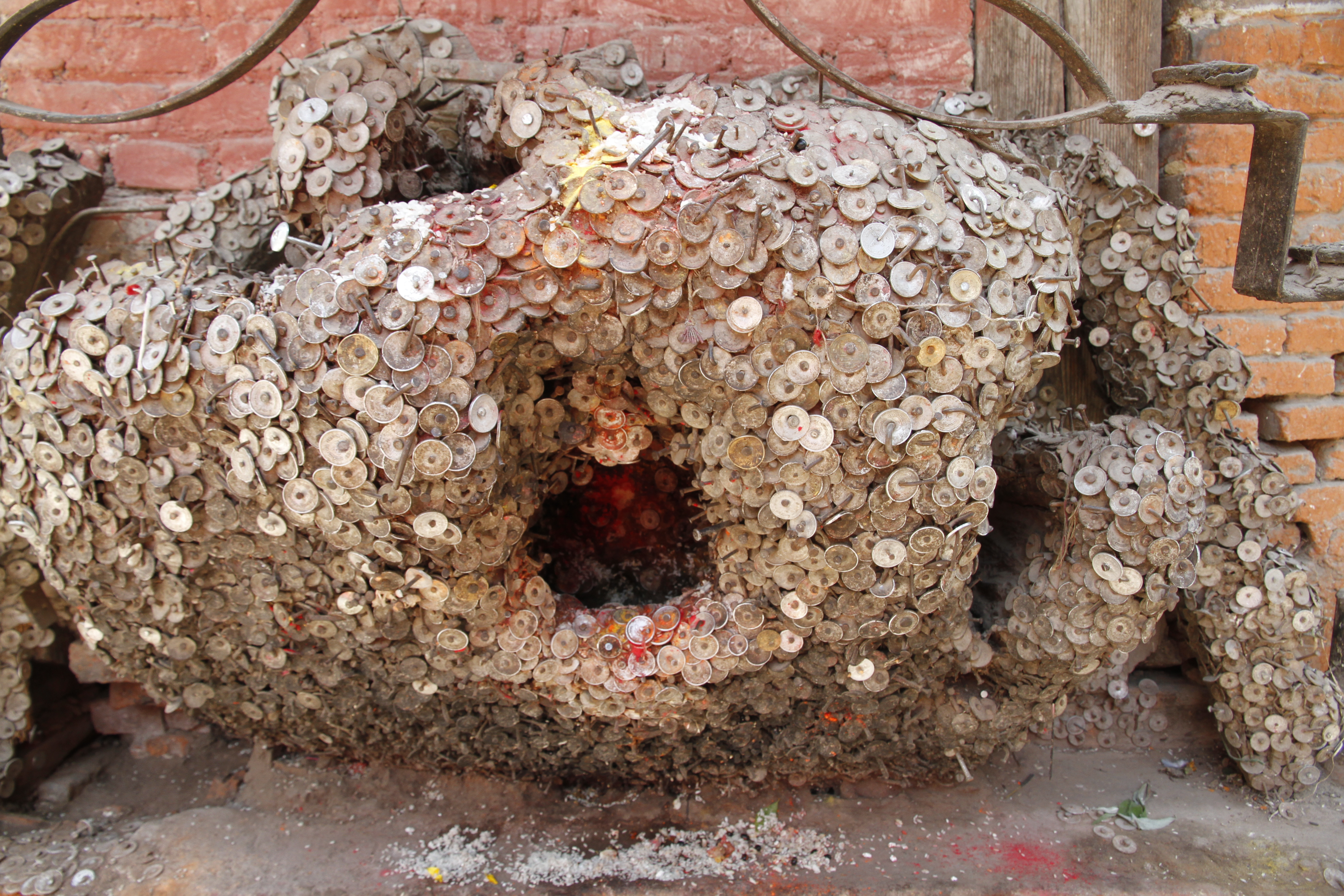

Religion
- Deity: Vaisha Dev

Location
- Location: Kathmandu
- Country: Nepal
- Interactive map of Vaisha Dev Shrine
- Coordinates: 27.7000°N 85.3333°E

The Vaisha Dev Shrine, also known as Toothache tree, is a wooden log at Bangemudha, Kathmandu.

== Background ==
The shrine is dedicated to goddess Vaisha Dev who is a Newar's patron saint of toothache. People suffering from toothache visit the shrine to nail Nepalese rupee coins believing in that it will get rid of the toothache. The log contains thousands of coins nailed into it. It attracts many people who have toothache due to this dentist's have opened shop near the shrine. There are also "healers" who claim to cure them by offering them money, or other gifts including fruits.
