= Nepalese fifty-rupee note =

Fifty Rupees पचास रुपैयाँ
- Country: Nepal
- Value: रू 50 (approx. ₹ 31.23(pegged))
- Width: 142 mm
- Height: 70 mm
- Security features: Security thread, micro-lettering, watermark, intaglio (raised) printing, latent image, see-through registration device, fluorescent ink (UV feature).
- Material used: Cotton Paper
- Years of printing: 2008 – present

Obverse
- Design: Mount Everest(Sagarmatha); Janaki Mandir of Janakpurdham.
- Designer: Nepal Rastra Bank
- Design date: 2008; 18 years ago

Reverse
- Design: Snow Leopard
- Designer: Nepal Rastra Bank
- Design date: 2016; 10 years ago

The Nepalese fifty-rupee banknote (रु 50) is a mid-range denomination of the Nepalese rupee. It is currently in circulation and widely used for everyday transactions throughout Nepal.

The note was first issued during the monarchy and featured the portrait of the King. Following the abolition of the monarchy in 2008, the Nepal Rastra Bank introduced a new series, replacing the royal portrait with images highlighting Nepal’s rich cultural heritage and scenic landscapes.
