= Biswo Nath Poudel =

Nepali economist and 18th Governor of Nepal Rastra Bank

18th Governor of Nepal Rastra Bank
- Incumbent
- Assumed office 20 May 2025
- Preceded by: Maha Prasad Adhikari

Personal details
- Spouse: Pratibha Sharma
- Education: Ph.D., University of California, Berkeley
- Occupation: Economist, Professor

Biswo Nath Poudel (Note: Nepali: विश्वनाथ पौडेल) is a Nepali economist and academician who is serving as the 18th Governor of the Nepal Rastra Bank since 20 May 2025. He was appointed by the Government of Nepal following a recommendation from the Governor-Selection Committee.

== Early life and education ==
Poudel completed his Ph.D. in Agricultural and Resource Economics from the University of California, Berkeley in 2010.

== Career ==
Before his appointment as governor, he served as Vice Chairperson of the National Planning Commission (Nepal) and Senior Economic Advisor at the Ministry of Finance of Nepal and Professor at Kathmandu University. He also worked as an economic advisor at the International Labour Organization and as an economist at the Office of Millennium Challenge Account Nepal.

== See also ==
- Kathmandu University
- National Planning Commission (Nepal)
