= Nepalese hundred-rupee note =

One Hundred Rupees एक सय रुपैयाँ
- Country: Nepal
- Value: रू 100 (pegged at ₹ 62.44)
- Width: 146 mm
- Height: 70 mm
- Security features: Security thread, micro-lettering, watermark, intaglio (raised) printing, latent image, see-through registration device, fluorescent ink (UV feature).
- Material used: Cotton Paper
- Years of printing: 2008 – present

Obverse
- Design: Mount Everest(Sagarmatha); detailed map of Nepal; Ashoka Pillar with inscription: LUMBINI THE BIRTHPLACE OF LORD BUDDHA.
- Designer: Nepal Rastra Bank
- Design date: 2008; 18 years ago (updated in 2025)

Reverse
- Design: A one-horned Rhinoceros and it's calf grazing in a grassy field.
- Designer: Nepal Rastra Bank
- Design date: 2008; 18 years ago

The Nepalese one-hundred-rupee banknote (रु 100) is a frequently used denomination of the Nepalese rupee. It is currently in circulation and commonly used for everyday and moderate-value transactions throughout Nepal.

Originally issued during the monarchy, the note featured the portrait of the king. After the monarchy was abolished in 2008, the Nepal Rastra Bank released a new series, replacing the royal portrait with imagery representing Nepal's natural beauty and cultural landmarks.
