= Banknotes of the Nepalese rupee =

Between 1945 and 2007, Nepali banknotes of Nepalese rupee were issued with the portraits of four different kings. Starting in October 2007 the king’s portrait was replaced by Mount Everest on all notes which have been issued since.

== 1945 - 1955 ==
The early banknotes which were issued between 1945 and 1955 during the rule of King Tribhuvan were not put into circulation by a Central Bank which did not exist in Nepal at that time. The issuing authority was the treasury which had the name Sadar Muluki Khana. Therefore, the notes of king Tribhuvan were not signed by a bank governor, but by a Kajanchi (head of the treasury) who was a high Hindu priest in the same time. Nepal’s early paper currency probably includes the only notes of the world which were signed by a high priest. These early notes were printed by the Indian Security Press in Nashik and do not have any security features, except for the water marks and the special paper on which they are printed.

== 1955 - 1972 ==
Starting with King Mahendra who succeeded to his father Tribhuvan in 1955, the banknotes were issued by Nepal Rastra Bank (Nepal National Bank) which was founded in April 1956. The signature of the governors of this institution is found on the banknotes which were issued after this date. Under king Mahendra the Nepali Government became “His Majesty’s Government” (expressed by "shri 5 ko sarakar" which literally means “the government of the five times honoured”) and remained this way during the rule of Birendra and Gyanendra. Two series of banknotes were issued during the rule of king Mahendra: The first series shows the king in civilian clothes wearing the Nepali “topi” while on the notes of the second series the king is shown in military uniform. The second series comprised for the first time notes of the high value of 500 and 1000 rupees.

== 1972 - 2001 ==
During King Birendra’s rule one can also distinguish between two major series of banknotes. The first series features the king wearing military uniform while on the notes of the second series the king is wearing the traditional Nepali crown adorned with feathers of the bird of paradise. During this period regular banknotes of 2 and 20 rupees and special banknotes of 25 and 250 rupees were issued for the first time.

2002 (King Birendra) series
Image		Value	Main Colour	Description		Date of issue
Obverse	Reverse	Value	Main Colour	Obverse	Reverse	Date of issue
		1 rupee	Blue-Purple	King Birendra with plumed crown, Pashupatinath Temple	Pair of Kasturi Mirga, Mount Ama Dablam in background	1981
For table standards, see the banknote specification table.

== 2001 - 2007 ==
The banknotes issued during this period have the same basic design as those of King Birendra whose portrait was simply replaced by that of his younger brother and successor Gyanendra. The low values of 1 and 2 rupees, and the special values of 25 and 250 rupees were not issued any more.

The legends found on the last issues of Gyanendra revert to Nepal sarkar (“Nepali Government”), thus omitting the reference to the king.

2002 (King Gyanendra) series
Image		Value	Main Colour	Description		Date of issue
Obverse	Reverse	Value	Main Colour	Obverse	Reverse	Date of issue
		5 rupees	Pink	King Gyanendra with plumed crown, Goddess Taleju Temple	Pair of Yaks, Mount Everest in background	2002, 2005
		10 rupees	Golden brown	King Gyanendra with plumed crown, image of Lord Changunarayan (a form of an appearance of Vishnu) on Garuda	Black bucks	2002, 2005
		20 rupees	orange, gold	King Gyanendra with plumed crown, Lord Krishna in Lalitpur	swamp deer	2002, 2005
		50 rupees	Blue	King Gyanendra with plumed crown, Ram Janaki Temple in Janakpur	Thar	2002, 2005
		50 rupees	Green, red	King Gyanendra in Nepalese national dress, Nepal Rashtra Bank head office, bank golden jubilee logo, Mount Machhapuchchre, Ashoka Pillar in Lumbini	Mount Ama Dablam, pair of danphe	2006
		100 rupees	Green	King Gyanendra with plumed crown; Mounts Nuptse, Everest and Lhotse; Nyatapola Temple in Bhaktapur	Rhinoceros	2002
		500 rupees	Brown	King Gyanendra with plumed crown, Mount Ama Dablam, Thyangboche monastery	Pair of tigers	2003
		1,000 rupees	Blue, Red and Gray	King Gyanendra with plumed crown, Swayambhunath and Harati Temples in Kathmandu	Elephants	2003
For table standards, see the banknote specification table.

== 2007/2008 ==
In October 2007, a 500 rupee note was issued on which the king’s portrait was replaced by and image of Mount Everest. This reflects the historical change from kingdom to republic which took place in May 2008 in Nepal. Further notes of 5, 10, 20, 50, 100 and 1,000 rupees with Mount Everest and without references to the king in their legends followed in 2008. The first issues of the 500 and 1000 rupees notes were printed on paper which still had the king's crowned portrait as a watermark in the "window" on the right part of the face of the notes. It was decided to print a red Rhododendron flower (Nepal's national flower) on top of the watermark. Notes of these denominations which were issued in 2009 and thereafter are printed on paper which has a rhododendron flower as watermark instead of the royal portrait and were therefore released without the additional overprint in red.

2007 (Mount Everest) series
Image		Value	Main Colour	Description		Date of issue
Obverse	Reverse	Value	Main Colour	Obverse	Reverse	Date of issue
		5 rupees	Pink	Mount Everest, Goddess Taleju Temple	Pair of Yaks, Mount Everest in background	2008
		10 rupees	Golden brown	Mount Everest, image of Lord Changunarayan (a form of an appearance of Vishnu) on Garuda	Black bucks	2008
		20 rupees	orange, gold	Mount Everest, Lord Krishna in Lalitpur	swamp deer	2008
		50 rupees	Blue	Mount Everest, Ram Janaki Temple in Janakpur	Thar	2008
		100 rupees	Green	Mount Everest; Mounts Nuptse, Everest and Lhotse; Nyatapola Temple in Bhaktapur	Rhinoceros	2008
		500 rupees	brown	Mount Everest left, Mount Ama Dablam and Thyangboche monastery centre background, rhododendron over watermark	Pair of tigers	2007
		1,000 rupees	Blue, Red and Gray	Mount Everest, Swayambhunath and Harati Temples in Kathmandu	Elephants	2008
For table standards, see the banknote specification table.

== 2012-2019 ==
In 2012, Nepal Rastra Bank issued a revised banknote series that are similar to the 2007 series, but now include inscriptions in English and the date of issue on the back.

2012-2019 (Mount Everest) series
Image		Value	Main Colour	Description		Date of issue
Obverse	Reverse	Value	Main Colour	Obverse	Reverse	Date of issue
		5 Rupees	Lilac, brown and green	Mount Everest; temple of Taleju; obverse of coin	Two yaks grazing; Mount Everest	2012
		5 Rupees	Lilac, brown and green	Mount Everest; Kasthamandap Temple	Yak	2017
		10 Rupees	Brown, green and lilac	Mount Everest; Garud Narayan of Changu Narayan temple	Three black bucks grazing; trees; bank logo	2012
		10 Rupees	Brown, green and lilac	Mount Everest; Garud Narayan of Changu Narayan temple	Antelope; bank logo	2017
		20 Rupees	Orange and Brown	Mount Everest; temple of god Krishna of Patan; Garuda atop pillar	Swamp deer; trees; mountain; bank logo	2012
		20 Rupees	Brown, green and lilac	Mount Everest; Garud Narayan of Changu Narayan temple	Sambar deer; trees; bank logo	2016
		50 Rupees	Purple, Green and Blue	Mount Everest; Rama-Janaki temple of Janakpur	Male thar; mountains; bank logo	2012
		50 Rupees	Purple, Green and Blue	Mount Everest; Rama-Janaki temple of Janakpur	Snow leopard	2015
		100 Rupees	Green and Lilac	Mount Everest; Mayadevi inside silver metallic oval; map of Nepal; Ashoka pillar; wood carvings from temple of Taleju in Kathmandu; description "Lumbini - The Birthplace of Lord Buddha"	One-horned rhinoceros in grassy plain; bank logo	2012
		100 Rupees	Green and Lilac	Mount Everest; Mayadevi inside silver metallic oval; map of Nepal; Ashoka pillar; wood carvings from temple of Taleju in Kathmandu; description "Lumbini - The Birthplace of Lord Buddha"	One-horned rhinoceros and its offspring in grassy plain; bank logo	2015
		500 Rupees	Brown and violet	Mount Everest; god Indra; Mount Amadablam and Thyangboche monastery; wood carvings; clouds	Two tigers drinking melted snow	2012
		500 Rupees	Brown and violet	Mount Everest; god Indra; Mount Amadablam and Thyangboche monastery; wood carvings; clouds	Tiger	2016
		1,000 Rupees	Blue and gray	Mount Everest, Swayambhunath stupa & Harati temple	Elephant	2013
		1,000 Rupees	Blue, Red and Gray	Mount Everest, Swayambhunath stupa & Harati temple	Twin Asian Elephants	2019
For table standards, see the banknote specification table.

== Currency unit ==
The currency unit of the Tribhuvan and early Mahendra notes was the mohar (spelt moru on the banknotes), which originally was a silver coin which weighed about 5.4 grams and represented about half an Indian Rupee. The later notes of Mahendra and the issues of the subsequent rulers Birendra and Gyanendra were issued with the denomination rupee (spelt rupaya[n] on the notes).

== Printers ==
The banknotes with the portrait of The King Tribhuvan were printed in Nashik (India). The later issues were supplied by firms such as De La Rue and Giesecke & Devrient.

== See also ==
- Nepalese rupee
- Mohar
