= Chankheli Peak =

Mountain in Nepal

Chankheli Peak is a 4210 m-high mountain located in Humla district, Karnali Province of Nepal. The mountain is sometimes mistakenly believed to be featured on the Nepalese one rupee bank note because of its resemblance to Mount Ama Dablam, the actual mountain depicted on the note.
