= Ama Dablam =

Mountain in Nepal

- अमा दब्लम
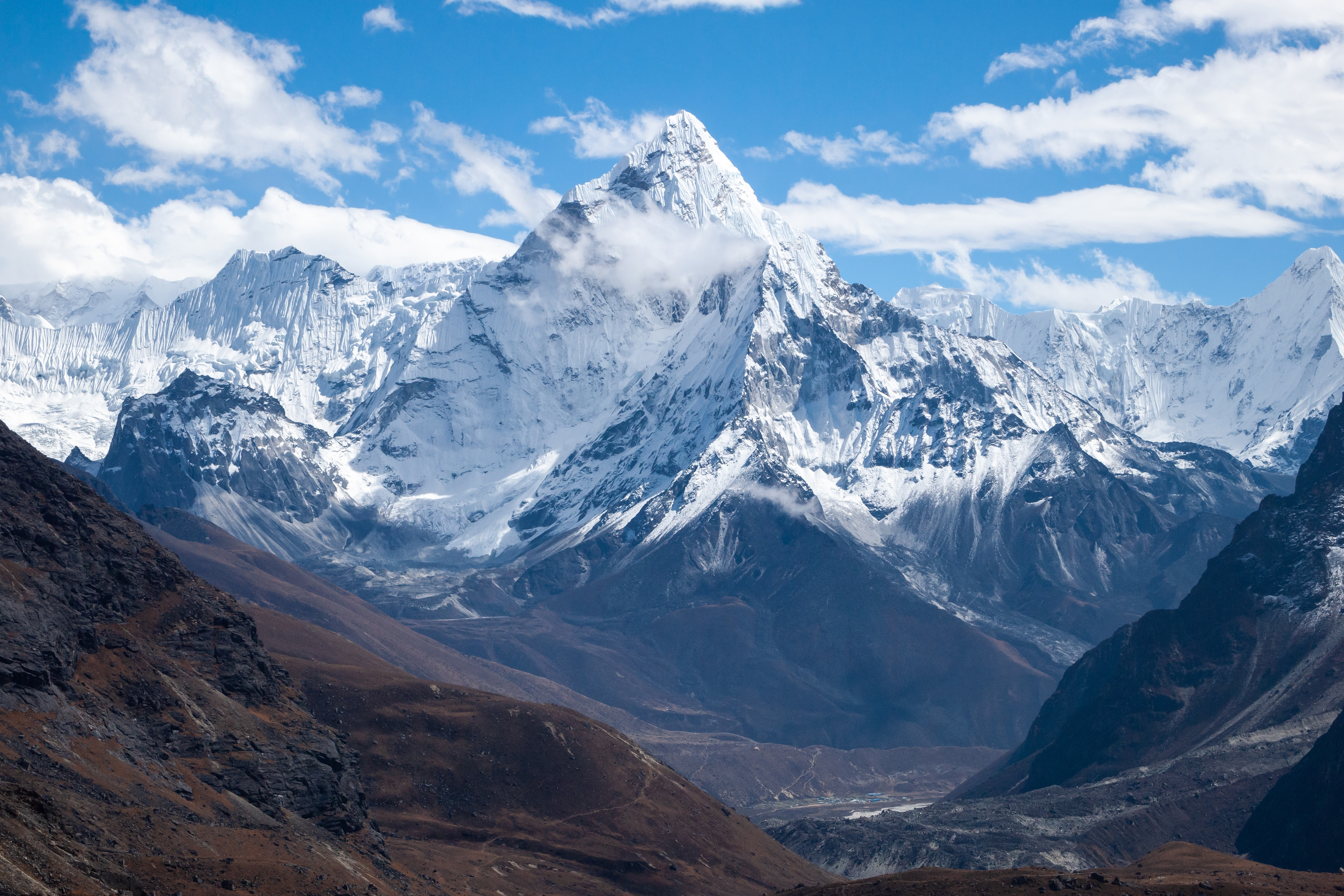
- View of Ama Dablam from the northwest

Highest point
- Elevation: 6,812 m (22,349 ft)
- Prominence: 1,041 m (3,415 ft)
- Listing: Mountains of Nepal
- Coordinates: 27°51′40″N 86°51′40″E

Naming
- English translation: Mother's Necklace

Geography
- Location within Koshi Province Location within Nepal
- Location: Khumbu, Solukhumbu District, Nepal
- Parent range: Khumbu Himal

Climbing
- First ascent: 13 March 1961
- Easiest route: Rock/snow/ice climb

Ama Dablam (Nepali: अमा दब्लम, lit. 'Mother's Necklace') is a mountain in the Eastern Himalayas range of Koshi Province, Nepal. The main peak is 6,812 metres (22,349 ft), the lower western peak is 6,170 metres (20,243 ft). The name Ama Dablam literally means 'mother's charm box' in the Sherpa language; the long ridges on each side like the arms of a mother (ama) protecting her child, and the hanging glacier thought of as the dablam, the traditional double-pendant containing pictures of the gods, worn by Sherpa women. For several days, Ama Dablam dominates the eastern sky for anyone trekking to Mount Everest Base Camp.Because of its soaring ridges and steep faces, Ama Dablam is sometimes referred as the "Matterhorn of the Himalayas". The mountain is featured on the one rupee Nepalese banknote.

Alfred Gregory led the first attempt to climb Ama Dablam in 1958. The first successful ascent was made on 13 March 1961, when Mike Gill (NZ), Barry Bishop (US), Mike Ward (UK) and Wally Romanes (NZ) climbed the Southwest Ridge. They were well-acclimatised to altitude, having wintered over at 5,800 metres (19,029 ft) near the base of the peak as part of the 1960–61 Silver Hut expedition, led by Sir Edmund Hillary, who had called Ama Dablam "unclimbable".

The mountain is 162 km (101 mi) north of the provincial capital of Biratnagar and 152 km (94 mi) northeast of Kathmandu. In the mid-1980s it was still considered to be "a formidable challenge" with "steep awkward sections on both rock and ice", but since then ascents have become considerably more straightforward with lines of fixed rope placed along most of the route and Ama Dablam has become the third most popular Himalayan peak for permitted expeditions. The most popular route by far is the Southwest Ridge. Prior to a 2006 avalanche, climbers typically set up three camps along the ridge, with Camp III just below and to the right of the hanging glacier, the Dablam. Any ice that calves off the glacier typically goes left, away from the camp. However, after the avalanche, climbers now prefer to set just two camps to minimize risk. Camp I is at an altitude of over 5,800 m (19,000 ft), and Camp II is at an altitude of over 6,000 m (20,000 ft). A climbing permit and a liaison officer are required when attempting Ama Dablam. As with Mount Everest, the best climbing months are April and May (before the monsoon) and September and October.

== Notable ascents ==
- 1961 Southwest Ridge (VI 5.9 60deg 1500m) FA (First Ascent) by Mike Gill (NZ), Barry Bishop (US), Mike Ward (UK), and Wally Romanes (NZ), see 1960-61 Silver Hut expedition.
- 1979 Southwest Ridge SA by Martin Boysen (UK); Tom Frost, David Breashears, Greg Lowe, Jeff Lowe, Peter Pilafian, Jonathan Wright (all US), and Lhakpa Dorje (Nepal) reached the summit on 22 April in blizzard conditions, as part of a well-financed climb-and-film expedition. Doug Robinson and John Wasson (both USA) reached the summit the next day.
- 1979 Lowe Route on the South Face (VI AI4 M5 1200m), FA Solo by Jeff Lowe, 30 April 1979.
- 1979 North Ridge (VI 5.7 70deg 1600m) by a large French expedition led by Raymond Renaud and Yvan Estienne placed 14 Frenchmen and 4 Nepalese Sherpa in three groups on the summit over three days, 21-23 Oct 1979.
- 1981 Northeast Spur to North Ridge (VI 5.7 70deg 1500m) by Tim McCartney-Snape, Lincoln Hall, and Andrew Henderson (AUS).
- 1983 East Ridge (VI 80deg 1500m) by Alain Hubert (Belgium) and André Georges (Switzerland).
- 1984 Southwest Ridge solo by Naoe Sakashita (JP).
- 1985 Ariake-Sakashita on the west face (VI 5.7 65deg 1400m) by Masayuki Ariake and Naoe Sakashita (both JP).
- 1985 Northeast Face (VI mixed 90deg 1400m) winter ascent by Michael Kennedy and Carlos Buhler (both US).
- 1996 Stane Belak Šrauf Memorial Route on the northwest face (VI 5.7 AI5 A2+ 1650m) by Vanja Furlan and Tomaž Humar (both from Slovenia), which earned them the 1996 Piolet d'Or prize.
- 1996 North Ridge Austro-German alpine-style ascent by Friedl Huber, Max Berger, Alois Badegruber, and Roman Dirnböck.
- 2001 Northwest Ridge (VI Scottish 7, 2000m) by Jules Cartwright and Rich Cross (both UK).
- 2021 by the first Arab woman, Nadhira Al Harthy Asma Al Thani was the first Qatari woman to later summit.
- 2023 by Mathéo Jacquemoud, French mountain guide.
- 2023 by Tomáš Otruba, Czech mountaineer.
- 2024 by Laura Dahlmeier, German mountaineer, fastest time by a woman, 12 h 1 min.
- 2024 by Tyler Andrews, American mountaineer. Fastest time from base camp, 6 hours 20 minutes round trip.
- 2024 by Chris Fisher, American mountaineer. Fastest time from Pangboche, 11 hours 20 minutes round trip.
- 2026 by Tom Halton, British mountaineer. Youngest person to solo climb the mountain.

== Accidents ==
In May 1959, George Fraser and Mike Harris, two of Britain's finest climbers, were last seen at 6,400 metres (21,000 ft) on the mountain's north ridge, but never returned to tell whether they had reached the summit.

On the night of 13/14 November 2006, a large serac collapse occurred from the hanging glacier, which swept away several tents at Camp III, killing six climbers (three European, three Nepalese). Eyewitness testimony indicates that Camp III had not been sited in an unusual or abnormally dangerous spot, and that the serac fall was of such magnitude as to render the specific placing of the tents at Camp III irrelevant.

In the spring of 2014, two experienced Russian mountaineers, Victor Igolkin, a four-time USSR mountaineering champion, and Pavel Ivanovsky, both died from high-altitude pulmonary edema (HAPE) between camps 2 and 3.

On 23 October 2014, Azerbaijani climber Murad Ashurly died after his rope snapped, causing him to fall about 300 metres while descending from Camp 2 to Camp 1.

On November 28, 2016, highly acclaimed climbing Sherpa Lakpa Thundu Sherpa of Pangboche was killed when a 5.4 magnitude earthquake struck, triggering an avalanche and the release of a few ice blocks. Thundu was at 6,000 metres (19,680 ft) on the 6,812-metre (22,349 ft) mountain.

On 11 November 2017, Russian BASE jumper Valery Rozov was killed when he jumped from the mountain in a wingsuit and struck a cliff.

On 15 November 2018, A 33 year old Australian mountaineer fell to his death whilst with a group of 15 climbers.

On 28 April 2025, Austrian climber Martin Hornegger was reported dead after he fell during his descent from the mountain on 26 April.

During October 2025, two climbers died in separate incidents. A French mountaineer died after being hit on the head by a falling piece of ice and a South Korean mountaineer died during the ascent to camp two.

On 26 October 2026, Wolfgang Waschiczek, a 57‑year‑old German mountaineer, died after a fall of about 1,500–1,700 metres after summiting the peak on the previous day. He reportedly fell from his tent where his guide Sonam Lama had told him to stay while he returned borrowed equipment. When Lama returned a few minutes later, Waschiczek was missing.

== Representation ==
Ama Dablam is depicted on the former Nepalese one-rupee note issued by Nepal Rastra Bank during the reign of King Birendra. The reverse features the mountain in the background, with two Himalayan musk deer and the former coat of arms. The obverse features a portrait of King Birendra and the Pashupatinath Temple.

A representation of Ama Dablam was formally used by Invesco Perpetual as its branding logo within the United Kingdom. It has since been adopted by the Invesco group of companies as its worldwide signature.

== See also ==
- Chankheli Peak – another mountain in Nepal often mistaken for Ama Dablam
