= Nepalese 1-paisa coin =

One Paisa एक पैसा
- Nepal
- Value: 0.01 रू Nepalese rupee
- Mass: 0.5–3.0 (varies by issue) g
- Diameter: 15–23 (varies by issue) mm
- Composition: Brass / Copper / Aluminium
- Years of minting: 1940s–1980s (various monarch issues)

Obverse
- Design: Monarch’s name and national symbols

Reverse
- Design: “एक पैसा” (one paisa) in Devanagari script

The Nepalese one‑paisa coin (एक पैसा / 0.01 NPR) was a fractional denomination of the Nepalese rupee. It was issued in various designs and compositions under different Nepalese monarchs during the 20th century. These coins are no longer in circulation and have been demonetized as small denominations became impractical due to inflation.

== History ==
The *paisa* denomination was part of Nepal’s currency system where 100 paisa equaled one rupee. Nepalese one‑paisa coins were produced under different monarchs, including issues under King Tribhuvan Bir Bikram Shah with copper/brass composition, typical of mid‑20th century issues., brass issues under King Mahendra Bir Bikram Shah during the 1960s., and aluminium issues under King Birendra Bir Bikram Shah in the 1970s and early 1980s.

== Design ==
The obverse side typically featured inscriptions in Devanagari with the name and title of the reigning monarch. The reverse side showed the denomination “एक पैसा” surrounded by simple motifs. Composition varied from heavier copper/brass in earlier issues to lighter aluminium in later issues.

== Demonetization ==
By the late 20th century, due to inflation and changes in monetary policy, the one‑paisa coin ceased being practical for circulation and was gradually withdrawn from legal tender.
