= Nepalese one-rupee note =

One Rupee एक रुपैयाँ
- Country: Nepal
- Value: रु 1
- Width: 107 mm
- Height: 70 mm
- Years of printing: 1953 – 1999

Obverse
- Design: Portrait of reigning king & Pashupatinath Temple

Reverse
- Design: Mount Ama Dablam & a couple of Himalayan Musk deer.

The Nepalese one-rupee banknote (रु 1) was the lowest denomination of the Nepalese rupee and was first issued in 1953. The note remained in circulation for several decades and was commonly used for small-value transactions throughout Nepal. Throughout its issuance, the note featured portraits of the reigning monarch.

The one-rupee banknote continued to be printed until 1999, after which it was gradually withdrawn from circulation and replaced by coins of the same denomination.
