= Israfil Ashurly =

Azerbaijani mountaineer (born 1969)

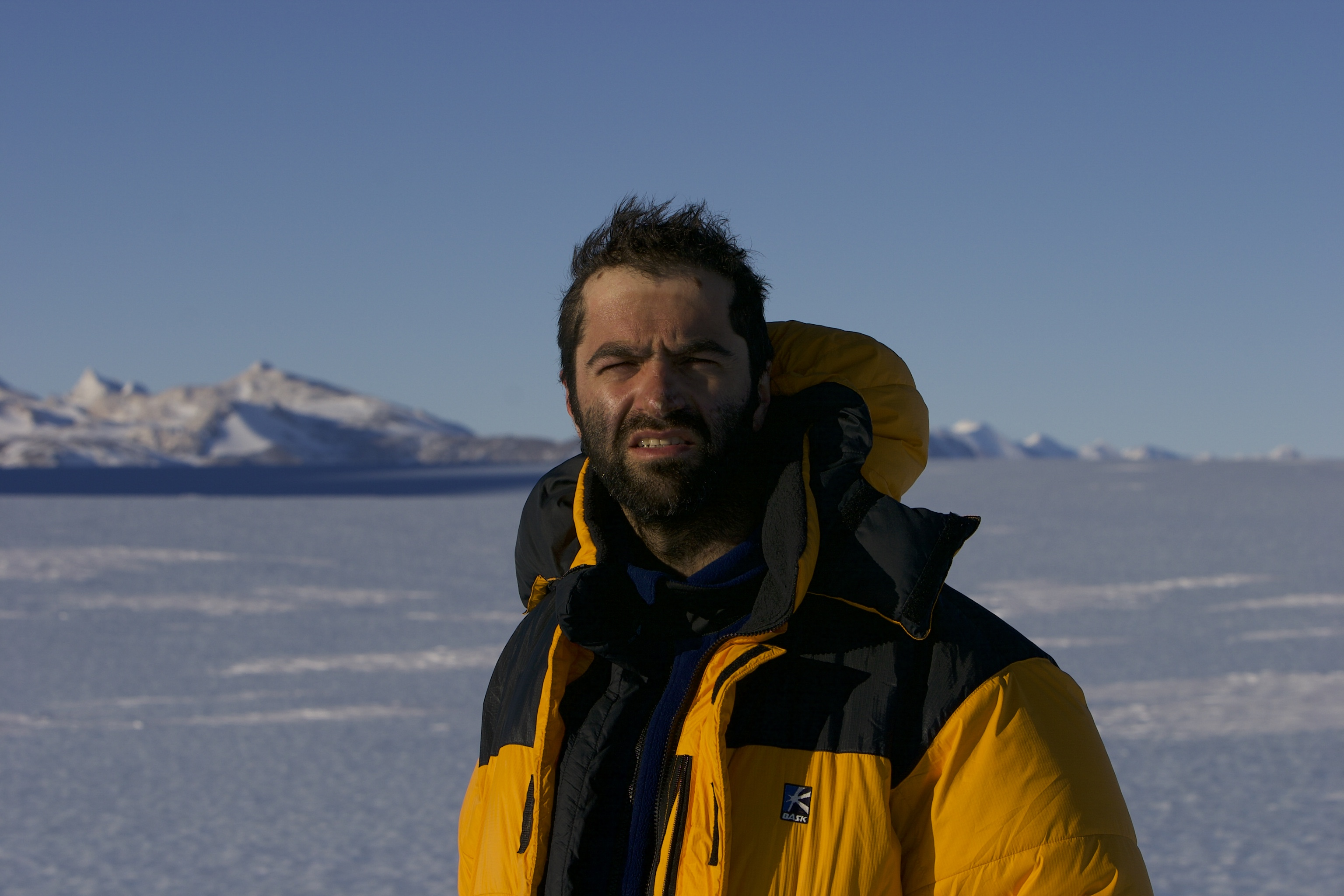
- Ashurly in 2005
- Born: January 16, 1969 (age 57); Baku, Azerbaijani SSR, USSR
- Education: Azerbaijan State Oil Academy
- Occupations: Mountaineer, Explorer, Mountaineering instructor & guide
- Spouse: Maria Ashurly
- Children: Aslan Ashurly, Ali Ashurly and Maryam Ashurly
- Awards: Tereggi Medal

Israfil Ashurly (Azerbaijani: İsrafil Aşurlı; born January 16, 1969, in Baku, Azerbaijani SSR, USSR) is an Azerbaijani mountaineer. He is a co-founder of Azerbaijan Alpine Club (Azərbaycan Alpine Klubu). He was executive secretary of the Ice-Climbing Commission (2010–2017) under the UIAA (International Climbing and Mountaineering Federation), president of the youth committee (Youth Commission 2012–2016) UIAA, president of the Azerbaijan Mountaineering Federation (2010–2016), Member of the Presidium of the Euro-Asian Association of Mountaineering and Climbing (EAMA since 2011), and a judge of the international category in ice climbing, master of sports of the Republic of Azerbaijan.

He is the first Azerbaijani to successfully summit all Himalayan eight-thousanders: Chomolungma (2007), Kangchenjunga (2011), Lhotse (2019), Manaslu (2019) Broad Peak (2022), Makalu (2023), Nanga Parbat (2024) and Gasherbrum II (2024). As Azerbaijan's first member of the Seven Summits club (2007), also the first Snow Leopard in the history of Azerbaijani mountaineering (2009) and the first conqueror of the North Pole (2009). The first of the Azerbaijanis landed in Antarctica in December 2005 and climbed the highest peak of the white continent — the Vinson Massif.

On March 4, 2009, by Decree of the President of the Republic of Azerbaijan, Ashurly was awarded the Taraggi (Progress) medal. Cavalier of the mountaineering Order "Edelweiss" I and II degrees.

== Biography ==
He was born on January 16, 1969, in the city of Baku. He graduated school number 6 in Baku, and from Azerbaijan State Oil Academy's energy faculty.

In 1991, Israfil Ashurly organized the Insol company, which in 1998 began installing and launching telecommunication equipment for mobile and wireline operators. The company has offices in Russia, Kazakhstan, Azerbaijan, and Kyrgyzstan. He is a member of the Board of Managing Directors of the Insol Group of Companies, and CEO of the management company "Insol Consulting". He has also been vice-president of the Swiss company iCsquared GmbH in Russia, the Baltic countries and the CIS. www.icsquared.ch

Ashurly became interested in mountaineering after Insol was created. This happened, as he said, by accident. In 1999, he made an exotic tourist trekking to the foot of Kanchenjunga (8586m) in the Himalayas. He stated “I didn’t understand how people go to the mountains, live in tents. My habits were quite sybaritic.” In the Indian state of Sikkim, he got to the five thousandth pass of Gocha La. Here is how Israfil describes his impressions: “When people go to the mountains, they have two choices: either they don’t like them and never return, or they love them so much that they can’t wait to go back. I fall into the second category.”

== Expeditions ==
In 2000, while on a holiday visit to near Kangchenjunga's foot, Ashurly became interested in mountaineering. In next seven years, he became ninth person to complete Seven Summits challenge.

=== Seven Summits ===
Ashurly's Completion of the Seven Summits
	Date	Place	Elevation	Description
1.	January 16, 2001	Mount Kilimanjaro	5895 m	Highest Mountain in Africa
2.	May 26, 2002	Mount Kosciuszko	2228 m	Highest Mountain in Australia
3.	July 7, 2003	Mount Elbrus	5642 m	Highest Mountain in Europe
4.	January 28, 2004	Aconcagua	6961 m	Highest Mountain in South America
5.	June 5, 2005	Mount McKinley	6194 m	Highest Mountain in North America
6.	December 23, 2006	Vinson Massif	4897 m	Highest Mountain in Antarctica
7.	May 19, 2007	Mount Everest	8848 m	Highest Mountain in Asia and the World

=== Snow Leopard Summits ===
Ashurly's Completion of the Snow Leopard Summits
	Date	Place	Elevation
1.	August 7, 2004	Lenin Peak	7134 m
2.	August 17, 2005	Peak Korzhenevskaya	7105 m
3.	August 15, 2006	Ismoil Somoni Peak	7495 m
4.	August 8, 2009	Khan Tengri	7010 m
5.	August 20, 2009	Jengish Chokusu	7439 m

=== Volcanic Seven Summits ===
Ashurly's Completion of the Volcanic Seven Summits
	Date	Place	Elevation
1.	January 16, 2001	Mount Kilimanjaro	5895 m
2.	March 10, 2002	Mount Fuji	3776 m
3.	July 7, 2003	Mount Elbrus	5642 m
4.	August 22, 2003	Mount Aghri	5137 m

=== 14x8000 meters Himalayas and Karakoram expeditions ===
Ashurly's Completion of the 8000ers
	Date	Place	Elevation
1.	May 19, 2007	Mount Everest	8848 m
2.	May 21, 2011	Mt. Kangchenjunga	8586 m
3.	May 22, 2019	Mt. Lhotse	8516 m
4.	September 26, 2019	Mt. Manaslu	8163 m
5.	July 23, 2022	Mt. Broad Peak	8051 m
6.	May 18, 2023	Mt. Makalu	8485 m
7.	July 10, 2024	Mt. Nanga Parbat	8126 m
8.	July 23, 2024	Mt. Gasherbrum II	8035 m

=== List of all Himalayas and Karakoram expeditions ===
In 2003, he reached Lapchi mountain (6,017) with Russian alpinist Vladimir Shatayev. In 2007, Ashurly reached Everest with Sergey Kofanov. In 2011, he reached Kangchenjunga with Russian alpinists Aleksey Bolotov and Nikolay Totmyanin.

2013 Nanga Parbat expedition. Expedition was interrupted by terrorist attack on base camp.

2014 Shishabangma expedition. Climbed till 6800m and moved down due to pulmonary edema.

2019 climbed Island Peak.

2019 climbed Lhotse.

2019 climbed Manaslu.

2019 climbed Island Peak.

2019 climbed Ama Dablam.

2021 Annapurna expedition. Climbed till 6800m and moved down due to avalanches risks.

2021 Broad Peak expedition. Climbed till 7900m and moved down due to avalanches risks.

2022 climbed Broad Peak

2023 climbed Makalu

2023 Nanga Parbat expedition. Expedition was interrupted at C4 (7400 m) due to a rescue operation by Pakistani climber Asif Bhatti.

2024 climbed Nanga Parbat

2024 climbed Gasherbrum II

== Rescue of Mountaineers ==
In July 2022, Israfil Ashurly rescued Romanian mountaineer Geo Badea, who was ascending Broad Peak (8,051 m).

In early July 2023, during an ascent of Nanga Parbat (8,125 m) in the Himalayas, Ashurly, according to Russian mountaineer Sergey Kofanov, abandoned his own climb in order to rescue two stranded climbers. One of them, Pavel Kopec from Poland, was found by Ashurly in a hopeless condition and died in Israfil's arms. The other climber, Pakistani Asif Bhatti, was dragged by Ashurly to Camp III, where both were trapped due to severe weather conditions. After descending to Camp II, with the assistance of two Pakistani climbers, they managed to reach the base camp.

== See also ==
- Murad Ashurly
