= Tom Halton =

English mountaineer (born 2005)

Tom Halton (born June 2005) is an English mountaineer from Redcar in North Yorkshire. He is known for being the youngest person in the world to solo climb Ama Dablam in Nepal. He achieved this feat at age twenty on 23 April 2026 during his third attempt on the mountain.

== Climbing career ==
Halton began mountaineering at an early age on family trips to Glen Coe in the Scottish Highlands. He soon progressed onto Scottish winter climbing.

=== Ama Dablam solo ascent ===
On 23 April 2026, Halton became the youngest person in the world to solo climb Ama Dablam. He achieved this feat on his third attempt.

Halton made his first attempt on Ama Dablam In April 2025, whilst nineteen years old. The attempt ended only 100 metres short of the summit after he fell into and then climbed out of a crevasse causing a leg injury. His second attempt, in October 2025, ended due to bad weather caused by Cyclone Montha.

In April 2026, Halton returned to Ama Dablam and this time he was successful and reached the summit on 23 April at 11am (Nepal time). This ascent broke the record for world's youngest solo summiter of Ama Dablam. The previous record was held by Jost Kobusch who was twenty-two years old at the time of his ascent. Reaching the summit of Ama Dablam marked Halton's fifth ascent of a 6,000-meter mountain.

=== Other climbs ===
Halton has also made multiple successful ascents of Mont Blanc and the Matterhorn.

== See also ==
- List of climbers and mountaineers
- List of English sportsmen and sportswomen
