= Nepalese two-hundred-fifty-rupee note =

Two Hundred Fifty Rupees दुई सय पचास रुपैयाँ
- Country: Nepal
- Value: रू 250
- Width: 173 mm
- Height: 70 mm
- Security features: Serial nos, watermark of Crown, multicolor Hologram of logo & 1.5 mm colored windowed clear-text security thread.
- Years of printing: 1997

Obverse
- Design: Portrait of King Birendra, Hanuman Dhoka Palace & Parliament building.

Reverse
- Design: A cow on the fields and Mount Machhapuchre on the background.

The Nepalese two-hundred-fifty-rupee banknote (रु 250) was a special commemorative denomination of the Nepalese rupee, first issued in 1997. It was released to mark the Silver Jubilee (25 years) of King Birendra's coronation and was circulated in limited quantities throughout Nepal.

As a commemorative banknote, the रु.250 was not intended for long-term circulation and remains a notable collectible in Nepal's currency history.
