= Nepalese twenty-five-rupee note =

Twenty Five Rupees पच्चीस रुपैयाँ
- Country: Nepal
- Value: रू 25
- Width: 140 mm
- Height: 70 mm
- Security features: Serial nos, watermark of Crown & windowed clear-text security thread.
- Years of printing: 1997

Obverse
- Design: Portrait of King Birendra, Hanuman Dhoka Palace & Parliament building.

Reverse
- Design: A cow on the fields and Mount Machhapuchre on the background.

The Nepalese twenty-five-rupee banknote (रु 25) was a special commemorative denomination of the Nepalese rupee, first issued in 1997. It was released to mark the Silver Jubilee (25 years) of King Birendra's coronation and was circulated in limited quantities across Nepal.
