= Nepalese ten-rupee note =

Ten Rupees दश रुपैयाँ
- Country: Nepal
- Value: रू 10 (pegged at ₹ 6.25)
- Width: 134 mm
- Height: 70 mm
- Security features: Security thread, micro-lettering, watermark, intaglio (raised) printing, latent image, see-through registration device, fluorescent ink (UV feature).
- Material used: Cotton Paper
- Years of printing: 2008 – present

Obverse
- Design: Mount Everest(Sagarmatha); statue of Lord Vishnu in his mount Garuda from Changunarayan Temple.
- Designer: Nepal Rastra Bank
- Design date: 2008; 18 years ago

Reverse
- Design: Blackbuck(s) grazing
- Designer: Nepal Rastra Bank
- Design date: 2008; 18 years ago

The Nepalese ten-rupee banknote (रु 10) is a common denomination of the Nepalese rupee. The note is currently in circulation and is used for small-value transactions throughout Nepal.

The denomination was first introduced during the monarchy of Nepal and featured portraits of the King. Following the abolition of the monarchy in 2008, the Nepal Rastra Bank introduced a new series replacing the royal portrait with images of national landmarks and cultural symbols.
