= Asian Clearing Union =

International trade organization

- Logo
- Type: Clearing Union
- Central Banks or Monetary Authorities: 11

Leaders
  - Chairman: Dr. Abdulnaser Hemmati
  - Secretary-General: Dr. Mojtaba Khalesi
- Establishment: 1974
- Website www.asianclearingunion.org

The Asian Clearing Union (ACU) was established on December 9, 1974, at the initiative of the United Nations Economic and Social Commission for Asia and the Pacific (ESCAP). The primary objective of ACU, at the time of its establishment, was to secure regional co-operation regarding the clearing of eligible monetary transactions among the members of the Union to provide a system for clearing payments among the member countries on a multilateral basis.

== Objectives ==
- To facilitate settlement of payments on a multilateral basis,
- To promote the use of participants' currencies,
- To promote monetary co-operation among the participants,
- To provide for currency swap arrangement among the participants.

== Settlement process ==
Period: Bimonthly Settlement

Payment deadline: T+4

== Currency swap arrangements ==
Eligibility: Any participant in net deficit

Time of request: Before the end of a settlement period

Amount: 20% of the average gross payments (ACU dollar/euro/yen accounts collectively) made by every eligible participant

Rate: linear interpolation of Chicago Mercantile Exchange: CME SOFR one month and three month for US Dollar, the EURIBOR two month for Euro, two month LIBOR declared by the ICE for Japanese Yen

Benefits:

- Easy access to international reserves of other participants
- Availability of the facility on a multilateral basis
- The opportunity for further monetary co-operation

In February 2025, according to some sources, it was revealed that the representatives of the Standing Technical Committee of Asian Clearing Union (STCACU) held a meeting in Dhaka to focus on the implementation of ACUMER as the tailor made platform in the process of facilitation of payment systems for cross-border transactions. The meeting agenda focused on introducing digital currency and simplifying the cross-border transaction method where the notion of implementing ACUMER was brought into the equation. In addition, there were recommendations and suggestions requested towards all the member countries of Asian Clearing Union such as Bangladesh, Bhutan, Iran, India, Maldives, Nepal, Pakistan, Sri Lanka, and Myanmar to join the ACUMER by March 2025 which was set as the cutoff period and complete the financial transactions.

== Units of accounts ==
AMU: Asian Monetary Units (viz. ACU dollar, ACU euro, and ACU yen),

The AMUs are denominated as ACU dollar, ACU euro, and ACU yen which are equivalent in value to 1 USD, 1 Euro, and 1 JPY, respectively.

== Interest ==
- Payable by the net debtors at the end of each settlement period,
- Calculated on the daily outstanding between settlement dates,
- Interest rate will be the closing rate on the last Monday of the previous calendar month offered by Chicago Mercantile Exchange Secured Overnight Financing Rate (CME SOFR) term one month for US Dollar, the Euro Interbank Offered Rate (EURIBOR) one month for Euro, and the Inter-Continental Exchange (ICE) for one month Japanese Yen deposits

== Exchange rate ==
The SDR cross-rates which are quoted by the IMF on a daily basis are applied as a reference rate.

== Benefits of becoming a member ==
- Saving Forex reserves through multilateral netting and bi-monthly settlement,
- Addressing trade imbalances and expanding of trade and monetary cooperation between members,
- No need to accumulate the currencies of other members,
- Access to new markets and monetary integration and financial deepening,
- Possibility of using USD, EUR, and JPY as reserve currencies,
- No membership fee,
- Higher clearing efficiency,

== Members ==
Currently 2024, the members of ACU are the central banks of Bangladesh, Bhutan, Iran, India, Maldives, Nepal, Pakistan, Sri Lanka, and Myanmar. The central banking authorities of member countries have issued detailed instructions and modalities for channeling the monetary transactions through the ACU. Membership in the ACU is open to central banks located in the geographical area of ESCAP and non-ESCAP.

State	Central Bank	Year
Bangladesh	Bangladesh Bank	1974
Bhutan	Royal Monetary Authority of Bhutan	1999
India	Reserve Bank of India	1974
Iran	Central Bank of the Islamic Republic of Iran	1974
Maldives	Maldives Monetary Authority	2009
Myanmar	Central Bank of Myanmar	1977
Nepal	Nepal Rastra Bank	1974
Pakistan	State Bank of Pakistan	1974
Sri Lanka	Central Bank of Sri Lanka	1974
Belarus	National Bank of Belarus	2024

== Eligible transactions ==
All eligible transactions between member countries are required to be cleared through the Asian Clearing Union. The monetary transactions eligible to be settled through the Asian Clearing Union include the following:

- From a resident of one participant to a resident of another participant,
- Related to import and export of goods and services,
- Permitted by the country in which the payer resides,
- Not declared ineligible by the BOD or a participant.

== Instruments of payment ==
All instruments of payment denominated in AMUs (ACU dollar, ACU euro, and ACU yen), may be used to effect payment through the clearing facility.

== Figures ==
Transactions channeled through the ACU mechanism in 2021 amounted to 29 billion USD.
