= Nepalese 5-rupee coin =

Five Rupees पाँच रुपैयाँ
- Nepal
- Value: रू 5
- Mass: 8.0 g
- Diameter: 25 mm
- Composition: Brass

Obverse
- Design: Shree Pach Birendra Bir Bikram Shah Dev

Reverse
- Design: Pashupatinath Temple

The Nepalese five-rupee coin (रु 5) was a low-denomination coin of the Nepalese rupee, primarily used for small transactions and as change in Nepal when it was in circulation. The coin featured national symbols and different cultural motifs,depending on the series.

Although it is no longer minted, there were talks in 2023 to restart its production, highlighting its continued significance in Nepal's currency system.
