= Murad Ashurly =

- Born: August 31, 1972; Moscow, Russian Federation, USSR
- Died: October 23, 2014 (aged 42); Ama Dablam, Nepal
- Education: Moscow State University of Geodesy and Cartography
- Occupations: Businessman, mountaineer, explorer

Murad Ashurly (Azerbaijani: Murad Aşurlı; born August 31, 1972, in Moscow, Russian Federation, USSR - 22 October 2014 in Ama Dablam, Nepal) was an Azerbaijani mountaineer, cousin of the prominent climber Israfil Ashurly. He was the first Azerbaijani to climb Mount Everest and Kangchenjunga, completing the Seven Summits challenge in 2007.

== Biography ==
Ashurly joined Ericsson in 1998, and worked as director of customer solutions sales. His extensive experience at Ericsson has taken him to Sweden, Russia and Central Asia. He has held various sales, solution and operational positions in United States.

In 2000, he defended a thesis for PhD on "Development and research of the parabolic reflector in order to improve the energy characteristics of a solar installation" at Moscow State University of Geodesy and Cartography in Russia.

He died on the return journey after successfully ascending the Mount Ama Dablam in the Himalaya range. An autopsy revealed he died after falling about 300 metres downhill after his rope snapped, on his way down from Camp 2 to Camp 1. He was buried in the United States at his family's request.

== Books and other writings ==
Prior to his death, he finished work on his book "Finding Your Everest" on alpinism, which was published in 2015.
