= Maha Prasad Adhikari =

Biography of 17th Governor of Central Bank of Nepal Maha Prasad Adhikari

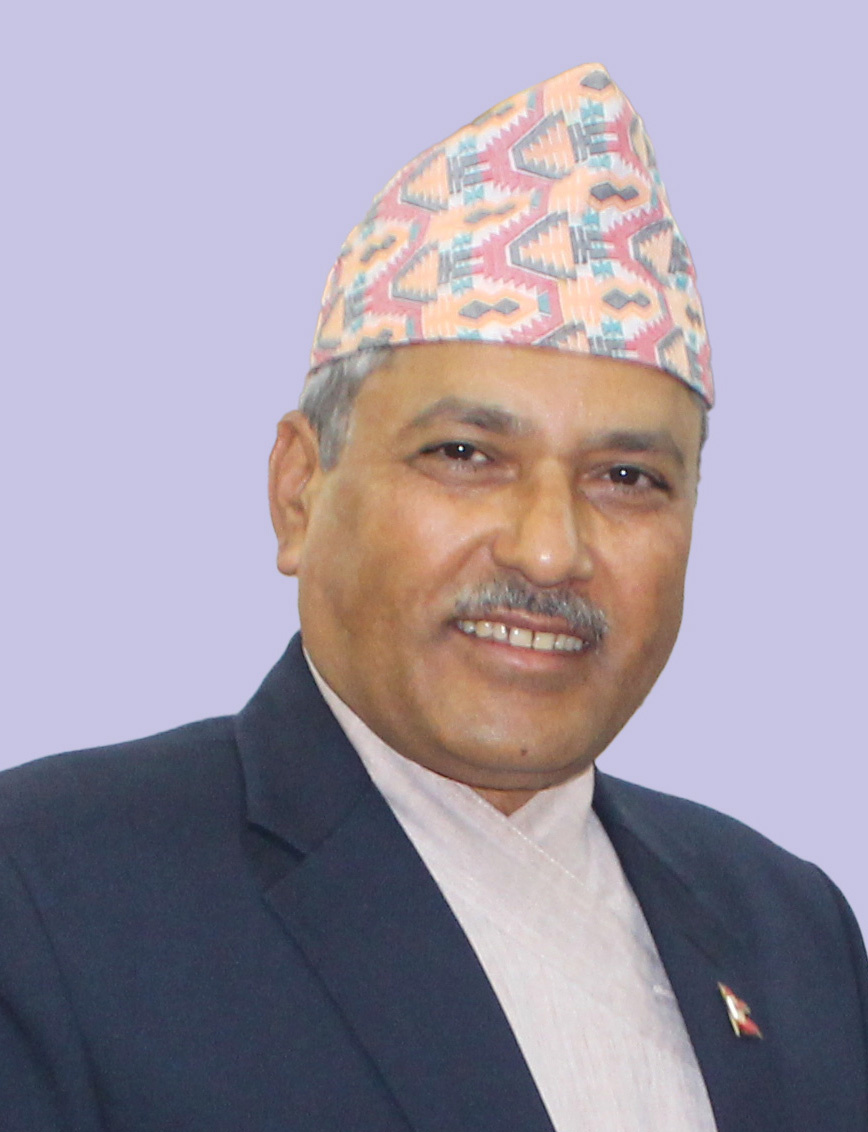
- Maha Prasad Adhikari in 2023

17th Governor of Nepal Rastra Bank (Note: Adhikari was suspended from the post of Governor on 8th April 2022 by Government of Nepal and the Supreme Court of Nepal reinstated him to the post on 20th April 2022.)
- In office 6 April 2020 – 5 April 2025
- Preceded by: Chiranjivi Nepal

Chief Executive Officer at Investment Board of Nepal (Note: Adhikari was appointed for four years as per the provision of the Investment Board Act 2011, however, he resigned from the post after he was appointed as the Governor of Nepal Rastra Bank.)
- In office June 2016 – April 2020
- Preceded by: Radhesh Pant
- Succeeded by: Sushil Bhatta

Deputy Governor of Nepal Rastra Bank
- In office 2010–2015

Personal details
- Education: Tribhuvan University; Institute of Chartered Accountants of India (Chartered Accountant)

Maha Prasad Adhikari (Note: Nepali: महाप्रसाद अधिकारी) was the 17th governor of Nepal Rastra Bank (NRB), the Central Bank of Nepal. He was the chairperson of the board of directors of the bank as per the provisions of the Nepal Rastra Bank Act 2002. He was appointed as the governor of the bank by Government of Nepal on 6 April 2020. Before he was appointed as the governor, he also served as the chief executive officer of the Investment Board Nepal (IBN) for three years. He also worked as the deputy governor of Nepal Rastra Bank for five years during 2010-2015.

== Education ==
Adhikari holds a bachelor's degree from Tribhuvan University and also is a chartered accountant from the Institute of Chartered Accountants of India which he obtained during his service at NRB. Later, he obtained an equivalency certificate for a Master's degree from Tribhuvan University. He is also a fellow member of Institute of Chartered Accountants of Nepal (ICAN). After he was appointed the CEO of IBN, former CEO of IBN, Radhesh Pant who was also competing with Adhikari for the post filed a writ challenging the academic qualifications of Adhikari in the Supreme Court of Nepal. He claimed Adhikari lacked the required Master's degree specified in the Investment Board Act of 2011. The court decided to hold the final hearing on the petition against his appointment.

== Career ==
Adhikari served Nepal Rastra Bank for more than thirty years in different capacities. He worked in areas such as the implementation of Risk Based Supervision and Accounting Standards in Nepalese Banks and Financial Institutions.

During his tenure as the Governor of NRB, the Bank facilitated private players to implement the latest payment technology like QR payment for retail payments which has now spread across the country.

During his term as the CEO of IBN, IBN organized two international investments summit to attract foreign direct investment in Nepal aftermath of the April 2015 Nepal earthquake.

== Notable events ==
In 2022, the Federal Bureau of Investigation conducted an investigation into a transnational fraud scheme affecting U.S. citizens which involved posing as legitimate technology and antivirus companies to steal money from them. The fund was then transferred to bank accounts controlled by Prithvi Bahadur Shah in Nepal. Nepal Rastra Bank received a request from the Financial Crimes Enforcement Network to confiscate and return the money. The Bank withheld the money and directed it to the Department of Money Laundering Investigation for further Investigation. Finance Minister Janardan Sharma who was accused of being closely associated with Shah applied pressure on Nepal Rastra Bank to release the funds which Adhikari refused to fulfill. Amidst the disagreement, Cabinet suspended Adhikari from the post in a charge of leaking sensitive information of the Government. Adhikari went to Supreme Court of Nepal and the court gave an interim order to reinstate him after which he resumed his office.

In July 2022, CPN-UML, the main opposition party in the Nepalese parliament, revealed its central committee members, including a name M Adhikari in the Finance and Planning committee. This led to speculations and criticism on social media, linking him to Governor Adhikari. Adhikari requested the CPN-UML to correct the misinformation, denying any connection to M Adhikari. The party later clarified that the listed M Adhikari is not the NRB Governor, Maha Prasad Adhikari.

== Other activities ==
In 2023, Adhikari was ex-officio member of the board of governors at the International Monetary Fund representing NRB. He represented NRB in the Board of Governors of The South East Asian Central Banks Research and Training Centre (SEACEN) and Asia Pacific Rural and Agriculture credit association (APRACA). He also served as a member of the board of directors at the Alliance for Financial Inclusion (AFI) during 2020-23.

He also served as a member of the Committee for Improvement in Transparency, Accountability and Governance (CITAG) of South Asian Federation of Accountants.
