= Sergey Kofanov =

Russian mountaineer

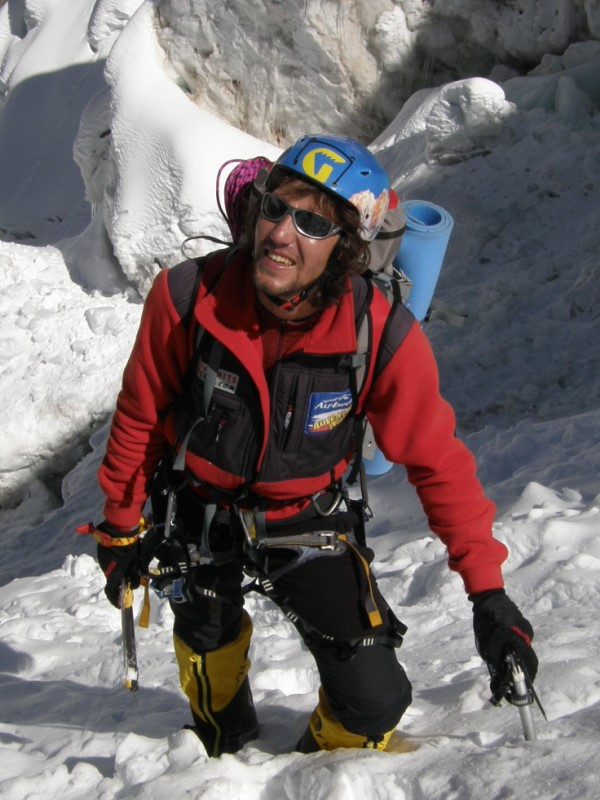
- Himalaya, 2007
- Born: 6 May 1978 (age 47); Yekaterinburg, Soviet Union
- Height: 1.80 m (5 ft 11 in)

Sergey Anatolyevich Kofanov (Russian: Серге́й Анато́льевич Кофа́нов; born 6 May 1978) is a Russian mountaineer.

== Climbing career ==
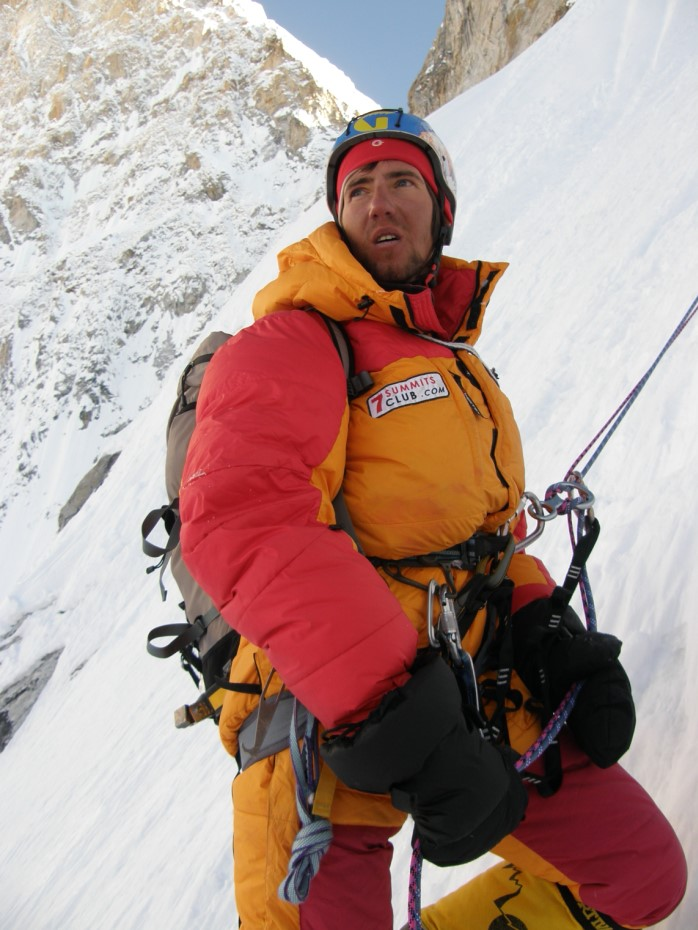
Himalaya, 2007

In May 2006, Kofanov took part in a rescue operation of climber Lincoln Hall on Mount Everest, who was on the verge of death at an altitude of 8,700 metres. Later, Hall wrote a book titled, Dead Lucky, becoming a bestseller.

A year later Kofanov saved the life of the lost and dying Italian climber Marco Epis on Everest, lowering him from an altitude of 8,300 metres. This was the first rescue operation on Everest organized by one person at such altitude, and it received widespread attention, such as the Italian RAI-TV and the English Discovery Channel. In January 2009, he was awarded the medal "The Honour" by the Russian Award Committee for this achievement.

At the age of 28, he became the youngest Russian to summit Everest, and the seventh, and youngest, Russian who finished the Seven Summits.

Kofanov was the champion of national and international championships in alpinism and mountaineering.

He is considered a Merited Master of Sports in Russia.

== Awards ==
- 2000 – won the National Mountaineering Championship and became the Champion of Russia.
- 2001 – won the bronze prize of the National Mountaineering Championship. Became the youngest Russian Master of Sports in the alpinism category.
- 2002 – became the silver prize-winner of the National Mountaineering Championship.
- 2004 – won the bronze prize of the National Mountaineering Championship as the captain and leader of a state team.

== Notable ascents ==
- 2006 – as the guide made ascents to Everest (8848) from Tibet side, Elbrus (5642, the highest peak of Russia), Communism Peak (7495 m, Tajikistan), and Kilimanjaro (5895, Tanzania).
- 2007 - as the guide and the leader of an expedition made ascents in Ecuador mountains and in Argentina to the highest peak of the South America - Aconcagua. For the second time successfully climbed Everest. Took part in the rescue of the Italian climber (Marco Epis) from an altitude of 8300 meters. For the fourth time climbed Kilimanjaro. In August again ascended to E.Korzhenevskoj's Peak (7105) and in October together with Valery Babanov (one of the most world-famous alpinists) made a new route of the highest category of difficulty to the Jannu (7771), Nepal which has been recognized society as the great world achievement in modern mountaineering.

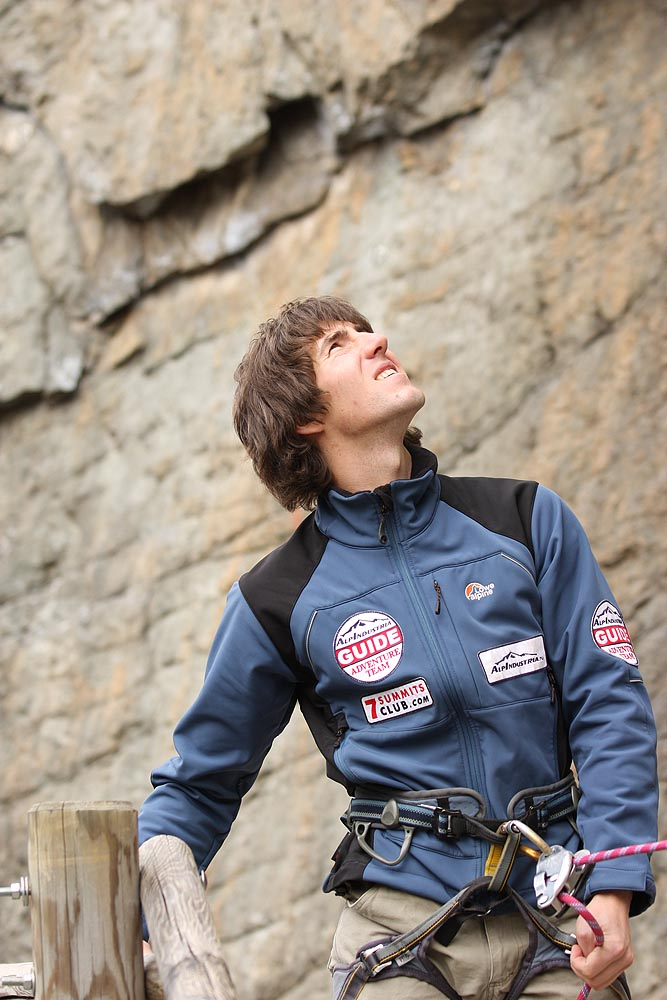
Italy, 2008

- 2008 – as the leader of expeditions successfully climbed Kosiosko (Australia) in January, Cotopaxi (5800), and Chimborazo (6300) in Ecuador in February. Organized international expeditions to Kilimanjaro, Kosiosko, and the highest peak of Oceania – Carstensz Pyramid (4884, Papua, New Guinea). Was the supervisor of several expeditions to Elbrus. Under his guidance to Carstensz (Papua) for the first time climbed the first Russian woman and first Ukrainian mountaineer. In December successfully guided and summited the highest peak of Antarctica – Vinson massif and finished the «7 Summits» project.
- 2009 – in January summited the highest peak of Antarctica again. Under his guidance, the Vinson massif was for the first time climbed the Mongolian summiter. Tries to establish a time-record passage «7 Summits» project - now he is in Argentina, in plans for the near future the Everest, Elbrus, and Denali.
- 2010 - In April Sergey was the organizer and head of the first team that ascended Ama-Dablam in the Himalayas that season. In August Kofanov participated in Snow Leopard (Snezniy Bars) program and made an attempt to ascend Han-Tengri. In autumn Sergey organized and conducted a successful expedition to Ararat.
