= Nepalese two-rupee note =

Two Rupees दुई रुपैयाँ
- Country: Nepal
- Value: रू 2
- Width: 114 mm
- Height: 70 mm
- Security features: Serial number, watermark of crown and metallic thread.
- Years of printing: 1981 – 1999

Obverse
- Design: Portrait of reigning king & Bajrayogini Temple.

Reverse
- Design: Spotted Leopard.

The Nepalese two-rupee banknote (रु 2) was a low-value denomination of the Nepalese rupee, first issued in 1981. The note was in circulation throughout Nepal and commonly used for small transactions. During its issuance, it featured the portrait of the reigning monarch.

The two-rupee banknote continued to be printed until 1999, after which it was gradually phased out and replaced by coins of the same denomination.
