= Nepalese rupee =

Currency of Nepal

नेपाली रुपैयाँ (Nepali) रु
रु.1000 banknote (obverse)
रु.1000 banknote (reverse)

ISO 4217
- Code: NPR (numeric: 524)
- Subunit: 0.01

Units of account
- Base unit: rupee
- Symbol: रु
- Subunit
- 1/100: paisa

Denominations
- Banknotes
- Freq. used: रु5, रु10, रु20, रु50, रु100, रु500, रु1000
- Rarely used: रु1, रु2, रु25, रु250
- Coins
- Freq. used: रु1, रु2
- Rarely used: 1 paisa, 5 paisa, 10 paisa, 25 paisa, 50 paisa, रु5, रु10

Demographics
- Date of introduction: 1 January 1932; 94 years ago
- Replaced: Nepalese mohar
- Official user(s): Nepal
- Unofficial user: India (Indo-Nepal Border Cities)

Issuance
- Central bank: Nepal Rastra Bank
- Website: nrb.org.np

Valuation
- Inflation: 3.6%
- Source: Statista, 2021
- Pegged with: Indian rupee (₹) ₹1 = रु1.60 (buy), रु1.6015 (sell)

The Nepalese rupee (Nepali: नेपाली रुपैयाँ; sign: रु; code: NPR) is the official currency and legal tender of Nepal. It is also sometimes informally abbreviated as N₨ or Re./Rs. Each rupee is subdivided into 100 paisa, although coins of lower denominations are rarely used today. It is issued and regulated by the Nepal Rastra Bank, the central bank of Nepal.

The Nepalese rupee was introduced in 1932, replacing the silver-based mohar at a rate of 2 mohar = 1 rupee. Since 1994, it has been officially pegged to the Indian rupee at a rate of रु1.60 = ₹1, having previously been pegged at रु1.45 = ₹1.

In 2024, the Nepalese rupee is accepted for domestic transactions only within Nepal and is not legally circulated outside its borders. Foreign exchange is regulated by the central bank and subject to strict limits.

== History ==
The rupee was introduced in 1932, replacing the silver mohar at a rate of 2 mohar = 1 rupee. At first, the rupee was called the Mohru in Nepali.

=== The "Bullet paisa" ===
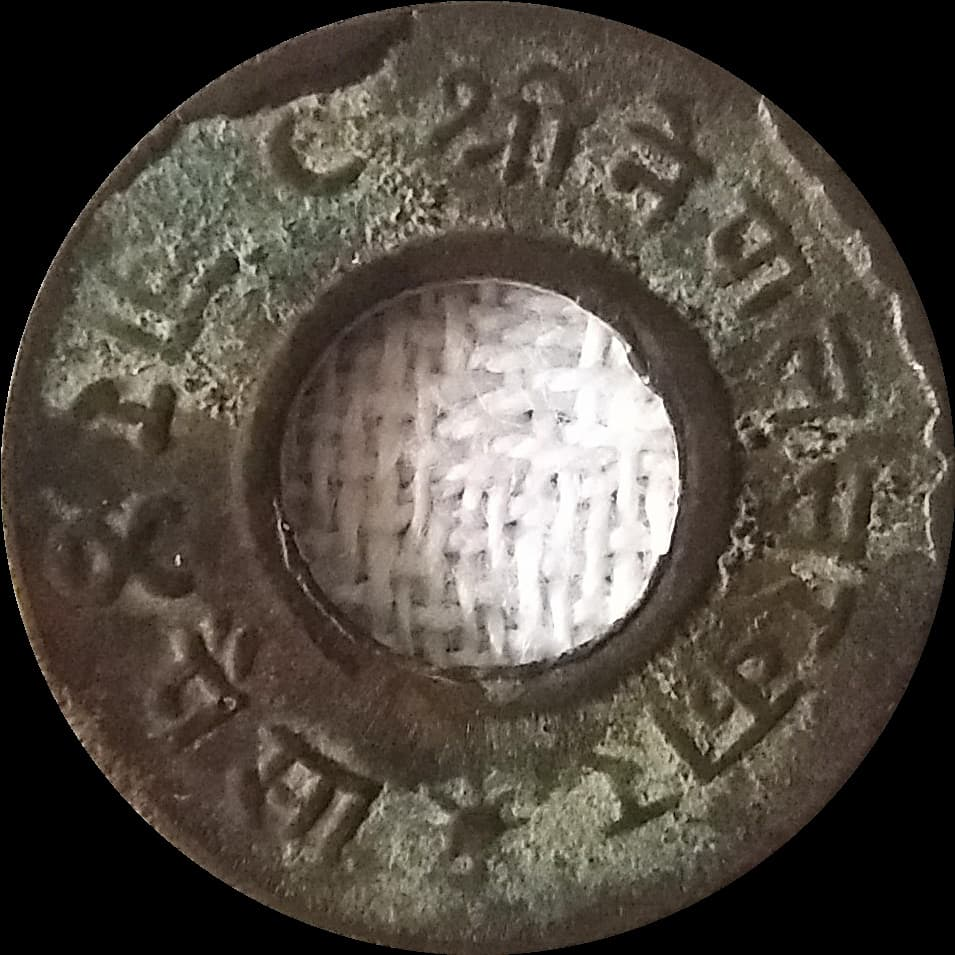
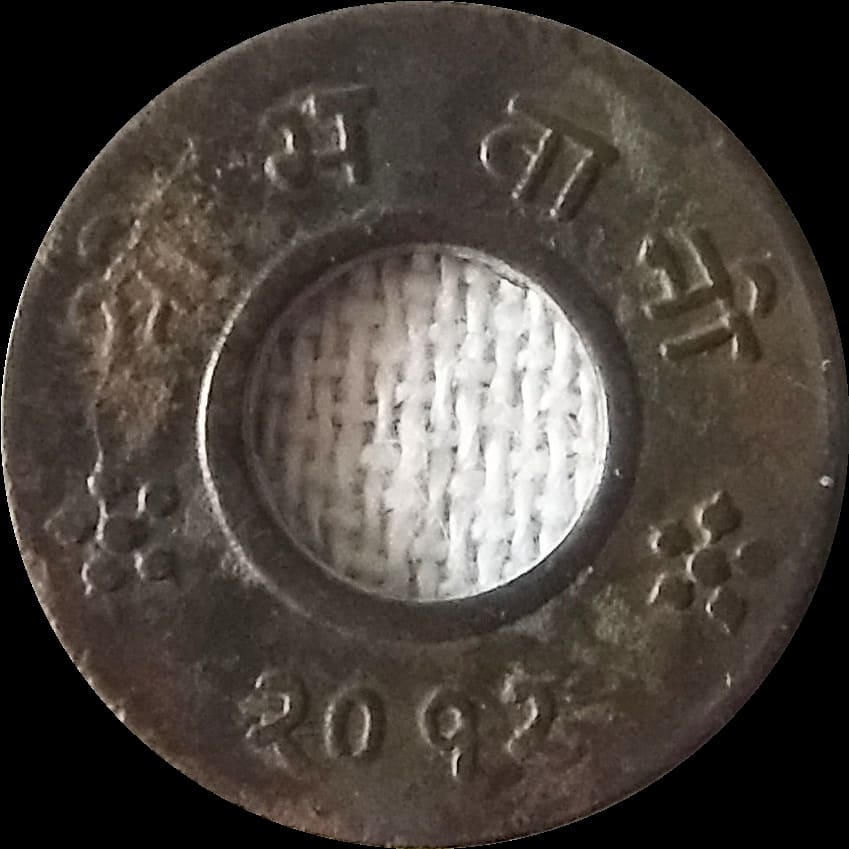
Nepal, 4 Paisa 1955 - The "Bullet paisa"

In 1955, 4 Paisa coins were minted, made from rifle cartridge cases from World War II that were used by the Gurkha soldiers who fought against the Imperial Japanese in the Pacific. The coins were produced by removing the primer from the cases and the cases were then converted into the 4 Paisa coins to commemorate the Gurkha's courage and victory during the war.

Due to the small number of cases found, these coins were minted for one year only.

They are known as the "Nepal Bullet Paisa".

=== 1972–2007 ===
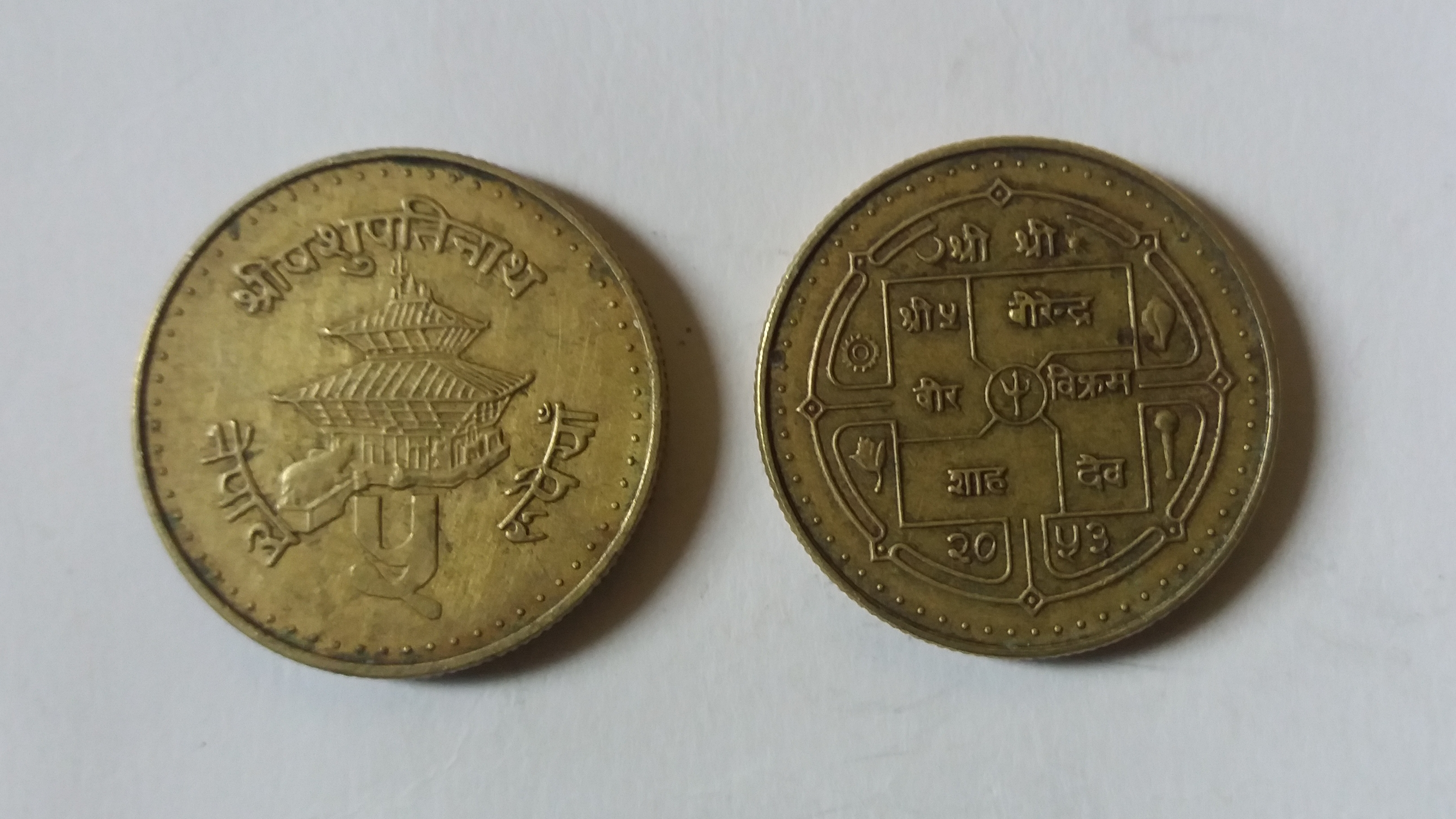
Five rupees coin (BS 2053)

During King Birendra's rule, there were two major series of banknotes. The first series featured the king wearing the military uniform, while on the notes of the second series the king was wearing the traditional Nepalese crown adorned with feathers of the bird of paradise. During this period regular banknotes of 2 and 20 rupees and special banknotes of 25 and 250 rupees were issued for the first time. The legends found on the last issues of Gyanendra revert to Nepal sarkar ("Nepalese government"), thus omitting the reference to the king.

=== 2007–present ===
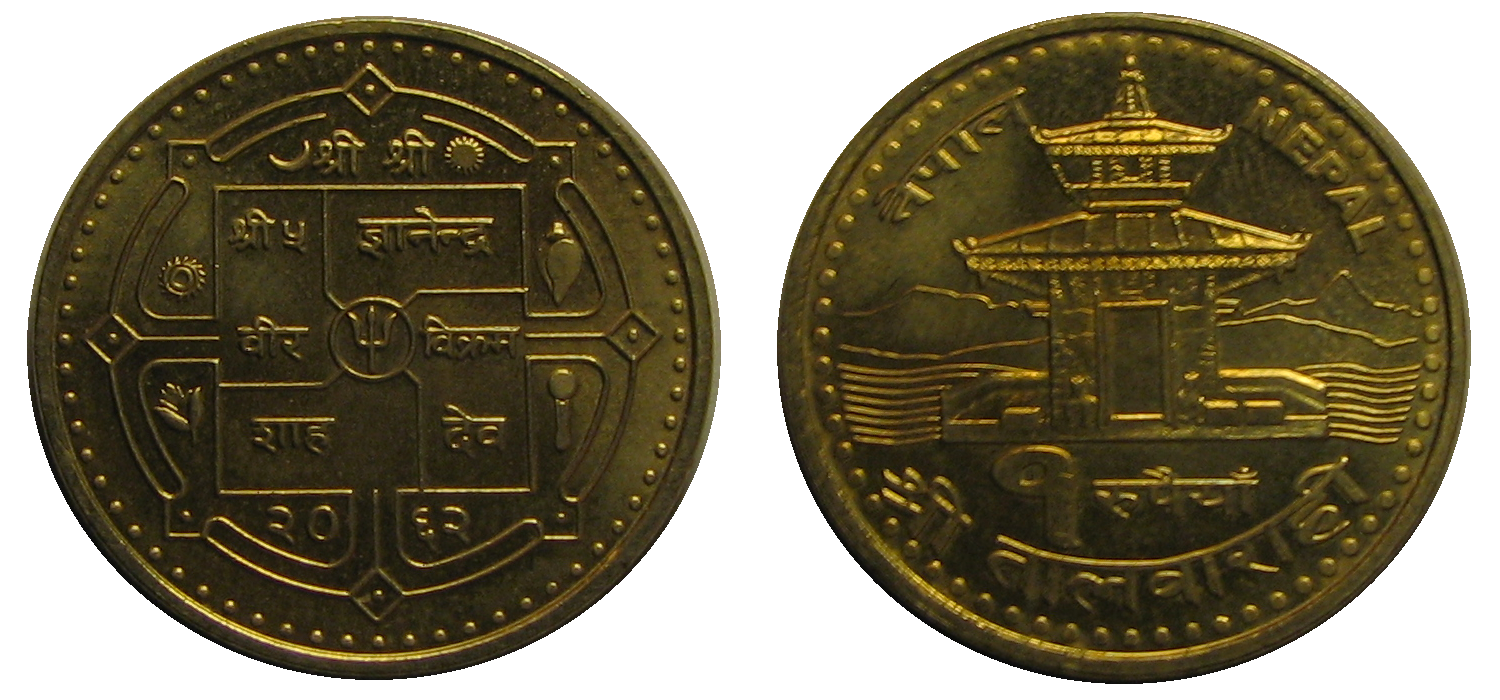
One rupee coin (2005)

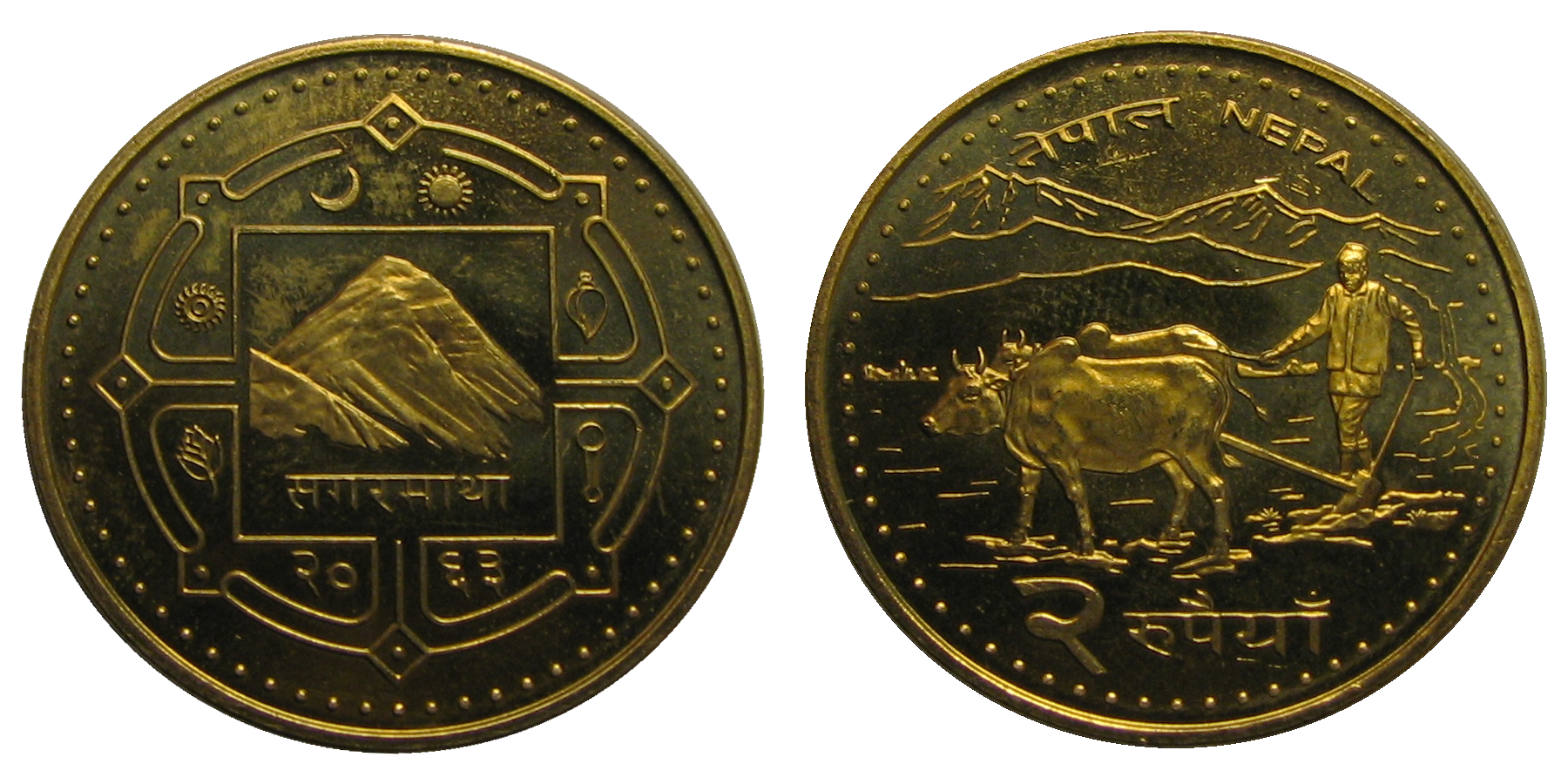
Two rupee coin (2006)

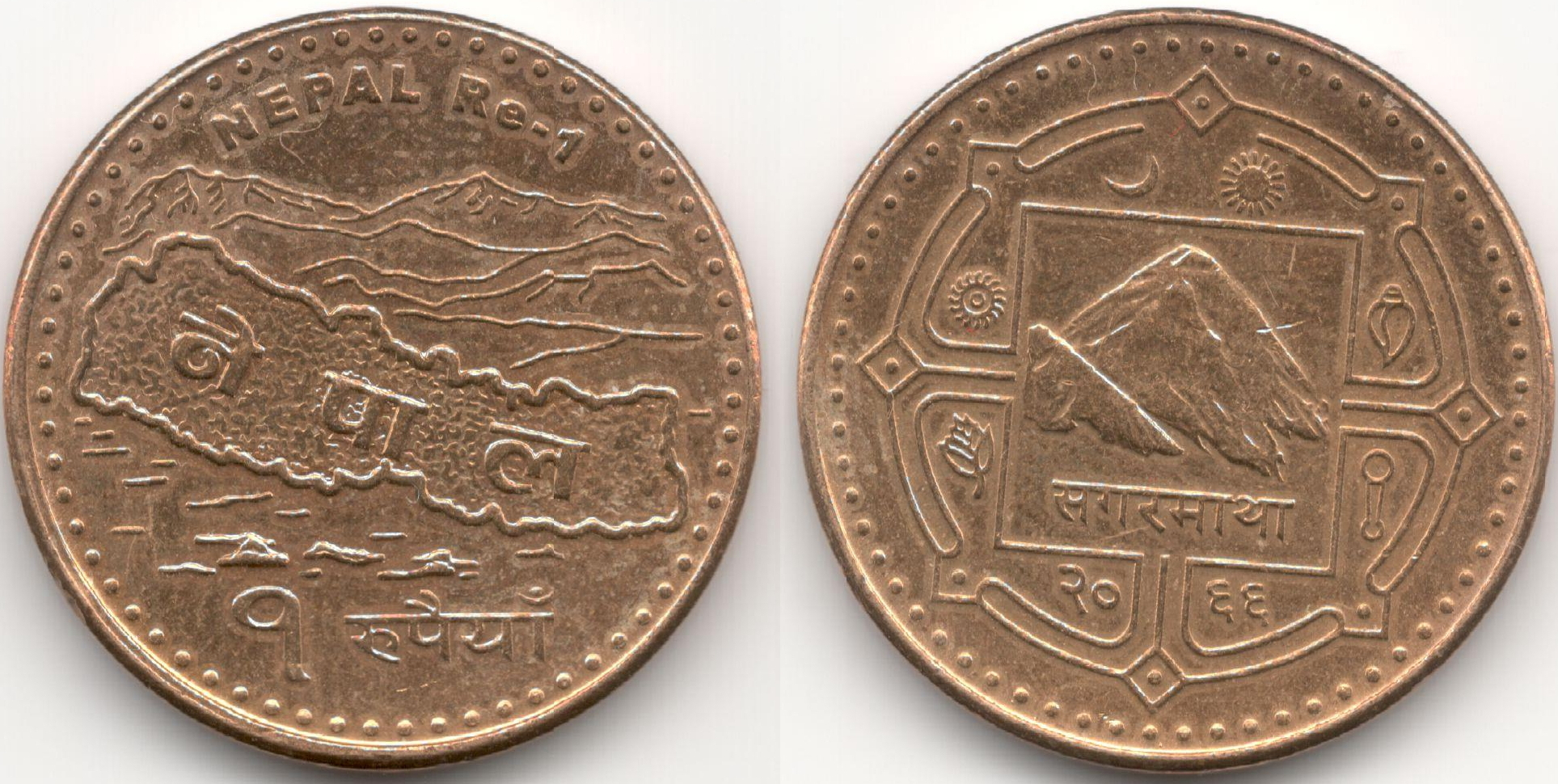
One rupee coin (2009)

In October 2007, a 500-rupee note was issued on which the king's portrait was replaced by Mount Everest. This reflects Nepal's historic change from a monarchy to a republic in May 2008. Further notes of 5, 10, 20, 50, 100 and 1000 rupees with Mount Everest and without reference to the king in their legends followed in 2008. The first issues of the 500- and 1000-rupee notes were printed on paper that still had the king's crowned portrait as a watermark in the "window" on the right part of the face of the notes. It was decided to print a red rhododendron flower (Nepal's national flower) on top of the watermark. Notes of these denominations issued in 2009 and thereafter are printed on paper that has a rhododendron flower as watermark instead of the royal portrait, and were therefore released without the additional overprint in red.

== Banknotes ==
On 17 September 1945, the government introduced banknotes for 5, 10 and 100 rupees, with the name mohru used in Nepalese. There are also 250-rupee notes commemorating the Silver Jubilee of Birendra Bir Bikram Shah in 1997. Since 2007, Nepalese rupee banknotes have been produced by Perum Peruri, the mint company of Indonesia.

In 2012, Nepal Rastra Bank issued a revised banknote series that is similar to the 2007 series, but now include inscriptions in English and the year of issue on the back.

2012 Mount Everest series (current)
Image		Value (rupees)	Main colours	Description		Date of issue
Obverse	Reverse	Value (rupees)	Main colours	Obverse	Reverse	Date of issue
		5	Lilac and pink	Mount Everest; temple of Taleju; obverse of coin	Two yaks grazing; Mount Everest	2012
		5	Lilac and pink	Mount Everest; Kasthamandap Temple	Yak	2017
		10	Brown and green	Mount Everest; Garud Narayan of Changu Narayan temple	Three blackbucks grazing; trees; bank logo	2012
		10	Brown and green	Mount Everest; Garud Narayan of Changu Narayan temple	Antelope; trees; bank logo	2017
		20	Orange and brown	Mount Everest; temple of god Krishna of Patan; Garuda atop pillar	Swamp deer; trees; mountain; bank logo	2012
		20	Orange and brown	Mount Everest; temple of god Krishna of Patan; Garuda atop pillar	Sambar deer; trees; mountain; bank logo	2016
		50	Purple, green and blue	Mount Everest; Rama-Janaki temple of Janakpur	Male tahr; mountains; bank logo	2012
		50	Purple, green and blue	Mount Everest; Rama-Janaki temple of Janakpur	Snow leopard; bank logo	2016
		100	Green and lilac	Mount Everest; Mayadevi inside silver metallic oval; map of Nepal; Ashoka pillar; wood carvings from temple of Taleju in Kathmandu; description "Lumbini – Birthplace of Lord Buddha"	One-horned rhinoceros in grassy plain; bank logo	2012
		100	Green and lilac	Mount Everest; Mayadevi inside silver metallic oval; map of Nepal; Ashoka pillar; wood carvings from temple of Taleju in Kathmandu; description "Lumbini – Birthplace of Lord Buddha"	One-horned rhinoceros and its offspring in grassy plain; bank logo	2015
		500	Brown and violet	Mount Everest; god Indra; Mount Amadablam and Thyangboche monastery; wood carvings; clouds	Two tigers drinking melted snow	2012
		500	Brown and violet	Mount Everest; god Indra; Mount Amadablam and Thyangboche monastery; wood carvings; clouds	Tiger	2016
		1,000	Blue, red and gray	Mount Everest, Swayambhunath Stupa & Harati temple	Asian elephant	2013
		1,000	Blue, red and gray	Mount Everest, Swayambhunath Stupa & Harati temple	Twin Asian elephants	2019
For table standards, see the banknote specification table.

== Exchange rates ==
Between 1857 and 1930, the Nepalese rupee (two half-rupees or mohars) was fixed at 1.28 per Indian rupee. After this period, its value fluctuated against the Indian rupee, falling to रु1.60 = ₹1 in 1939, rising to रु0.60 = ₹1 during the Second World War and falling again afterwards. In 1952, the government of Nepal officially pegged the Nepalese rupee at रु1.28 = ₹1, although the market rate remained at रु1.60 = ₹1.

Between 1955 and 1957, there was a series of soft peg revaluations that started at रु1.755 = ₹1 and appreciated to रु1.305 = ₹1 by 1957. In 1958, the government applied a new exchange rate of रु1.505 = ₹1 for the purchase of plane tickets only. A hard peg of रु1.60 = ₹1 was instituted in 1960, which was revalued to रु1.0155 = ₹1 when the Indian rupee was sharply devalued on 6 June 1966. The Indian rupee ceased to be legal tender in Nepal in 1966.

In early 1967, रु7.60 = US$1, but by December 1967 to 1975, the government pegged the Nepalese rupee against the Indian rupee, the US dollar, and gold, starting at रु1.35 = ₹1, रु10.125 = US$1 and रु1 = 0.08777g gold. By the time the gold peg was removed in 1978, the exchange rate was रु1.39075 = ₹1, रु12.50 = $1 and रु1 = 0.0808408g gold.

In 1983, the Nepali rupee's anchor was changed to a trade-weighted basket of currencies, which in practice amounted to a hard peg against the Indian rupee. This remained until 1993, when the peg was officially set at रु1.60 = ₹1.

== See also ==
- Crore
- Economy of Nepal
- Coinage of Nepal

== Sources ==
- Agrawal (Giriya), Shyam and Gyawali, Kamal Prasad: Notes and Coins of Nepal. Nepal Rastra Bank Golden Jubilee Year 2005–06, Kathmandu, 2006.
- Bertsch, Wolfgang: "The Legends on the Banknotes of Nepal", International Banknote Society (IBNS) Journal, vol. 48, no. 3, 2009, p. 39–44.
- Jha, Hari Jaya: An Overview of Nepalese Paper Money. Manjeeta Jha, Lalitpur (Patan), B.S. 2058 (= A.D. 2001).
- Krause, Chester L.; Clifford Mishler (1991). Standard Catalog of World Coins: 1801–1991 (18th ed.). Krause Publications. ISBN 0873411501.
- Lorenzoli, Giovanni: "Nepali artistic buildings as seen on Nepali notes". Journal of the International Banknote Society, vol. 43, no. 3 (2004), p. 6–14.
- Pick, Albert (1994). Bruce, Colin R. II; Shafer, Neil (eds.). Standard Catalog of World Paper Money: General Issues (7th ed.). Krause Publications. ISBN 0-87341-207-9.
- Shrestha, Ramesh: Nepalese Coins & Bank Notes (1911 to 1955). Kazi Mudhusudan Raj Bhandary, Kathmandu, 2007.
- Wittmann, Hans: Die Banknoten des. Unpublished, Wiesbaden, 2002.
