= Nepal Rastra Bank =

Central bank of Nepal

- Seal of the NRB
- Central bank of: Nepal
- Headquarters: Kathmandu, Nepal
- Coordinates: 27.7246°N 85.3086°E
- Established: Baisakh 14, 2013 B.S. (April 26, 1956; 70 years ago)
- Ownership: 100% state ownership by Government of Nepal
- Governor: Dr. Biswo Nath Poudel
- Key people: Kiran Pandit, (Deputy governor); Dirgha Rawal (Deputy governor)
- Currency: Nepalese rupee NPR (ISO 4217)
- Reserves: 18,400 million USD (11 Mar 2024)
- Website: www.nrb.org.np

The Nepal Rastra Bank (NRB) is the central Bank of Nepal and the regulatory body for all banks and financial institutions throughout Nepal. It was established on 26 April 1956 (Baisakh 14, 2013 B.S.) under the Nepal Rastra Bank Act, 1955, to perform central banking functions, including guiding the development of Nepal's financial sector. In some cases, it was called The State Bank of Nepal. The Ministry of Finance released a statement that it was called Nepal Rastra Bank in English. It now operates under the Nepal Rastra Bank Act, 2002.

Its functions include formulating monetary and foreign exchange policies to maintain market stability, issuing currency notes, regulating and supervising banks and financial institutions, and developing efficient payment and banking systems. The NRB also serves as an economic advisor to the government of Nepal and acts as the monetary, supervisory, and regulatory authority over all commercial banks, development banks, finance companies, and microfinance institutions.

The central office is located in Baluwatar, Kathmandu, and it has eight provincial offices located at Biratnagar, Janakpur, Birgunj, Pokhara, Siddharthanagar, Nepalgunj, Surkhet, and Dhangadhi.

NRB formulates and implements monetary policy, oversees foreign exchange rates and the country's foreign exchange reserves, and is one of the principal owners of the Nepal Stock Exchange. It is also a member of the Asian Clearing Union.

== History of Nepal Rastra Bank ==
The central bank of Nepal, Nepal Rastra Bank, was in fact established only after 19 years of establishment of the first bank of Nepal in 1937, Nepal Bank Ltd. Before 1956, Nepal did not have its own foreign currency reserve but rather maintained it in central bank of India. For getting the foreign currency amounts required to bear the expenses of Nepalese Embassy in London and health treatment expenses of King Tribhuvan, an application had to be submitted to the Reserve Bank of India. One of the problems that distressed Nepalese economy was the circulation of two types of currency, Nepalese and Indian simultaneously. Nepal had a dominant use of Indian rupee. Exchange rates between the Indian and Nepali currency were fixed by local traders. Seeing this as a dependence to India, King Mahendra, the son of King Tribhuvan established a central bank on April 26, 1956 in order to reduce dependence on India, replacing Indian currency being circulated in the market and strengthen the countries' sovereignty by making Nepal independent in foreign currency exchange.

After its establishment, before operating accounts of any other banks in Nepal, Nepal Rastra bank opened its first bank account in the Reserve Bank of India. To open its bank account in Reserve Bank of India, the then Governor Himalaya Shumsher JB Rana sent a letter to then India's secretary of economic affairs, Braj Kumar Nehru and in the direction of Nehru, the first account of NRB was opened there. Subsequently, NRB opened its account in another bank in India and then in one bank of London.

The early banknotes issued during the rule of King Tribhuvan were not circulated by a Central Bank but rather were initially held by His Majesty's Government, then called the Government of Nepal, through the "Sadar Muluki khana" (Central Treasury) from September 1945 through February 1960 and were signed by a Kajanchi (head of the treasury). After, this the responsibility was handed over to the NRB. For this purpose, the NRB had set up the Note Department in September 1956 which was renamed as the Currency Management Department in November 2002. On February 19, 1960, NRB released its first bank notes in the denomination of Mohru 1. The signature on the bank notes were replaced by the governors of central bank rather than the head of treasury in all bank notes issued in the country after this date.

Initially, the Central Bank of Nepal was founded under the Nepal Rastra Bank Act, 1955 which stated that the primary responsibility of the bank was to ensure "proper management for the issuance of the Nepalese currency notes". Later, the Foreign Exchange Regulation Act, 1963 enacted, NRB as the custodian of foreign exchange reserves of the country. Nepal’s choice for a fixed exchange rate with Indian Currency along with supporting government policies contributed significantly to stabilizing confidence in both the domestic currency and in exchange rate among the local traders. Additionally, during this decade, the national policy of relations with foreign institution were implemented which created the foundation for membership with international organization such as the International Monetary Fund (IMF) and the World Bank (WB) in 1961. Because of these policies, Nepal Rastra bank succeeded in the circulation of the new Nepalese rupee as the legal tender in Nepal's Terai region which was predominated by Indian currencies and facilitated the elimination of the dual currency period in 1964 in the country and making Nepal independent in foreign currency exchange. Before 1956, Nepal's foreign exchange reserves were held in Indian banks. As of now, Nepal's foreign exchange reserves are held by the NRB itself. Only a certain percentage of foreign exchange reserves is held by other banks.

In 1974, NRB became the founding member Asian Clearing Union (ACU), with headquarters in Tehran, Iran. However, this payment system does perform settlement for payment between Nepal and India.

The financial sector reform based on the Financial Sector Strategy Paper that Government of Nepal publicly announced on 22 November 2000 enacted Nepal Rastra Bank Act, 2002 under which the bank is running till date. The act states its primary responsibility as "to take necessary decisions with regard to the denominations of bank notes and coins, the figures, size, metal, materials for printing notes and other materials, and to frame appropriate policies with regard to their issue." Under this act, NRB formulated its first monetary policy in the fiscal year 2002/03, 46 years after its establishment. The central bank has been formulating monetary policy every year since then to help in the implementation of the government's annual policy and budget plan and to maintain financial stability.

the International Finance Corporation (IFC) and Nepal Rastra Bank collaborate

International Finance Corporation (IFC) is a division of World Bank Group, and the central bank of Nepal is called Nepal Rastra Bank. They collaborate to develop and work on specific projects. Those projects mainly help to establish environmental and social risk management protocols. They aim to increase portfolio investment, enhance competitiveness within different parts of areas, encourage business investment and opportunities, and improve risk management practices by reducing the risk of financial situations and facilitating more approaches to finance social and environmental businesses. Under the supervision of IFC, Nepal Rastra Bank provides support to financial institutions in different areas of Nepal through applying various social and environmental rules, regulations, and guidelines. Later day the workshop was held on Kathmandu to facilitate discussion among government officials and different characteristic financial institutions and global organizations. During this period, risk management capabilities have been increased in the different financial organization.

Nepal Rastra Bank's Deputy Governor highlighted the value of financial institutions participating to create robust environmental and social management frameworks to manage risks and support environmentally friendly businesses. Aiming to maximize advantages of its membership in IFC's Sustainable Banking Network (SBN), Nepal Rastra Bank attempts to find green investment and standardize sustainable finance policies. IFC's Representative says that attention to the opportunity for financial institutions to build up their portfolios by conducting thorough risk assessments, accenting on environmental and social factors. Nepal, a most important country for IFC, remains a focus for sustainable energy access, financial inclusion, tourism infrastructure development, and job creation. As of June 30, 2016, IFC's investment portfolio in Nepal was greater than $50 million.

== List of Governors ==
| No. | Governor | In office |
|---|---|---|
| 1 | Himalayan Shumsher J.B. Rana | April 26, 1956 – February 7, 1961 |
| 2 | Laxmi Nath Gautam | February 8, 1961 – June 17, 1965 |
| 3 | Pradyuma Lal Rajbhandari | June 18, 1965 – August 13, 1966 |
| 4 | Bhekh Bahadur Thapa | August 14, 1966 – July 26, 1967 |
| 5 | Yadav Pant | April 24, 1968 – April 28, 1973 |
| 6 | Kul Shekhar Sharma | April 29, 1973 – December 12, 1978 |
| 7 | Kalyana Bikram Adhikary | June 13, 1979 – December 8, 1984 |
| 8 | Ganesh Bahadur Thapa | March 25, 1985 – May 22, 1990 |
| 9 | Hari Shankar Tripathi | August 10, 1990 – January 17, 1995 |
| 10 | Satyendra Pyara Shrestha | January 18, 1995 – January 17, 2000 |
| 11 | Tilak Bahadur Rawal | January 18, 2000 – January 17, 2005 |
| 12 | Deependra Purush Dhakal | August 29, 2000 – April 27, 2001 |
| 13 | Bijaya Nath Bhattarai | January 31, 2005 – January 30, 2010 |
| 14 | Deependra Bahadur Kshetry | January 15, 2009 – July 26, 2009 |
| 15 | Yuba Raj Khatiwada | March 22, 2010 – March 19, 2015 |
| 16 | Chiranjibi Nepal | March 19, 2015 – April 6, 2020 |
| 17 | Maha Prasad Adhikari | April 6, 2020 – April 5, 2025 |
| 18 | Dr. Biswo Nath Poudel | May 20, 2025 – |

=== Board of directors ===
As per the Nepal Rastra Bank Act, 2002, Nepal Rastra Bank Board of Directors has seven members. The Governor of the bank chairs the Board of Directors. The Governor, Deputy Governors and other Directors are appointed by the Government of Nepal (Council of Ministers) for a term of five years.

| No. | Name | Position | Member Since |
|---|---|---|---|
| 1 | Dr. Biswo Nath Poudel (Governor) | Chairman | May 20, 2025 |
| 2 | Mr. Ghanashyam Upadhyaya (Secretary, Ministry of Finance) | Member | February 13, 2025 |
| 3 | Mr. Kiran Pandit (Deputy Governor) | Member | April 7, 2026 |
| 4 | Mr. Dirgha Bahadur Rawal (Deputy Governor) | Member | August 19, 2026 |
| 5 | Dr. Ravindra Prasad Pandey | Member | May 11, 2023 |
| 6 | Mr.Chinta Mani Siwakoti | Member | May 20, 2022 |
| 7 | Dr. Shankar Prasad Acharya | Member | May 20, 2022 |

== Publications ==
A report titled "Current Macro-Economic and Financial Situation" is published monthly, as required by the Nepal Rastra Bank Act, 2002. The report sums up trends and developments throughout the financial sector. Starting in 2004, the central Bank of Nepal publishes Economic Bulletin every three months. It also publishes yearly report since 2003 according to the Nepal Rastra Bank Act, 2002. Since 1987, the central bank has been releasing journal named economic review citing the research done on various economic and financial fields of the country. It also published monthly, quarterly and yearly newsletters. On special occasion such as anniversary, NRB also releases special data citing history, trends, future etc. NRB also performs various research which it publishes regularly.

== See also ==
- List of central banks
- List of financial supervisory authorities by country
