= List of companies of Nepal =

Location of Nepal

Nepal is a landlocked central Himalayan country in South Asia. It has a population of 29 million and is the 93rd largest country by area. Kathmandu is the nation's capital and largest city.

Nepal's gross domestic product (GDP) for 2024 was estimated at over $43 billion (adjusted to nominal GDP). In 2010, agriculture accounted for 36.1%, services comprised 48.5%, and industry 15.4% of Nepal's GDP. While agriculture and industry are contracting, the contribution by the service sector is increasing.

For further information on the types of business entities in this country and their abbreviations, see "Business entities in Nepal".

== Notable firms ==
This list includes notable companies with primary headquarters located in the country. The industry and sector follow the Industry Classification Benchmark taxonomy. Organizations which have ceased operations are included and noted as defunct.

Notable companies Status: P=Private, S=State; A=Active, D=Defunct
Name	Industry	Sector	Headquarters	Founded	Notes	Status	
Agni Air	Consumer services	Airlines	Kathmandu	2006	Airline, defunct 2013	P	D
Agriculture Development Bank	Financials	Banks	Kathmandu	1968	Bank, rural credit institution	S	A
Air Nepal International	Consumer services	Airlines	Kathmandu	2005	Airline, defunct 2006	P	D
Asian Airlines	Consumer services	Airlines	Kathmandu	2002	Airline, defunct 2006	P	D
Bajeko Sekuwa	Consumer services	Restaurants & bars	Kathmandu	1976	Restaurant chain	P	A
Base Air	Consumer services	Airlines	Kathmandu	2004	Airline, defunct 2007	P	A
Bhatbhateni supermarket	Consumer services	Retail Chain	Kathmandu	1984		P	A
Buddha Air	Consumer services	Airlines	Jawalakhel	1997	Domestic airline	P	A
Chaudhary Group	Conglomerates	-	Kathmandu	1968	Consumer goods, financials, industrials	P	A
Cosmic Air	Consumer services	Airlines	Kathmandu	1997	Airline, defunct 2008	P	D
Deurali-Janta Pharmaceuticals	Health care	Pharmaceuticals	Kathmandu	1988	Pharma	P	A
Dish Home	Consumer services	Broadcasting & entertainment	Lalitpur	2010	Satellite	P	A
Everest Air	Consumer services	Airlines	Kathmandu	1992	Airline, defunct 1998	P	D
Fly Yeti	Consumer services	Airlines	Kathmandu	2007	Low-cost airline, defunct 2008	P	D
Flying Dragon Airlines	Consumer services	Airlines	Nepalgunj	2005	Airline	P	A
Giribandhu Tea Estate	Consumer goods	Food products	Birtamod	1962	Tea	P	A
Golyan Group	Conglomerates	-	Kathmandu	1960	Agriculture, Hospitality, Manufacturing, Renewable Energy	P	A
Gorkha Airlines	Consumer services	Airlines	Kathmandu	1996	Charter airline	P	A
Guna Airlines	Consumer services	Airlines	Kathmandu	2009	Airline, defunct 2013	P	D
Himalayan Bank	Financials	Banks	Kathmandu	1993	Private sector bank	P	A
Hulas Motors	Consumer goods	Automobiles	Biratnagar	1996		P	A
IMS Group Nepal	Conglomerates	-	Kathmandu	1993	Mobile phones, Consumer Goods, Automobiles, Real estate	P	A
Impro Airways	Consumer services	Airlines	Kathmandu	2006	Helicopter airline, defunct 2010	P	D
Karnali Air	Consumer services	Airlines	Kathmandu	?	Airline, defunct 2003	P	D
Krishna Pauroti	Consumer goods	Food products	Kathmandu	1948	Bakery	P	A
Laxmi Bank	Financials	Banks	Kathmandu	2002	Commercial bank	P	A
Makalu Air	Consumer services	Airlines	Nepalgunj	2009	Airline	P	A
Mountain Air	Consumer services	Airlines	Kathmandu	2000	Airline, defunct 2002	P	D
Nabil Bank	Financials	Banks	Kathmandu	1984	Commercial bank	P	A
Ncell	Telecommunications	Mobile telecommunications	Lalitpur	2004	GSM	P	A
Necon Air	Consumer services	Airlines	Kathmandu	1992	Airline, defunct 2003	P	D
Nepal Airlines	Consumer services	Airlines	Kathmandu	1958	Flag carrier airline	S	A
Nepal Bangladesh Bank	Financials	Banks	Kathmandu	1994	Commercial bank	P	A
Nepal Bank Limited	Financials	Banks	Kathmandu	1937	State-owned bank	S	A
Nepal Investment Bank	Financials	Banks	Kathmandu	1986	Commercial bank	P	A
Nepal Oil Corporation	Oil & gas	Exploration & production	Kathmandu	1970	State owned petro concern	S	A
Nepal Railway Company Limited	Industrials	Railroads	Janakpur	1927	Railroads	S	A
Nepal Rastra Bank	Financials	Banks	Kathmandu	1956	Central bank	S	A
Nepal SBI Bank	Financials	Banks	Kathmandu	1992	Joint venture bank with State Bank of India	P	A
Nepal Stock Exchange	Financials	Investment services	Kathmandu	1993	Primary exchange	S	A
Nepal Telecom	Telecommunications	Fixed line telecommunications	Kathmandu	1913	State telecom provider	S	A
NIDC Development Bank	Financials	Banks	Kathmandu	1959	Industrial bank	P	A
Rastriya Banijya Bank	Financials	Banks	Kathmandu	1966	State-owned commercial bank	S	A
Ratna Pustak Bhandar	Consumer services	Specialty retailers	Kathmandu	1946	Books	P	A
Rastriya Beema Sansthan	Financials	Full line insurance	Kathmandu	1967	Insurance	S	A
Shangri-La Air	Consumer services	Airlines	Kathmandu	1999	Airline, merged with Necon Air in 2001	P	D
Shree Airlines	Consumer services	Airlines	Kathmandu	1999	Charter helicopter airline	P	A
Sita Air	Consumer services	Airlines	Kathmandu	2003	Airline	P	A
Skyline Airways	Consumer services	Airlines	Kathmandu	1999	Airline, defunct 2003	P	D
SmartCell	Telecommunications	Mobile telecommunications	Lalitpur	2008	GSM	P	A
Standard Chartered Nepal	Financials	Banks	Kathmandu	1987	Bank, significant subsidiary of Standard Chartered (UK)	P	A
Subisu	Telecommunications	Fixed line telecommunications	Kathmandu	1999	Cable Internet	P	A
Tara Air	Consumer services	Airlines	Kathmandu	2009	Airline	P	A
Vianet	Telecommunications	Fixed line telecommunications	Kathmandu	1999	Internet and network service provider	P	A
WorldLink	Telecommunications	Fixed line telecommunications	Kathmandu	1995	Internet and network service provider	P	A
Yeti Airlines	Consumer services	Airlines	Kathmandu	1998	Airline	P	A

The Mountain Museum in Pokhara, a hub of tourism in Nepal.

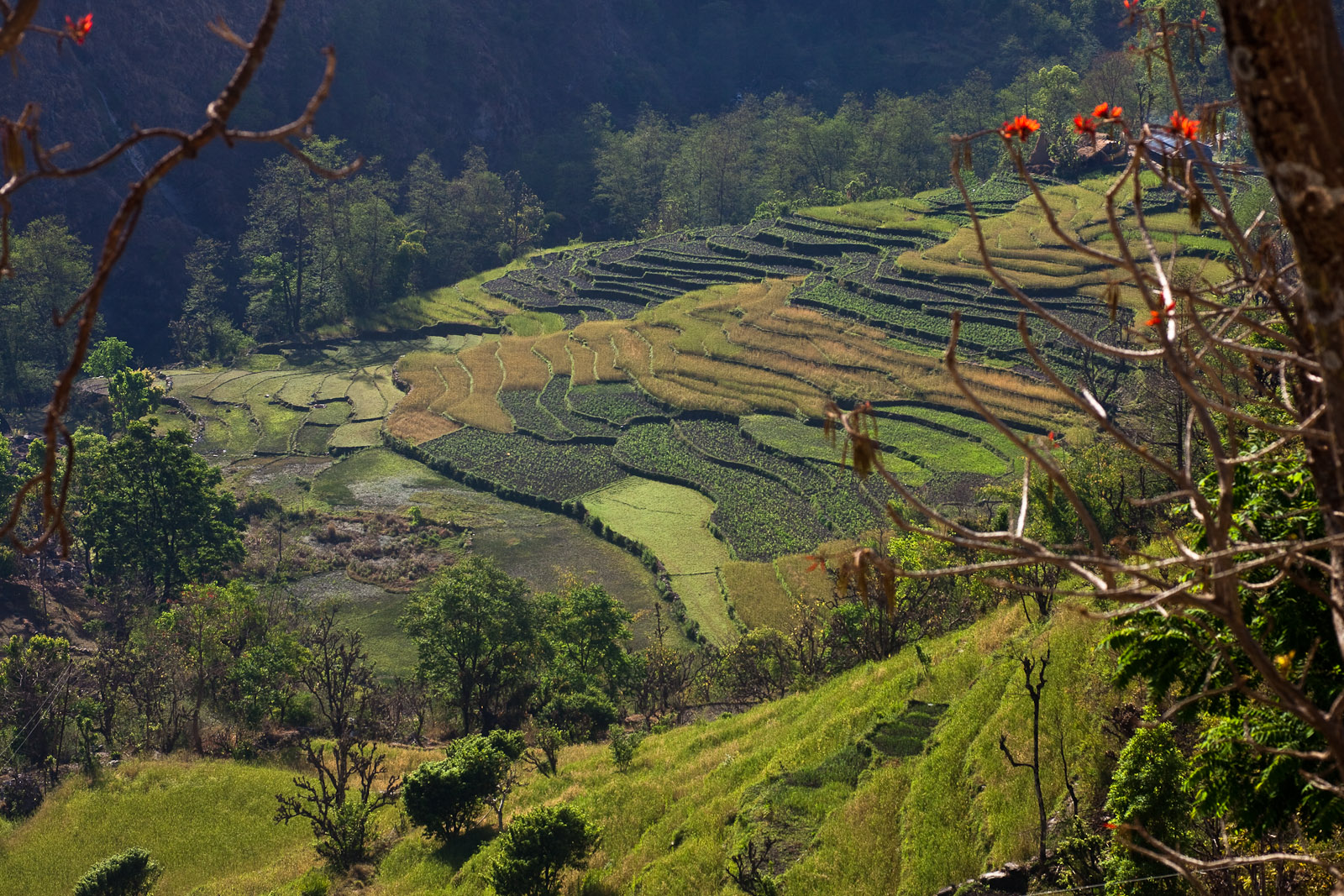
Terraced rice farming in Nepal.

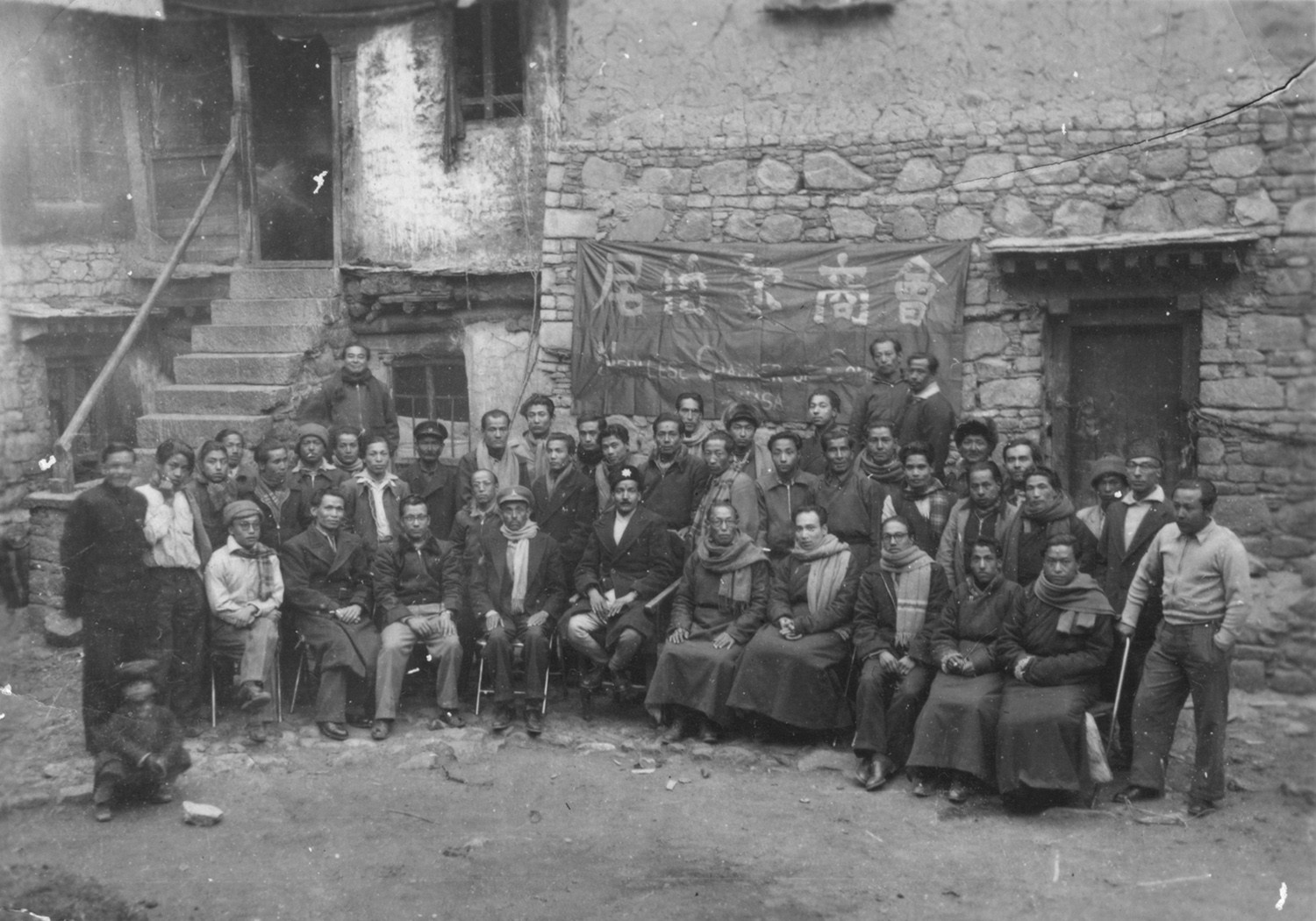
Nepalese Chamber of Commerce, Lhasa, 1955.

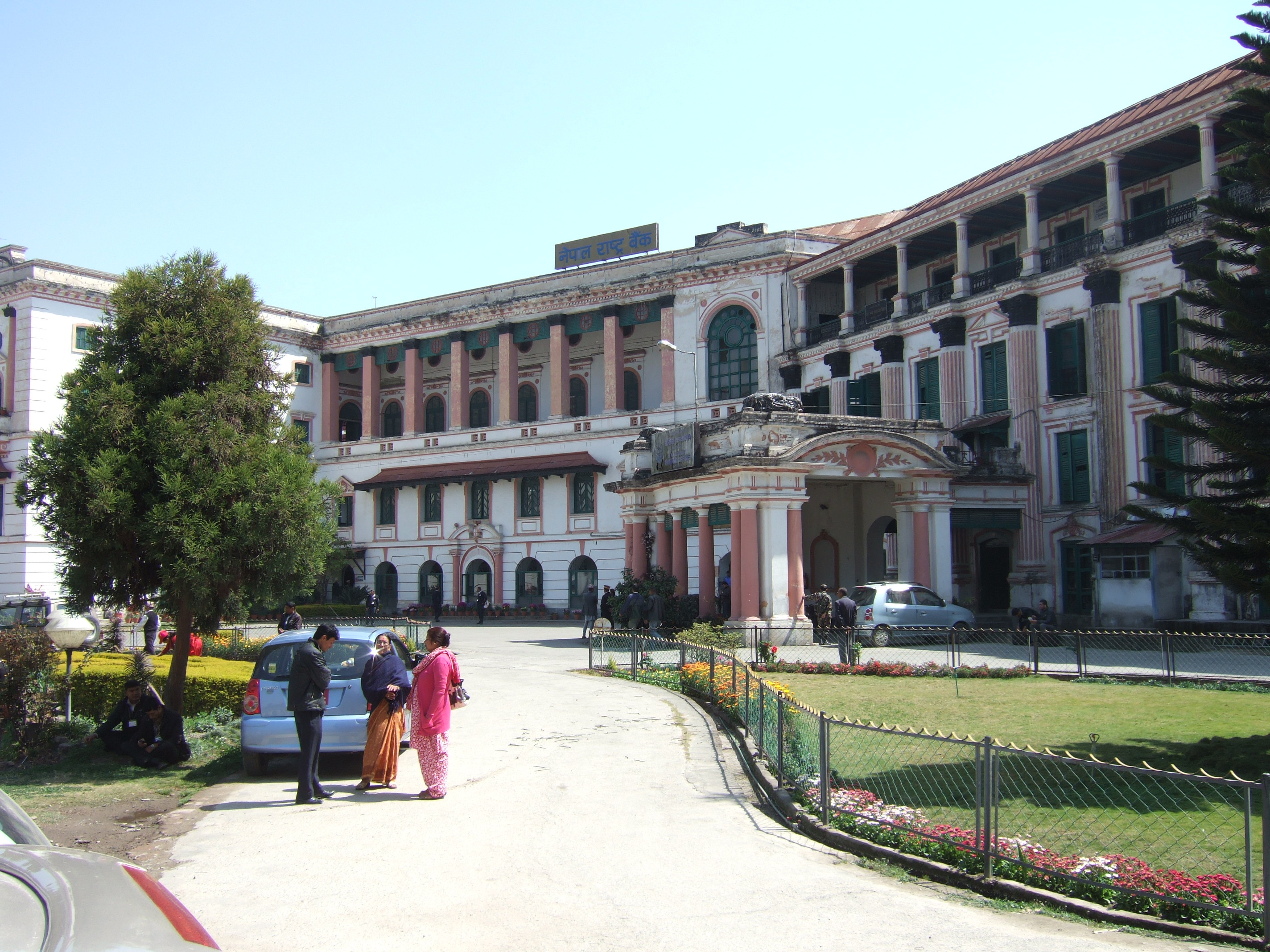
Nepal Rastra Bank in Kathmandu.

== See also ==
- List of airlines of Nepal
- List of banks in Nepal
- List of industrial estates in Nepal
- List of Top IT Companies in Nepal
