= Giri Bandhu Tea Estate Corruption =

Corruption Case in Nepal

Giri Bandhu Tea Estate scandal
- Date: Roots in 1960s; major developments 2020–present
- Location: Jhapa District, Koshi Province, Nepal
- Type: Corruption, Political scandal
- Cause: Attempts to illegally swap and sell land exempted under land reform laws for real estate development.
- Participants: Giri Bandhu Tea Estate Pvt. Ltd. owners, KP Sharma Oli and his government, land brokers (e.g., Deepak Malhotra), Advocate Om Prakash Aryal, Supreme Court of Nepal, various political parties.
- Outcome: Supreme Court of Nepal annulled government's land swap approval (Feb 2024).; Government attempted to bypass ruling via ordinance (Jan 2025).; Contempt of court proceedings initiated.; Land status remains contentious; political and legal battles ongoing.

The Giri Bandhu Tea Estate scandal is a long-running corruption and political scandal in Nepal concerning the alleged misuse and illegal attempts to swap and sell land originally allocated to the Giri Bandhu Tea Estate in Birtamod, Jhapa District. Established in the 1960s, the estate became the focus of controversy due to efforts by its owners, allegedly in collusion with political figures and land brokers, to convert its valuable land, protected under land reform laws, into commercial real estate for substantial profit. The scandal involves allegations of "policy corruption," where laws were purportedly amended to facilitate the deal, and subsequent attempts to undermine a Supreme Court of Nepal ruling that nullified the land swap.

== Background ==
The origins of the scandal trace back to the Panchayat era in the 1960s. In 1964 (2021 BS), Nepal enacted the Land Reform Act, which imposed ceilings on land ownership, one of which is for example is maximum of 10 bighas per person in the Tarai plains. To circumvent these reforms, some landlords registered large landholdings as tea estates, which were exempted as "industrial" land. Budhkaran Rajbansi and the Giri brothers (Prem Kumar, Krishna Kumar, and Trilochan Giri) established tea estates in Jhapa around this time. On December 25, 1964, a Nepal Gazette notice granted Giri Bandhu Tea Estate an exemption for approximately 343 bighas (around 232 hectares) on the condition that the land be used solely for tea cultivation and could not be bought, sold, or leased for other purposes. The estate operated on a total of about 500 bighas under this exemption.

Over decades, these land privileges were maintained. However, portions of the estate's land were sold off with government approval:

- On May 22, 1995, during the CPN-UML government led by Manmohan Adhikari, 51 bighas were approved for sale.
- On June 11, 2003, under Prime Minister Surya Bahadur Thapa during King Gyanendra Shah's direct rule, another 19 bighas were sold.

This totalled 70 bighas, much of which was rapidly urbanized as part of Birtamod town, featuring a bus park, a college, businesses, and residences for around 400 families on over 1,153 plots.

By the late 2010s, with approximately 280 bighas remaining, the land's value in the expanding Birtamod market had soared, estimated at Rs 200,000 to Rs 3,000,000 per square meter in prime locations. This led to a plan by the estate owners and land brokers to swap this valuable land for cheaper, rural land elsewhere in Jhapa (e.g., Kachankawal or Jhapa Rural Municipality), thereby freeing the Birtamod land for sale.

== Land swap scheme and legal changes ==
A critical development occurred in January 2020 (2076 BS) when the government of Prime Minister KP Sharma Oli enacted the Eighth Amendment to the Land Management Act, 1964 (Land Related Act, 2076 BS). This amendment introduced provisions allowing land held by companies above the ceiling to be relocated, exchanged, or sold to pay off liabilities. Critics, including then-Mayor of Kathmandu Balendra Shah, later termed this "policy corruption," alleging the law was tailored to benefit the Giri Bandhu estate and facilitate the land swap.

On April 26, 2021, the Oli-led Cabinet approved the Giri Bandhu land swap, permitting the estate to exchange 343.19 bighas of its Jhapa land for parcels elsewhere in Province 1. This decision was justified by proponents as aiding a tea company in "liquidation," but investigators and critics alleged it was a cover to enrich an interest group involving the estate owners and land brokers, notably including businessman Deepak Malhotra.

== Legal challenge and Supreme Court intervention ==
In May 2021, Advocate Om Prakash Aryal and others filed a writ petition at the Supreme Court of Nepal, challenging the Cabinet's decision as unconstitutional and an instance of political corruption.

On February 7, 2024, the Constitutional Bench of the Supreme Court delivered a landmark verdict, annulling the Oli government's land swap decision. The Court ruled that the decision was "immature" and contravened Section 12(c) of the Land Act, 1964, and other legal provisions. It reaffirmed that land held above the legal ceiling under an exemption must revert to state ownership if not used for the specified purpose (tea cultivation). The Court issued a writ of certiorari to cancel the swap and a writ of mandamus directing the government to take necessary steps to bring the Giri Bandhu estate land exceeding the ceiling under government ownership. The full text of the verdict was released on May 12, 2024.

== Political Developments and Allegations of Cover-Up ==
The Supreme Court's verdict triggered significant political debate.

- Balendra Shah, Mayor of Kathmandu, publicly lauded the verdict and accused KP Oli of orchestrating a "Rs 100 billion scam," challenging him to return alleged advance payments from land buyers.
- The Nepali Congress (NC), then in opposition, demanded a parliamentary probe.
- UML leaders, including Yogesh Bhattarai, defended the government's actions, claiming broad political consensus for the enabling legislation, a claim disputed by NC's Bishwa Prakash Sharma who cited prior objections by NC lawmakers.
- Pushpa Kamal Dahal, then Prime Minister, had pledged in August 2023 to investigate the deal. After being ousted in 2024, he claimed his government fell because he was probing such corruption cases.

=== 2025 Ordinance and Contempt of Court ===
In July 2024, a new coalition government was formed by the CPN-UML and Nepali Congress, with KP Sharma Oli returning as Prime Minister. On January 10, 2025 (promulgated January 15), this government issued an ordinance amending 29 laws. This ordinance included provisions allowing real estate companies to hold land beyond statutory ceilings and permitting estates like Giri Bandhu to sell or mortgage land above the legal ceiling. Critics viewed this as a direct attempt to bypass the Supreme Court's verdict and legalize the controversial land transactions.

In response, on February 10, 2025, Advocate Om Prakash Aryal filed a contempt of court petition against the Prime Minister's Office and the Ministry of Land Management, Cooperatives and Poverty Alleviation (MoLMCPA), arguing that the ordinance obstructed the implementation of the Supreme Court's verdict. The Supreme Court registered the petition and initiated proceedings.

In May 2025, the government tabled a Land (Amendment) Bill in Parliament to replace the ordinance, which opposition parties like the Janata Samajbadi Party (JSP) claimed was virtually identical to the ordinance and designed to serve land mafias. The bill faced resistance and reportedly stalled in the National Assembly by April 2025 due to the controversy.

=== Allegations of Political Quid Pro Quo ===
There were also allegations that Rabi Lamichhane, leader of the Rastriya Swatantra Party (RSP) and then Home Minister, remained inactive on the Giri Bandhu case as part of a political understanding with the UML to secure leniency in his own legal matters. These claims were denied by some RSP figures, with RSP Joint Spokesperson Manish Jha stating the party favored an investigation.

== See also ==
- Corruption in Nepal
- Supreme Court of Nepal
