= Asian Trekking =

Adventure travel company

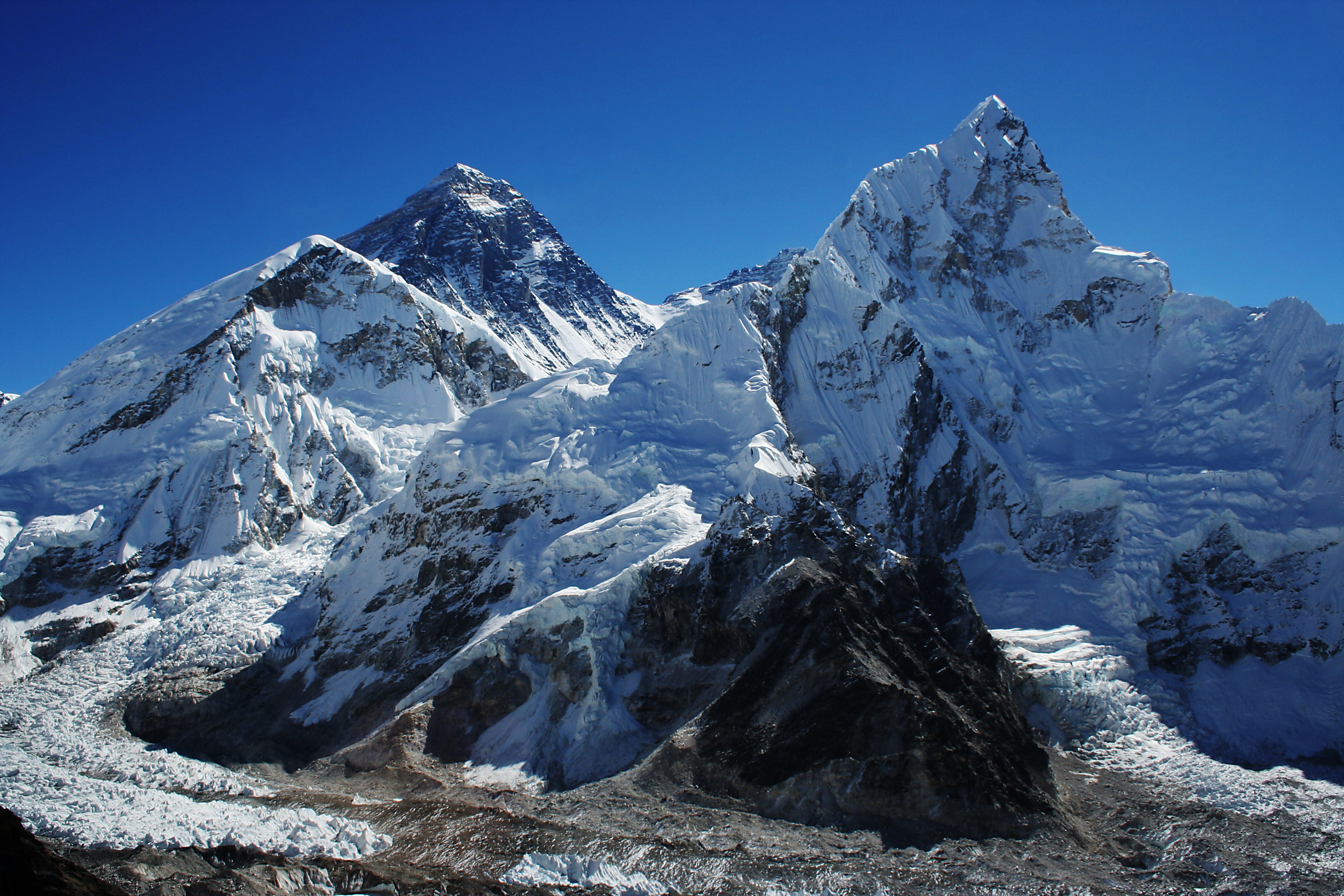
Everest towers over its western shoulder, the Khumbu icefall, and on the right Nuptse

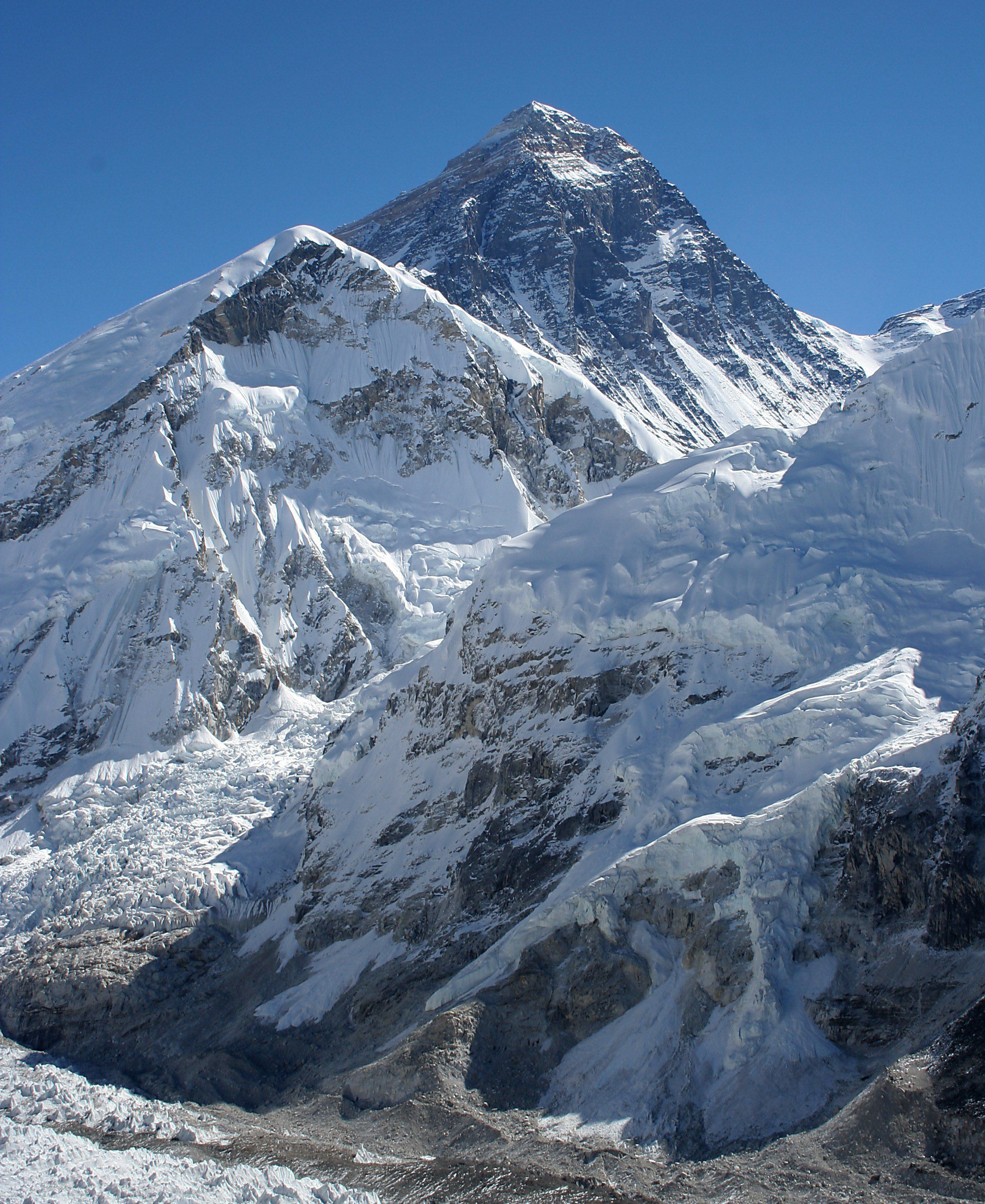
Closer view of Everest and its western shoulder

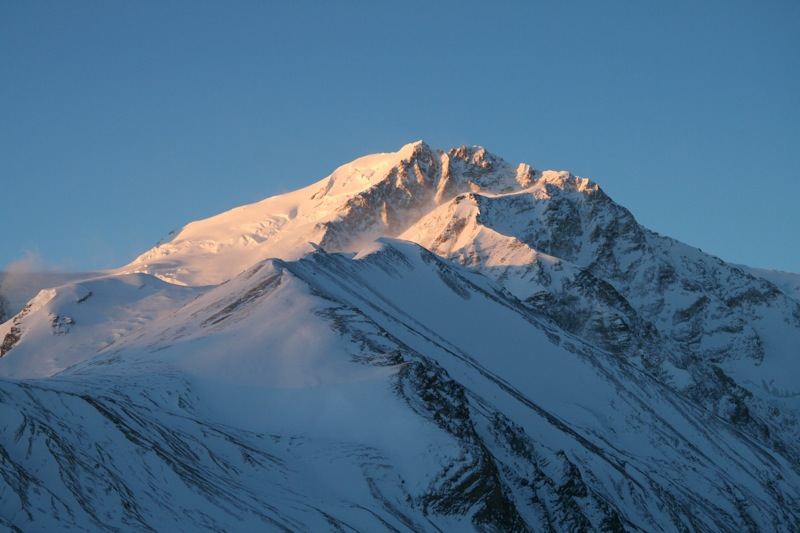
Chinese Tibet's Shishapangma

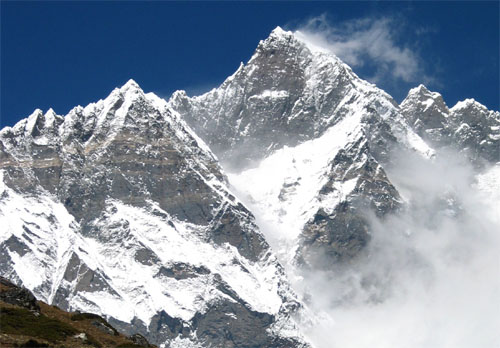
Lhotse

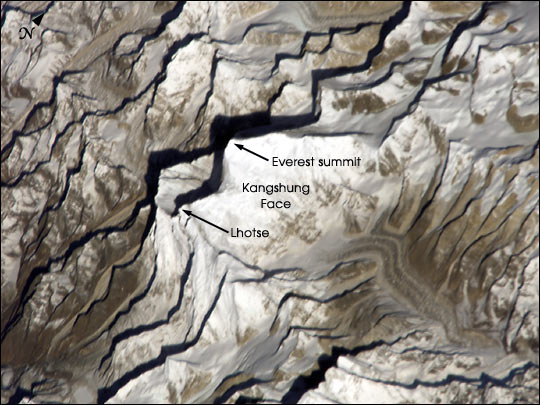
Lhotse and Everest peaks from space (their eastern side)

Asian Trekking is a Nepal-based adventure company, specializing in mountaineering expeditions and trekking in the Himalayas. Started in 1982 by UIAA Honorary Member Ang Tshering Sherpa, it is Nepal's oldest mountaineering and trekking company still in operation. In 2008, Tshering's son Dawa Steven Sherpa, an environmentalist and mountaineer, took leadership of the company.

Asian Trekking offers expedition support services. According to the Himalayan Database, Asian Trekking has organized 889 mountaineering expeditions in Nepal and Tibet, including 284 expeditions on Mount Everest.

== Overview ==
Asian Trekking facilitates the climbs of many summits, including Mount Everest. The company offers trekking and climbing packages, expert guides, and logistical support to clients. Amongst its accolades, it has successfully guided: the world's oldest female on the summit of Everest; the first blind Asian man on Everest; the first double summit of Mount Everest in one season (from Nepal and Tibet); the first ascent of Mt. Burke Khang (6942 meters) and Dragmarpo Ri.

Asian Trekking claims to have a commitment to sustainable tourism and environmental conservation. The company has been involved in initiatives aimed at preserving the fragile Himalayan ecosystem and supporting local communities. Asian Trekking has organized the clean up of over 25,000 kg of garbage from the slopes of Mount Everest. During the COVID-19 pandemic, Asian Trekking partnered with the Swiss luxury brand Bally to attempt to clean the base camps of all 8000 meters peaks in Nepal.

== History ==
In 1982, new businesses were only allowed to be established by those who were close to the royal palace or top government bureaucrats. However, Ang Tshering was advised by an expedition cook that a newly registered trekking company was for sale. These circumstances allowed Tshering to essentially start his own 'new' company.

After two years of organizing treks up other mountains in the region, such as Dhaulagiri, Asian Trekking organized its first expedition up Mount Everest. Ever since, Asian Trekking has organized treks up Mount Everest every year.

In 1996, Asian Trekking became the first trekking company in Nepal to launch a website.

Asian Trekking has organized multiple years of Eco Everest Expeditions, and often provides logistics for many expeditions. Asian Trekking supported the 2001 International Everest Expedition. In 2009, Asian Trekking organized expeditions including the Eco Everest Expedition 2009, Atunas Taiwanese 7 Summit and Everest Expedition 2009, International Adventure Alternative Everest Expedition 2009, 7 Summit Club Everest Expedition 2009, Kazak Lhotse-Everest Expedition 2009, and Indo Bangladesh Mount Makalu Expedition. Asian Trekking has supported expeditions on the North and South sides of Mount Everest, and also to Lhotse. Asian Trekking has also supported International Dream Everest and Eco Everest Expedition trips to Mount Everest.

In the aftermath of the 2015 Mount Everest avalanche, Asian Trekking and Himex helped injured people at their camps.

== Deaths and controversies ==
Asian Trekking received media attention in 2006 when one of their clients, David Sharp, died near the summit. This event was involved in an international climbing ethics controversy.

On May 14, 2006, Sharp encountered trouble at an altitude of approximately 8,500 meters (27,887 feet), where he faced a shortage of supplemental oxygen and adverse weather conditions. Sharp's climb was witnessed by several climbers from different expeditions, who say his distress was evident. Due to the circumstances, the other climbers' priority was directed toward ensuring their own personal safety and continuing their ascent to the summit, making it difficult to assist Sharp.

Sharp was climbing without any support from a guiding team, hiring Asian Trekking for base camp support only. It was his 3rd attempt on Everest and 5th time on an 8000m expedition, having been on Cho Oyu twice before. At the time of his death, David Sharp was found to be in possession of a receipt for US$7,490, believed to be the whole financial cost with Asian Trekking. Comparatively, fully guided expeditions range between US$30,000 and US$100,000. The absence of action by the other climbers triggered debates and controversy regarding the ethical obligations of mountaineers on Everest. Some individuals, such as Edmund Hillary, contended that the climbers ought to have given precedence to saving a life rather than pursuing the summit, while others emphasized the severe challenges inherent in high-altitude climbing. Also, the low-cost support may be part of the problem

== Summiteers/Expeditions ==
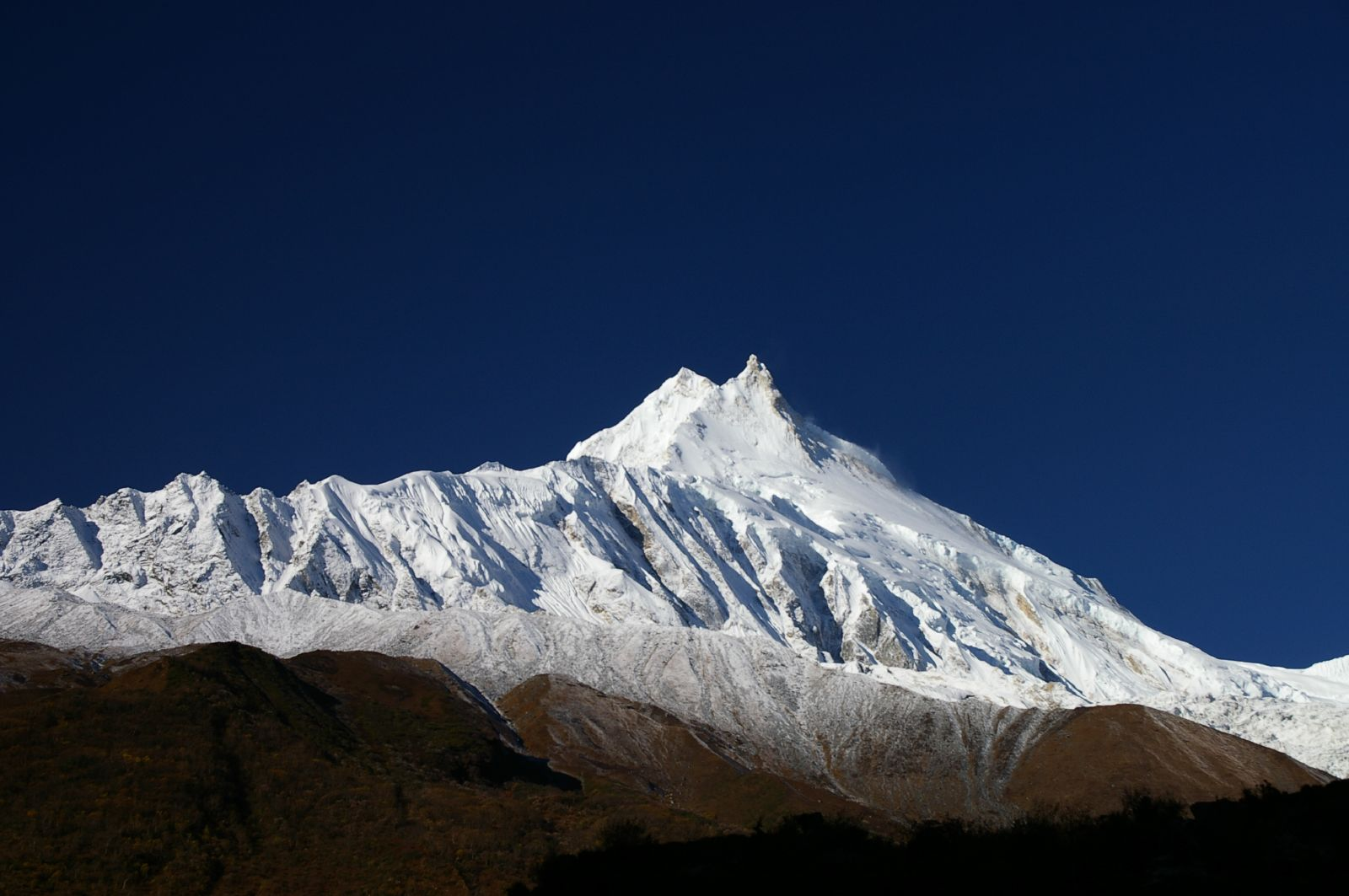
Manaslu, a high mountain in Nepal

- Everest 1984
  - Hristo Prodanov
- Everest 2013
  - Shera Gyalzen Sherpa
  - Pemba Tshering
  - David Liano Gonzalez
  - Samden Bhote
- Shishapangma 2013
  - Zoltan Benedek
  - Batman Lai Ulzii-Orshikh

Jakob Urth attempted summit Lhotse supported by Asian Trekking.

== See also ==
- List of Mount Everest guides
- List of Mount Everest records
- List of Mount Everest expeditions
- Nepal Mountaineering Association
- Adventure Consultants
- Himex
- 1996 Mount Everest disaster
