= Dawa Steven Sherpa =

Nepali Sherpa and environmentalist

Dawa Steven Sherpa (Nepali: दावा स्टेभन शेर्पा) is a Nepalese Sherpa adventurer, entrepreneur and environmentalist, known for his contributions to mountaineering, environmental conservation, and social welfare in Nepal.

== Personal life and career ==
Dawa Steven was born in March 1984 to Ang Tshering Sherpa, a Nepalese Sherpa, and a Belgian mother. Dawa Steven runs Asian Trekking Pvt. Ltd, established by his father in 1982. He graduated from Heriot-Watt University Scotland with an Honours Degree in Business Administration in 2006 and speaks six languages: Dutch, Nepali, English, Hindi, German and Chinese.

Dawa Steven established Astrek Climbing Wall in the center of Kathmandu. Astrek Climbing Wall sponsors and conducts the training of the Nepali national climbing team, who have now represented Nepal in various international competition, including the Climbing World Cup.

Dawa and his late business partner Ted Atkins established TopOut Nepal Pvt. Ltd.

He was the drop zone safety officer and logistics in charge of the world's highest parachute landing at 20,200 ft on 27 October 2019.

He was the lead organiser of the first ice skating and Ice Hockey Event in Nepal. Skate Nepal, as part of the Visit Nepal Year 2020 campaign, at Gokyo Lake (4750m) on 14th Feb. 2020

== Mountaineering ==
Dawa Steven Sherpa has scaled Mount Everest three times, as well as other Himalayan peaks such as Kanchenjunga, Lhotse, Cho Oyu, Manaslu, Mt. Baruntse and Mount Pumori In 2021 Dawa made the first ascent of the Kidia Route on Mt. Kilimanjaro, together with climber Ake Lindstrom and TANAPA park rangers Henry and Daniel. He has also trekked the entire length of the Nepal Himalaya along the Great Himalaya Trail.

== Environmental and social projects ==
Dawa is known for his work of cleaning over 25,000Kgs of garbage from Mt. Everest, as well as other 8000m peaks in Nepal. He has also been a vocal climate change advocate and led many projects to climate change impacts on local communities. His work in the field of environmental protection have been recognised by the International Olympic Committee, World Wildlife Fund (WWF), The Sir Edmund Hillary Foundation of Canada, the International Mountaineering & Climbing Federation (UIAA), and the International Union for Conservation of Nature (IUCN). He started the 'Cash for Trash' cleanup campaign on Everest.

In the aftermath of the devastating earthquake of 2015 in Nepal, Dawa Steven established and led the “Resilient Homes” project, which has built over 700 temporary houses for poor rural families who lost their homes in the disaster. For this work, Dawa was officially recognised for "his extraordinary leadership and immense contribution towards the needy community members" by the National Reconstruction Authority, Government of Nepal.

Dawa Steven was featured in WWF-hosted TEDx talk in 2011.

== Membership ==
- Member, Programme implementation Sub-Committee, Visit Nepal 2020 Campaign, Government of Nepal.
- Executive Member, Himalayan Rescue Association (HRA)
- Secretary, Expedition Operators Association- Nepal (EOAN)
