= Charpane =

Business center in Koshi Province, Nepal

Charpane (चारपाने) is a business center in Birtamod Municipality in Jhapa District in the Province No. 1 of south-eastern Nepal. At the time of the 1991 Nepal census it had a population of 7766 people living in 1472 individual households. Ramchowk is a Chautari popular for local meeting and discussion platform for the people living in this area. There is a small jungle of SAAL from which the jungle is given a name of SAALGHARI. There is a local public school named Mohanmaya School. Bal Kalyan Boarding School is besides (south corner)of Charpane Chowk(चारपाने चोक).

Charpane has become a part of the Birtamod Municipality now which is one of the newly formed 41# Municipalities of Nepal.
