= Bajeko Sekuwa =

Bajeko Sekuwa बाजेको सेकुवा
- Company type: Private Company
- Industry: Restaurants
- Founder: Dinanath Bhandari
- Headquarters: Kathmandu, Nepal
- Key people: Chetan Bhandari (chairman); Nitima Karki Bhandari (Director of Bajeko Masala); Jhonson Shrestha (Sales and Marketing Manager)
- Products: Sekuwa (Barbeque meat), Timmur flavored dishes, Taas, Momo, and indian cuisines
- Number of employees: 300+
- Website: www.bajekosekuwa.com

Bajeko Sekuwa is a Nepali restaurant chain. It was founded by Dinanath Bhandari, opened its first outlet at Sinamangal, Kathmandu. The restaurant serves sekuwas and typical Nepalese cuisine made with a proprietary mix of spices. Bajeko Sekuwa currently has 21 restaurants in operation with five fully owned outlets and rest under franchise model and has expanded its outlets in Nuwakot, Janakpur, Nepalgunj, Biratnagar, Dang and Pokhara.

== History ==
It was established by Dinanath Bhandari in 1976 as a roadside food stall close to the Tribhuvan International Airport. The name came from the founder itself as the customers used to refer to Dinanath Bhandari as Baje which later became the brand name of the restaurant. Bajeko Sekuwa opened its first outlet at Sinamangal, kathmandu followed by other at different locations in the capital.

== Bajeko Masala ==
Bajeko Masala produces and distributes varieties of packaged spices including Barha Masala, Green Masala, Chicken Masala, Meat Masala, Sekuwa Masala, Curry Masala, Chicken Masala, and Garam Masala. Only the head chefs and founder knows all the ingredients. The dish was the foundation of the business that started four decades ago in Nepal.

== Bajeko Group ==
Bajeko Group is a business model to provide franchising of Bajeko Sekuwa restaurant. It provides the ownership and operational rights of Bajeko Sekuwa to the individuals for growth and development.

== Timmure Sekuwa ==
Timmure sekuwa is a sister concern of Bajeko Sekuwa with a concept of Affordable foods and Drinks in MRP. The revolutionary idea was thought and brought into reality of Chairman Chetan bhandari. It opened its first outlet in Kamalbinayak and currently is in 5 different locations till date that includes, Mid baneshwor, Durbarmarg, Mhepi and Hanumansthan. The chairman plans to expand this model all around the country soon.
