= List of industrial estates in Nepal =

This is a list of industrial estates in Nepal.

- Balaju Industrial Estate
- Bhaktapur Industrial Estate
- Birendranagar Industrial Estate
- Butwal Industrial Estate
- Dhankuta Industrial Estate (construction work held up due to technical problem)
- Dharan Industrial Estate
- Hetauda Industrial Estate
- Nepalgunj Industrial Estate
- Patan Industrial Estate
- Pokhara Industrial Estate
- Gajendra Narayan Singh Industrial Estate (Rajbiraj)

== See also ==
- List of cities in Nepal
- List of companies of Nepal
