= Ang Tshering Sherpa (mountaineer) =

Nepali mountaineer

- Born: November 15, 1953 (age 72); Khumjung, Nepal
- Organization: Asian Trekking Pvt. Ltd.

Ang Tshering Sherpa (born 15 November 1953) is a Nepalese mountaineer, who belongs to the Sherpa ethnic group and is president of the Nepal Mountaineering Association and Honorary Consul of Belgium.

Ang Thesring Sherpa grew up in Khumjung, a village in the Everest area between Namche Bazar and Tengboche. He was one of the first graduates of a local school founded by Sir Edmund Hillary.

He started working as a porter in mountain tourism in the early 70s. In 1982 he founded Asian Trekking Pvt. Ltd., one of the largest trekking and expedition agencies in Nepal and Tibet. Sherpa studied MBBS for three years at Darbhanga Medical College.

Sherpa is also the founder of now-defunct Asian Airlines and Skyline Airways.

Since 1990, he has been on the Central Executive Board of the Nepal Mountaineering Association. From 2002 to 2011 he was president for three terms and now serves as the Immediate Past President. In addition, he is President of the Union of Asian Alpine Associations. In these functions he has been strongly committed to environmental protection and warns of the changes and dangers in the Himalayas caused by climate change.

In 2012, Sherpa was added to the list of Honorary Members of the Union Internationale des Associations d'Alpinisme.

He is married to a Belgian who heads the Belgian Consulate in Kathmandu. Ang Tshering Sherpa was appointed Honorary Consul of Belgium. He is general representative of the mountain association of China and Tibet.

== Awards and honors ==
- Knight of the Order of Leopold II
- Member Third Class of the Order of Gorkha Dakshina Bahu
