= Ted Atkins =

English explorer

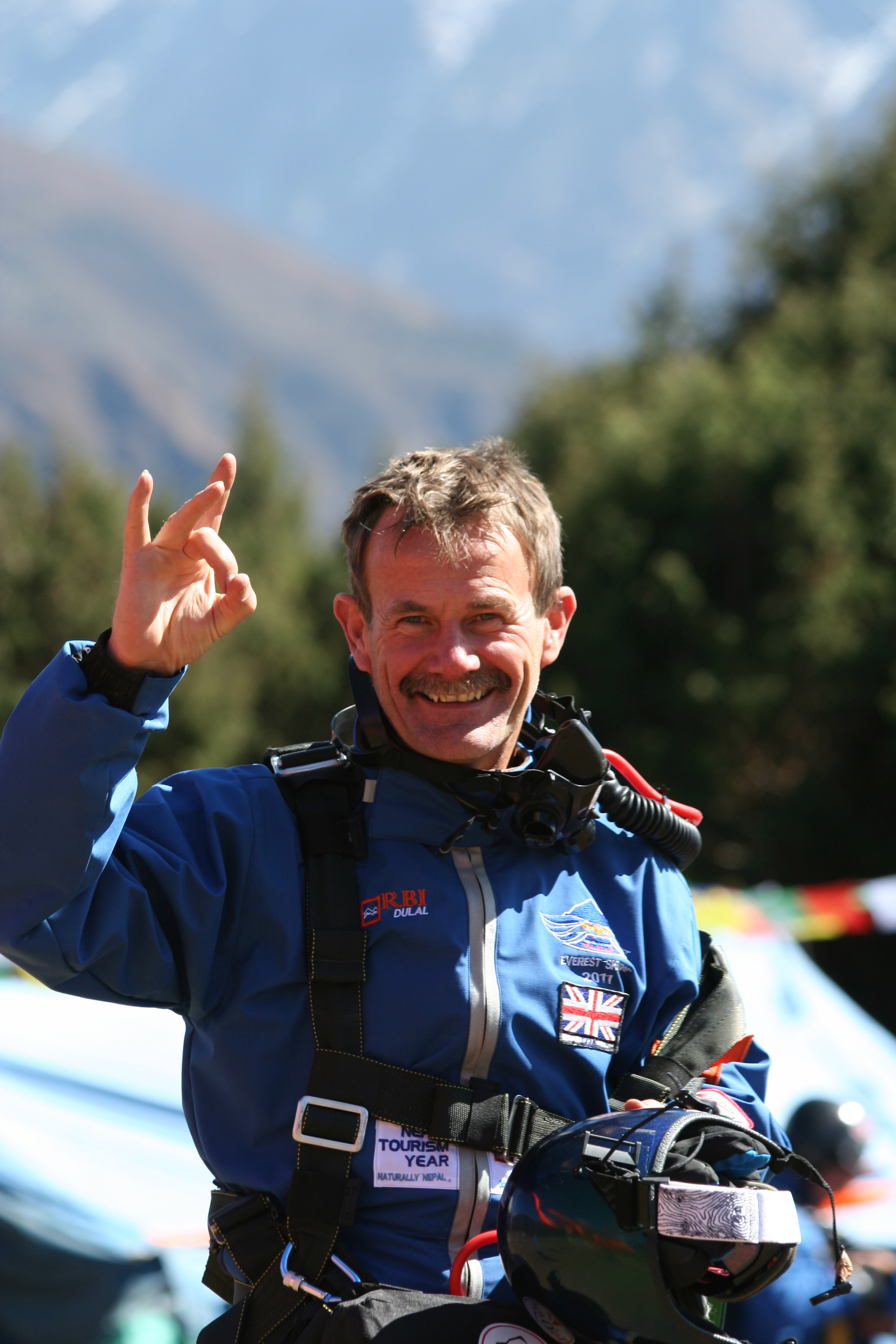
Ted Atkins in 2011

Ian Edward "Ted" Atkins (8 November 1958 – 20 August 2018) was an English explorer, engineer, mountaineer and inventor.

== Early life ==
Atkins was brought up in Cotgrave, Nottinghamshire, the son of a miner.

== Career ==
Atkins became Staff Officer for the Royal Air Force Mountain Rescue Service in charge of teams in Scotland. In this position he took the first RAF team to climb Mt. Everest in 2001.

For his Antarctic work, he was invested with the Polar Medal by the Queen.

== Climbing experience ==
In 1979, Atkins volunteered for the Royal Air Force Mountain Rescue Service. From rock and winter climbing, Atkins went to the Alps and onto the Himalayas, first in 1983 to Manaslu then in 1988 onto the West Ridge of Everest, where he became involved with oxygen systems. The unsuccessful expedition was a forerunner of the RAF Everest Expedition in 2001, during which he and his partner, Dr. Brian Kirkpatrick, failed to summit with the RAF Everest team as a result of rescuing a civilian climber. Atkins went back to Everest, this time to the south in Nepal in 2004 to climb the mountain on his own. Observing the need for a good oxygen delivery system, he used his engineering experience to devise a solution, and later set up his own companies called Topout Oxygeneering and Topout Aero, in partnership with Dr. Ryan Jackson, to manufacture the "Multi-purpose Tactical Oxygen System (MTOS)".

== Post RAF ==
Atkins began selling bottled oxygen for climbers through a company called Topout Oxygeneering, and was later credited by the Nepalese Mountaineering Association with reducing the death rate from 1:10 to less than 1:700. The demand was such that Atkins left the RAF to concentrate on his new business. He went on to produce a new cylinder, cylinder valve, regulator and flow controller. Eventually, he built a plant to produce oxygen in Nepal in order to guarantee the quality of the gas.

He also collaborated with the Everest Skydive Team to develop a better oxygen system for jumps exiting the aircraft at a similar altitude to the summit of Everest. The Topout Aero skydive system went on to become the industry standard. At the same time he went to the Ama Dablam Base Camp to make an attempt at a world record skydive, in tandem with Tom Noonan, landing at 15,000 feet above sea level.

In 2015, Atkins was advisor to chef Sat Bains when the latter launched an attempt to raise £100,000 for Community Action Nepal by hosting a dinner party 23,000 feet above sea level. Bains had to be brought down the mountain by Atkins and hospitalised. Atkins himself also set a record for the highest-ever boat ride, by paddling a collapsible boat across a glacial lake at 6,300 metres on the slopes of Everest.

Atkins was a Science and Engineering Ambassador for young people into science and engineering, and delivered talks in many countries, including Italy where he lived. In Nepal he was involved with several charity organizations and was a trustee of an orphanage. He wrote a column in the Nepali Times about the mountaineering experience in Nepal, with the aim of making things better. His last column was published on 18 May 2018, and recorded his concerns about the quality of oxygen equipment being sold to climbers.

== Death ==
At the time of his death, Atkins was living in the Dolomites with his wife Shona and son, Lewis. and began calling himself "Teddy" because local people could not pronounce the name "Ted". He was killed descending Monte Civetta, one of the highest mountains in the range, in the province of Belluno (Italy), on 20 August 2018.
