= Eco Everest Expedition =

Annual debris-clearing expedition on Mount Everest

Eco Everest Expedition is an annual expedition drill, started by Asian Trekking Pvt. Ltd. in 2008, with the sole aim of clearing and removing accumulated debris on Mount Everest.

== Background ==
Mount Everest, the highest mountain on earth, has attracted thousands of mountaineers in the last two centuries and was first successfully climbed in 1953 by Edmund Hillary and Tenzing Norgay. Hundreds of expeditions left garbage and mountaineering equipment by the ascent lines. Some items at high altitude remained there for decades and gradually piled up. Garbage became a threat to the environment and future expeditions.

== Cleaning the debris ==
As of 2021, more than 25,000 kilograms (55,000 lb) of debris and waste materials and more than 1000 kilograms of human waste (and the remains of five dead climbers) left on the mountain had been brought down by Eco Everest Expedition.

=== 2008 expedition ===
Asian Trekking - Eco Everest Expedition began removing debris in 2008. Partnering with the International Centre for Integrated Mountain Development and United Nations Environment Programme and support by Nepal, the expedition created awareness about global warming and importance of sustainable mountaineering. Dawa Stevan Sherpa, son of well known mountaineer Ang Thsering Sherpa led the first expedition and reached the summit on 26 May 2008.

== See also ==
- List of Mount Everest expeditions
