= IMS Group =

Nepalese conglomerate

- Type: Private Company
- Industry: Consumer electronics, motors, jewelry, consulting and real estate
- Founded: 1993
- Founder: Deepak Malhotra
- Area served: Nepal
- Key people: Dikesh Malhotra (CEO, president)
- Website: imsgroup.com.np

IMS Group is a conglomerate company based in Nepal. It primarily deals with distributing international mobile handsets throughout the nation. It was appointed the official distributor of Samsung mobile handsets in Nepal in 2001. The company has also acquired a dealership of the international automobile company Ssangyong for Nepal, and has also expanded its services towards real estate, automobiles, jewelry and consulting.

== Overview ==
IMS Group was established in 1993 by entrepreneur Deepak Malhotra. He rose from petty trades to entrepreneurship in the late 1970s. It has been the official distributor of Samsung mobile phones in Nepal since 2001. The network spans over 37 regional distributors and 1,300 retail outlets across 72 districts of Nepal.

== Ventures ==
The group also has operations in other sectors, ranging from real estate, business consulting, consumer goods, and automobiles to telecommunications. IMS Group has over 20 companies under its banner. This includes these services it provides through IMS, IMS SMart, IMS Connect, IMS Care, IMS Telecom, Cellcom, DJI Drones, IMS Motors, Rasuwa KD Joint Venture, Silver Valley Developers, Grande International Hospital, Synergy Corporation, The Leaf Resort, Hotel Shahenshah, Le Temor Spa & Resort, Times Energy, Shree Mount Rasuwa Upper Mailung Hydro Power, Kathmandu World School, Crane, Dr. Brown's, Himalaya Baby Care, BB Luv, IMS Little Smiles, SpaceTime Network, IMS Cement, IMS Consultancy, Civil Bank, Nepal Infrastructure Bank, Citizens Life Insurance, Reliance Insurance, IMS Agro & DM Foundation.
