= Deurali-Janta Pharmaceuticals =

Nepalese pharmaceutical company

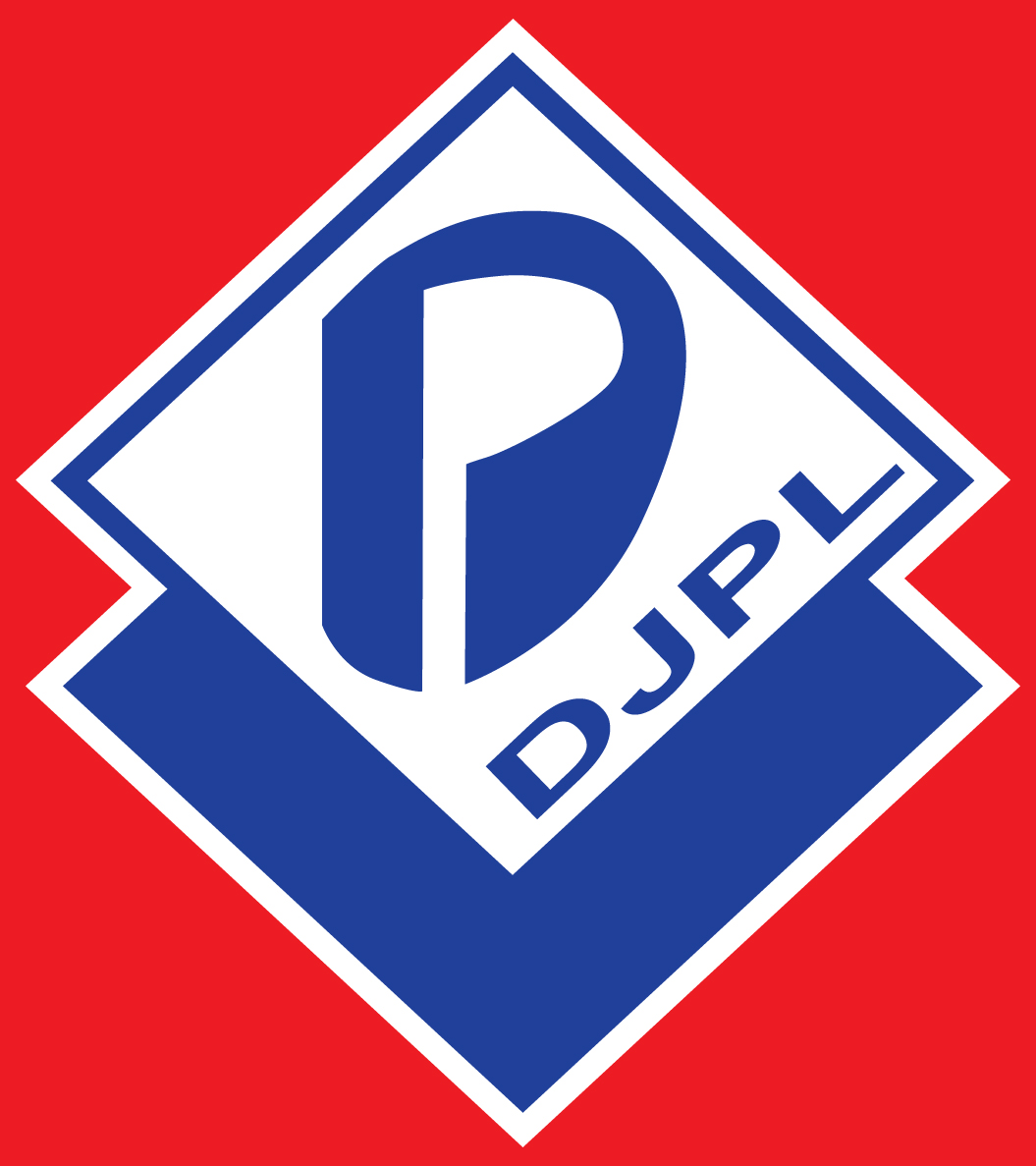

Deurali-Janta Pharmaceuticals Private Limited (DJPL) is a Nepalese pharmaceutical company, based in Kathmandu.

== History ==
Deurali-Janta Pharmaceuticals was established in Kathmandu by Mr. Hari Bhakta Sharma, executive director of the company, in 1988. Its corporate office is based in 679, Budhanilakantha Sadak, Bansbari-3, Kathmandu-44600, Nepal. DJPL started with a few over-the-counter products and antibiotics for minor ailments. In 2005, a specialized division, Suswasthya, was launched that focuses on cardiology and diabetology. In 2011, Aarogyam, a specialised division for dermatology products, followed. The Nirog Division was launched in June 2013 with an investment of Rs 870. Deurali-Janta Pharmaceuticals is now one of the largest companies in Nepal. The company plans to export its products to at least five international markets within the next 10 years. Deurali-Janta Pharmaceuticals was awarded best pharmaceutical company by Swasthya Khabar Patrika Health Award – 2012.

DJPL is the first Nepalese pharmaceutical company awarded with World Health Organization - Good Manufacturing Practice (WHO-GMP) certificate.
