= Skyline Airways =

Nepalese airline (1998–2006)

IATA	ICAO	Call sign
SK (Note: Skyline Airways did not have no registered IATA airline code allocated, but used "SK" on scheduling, ticketing and baggage (as an official IATA code would be used). However, officially, the IATA Code SK is allocated to Scandinavian Airlines.)	-	-
- Founded: 1998
- Commenced operations: 15 July 1999
- Ceased operations: 2006
- AOC #: 032/01
- Operating bases: Tribhuvan International Airport
- Fleet size: 2 (at closure)
- Destinations: 8 (at closure)
- Headquarters: Tinkune, Kathmandu, Nepal
- Key people: Ang Tshering Sherpa (chairman)

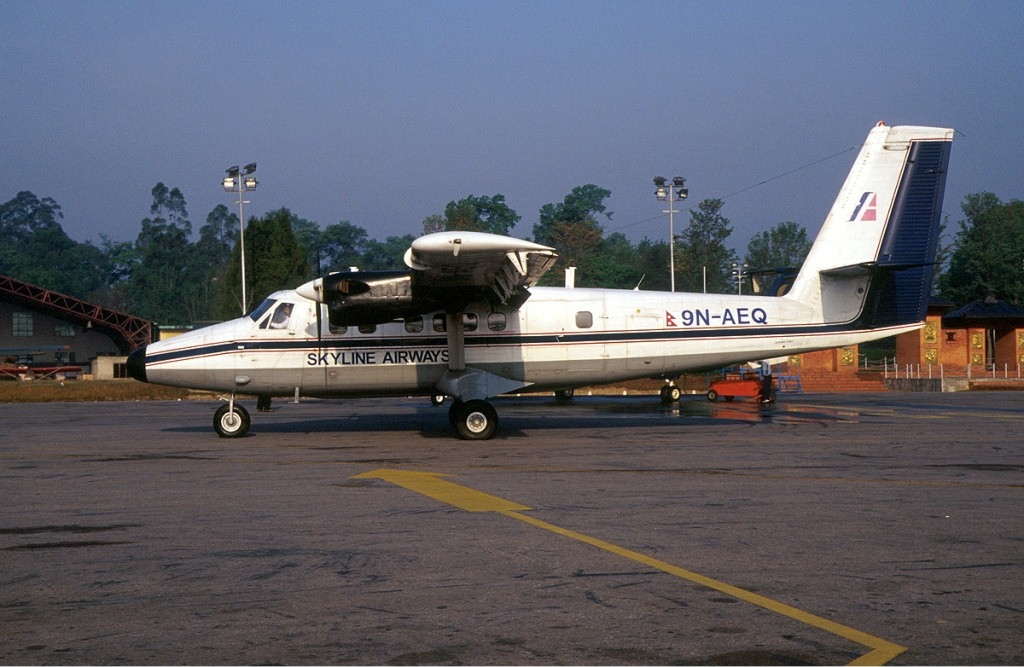
Skyline Airways de Havilland Canada DHC-6 Twin Otter at Tribhuvan International Airport (April 2001).

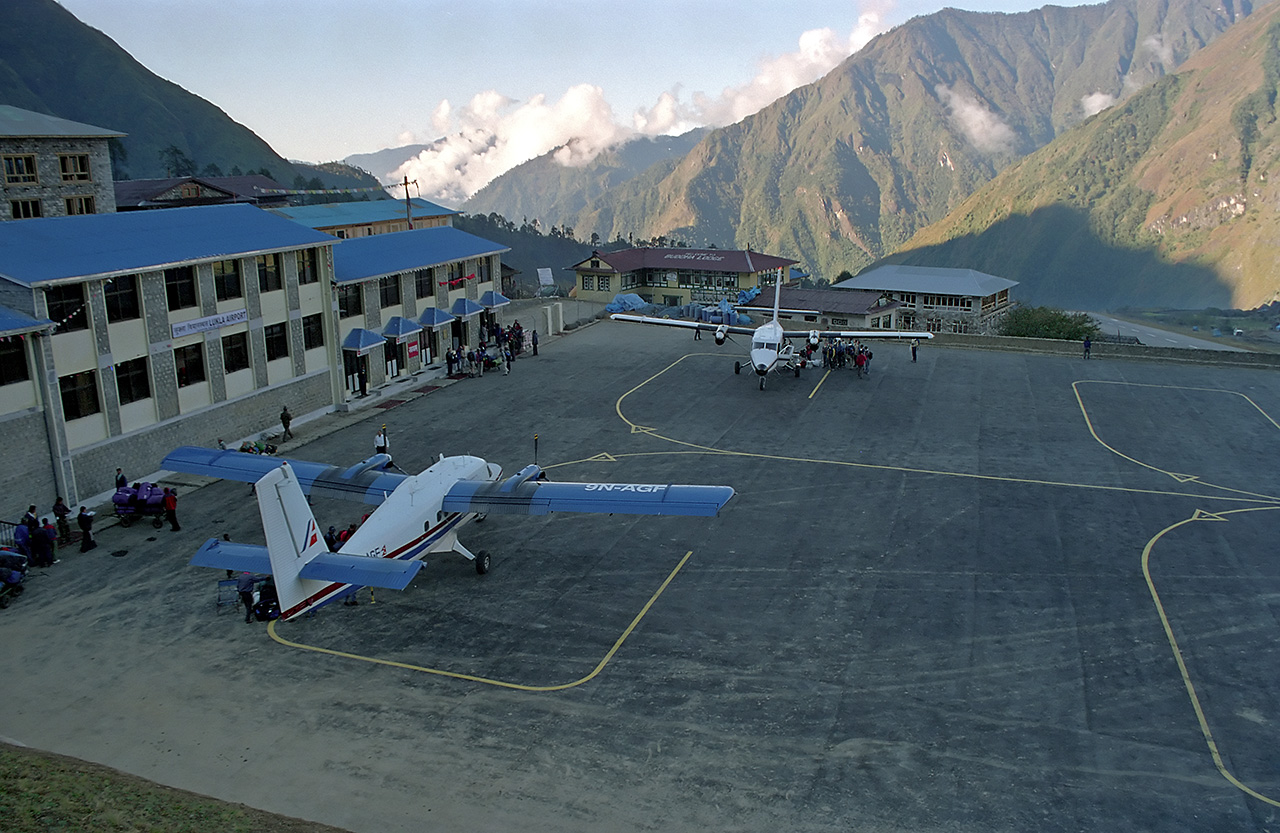
Skyline Airways de Havilland Canada DHC-6 Twin Otter parked at Lukla Airport

Skyline Airways Pvt. Ltd. was an airline based in Kathmandu, Nepal. It was operational between 1999 and 2006 and provided scheduled services to rural destinations in Nepal, as well as charter flights.

== History ==
Skyline Airways launched revenue operations on 15 July 1999, with a fleet of two de Havilland Canada DHC-6 Twin Otter.

== Destinations ==
Skyline Airways regularly served the following destinations, which were cancelled either at the closure of operations or before:

City	Airport	Notes	Refs
Bhairahawa	Bhairahawa Airport	Terminated	
Bharatpur	Bharatpur Airport		
Jomsom	Jomsom Airport		
Kathmandu	Tribhuvan International Airport	Hub	
Lamidanda	Lamidanda Airport	Terminated	
Lukla	Tenzing–Hillary Airport		
Phaplu	Phaplu Airport		
Pokhara	Pokhara Airport		
Rumjatar	Rumjatar Airport		
Pipara Simara	Simara Airport		
Surkhet	Surkhet Airport	Terminated	
Tumlingtar	Tumlingtar Airport	Terminated	

== Fleet ==
At the time of closure, Skyline Airways operated the following aircraft:

Skyline Airways fleet
Aircraft	In fleet	Notes
De Havilland Canada DHC-6 Twin Otter	2	

== Accidents and incidents ==
- 25 December 1999 - A Skyline Airways De Havilland Canada DHC-6 Twin Otter 300 (9N-AFL) crashed 5 minutes after takeoff from Simara Airport on a flight to Kathmandu. All three crew and seven passengers were killed.
- 17 July 2002 - A Skyline Airways De Havilland Canada DHC-6 Twin Otter 300 (9N-AGF) left Jumla on a flight to Surkhet. The aircraft reached an altitude of about 6500 feet around 18 minutes after take-off and before crashing into trees on the Gargare Danda hill in bad weather, 10 km (6.2 mi) north of Surkhet. All four people on board were killed, including two crew and two passengers.
