= Asian Airlines =

Helicopter airline in Kathmandu, Nepal

IATA	ICAO	Call sign
—	—	—
- Founded: November 1993
- AOC #: 004/96
- Hubs: Tribhuvan International Airport
- Headquarters: Thamel, Kathmandu, Nepal

Asian Airlines (also known as Asian Airlines Helicopter) was a helicopter airline based at Tribhuvan International Airport in Kathmandu, Nepal founded by Ang Tshering Sherpa in 1993. It claims to be the first helicopter airline of Nepal. It ceased operations in 2006.

== History ==
Asian Airlines was founded after the deregulation of the Nepalese aviation sector. According to Tashi Sherpa, managing director of Asian Airlines, the airline wanted to start fixed-wing operations but the Ministry of Culture, Tourism and Civil Aviation urged the airlines to operate helicopters. The first flight of the airline was delayed, as the delivery of its first two helicopters was stuck at Jinnah International Airport for over a month, as Nepalese authorities were hesitant on allowing Russian-built aircraft in Nepal.

== Fleet ==
The airline operated a fleet of MI-17 helicopters.

== Accidents and incidents ==
- On 20 February 2002, during the Nepalese Civil War, members of the People's Liberation Army, Nepal destroyed a MI-17 belonging to Asian Airlines in Surkhet.
