= Base Air =

Airline

Base Air was an airline based in Nepal.

== History ==
The Civil Aviation Authority of Nepal granted Base Air an air operators licence to fly to all sectors in the country in 2004. Base Air planned to start operations using British Aerospace ATP's in September 2004. Despite this, by 2007 the airline had failed to start operations.
