= NIDC Development Bank =

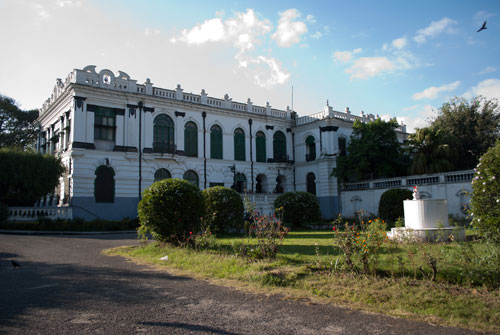
NIDC Main Building

NIDC Development Bank Ltd. (NIDC) was established in July 1959 as the Nepal Industrial Development Corporation. It serves as an industrial finance organization. NIDC has worked to expand Nepalese industries and services, including hotels, industrial districts, and the Nepal Stock Exchange.

NIDC was registered under the Company Act and operated as a national level development bank, providing services to regular customers as well, under the Bank and Financial Institutions Act.

NIDC and Rastriya Banijya Bank completed their merger and started joint operations from May 2, 2018 under the name of Rastriya Banijya Bank.
