= Sekuwa =

Traditional Nepali grilled-meat dish

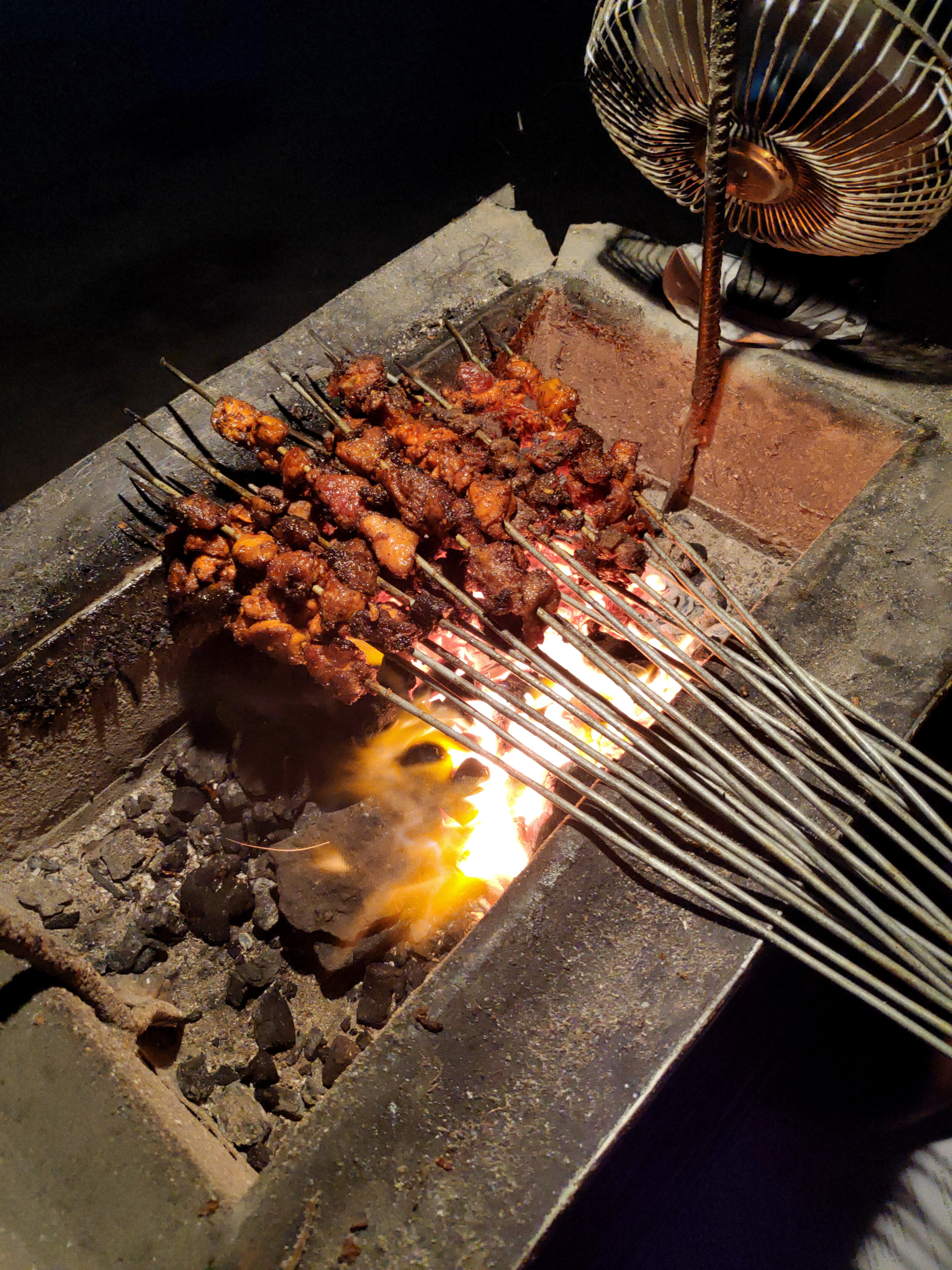
- Sekuwa
- Alternative names: "sikeko maasu" (सिकेको मासु)
- Type: Kebab
- Course: Appetizer/Snack
- Place of origin: Nepal
- Created by: Unknown
- Serving temperature: 65 - 70°C / 150 - 160° F
- Variations: Region to region
- Food energy (per serving): May vary

Sekuwa is a traditional Nepalese dish consisting of meat that is marinated with a blend of spices, ginger-garlic paste, yogurt, lemon juice, mustard oil, and salt, then skewed and grilled over an open flame or charcoal, producing a smoky, rich flavor. The dish is an essential part of Nepalese cuisine and is typically made with meats such as goat, chicken, buffalo, or lamb, though variations may include pork or a mixture of meats.

Sekuwa is widely popular across Nepal, particularly in cities such as Kathmandu, Dharan, and Tarahara, and is considered a specialty in the Sunsari District of Koshi State in Eastern Nepal, where it is often served during festivals, celebrations, or social gatherings. In these areas, sekuwa is a common dish eaten with chiura (beaten rice), achar (spicy pickle), and a side salad of sliced onions, tomatoes, and cucumbers. It is also commonly paired with alcoholic beverages, especially raksi or wine.

Although it is most commonly served as an appetizer or a main course, it is also consumed as a snack. The popularity of sekuwa has led to its inclusion in various local eateries, roadside stalls, and restaurants throughout Nepal, and it has become an iconic representation of Nepali cuisine.

The calorie content of sekuwa varies depending on the type of meat used, the marinating process, and the portion size, but a typical 100-gram serving may contain approximately 200-250 calories.
