= Giribandhu Tea Estate =

Giri Bandhu Tea Estate is a large tea company based in Jhapa, Nepal. It was founded in the early 1960s by late Shamsher Giri, Tek bahadhur Giri, Padam Bahadur Giri, and Bhagawan Giri, and is one of the biggest players in the Nepalese tea industry. It is the largest tea manufacturer in Nepal. It operates and runs two tea estates and a large and highly modernized processing plant.

== History ==
The tea estate was founded in 1950s by Shamsher Giri, Tek Bahadur Giri, Padam Bahadur Giri, and Bhagawan Giri, and has been a family-run business since then. The estate started off small, producing a small quantity of processed tea, but has become one of the most prominent tea estates in Nepal.

== Location ==
The estate is located on either side of the Mahendra Highway, to the east of Birtamod, a developing city. The estate is visible from the road, and is often a stopping point for people passing by the area wanting to take photographs. The majority of the estate's property is not visible from the highway as it spreads out multiple kilometers on either side of the road. The estate also has its own factory located just off the road surrounded by the estate itself, for the processing of the green leaves.
