= Birtamod Municipality =

Municipality in Koshi Province, Nepal

Birtamod बिर्तामोड
- Municipality (नगरपालिका)
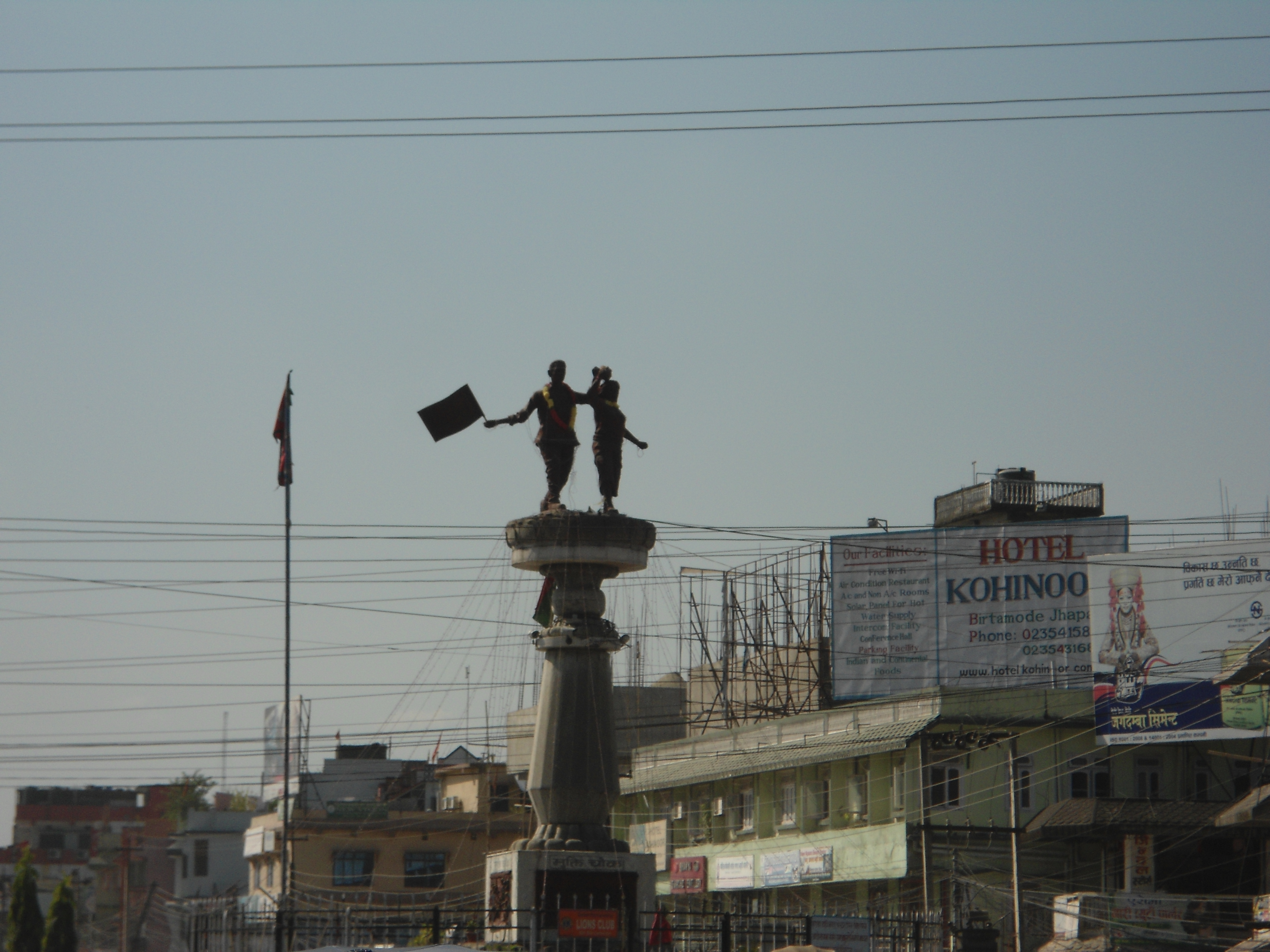
- Mukti Chowk, Birtamod

- Location within Koshi Province Location within Nepal
- Coordinates: 26°38′N 87°59′E
- Country: Nepal
- Province: Koshi
- District: Jhapa

Government
  - Mayor: Pabitra Devi Mahatara (CPN-UML)
  - Deputy Mayor: Nagendra Prasad Sangroula (CPN-UML)

Area
  - Total: 78.24 km^{2} (30.21 sq mi)
- Elevation: 300 m (980 ft)

Population (2019)
  - Total: 146,795
  - Density: 1,876/km^{2} (4,859/sq mi)
- Time zone: UTC+05:45 (NST)
- Postal code: 57204
- Area code: 023
- Website: www.birtamodmun.gov.np

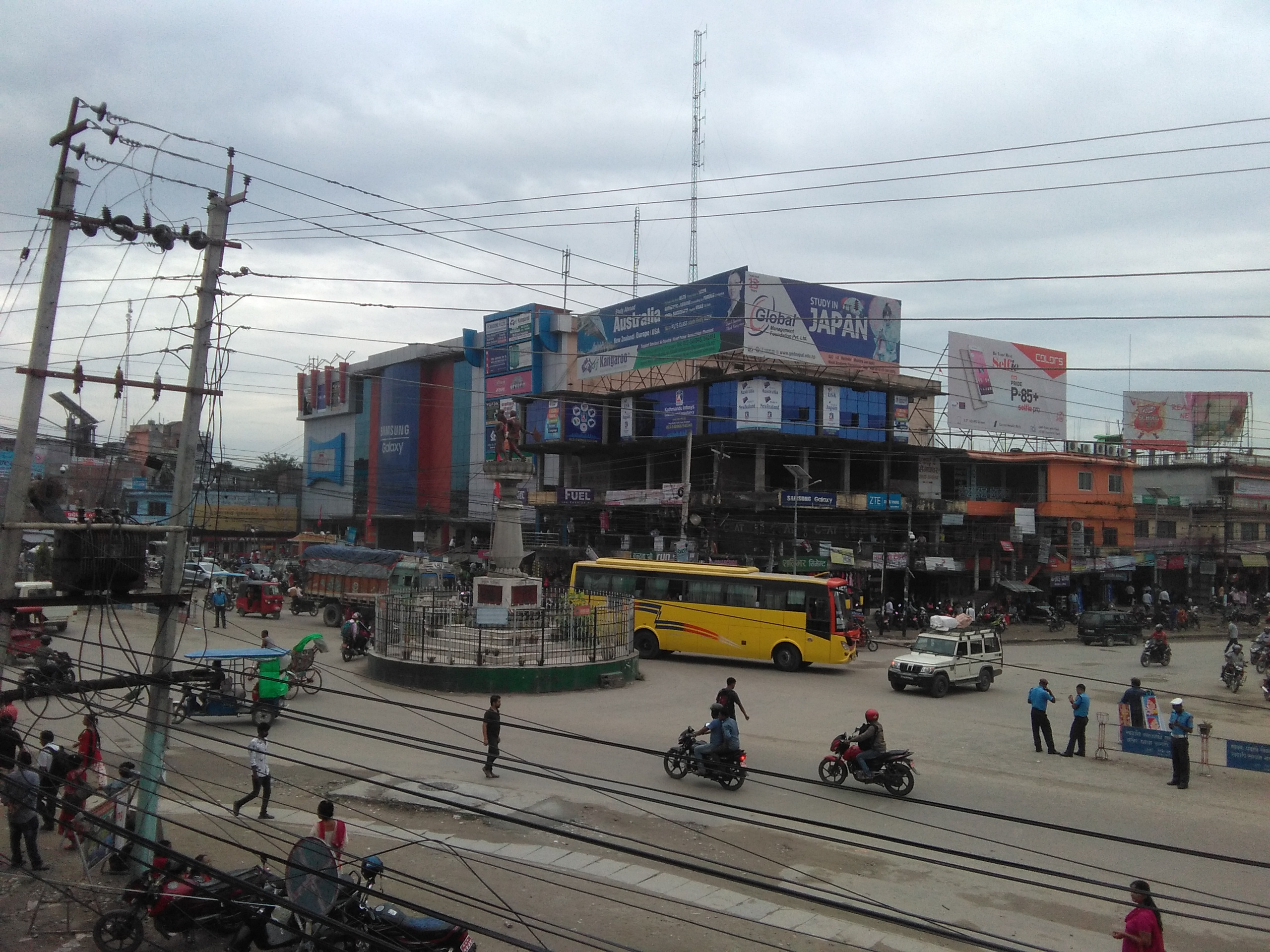
A view of Mukti Chowk in Birtamod, Jhapa

Birtamod (Nepali: बिर्तामोड नगरपालिका) is a municipality in Jhapa District of Nepal. It is the commercial, educational and transportation hub of Jhapa District. Sarnamati Bazar, Dhulabari Bazar, Dhaijan Bazar, Charali Bazar, Shivasatakshi Bazar, Kamatoli Bazar, Chakchaki Bazar and Surunga Bazar are some of the nearest local towns and settlements connected to Birtamod. It is one of the fastest-growing cities in Nepal and one of the largest cities in Jhapa.

== History ==
The town was under the Anarmani Village Development Committee and was transformed into a municipality in May 2014. It merged with Charpane VDC and then merged with Garamani VDC in 2017.

Birtamod was originally part of a great forest. Due to the presence of mosquitoes and the threat of malaria, very few people lived there. Later, the forests were cleared off for cultivating the fertile lands. Slowly, people of the hills started to migrate to Birtamod. These people were accompanied by the Nepalese who returned home from the Indian territories of Assam and West Bengal. The ethnic communities, Rajbanshi, Dhimal, etc. are the indigenous people of Birtamod and Jhapa as a whole. Birtamod started to rise when the East West Highway passed through it. Being at the physical center of the district, it started to rise as a center for commercial activities. Birtamod gained greater prominence during the Maoist insurgency when trade and banking of the whole Jhapa district became concentrated in Birtamod.

== Transportation ==
Birtamod is connected to all parts of the country by the central Mahendra Highway which runs across the length of the country from east to west. Chandragadhi (Bhadrapur) Airport is located in Bhadrapur (about 12 km from Birtamod) and serves 5 to 6 daily flights to and from Kathmandu. Buddha Air, Yeti Airlines, Shree Airlines and Saurya Airlines are some of the airlines that have daily flights to and from Kathmandu, the capital of Nepal. There are various means of transportation in Birtamod but the major means of transportation is via local bus.

=== Major cities nearby ===
- Mechinagar
- Surunga
- Bhadrapur
- Arjundhara
- Charali
- Damak

== Demography ==
Religion in Birtamod (2011)
Religion	Percent
Hinduism	83%
Kiratism	6%
Buddhism	4%
Islam	4%
Others	3%

=== Caste And Ethnic groups ===
Caste and Ethnic groups in Birtamod
1. Hill Brahman (28.0%)
2. Chhetri (13.0%)
3. Rajbanshi (10.0%)
4. Limbu (6.50%)
5. Rai (3.90%)
6. muslim (4.00%)
7. others (35.0%)

=== Languages ===
language in Birtamod
1. Nepali (58.0%)
2. Rajbansi (10.0%)
3. Maithili (6.00%)
4. Limbu (4.00%)
5. Others (22.0%)

== Climate ==
The climate of Birtamod is hot and humid during summer, and mild and dry during winter. During the summer, temperatures can reach 38 degree Celsius, and the low in winter is about 2 degrees Celsius. Rainfall is abundant during the monsoon season (June–September). There is little or no rainfall during winter, which makes it ideal for harvesting crops such as rice, wheat and mustard.

Climate data for Birtamod (Gaida), elevation 107 m (351 ft), (1991–2020 normals)
Month	Jan	Feb	Mar	Apr	May	Jun	Jul	Aug	Sep	Oct	Nov	Dec	Year
Mean daily maximum °C (°F)	23.7 (74.7)	27.0 (80.6)	31.5 (88.7)	33.4 (92.1)	33.3 (91.9)	33.3 (91.9)	33.0 (91.4)	33.5 (92.3)	33.2 (91.8)	32.5 (90.5)	30.1 (86.2)	26.3 (79.3)	30.9 (87.6)
Daily mean °C (°F)	16.0 (60.8)	18.9 (66.0)	23.6 (74.5)	26.4 (79.5)	27.6 (81.7)	28.3 (82.9)	27.1 (80.8)	29.0 (84.2)	28.3 (82.9)	26.2 (79.2)	22.4 (72.3)	18.3 (64.9)	24.3 (75.8)
Mean daily minimum °C (°F)	8.2 (46.8)	10.7 (51.3)	15.7 (60.3)	19.3 (66.7)	21.8 (71.2)	23.3 (73.9)	24.1 (75.4)	24.4 (75.9)	23.4 (74.1)	19.9 (67.8)	14.7 (58.5)	10.2 (50.4)	18.0 (64.4)
Average precipitation mm (inches)	12.2 (0.48)	14.9 (0.59)	23.6 (0.93)	65.5 (2.58)	211.9 (8.34)	448.5 (17.66)	757.8 (29.83)	592.3 (23.32)	431.5 (16.99)	149.6 (5.89)	16.0 (0.63)	9.3 (0.37)	2,733 (107.60)
Source 1: Department of Hydrology and Meteorology
Source 2: JICA (precipitation)

== Industry and agriculture ==
Because of the fertile soil, the land around Birtamod is well suited for agriculture. Rice, wheat, mustard and tea are some of the crops that are grown seasonally. Rice and Wheat is cultivated during the monsoon season when there is abundant rainfall, and harvested during the dry winter months. Several large tea estates and processing factories are located just east of Birtamod. Giri Bandhu Tea Estate (गिरी बन्धु चिया बगान), New Giri Bandhu and Sons Tea Estate, and Buttabari Tea Processing are the major ones. Apart from agriculture the industrial trends are growing. Various cement factories are present to fulfill local requirement of cements at small scale production capacity.

The revolution of information technology in Nepal has effects in Birtamod. The establishment of an IT industry in Birtamod take more effective in Human Resource in Birtamod for outsourcing business.

== Business ==
Birtamod got its business identity as trading hub with the passage of Mahendra Highway and Mechi Highway. Production of hills started being collected and distributed from Birtamod. In the similar fashion, imported products started being sent to hills via Birtamod. Shorty, after being a trading hub, manufacturing activities started at about Birtamod. Alongside, started the rise of service sectors. One can get almost everything at retail and wholesale market of Birtamod that is imported into Nepal. Major products manufactured about Birtamod are: Steel, Cement, Ply, Concrete blocks, Plastic Pipes, Tea, Bricks, alike. Major services available at Birtamod are: School and College Education, Accounting, Business Consultation, Audit, Banking, Transportation, etc.

Television channel Buryodaya TV (सुर्योदय) is based in Birtamod. It was established in 2016. It broadcasts Local Programs, News and Music. It also broadcasts a Talk Show.

== Culture ==
The culture of Birtamod is a mix of cultures of various ethnicities, but these two festival seasons are the most important, partly because of 68% of Nepal's population being Hindu and 18% of the population being Buddhist.

- Lhosar:(ल्होसार) This festival is celebrated three times once a year. The various combination of Buddhism community such as major community of Tamang celebrate Sonam Lhosar in Marga, Sherpa Community celebrate Gyalpo Lhosar in Falgun as well as Gurung Community celebrate Tamu Lhosar in Poush.
- Udhauli Ubhauli
- Dashain: (दशै) Dashain is celebrated by the Hindu's and is an exciting time for families to get together and meet relatives and each other. This festival lasts for 15 days. Celebrations and shopping are common during this time and so are religious ceremonies.
- Tihar and Dipawali: (तिहार) Tihar lasts five days, including a day called Laksmi Puja which coincides with Dipawali. Dipawali is a Hindu festival of lights and colors. People light up their house with little lamps called diya, generally fueled with mustard oil, and burst firecrackers all night long during the five days of Tihar.

== Education ==
According to the latest publicly available report of the Center for Education and Human Resource Development (CEHRD), Birtamod has 93 schools. Of these, 68 are private and 23 are public. The breakdown includes 67 pre-schools, 77 basic schools, and 45 secondary schools. Among the secondary schools, 18 offer +2 programs.

Some of the schools within the municipal area include Balmiki Education Foundation, Mahendra Ratna Secondary School, Newton's Education Academy Secondary School, Kanchanjunga English Secondary School, Mohan Maya Secondary School, Devi Secondary School, Nidi Secondary School, Little Flowers' English School, Bells Model School, St. Xavier'S School, Deonia, Birat Jyoti English Boarding Secondary School, Amity Secondary School, Durga Secondary School Jhapa, Manakamana Secondary School, Ascent Academy, Shree Bir Amarsing Secondary School, Takshashila Progressive English School, Commoners' Home for Education Secondary School, Sahara Saccos Shikshya Sadan, Children Environment English Boarding School, Eden Garden Education Foundation, Abacus Boarding School Birtamod, Saraswati Angels' English School, and Kankai Boarding English Secondary School.

== Incidents ==
- March 22, 2006: Nine policemen and three Maoist rebels were killed during a clash at Birtamod police station and traffic office. A group of Maoists, loaded in three trucks attacked the office at around 7:00 am. In the attack, 20 policemen and two civilians were injured. The injured civilians were under detention and were being held in police custody when the attack took place. Most of the injured policemen were airlifted to Kathmandu for immediate medical treatment because the local hospitals where not able to handle severe trauma victims. Several Maoist rebels were also killed and injured when the truck carrying the rebels overturned during retreat.
- October 27, 2017: Locals started a rebellion against the government for not investigating a child's unknown death a week prior. The police were forced to control the rebellion using weapons and gas. Three of the rebels were killed on the spot and six others including some policeman were fatally injured. The injured were treated in a local hospital. Locals in rage struck the whole eastern part of Nepal for three days. The debate was settled by a discussion between government officials and the victims.

== Images ==
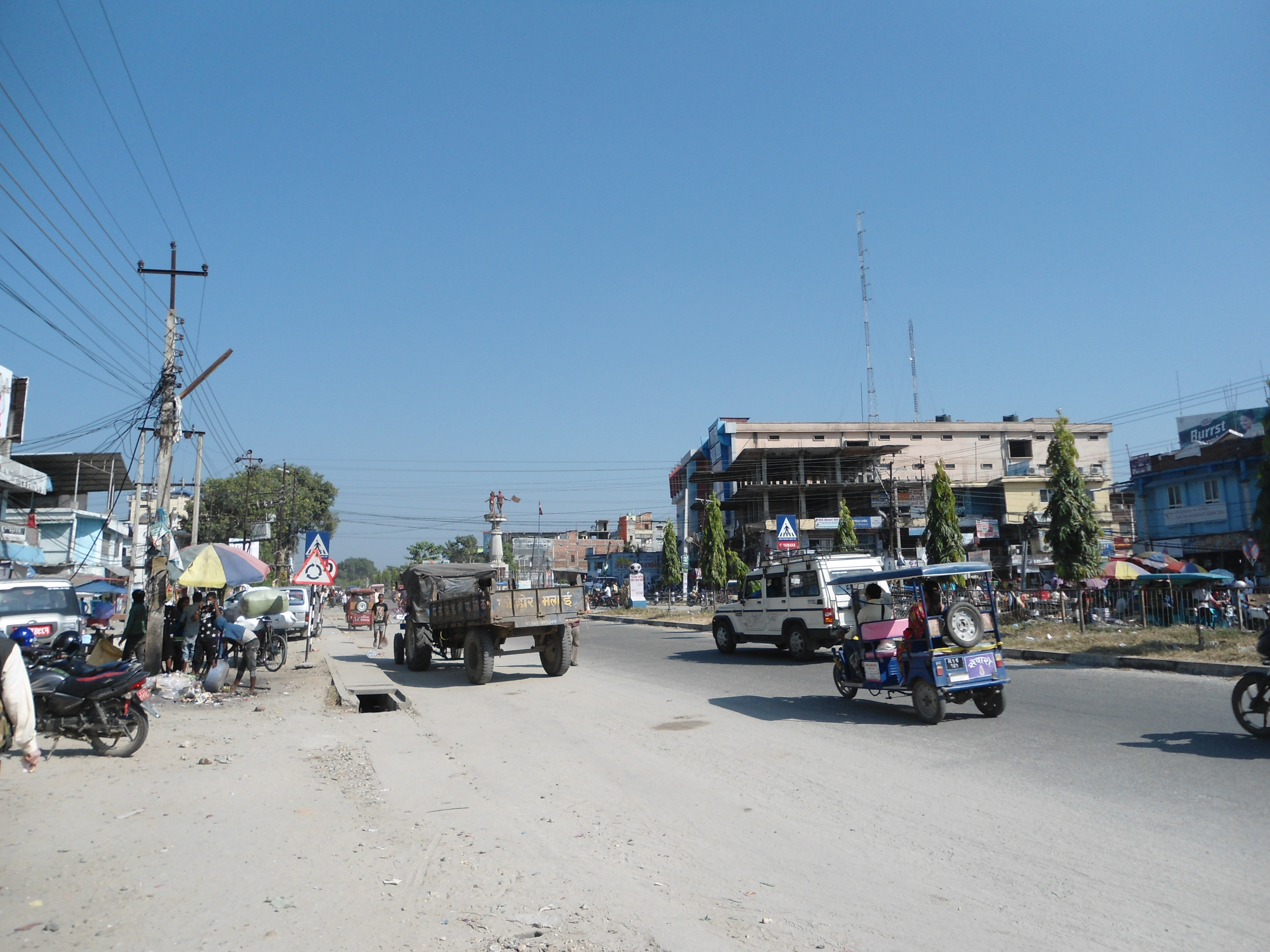

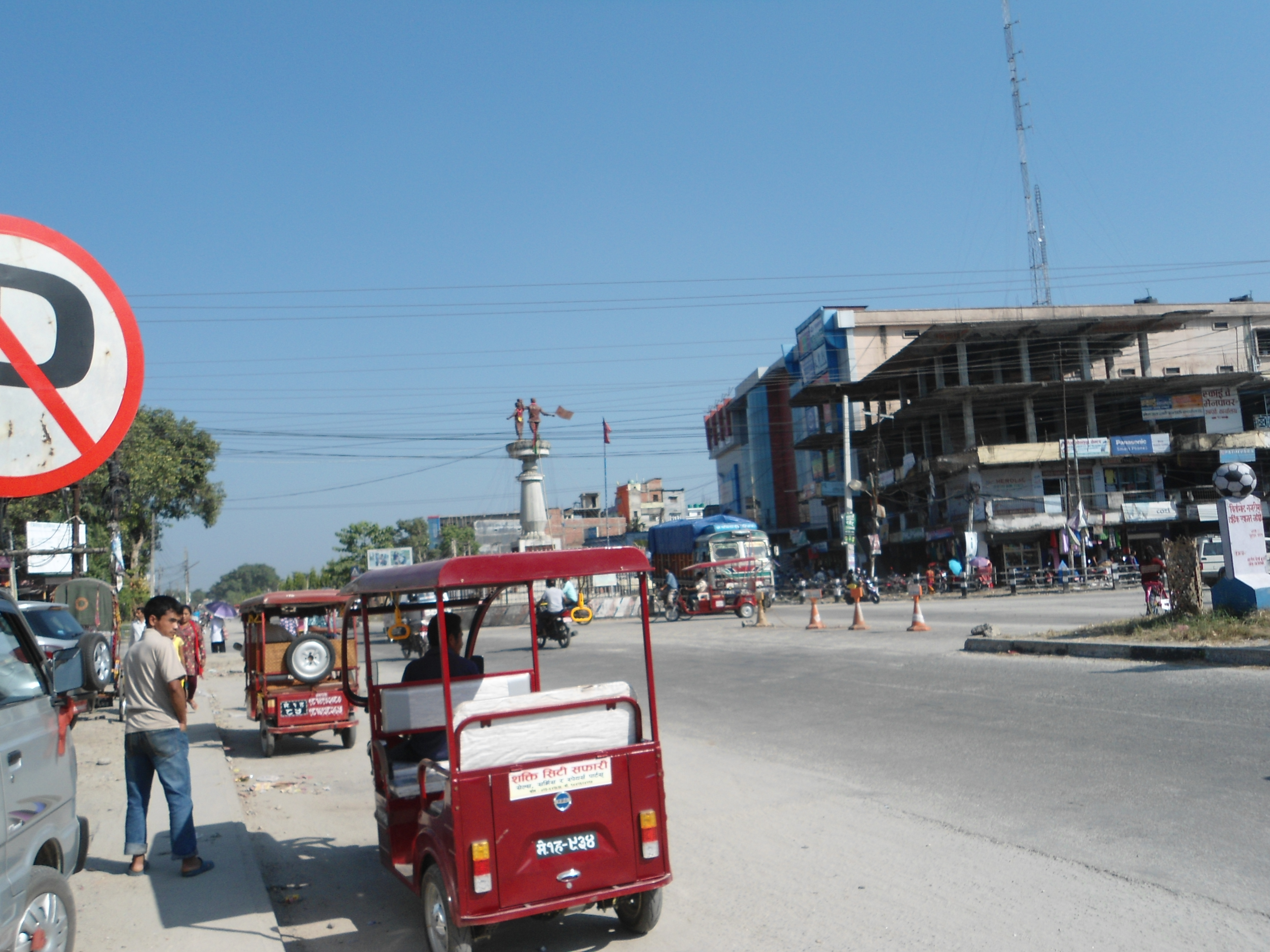

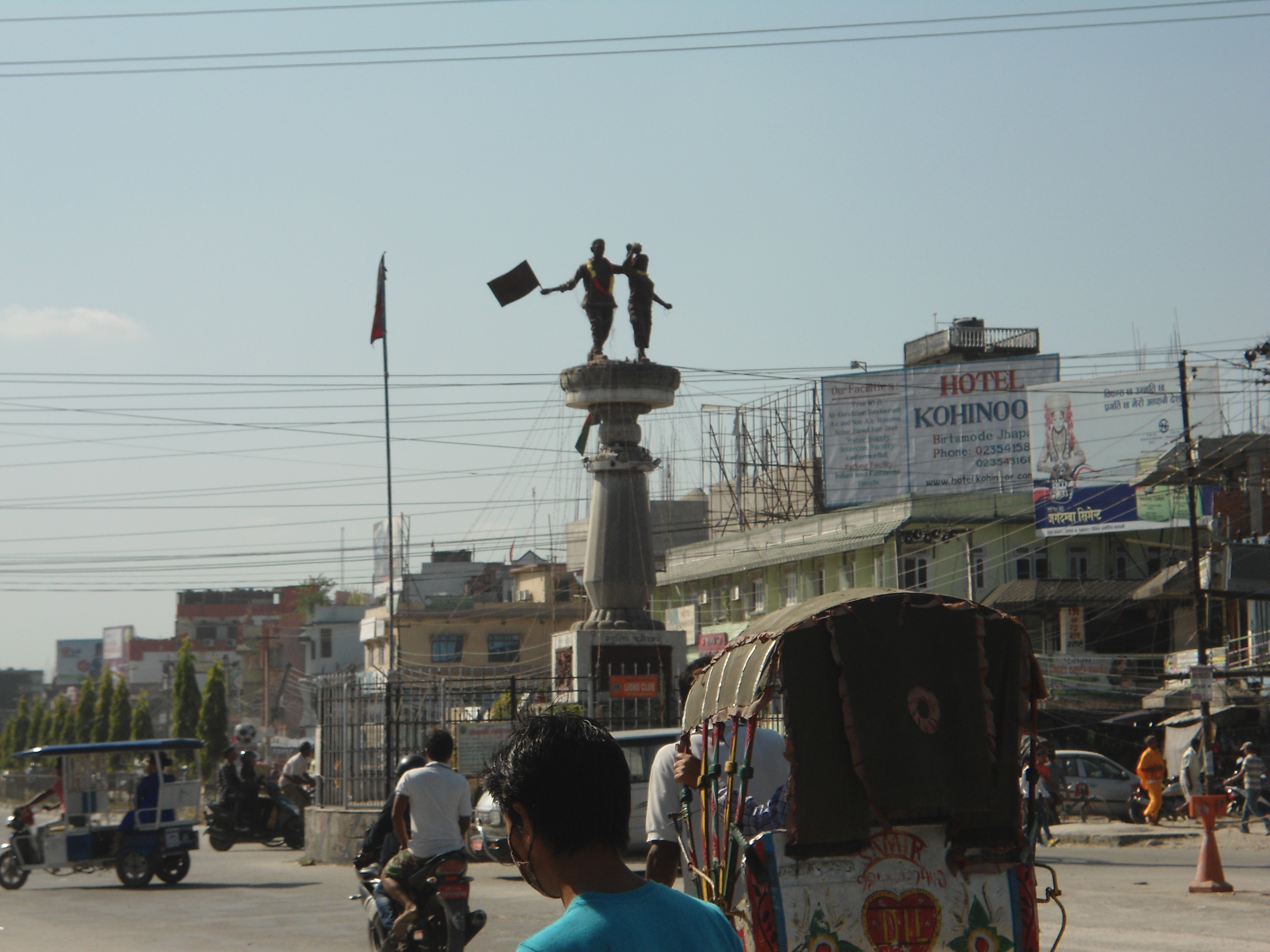
