= N. K. Singh Memorial English Preparatory School =

Boarding school in Minbhawan Kathmandu, Nepal

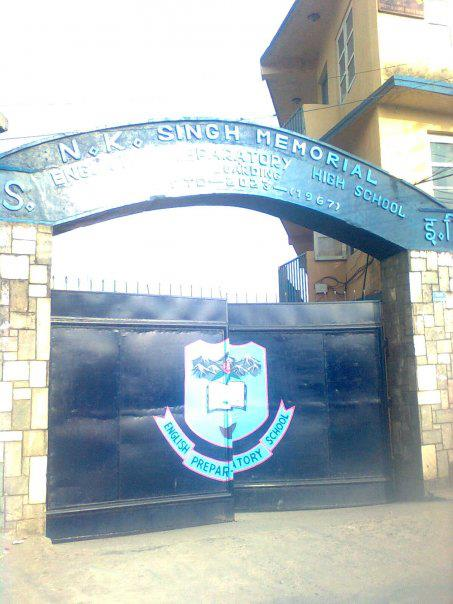
- Entrance gate

Location
- Minbhawan, New Baneshwor; Kathmandu; Nepal

Information
- Type: Independent school, boarding school, coeducational
- Motto: Knowledge is Power
- Established: 1967
- School district: Kathmandu
- Principal: Mrs. Pramila Shingh
- Nickname: EPS
- Website: www.eps.edu.np

N. K. Singh Memorial English Preparatory School is a private boarding school in Nepal. It is one of the most reputed and renowned school in Nepal with 51 year old history.

Its main campus is located in Minbhawan, Baneshwor, Kathmandu. It has a branch school at Lagan. Every year on 10 September the two campuses come together to celebrate its Foundation Day to commemorate the birthday of its late founder, Principal N. K. Singh.

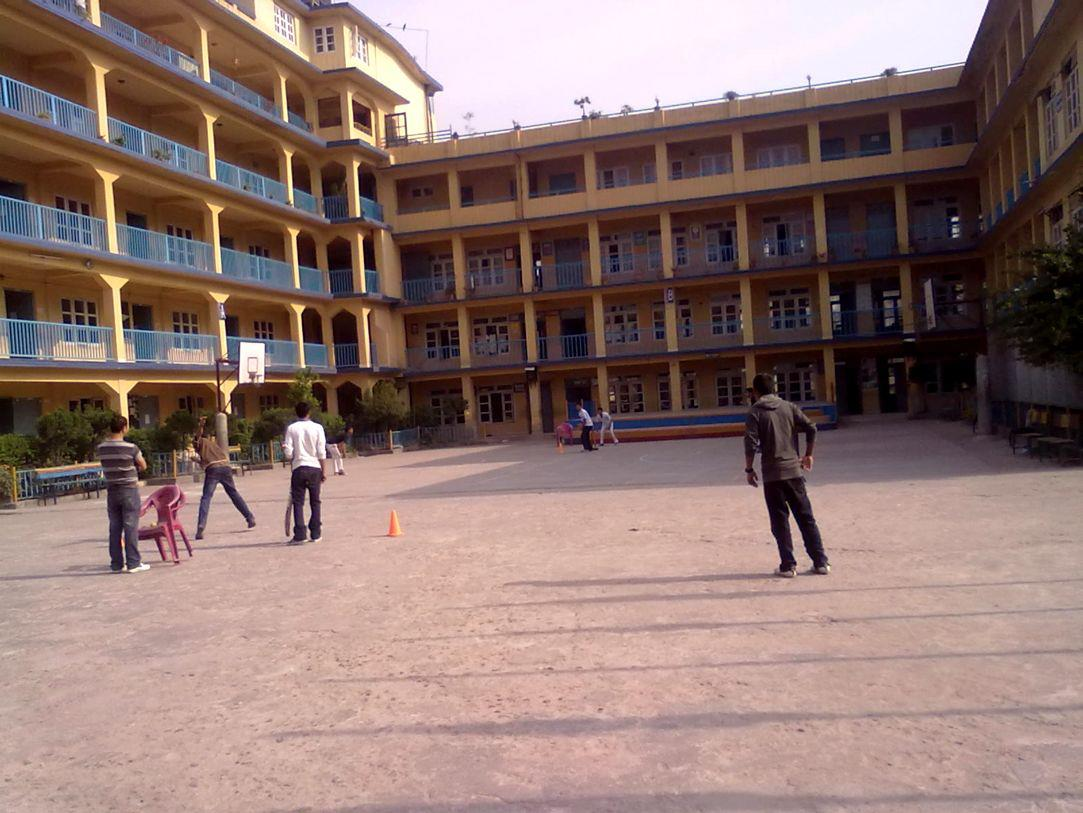
EPS main campus, Min Bhawan

== Overview ==
J.S. Memorial English Preparatory School is a co-educational institution located in Kathmandu that provides education from the pre-primary level up to grade 10.

== Entrance ==
For Entry into the school, students must pass an entrance exam to gain admission into the school. Normally entrance examinations are taken for Nursery to Grade VII from 15th Chaitra.

== Facilities ==
The school offers the many facilities which are as follows:

1. Library and Resource Center which can accommodate 150 students at a time.
2. Computer Lab only for use during computer classes.
3. Science Lab.
4. Transportation to some parts of the city for students.
5. Canteen/Cafeteria.
6. Medical

During the past 51 Years the school has expanded greatly in its infrastructure starting from a small house to a huge campus comprising over four buildings with numerous fields and courts.
