= Gaumukhi Rural Municipality =

Gaumukhi (RM) गौमुखी गाउँपालिका
- Rural Municipality
- Location Gaumukhi (RM) (Nepal)
- Coordinates: 28.24°N 82.99°E
- Country: Nepal
- Province: Lumbini
- District: Pyuthan
- Wards: 7
- Established: 10 March 2017

Government
  - Type: Rural Council
  - Chairperson: Mr. Bishnu Kumar Giri
  - Vice-chairperson: Mr.Mahabir Rana Magar
  - Term of office: (2017 - 2022)

Area
  - Total: 139.04 km^{2} (53.68 sq mi)

Population (2011)
  - Total: 25,421
  - Density: 182.83/km^{2} (473.53/sq mi)
- Time zone: UTC+5:45 (Nepal Standard Time)
- Headquarter: Puja
- Website: gaumukhimun.gov.np

Gaumukhi is a Rural municipality located within the Pyuthan District of the Lumbini Province of Nepal. The rural municipality spans 139.04 square kilometres (53.68 sq mi) of area, with a total population of 25,421 according to a 2011 Nepal census.

On March 10, 2017, the Government of Nepal restructured the local level bodies into 753 new local level structures. The previous Arkha Rajwara, Puja, Khung, portion of Libang and Narikot VDCs were merged to form Gaumukhi Rural Municipality. Gaumukhi is divided into 7 wards, with Puja declared the administrative center of the rural municipality.
