= Naubahini Rural Municipality =

Naubahini (RM) नौबहिनी गाउँपालिका
- Rural Municipality
- Location
- Coordinates: 28.19°N 82.91°E
- Country: Nepal
- Province: Lumbini
- District: Pyuthan
- Wards: 6
- Established: 10 March 2017

Government
  - Type: Rural Council
  - Chairperson: Mr. Shiv Rijal
  - Vice-chairperson: Mr. Ghan Bahadur Budha
  - Term of office: (2017 - 2022)

Area
  - Total: 213.41 km^{2} (82.40 sq mi)

Population (2011)
  - Total: 30,292
  - Density: 141.94/km^{2} (367.63/sq mi)
- Time zone: UTC+5:45 (Nepal Standard Time)
- Headquarter: Lung
- Website: naubahinimun.gov.np

Naubahini is a Rural municipality located within the Pyuthan District of the Lumbini Province of Nepal. The rural municipality spans 213.41 square kilometres (82.40 sq mi) of area, with a total population of 30,292 according to a 2011 Nepal census.

On March 10, 2017, the Government of Nepal restructured the local level bodies into 753 new local level structures. The previous Syaulibang Khabang, Ligha, Lung, Damri and Phopli VDCs were merged to form Naubahini Rural Municipality. Naubahini is divided into 6 wards, with Lung declared the administrative center of the rural municipality.
