= Jhimruk Rural Municipality =

Jhimruk (RM) झिमरुक गाउँपालिका
- Rural Municipality
- Motto: हाम्रो झिमरुक राम्रो झिमरुक
- Location Jhimruk (RM) (Nepal)
- Coordinates: 28.14°N 82.98°E
- Country: Nepal
- Province: Lumbini
- District: Pyuthan
- Wards: 8
- Established: 10 March 2017

Government
  - Type: Rural Council
  - Chairperson: Mr. Pit Bahadur Mahatara (NCP)
  - Vice-chairperson: Mr. Pramod Pokharel (NC)
  - Term of office: (2017 - 2022)

Area
  - Total: 106.93 km^{2} (41.29 sq mi)

Population (2011)
  - Total: 27,931
  - Density: 261.21/km^{2} (676.53/sq mi)
- Time zone: UTC+5:45 (Nepal Standard Time)
- Headquarter: Okharkot
- Website: jhimrukmun.gov.np

Jhimruk is a Rural municipality located within the Pyuthan District of the Lumbini Province of Nepal. The rural municipality spans 106.93 square kilometres (41.29 sq mi) of area, with a total population of 27,931 according to a 2011 Nepal census.

On March 10, 2017, the Government of Nepal restructured the local level bodies into 753 new local level structures. The previous Okharkot Bandikot, Bangemarkot, Torbang, Tusara and Libang (some portion) VDCs were merged to form Jhimruk Rural Municipality. Jhimruk is divided into 8 wards, with Okharkot declared the administrative center of the rural municipality.
