= Maranthana =

Maranthana मरन्ठाना
- Location in Nepal
- Coordinates: 28.11°N 82.91°E
- Country: Nepal
- Region: Mid-Western
- Zone: Rapti Zone
- District: Pyuthan District
- VDC: Maranthana

Population (2001 Census)
  - Total: 4,747
- 922 households
- Time zone: UTC+5:45 (Nepal Time)

Maranthana is a town and market center in Pyuthan Municipality in Pyuthan, a Middle Hills district of Rapti Zone, western Nepal. The formerly Village Development Committee along with Pyuthan Khalanga, Bijubar, Dakha Kwadi, Bijaya Nagar, Dharmawati, Maranthana and Khaira was merged to form the new municipality since 18 May 2014.

== Villages in this VDC ==
		Ward	Lat.	Lon	Elev.
Amdanda	आमडाँडा		28°07'N	82°54'E	1,070m
Anp Pata	आँप पाटा		28°06'N	82°56'E	1,120
Antar Tol	अन्तर टोल		28°07'N	82°56'E	1,490
Badara	बडारा		28°07'N	82°53'E	802
Balde	बल्दे		28°06'N	82°55'E	1,370
Bhandari Pakhara	भँडारी पखरा		28°08'N	82°55'E	1,210
Bhedikhor	भेडीखोर		28°06'N	82°57'E	1,530
Bhusbang	भुसबाङ		28°07'N	82°55'E	950
Chhepane	छेपाने	5	28°06'N	82°55'E	1,315
Chyaukot	च्याउकोट		28°05'N	82°56'E	1,330
Dubichaur	दुबीचौर		28°07'N	82°54'E	1,165
Gahatero	गहतेरो		28°05'N	82°54'E	1,410
Gandapani	गाँडापानी		28°06'N	82°56'E	1,270
Gurigaun	गुरीगाउँ		28°07'N	82°55'E	950
Handigaira	हाँडीगैरा		28°07'N	82°54'E	850
Jahane Pokhara	जहने पोखरा		28°08'N	82°55'E	1,319
Jaikharka	जैखर्क	28°07'N	82°54'E	1,358	
Jaisi Dhage	जैसी धागे	28°07'N	82°56'E	1,290	
Kalleri	कल्लेरी	28°06'N	82°56'E	1,205	
Kaphal Thuto	काफल ठुटो		28°06'N	82°55'E	1,179
Kauchhe	काउछे		28°06'N	82°56'E	1,125
Kharibot	खरीबोट		28°07'N	82°54'E	855
Kholabistagaun	खोलाबिष्टगाउँ		28°05'N	82°57'E	1,290
Kochyan	कोच्यान		28°07'N	82°53'E	1,138
Kolchhapa	कोलछापा		28°08'N	82°55'E	870
Kotdharo	कोटधारो		28°06'N	82°55'E	1,121
Kotgaun	कोटगाउँ		28°06'N	82°54'E	1,571
Moreng	मोरेङ	4	28°06'N	82°56'E	1,510
Nepane	नेपाने	7	28°06'N	82°54'E	1,325
Paharpakha	पाहारपाखा		28°07'N	82°55'E	910
Pakhachiti	पाखाचिटी	8	28°06'N	82°56'E	1,230
Patijhula	पातीझूला		28°06'N	82°57'E	1,698
Pipalneta	पिपलनेटा		28°06'N	82°55'E	1,620
Rotepani	रोटेपानी		28°07'N	82°55'E	1,224
Saribang	सरिबाङ	9	28°07'N	82°53'E	870
Sripale	श्रीपाले		28°07'N	82°56'E	1,430
Subera	सुबेरा		28°06'N	82°57'E	1,218
Syalpakha	स्यालपाखा		28°07'N	82°54'E	918
Tallo Dhage	तल्लो धगे		28°07'N	82°56'E	1,370
Thulasing	ठूलासिङ	3	28°07'N	82°56'E	1,010
Thulo Gaira	ठूलो गैरा		28°07'N	82°56'E	1,250
Todke	टोड्के		28°07'N	82°54'E	1,300
Upallo Dhage	उपल्लो धगे		28°07'N	82°56'E	1,410
