= Dharmawati =

Dharmawati धर्मावती
- Location in Nepal
- Coordinates: 28.12°N 82.88°E
- Country: Nepal
- Region: Mid-Western
- Zone: Rapti Zone
- District: Pyuthan District
- VDC: Dharmawati

Population (2001 Census)
  - Total: 4,186
- 861 households
- Time zone: UTC+5:45 (Nepal Time)

Dharmawati is a town and market center in Pyuthan Municipality in Pyuthan, a Middle Hills district of Rapti Zone, western Nepal. The former Village Development Committee along with Pyuthan Khalanga, Bijubar, Dakha Kwadi, Bijaya Nagar, Dharmawati, Maranthana and Khaira were merged to form the new municipality since 18 May 2014.

== Etymology ==
dharma (Sanskrit: धर्मा) - Religious law or duty; a religion.
wati or vati (Sanskrit: वती) - manifesting the quality.
Thus pious, observant, or religious.

== Villages in VDC ==
		Ward	Lat.	Lon	Elev.
Bagdula	बागदुला	1	28°07'N	82°53'E	828m
Bange	बाङ्गे		28°09'N	82°53'E	1,090
Batule	बाटुले		28°09'N	82°54'E	1,010
Bhalapani	भलापानी		28°09'N	82°53'E	1,215
Bhedabari	भेडाबारी	5	28°09'N	82°53'E	1,210
Chyandhara	च्यानधारा		28°10'N	82°53'E	1,230
Damti	दम्ती		28°09'N	82°54'E	925
Dhaire	धाइरे		28°09'N	82°54'E	958
Gejbang	गेजबाङ	3	28°08'N	82°54'E	850
Githechaur	गिठेचौर		28°08'N	82°53'E	1,315
Kapdanda	कापडाँडा		28°07'N	82°53'E	1,110
Lamidhara	लामीधारा		28°08'N	82°53'E	1,210
Managaun	मानागाउँ		28°09'N	82°53'E	1,330
Padbang	पाडबाङ		28°09'N	82°54'E	915
Rajyan	रज्यान	6	28°08'N	82°54'E	1,146
Ranikamla	रानीकाम्ला		28°08'N	82°53'E	1,075
Shivanagar	शिवनगर		28°08'N	82°54'E	850
Suryanagar	सूर्यनगर		28°08'N	82°53'E	835
Takura	टाकुरा		28°08'N	82°53'E	950
Tal	ताल		28°08'N	82°53'E	838
Thapkot	थापकोट		28°08'N	82°53'E	1,243
Tikhchuli	तिखचुली		28°10'N	82°53'E	1,476
Upallo Damti	उपल्लो दम्ती		28°09'N	82°54'E	1,130
