= Mandavi Rural Municipality =

Mandavi (RM) माण्डवी गाउँपालिका
- Rural Municipality
- Location Mandavi (RM) (Nepal)
- Coordinates: 28.08°N 82.80°E
- Country: Nepal
- Province: Lumbini
- District: Pyuthan
- Wards: 5
- Established: 10 March 2017

Government
  - Type: Rural Council
  - Chairperson: Mr.Navaraj Adhikari
  - Vice-chairperson: Mr.Purna Prasad Kalathoki
  - Term of office: BS(2079- 2084)

Area
  - Total: 113.08 km^{2} (43.66 sq mi)

Population (2011)
  - Total: 15,058
  - Density: 133.16/km^{2} (344.89/sq mi)
- Time zone: UTC+5:45 (Nepal Standard Time)
- Headquarter: Naya Gaun
- Website: mandavimun.gov.np

Mandavi is a Rural municipality located within the Pyuthan District of the Lumbini Province of Nepal. The rural municipality spans 113.08 square kilometres (43.66 sq mi) of area, with a total population of 15,058 according to a 2011 Nepal census.

On March 10, 2017, the Government of Nepal restructured the local level bodies into 753 new local level structures. The previous Markabang, portion of Tiram, Naya Gaun, Ramdi and Dhobaghat VDCs were merged to form Mandavi Rural Municipality. Mandavi is divided into 5 wards, with Naya Gaun declared the administrative center of the rural municipality.
