= Mallarani Rural Municipality =

Mallarani (RM) मल्लरानी गाउँपालिका
- Rural Municipality
- Location Mallarani (RM) (Nepal)
- Coordinates: 28°05′28″N 82°52′57″E
- Country: Nepal
- Province: Lumbini
- District: Pyuthan
- Wards: 5
- Established: 10 March 2017

Government
  - Type: Rural Council
  - Chairperson: Mr. Amardhwaj Rana
  - Vice-chairperson: Mrs. Sarita GC
  - Term of office: (2017 - 2022)

Area
  - Total: 80.09 km^{2} (30.92 sq mi)

Population (2011)
  - Total: 17,686
  - Density: 220.8/km^{2} (571.9/sq mi)
- Time zone: UTC+5:45 (Nepal Standard Time)
- Headquarter: Mallarani
- Website: mallaranimun.gov.np

Mallarani is a Rural municipality located within the Pyuthan District of the Lumbini Province of Nepal. The rural municipality spans 80.09 square kilometres (30.92 sq mi) of area, with a total population of 17,686 according to a 2011 Nepal census.

On March 10, 2017, the Government of Nepal restructured the local level bodies into 753 new local level structures. The previous Chunja, Dharampani, portion of Raspurkot VDCs and some part of old Pyuthan Municipality were merged to form Mallarani Rural Municipality. Mallarani is divided into 5 wards, with old headquarter of Pyuthan Municipality declared the administrative center of the rural municipality.
