= Sarumarani Rural Municipality =

Sarumarani (RM) सरुमारानी गाउँपालिका
- Rural Municipality
- Location Sarumarani (RM) (Nepal)
- Coordinates: 27.96°N 82.80°E
- Country: Nepal
- Province: Lumbini
- District: Pyuthan
- Wards: 6
- Established: 10 March 2017

Government
  - Type: Rural Council
  - Chairperson: Mr. Jhag Bahadur Bishwakarma
  - Vice-chairperson: Mrs. Mina Kumari Somai
  - Term of office: (2017 - 2022)

Area
  - Total: 157.97 km^{2} (60.99 sq mi)

Population (2011)
  - Total: 18,627
  - Density: 117.91/km^{2} (305.40/sq mi)
- Time zone: UTC+5:45 (Nepal Standard Time)
- Headquarter: Dhungegadhi
- Website: sarumaranimun.gov.np

Sarumarani is a Rural municipality located within the Pyuthan District of the Lumbini Province of Nepal. The rural municipality spans 157.97 square kilometres (60.99 sq mi) of area, with a total population of 18,627 according to a 2011 Nepal census.

On March 10, 2017, the Government of Nepal restructured the local level bodies into 753 new local level structures. The previous Bangesal, Hansapur, Dhungegadhi, some portion of Dhubang and portion of Tiram VDCs were merged to form Sarumarani Rural Municipality. Sarumarani is divided into 6 wards, with Dhungegadhi declared the administrative center of the rural municipality.

== Demographics ==
At the time of the 2011 Nepal census, Sarumarani Rural Municipality had a population of 18,657. Of these, 83.0% spoke Nepali, 15.2% Magar, 0.9% Gurung, 0.2% Bhojpuri, 0.2% Newar, 0.2% Urdu, 0.1% Hindi, 0.1% Tharu and 0.1% other languages as their first language.

In terms of ethnicity/caste, 53.9% were Magar, 11.8% Kami, 8.0% Chhetri, 5.2% Hill Brahmin, 4.6% Kumal, 3.8% Gurung, 3.1% Tharu 2.9% Damai/Dholi, 2.5% Musalman, 1.3% Sanyasi/Dasnami, 0.9% Newar, 0.9% Sarki, 0.6% Badi, 0.1% foreigners, 0.1% Gaine, 0.1% Kusunda, 0.1% Thakuri and 0.1% others.

In terms of religion, 93.1% were Hindu, 4.0% Buddhist, 2.5% Muslim and 0.3% Christian.

In terms of literacy, 68.7% could read and write, 1.9% could only read and 29.4% could neither read nor write.
