= Bijaya Nagar =

Place in Mid-Western, Nepal

Bijaya Nagar बिजय नगर
- Location in Nepal
- Coordinates: 28.10°N 82.85°E
- Country: Nepal
- Region: Mid-Western
- Zone: Rapti Zone
- District: Pyuthan District
- VDC: Bijaya Nagar

Population (2001 Census)
  - Total: 3,295
- 697 households
- Time zone: UTC+5:45 (Nepal Time)

Bijaya Nagar is a town and market center located in Pyuthan Municipality in Pyuthan, a Middle Hills district of Lumbini Province, western Nepal. The formerly Village Development Committee along with Pyuthan Khalanga, Bijubar, Dakha Kwadi, Bijaya Nagar, Dharmawati, Maranthana and Khaira was merged to form the new municipality since 18 May 2014.

== Etymology ==
Bijaya (Nepali: बिजय) or Vijaya (Sanskrit: विजय) - victory.
Nagar (Sanskrit: नगर) - settlement or city.
Thus Victory City.

== Villages in VDC ==
		Ward	Lat.	Lon	Elev.
Daili Simal	दैली सिमल		28°7'N	82°50'E	990m
Ghurchane	घुर्चौने		28°8'N	82°50'E	1,050
Jhungakholagaun	झुङखोलागाउँ		28°8'N	82°49E	1,085
Kumalgaun	कुमालगाउँ		28°6'N	82°51'E	938
Kuwapani	कुवापानी		28°8'N	82°50'E	1,016
Mandrechaur	मान्द्रेचौर	6	28°8'N	82°49'E	1,490
Okharbot	ओखरबोट	6	28°9'N	82°49'E	1,689
Ratamata	रातामाटा	3	28°6'N	82°51'E	798
Richi	रिची		28°8'N	82°48'E	1,490
Sapdanda	सापडाँडा	4	28°7'N	82°50'E	925
Sepung	सेपुङ	8	28°8'N	82°49'E	1,470
Sirbari	सिरबारी		28°8'N	82°49'E	1,662
Timilepata	तिमिलेपाटा		28°8'N	82°48'E	1,635

== Education ==
- Mukti High School
