= Dakha Kwadi =

Dakha Kwadi दाखा क्वाडी
- Location in Nepal
- Coordinates: 28.10°N 82.81°E
- Country: Nepal
- Region: Mid-Western
- Zone: Rapti Zone
- District: Pyuthan District
- VDC: Dakha Kwadi

Population (2001 Census)
  - Total: 4,916
- 1,002 households
- Time zone: UTC+5:45 (Nepal Time)

Dakha Kwadi is a town and market center in Pyuthan Municipality of Pyuthan, a Middle Hills district of Rapti Zone, western Nepal. The former Village Development Committee along with Pyuthan Khalanga, Bijubar, Dakha Kwadi, Bijaya Nagar, Dharmawati, Maranthana and Khaira were merged to form the new municipality since 18 May 2014.

== Villages in VDC ==
		Ward	Lat.	Lon	Elev.
Arneta	आरनेटा		28°07'N	82°48'E	1,158m
Bhalbang	भलबाङ		28°06'N	82°47'E	598
Cherneta	चेरनेटा		28°05'N	82°49'E	845
Chisapani	चिसापानी		28°06'N	82°50'E	1,030
Chitikholagaun	चितिखोलागाउँ	5	28°07'N	82°49'E	1,035
Dakha Kwadi	दाखा क्वाडी		28°05'N	82°50'E	790
Dakha Ratamata	दाखा रातामाटा		28°07'N	82°48'E	1,195
Dakhakot	दाखाकोट		28°06'N	82°49'E	1,245
Dhairechaur	धाइरेचौर	8	28°06'N	82°47'E	618
Dhanda	ढाँडा		28°08'N	82°48'E	1,170
Harikholagau	हरिखोलागाउँ	2	28°06'N	82°50'E	810
Katte Pokhara	कट्टेपोखरा		28°07'N	82°48'E	1,248
Kuwapani	कुवापानी		28°06'N	82°50'E	1,004
Maseri	मसेरी		28°08'N	82°48'E	1,270
Parpakha	पारपाखा		28°07'N	82°50'E	905
Phulghat	फुलघाट		28°05'N	82°48'E	570
Ranikot	रानीकोट		28°06'N	82°49'E	1,298
Riman	रिमान		28°06'N	82°49'E	1,230
Sajkharka	साजखर्क		28°07'N	82°48'E	1,090
Salghari	सालघारी		28°05'N	82°48'E	630
