= Airawati Rural Municipality =

Airawati (RM) ऐरावती गाउँपालिका
- Rural Municipality
- Location Airawati (RM) (Nepal)
- Coordinates: 27.98°N 82.94°E
- Country: Nepal
- Province: Lumbini
- District: Pyuthan
- Wards: 6
- Established: 10 March 2017

Government
  - Type: Rural Council
  - Chairperson: Mr. Nabil Bikram Shah
  - Vice-chairperson: Mr. Buddha Bahadur Basnet
  - Term of office: (2017 - 2022)

Area
  - Total: 156.75 km^{2} (60.52 sq mi)

Population (2011)
  - Total: 22,392
  - Density: 142.85/km^{2} (369.98/sq mi)
- Time zone: UTC+5:45 (Nepal Standard Time)
- Headquarter: Baraula
- Website: airawatimun.gov.np

Airawati is a Rural municipality located within the Pyuthan District of the Lumbini Province of Nepal. The rural municipality spans 156.75 square kilometres (60.52 sq mi) of area, with a total population of 22,392 according to a 2011 Nepal census.

On March 10, 2017, the Government of Nepal restructured the local level bodies into 753 new local level structures. The previous Dangbang Baraula, Pakla, Bijuli, Dhubang (some portion not included) and Raspurkot (some portion not included) VDCs were merged to form Airawati Rural Municipality. Airawati is divided into 6 wards, with Baraula declared the administrative center of the rural municipality.
