= National Highway 19 (Nepal) =

Highway in Nepal

Ridi-Ramdi Highway रिडी-राम्दी राजमार्ग
- राष्ट्रिय राजमार्ग १९
- National Highway 19
- NH19 in red

Route information
- Maintained by MoPIT (Department of Roads)
- Length: 163.92 km (101.86 mi)

Major junctions
- East end: Ridi
- Tamaghas, Ghartidada, Sandhikhark,
- West end: Ramdi

Location
- Country: Nepal
- Provinces: Lumbini Province
- Districts: Gulmi District, Arghakhanchi District, Pyuthan District

Highway system
- Roads in Nepal
← NH18	→ NH20

National Highway 19 (NH19) is a 163.93-kilometre (101.86 mi) National Highway located in Lumbini Province of Nepal. The old Highway was the Shabha-Bramhadev Highway.

== Details ==
The highway passes through three districts of Lumbini Province; Gulmi District, Arghakhanchi District and Pyuthan District. The highway starts at Ridi Bazar, Ruru Rural Municipality in Gulmi District bisecting from Madan Bhandari Highway (NH9), then it proceeds to Neta Gau in Resunga Municipality passing through Chhatrakot Rural Municipality and Gulmi Darbar Rural Municipality. The highway crosses the district border near Neta Gau and enters into Arghakhanchi District and intersects to Madan Bhandari Highway (NH09) in Chhatradev Rural Municipality. The highway bisects again in Sandhikharka (Arghakhanchi District) and proceeds to Bhumikasthan Municipality then it crosses the border at Lamadada and enters into Pyuthan District. The highway then passeses through Airawati Rural Municipality and terminates at Rimdi merging with Madan Bhandari Highway (NH09) in Mandavi Rural Municipality.

Feeder road F043 and F134 were upgraded to NH19

Road Details
#	Section	Length (km)	Status
1	Ridi-Gaudakot	32.36	BT
2	Gaudakot-Tamghas	09.59	BT
3	Tamghas-Netagau	06.00	2.58(BT), 3.42(ER)
4	Netagau-Ghartidada	20.32	ER
5	Sandhikhark-Lamadada	45.42	ER
6	Lamadada-Ramdi	53.65	ER
