= Swargadwarikhal =

Swargadwarikhal स्वर्गद्धारी खाल
- Village Development Committee
- Location in Nepal
- Coordinates: 28.15°N 82.64°E
- Country: Nepal
- Region: Mid-Western
- Zone: Rapti Zone
- District: Pyuthan District
- VDC: Swargadwarikhal

Population (2001 Census)
  - Total: 3,808
- 751 households
- Time zone: UTC+5:45 (Nepal Time)

Swargadwarikhal is a Village Development Committee in Pyuthan, a Middle Hills district of Rapti Zone, western Nepal.

== Villages in this VDC ==
		Ward	Lat.	Lon	Elev.
Adebas	अडेबास	4	28°09'N	82°38'E	1,490m
Bajam	बाजम	9	28°07'N	82°37'E	1,242
Balidhara	बलिधारा		28°09'N	82°39'E	1,495
Bandrekhola gaun	बान्द्रेखोलागाउँ		28°08'N	82°36'E	1,262
Bhalkuna	भलकुना		28°08'N	82°37'E	1,551
Daban	दबन		28°10'N	82°38'E	1,370
Daiya	दैया		28°08'N	82°36'E	1,618
Dhanbang	धनबाङ	1	28°09'N	82°40'E	1,393
Dhanbangdanda	धनबाङडाँडा		28°09'N	82°39'E	1,725
Dhandanda	धनडाँडा		28°08'N	82°37'E	1,479
Ghorkholagaun	घोरखोलागाउँ		28°10'N	82°37'E	1,020
Hamja	हम्जा	5	28°10'N	82°38'E	1,315
Hartap	हार्ताप		28°09'N	82°37'E	1,470
Jhurbang	झुर्बाङ		28°07'N	82°37'E	1,338
Jogimara	जोगीमारा		28°08'N	82°40'E	1,885
Khal	खाल		28°08'N	82°37'E	1,650
Libja	लिब्जा		28°08'N	82°39'E	1,671
Nayagaun	नयाँगाउँ	6	28°10'N	82°37'E	1,250
Nos	नोस	7	28°09'N	82°37'E	1,478
Palla Dhanbang	पल्ला धनबाङ		28°09'N	82°40'E	1,330
Ritdada	रितडाँडा		28°08'N	82°36'E	1,250
Salle	सल्ले		28°10'N	82°39'E	1,270
Sirbigaira	सिर्बि गैरा		28°08'N	82°36'E	1,718
Sirwali	सिर्वाली		28°10'N	82°40'E	1,685
Tallo Malarani	तल्लो मालारानी		28°10'N	82°40'E	1,598
Untuk	उनतुक		28°07'N	82°37'E	1,340
