= Bijuwar =

Bijuwar बिजुवार
- Location in Nepal
- Coordinates: 28.12°N 82.86°E
- Country: Nepal
- Region: Mid-Western
- Zone: Rapti Zone
- District: Pyuthan District
- VDC: XXX

Population (2001 Census)
  - Total: 4,976
- 967 households
- Time zone: UTC+5:45 (Nepal Time)

Bijuwar is a town and market center in Pyuthan Municipality in Pyuthan, a Middle Hills district of Rapti Zone, western Nepal. The former Village Development Committee along with Pyuthan Khalanga, Bijubar, Dakha Kwadi, Bijaya Nagar, Dharmawati, Maranthana and Khaira were merged to form the new municipality since 18 May 2014. Bijuwar is the main commercial center in the valley of Jhimruk Khola.

To Promote local culture Bijuwar has one FM radio station Radio Lisne Awaj - 103.6 MHz Which is a Community radio Station.

== Villages in VDC ==
		Ward	Lat.	Lon	Elev.
Bhitrikot	भित्रीकोट		28°08'N	82°51'E	1,550m
Bijuwar	बिजुवार		28°06'N	82°51'E	830
Dadi Pokhari	डाडी पोखरी		28°08'N	82°51'E	1,505
Dharampani	धरमपानी		28°08'N	82°52'E	1,310
Githechaur	गिठेचौर		28°08'N	82°52'E	1,350
Indredanda	इन्द्रेडाँडा	8	28°07'N	82°51'E	999
Kanthebahar	काँठेबहर		28°08'N	82°50'E	1,070
Khadkadera	खड्काडेरा		28°08'N	82°50'E	1,130
Khamaldi	खमाल्दी		28°07'N	82°52'E	790
Khanikholagaun	खानीखोलागाउँ		28°07'N	82°51'E	882
Phulbari	फूलबारी		28°07'N	82°52'E	815
Punyakholagaun	पुण्यखोलागाउँ	4	28°08'N	82°52'E	975
Seti Pokhari	सेती पोखरी		28°08'N	82°51'E	1,042
Takura	टाकुरा	1	28°07'N	82°52'E	950
Tari		7			
Tarkichaur	तार्कीचौर	1	28°08'N	82°51'E	1,470
Tikuri	टिकुरी		28°07'N	82°53'E	815

Radio: Radio Lisne Awaj 103.6 MHz
