= Kochibang =

Kochibang कोचीबाङ
- Village Development Committee
- Location in Nepal
- Coordinates: 28.09°N 82.65°E
- Country: Nepal
- Region: Mid-Western
- Zone: Rapti Zone
- District: Pyuthan District
- VDC: Kochibang

Population (2001 Census)
  - Total: 2,630
- 482 households
- Time zone: UTC+5:45 (Nepal Time)

Kochibang is a village and Village Development Committee in Pyuthan, a Middle Hills district of Rapti Zone, western Nepal.

== Inner villages ==
		Ward	Lat.	Lon	Elev.
Amdanda	आमडाँडा		28°06'N	82°39'E	1,235m
Ampata	आमपाटा		28°05'N	82°37'E	910
Baksing	बाक्सिङ		28°07'N	82°37'E	1,208
Bahrabise	बाह्रबिसे		28°04'N	82°38'E	870
Bhaldanda	भलडाँडा		28°06'N	82°39'E	1,275
Bhanjyang	भञ्ज्याङ		28°07'N	82°38'E	1,635
Bhompa	भोम्पा		28°06'N	82°37'E	1,265
Dabang	दाबाङ		28°05'N	82°39'E	1,234
Danda Kateri	डाँडा कटेरी		28°05'N	82°41'E	1,235
Dharampani	धरमपानी		28°07'N	82°40'E	1,930
Ghurche	घुर्चे		28°06'N	82°37'E	1,570
Jhupeli	झुपेली		28°06'N	82°40'E	1,638
Jogithum	जोगीथुम		28°03'N	82°41'E	950
Kali Pokhari	काली पोखरी		28°05'N	82°42'E	1,710
Khalte	खाल्टे		28°05'N	82°38'E	1,210
Kochibang	कोचीबाङ	1	28°05'N	82°40'E	1,415
Kusunde	कुसुण्डे	2	28°04'N	82°41'E	1,590
Laksmi Khoriya	लक्ष्मी खोरिया		28°06'N	82°38'E	1,461
Lami Khorya	लामी खोरिया		28°06'N	82°37'E	1,219
Mirsing	मिर्सिङ		28°05'N	82°38'E	1,170
Rum	रुम	28°05'N	4	82°39'E	1,435
Rumdanda	रुमडाँडा		28°05'N	82°40'E	1,608
Rupakot	रुपाकोट		28°05'N	82°41'E	1,310
Sakribang	साक्रीबाङ		28°06'N	82°39'E	1,513
Sallabot	सल्लाबोट	3	28°04'N	82°40'E	1,149
Tar	टार		28°06'N	82°36'E	895
Tirmire	तिरमिरे		28°05'N	82°40'E	1,290
