= Bangesal =

Bangesal Nepal वांगेशाल
- Village Development Committee
- Location in Nepal
- Coordinates: 27°54′43″N 82°50′59″E
- Country: Nepal
- Region: Mid-Western
- Zone: Rapti Zone
- District: Pyuthan District
- VDC: Bangesal
- Elevation -- at Bangesal village: 368 m (1,207 ft)
- Highest elevation: 1,080 m (3,540 ft)
- Lowest elevation: 323 m (1,060 ft)

Population (2001 Census)
  - Total: 3,759
- 638 households
- Time zone: UTC+5:45 (Nepal Time)

Bangesal is both a town and Pyuthan District, Nepal's southernmost Village Development Committee; also Pyuthan's lowest in elevation. This VDC is in the Siwalik hills north of Deukhuri Valley.

Elevations range from 323 metres (1,060 ft) at the confluence of Rangle Khola with the West Rapti River bordering Dang district, up to 1,080 metres (3,540 ft) on the crest of the Siwaliks. Except for a few hectares exceeding 1,000 metres elevation, Bangesal falls into Nepal's upper tropical climate zone.

== Villages in VDC ==
		Ward	Lat.	Lon	Elev.
Aatitar	आटीटार		27°55'N	82°51'E	390m
Aduwabari	अदुवाबारी		27°55'N	82°47'E	430
Amiladhik	अमिलाढिक		27°54'N	82°47'E	390
Auleni	औलेनी		27°55'N	82°50'E	350
Badanekhola gaun	बदनेखोलागाउँ		27°55'N	82°51'E	370
Baghkhor	बाघखोर		27°53'N	82°48'E	410
Bahunpata	बाहुनपाटा		27°54'N	82°47'E	390
Bangesal	बाङ्गेसाल		27°54'N	82°51'E	368
Barnabir	बर्नबिर		27°56'N	82°50'E	390
Bhampali	भमपाली		27°56'N	82°50'E	510
Bhulke	भुल्के		27°56'N	82°50'E	470
Bribagar	बृबगर		27°55'N	82°47'E	390
Budhigara	बुढिगरा		27°54'N	82°47'E	390
Charingge	चरिङ्गे		27°54'N	82°47'E	370
Chhekka	छेक्का		27°54'N	82°47'E	410
Chisapani	चिसापानी		27°54'N	82°49'E	350
Dadari	ददरी	7	27°53'N	82°49'E	330
Darbhan	दरभान		27°55'N	82°50'E	358
Dhadra	धाद्र		27°55'N	82°52'E	381
Dhandgaun	ढाँडगाउँ		27°54'N	82°48'E	410
Gal Kharkhola gaun	गल खारखोलागाउँ		27°53'N	82°48'E	350
Ganahakhola gaun	गनाहाखोलागाउँ	9	27°54'N	82°48'E	350
Jhilibang	झिलीबाङ		27°55'N	82°53'E	410
Jogi Dhungga	जोगी ढुङ्गा		27°53'N	82°48'E	350
Kalibang	कालीबाङ		27°55'N	82°53'E	368
Kaskot	कासकोट		27°57'N	82°52'E	990
Kharpani	खारपानी		27°55'N	82°51'E	370
Maidan	मैदान		27°55'N	82°50'E	416
Masure	मसुरे		27°55'N	82°50'E	390
Mathillo Dhanda	माथिल्लो ढाँड		27°55'N	82°49'E	370
Phoshrabang	फोश्राबाङ	2	27°55'N	82°52'E	388
Ratne	रत्ने		27°55'N	82°50'E	370
Rato Pahara	रातो पहरा		27°53'N	82°48'E	370
Sano Khoriya	सानो खोरिया		27°55'N	82°51'E	350
Tala	ताल		27°54'N	82°51'E	350
Tallo Dhanda	तल्लो ढाँड		27°54'N	82°49'E	370
