= Dangbang =

Dangwang दाङबाङ
- Village Development Committee
- Location in Nepal
- Coordinates: 27.95°N 82.98°E
- Country: Nepal
- Region: Mid-Western
- Zone: Rapti Zone
- District: Pyuthan District
- VDC: Dangbang

Population (2001 Census)
  - Total: 3,719
- 608 households
- Time zone: UTC+5:45 (Nepal Time)

Dangbang is a town and Village Development Committee in Pyuthan, a Middle Hills district of Rapti Zone, western Nepal.

== Villages in VDC ==
		Ward	Lat.	Lon	Elev.
Airabati	ऐराबती		27°56'N	82°57'E	470m
Amili	अमिली	4	27°57'N	82°58'E	1,410
Angri	अङग्री		27°59'N	82°59'E	550
Baji Pokhari	बाजी पोखरी		27°57'N	82°59'E	1,370
Batchaur	बाटचौर		27°57'N	83°00'E	1,370
Belbot	बेलबोट	4	27°56'N	82°58'E	830
Besi	बेसी		27°56'N	82°58'E	410
Bukeni	बुकेनी		27°58'N	82°58'E	890
Chaklaghat	चाक्लाघाट		27°58'N	83°00'E	530
Chendhara	चेनधारा		27°58'N	82°59'E	1,213
Chheda	छेडा		27°56'N	83°01'E	483
Dabar	डाबर		27°56'N	82°59'E	430
Dangbang	दाङबाङ		27°59'N	82°58'E	1,190
Deurali	देउराली		27°58'N	82°58'E	1,236
Dhanbot	धानबोट		27°58'N	82°58'E	1,410
Ghakse	घाक्से		27°57'N	82°57'E	1,210
Juda	जुडा		27°59'N	83°00'E	550
Khalneta	खल्नेटा		27°58'N	82°58'E	1,470
Kolbot	कोलबोट	6	27°57'N	83°00'E	1,336
Kudule	कुडुले		27°56'N	82°58'E	410
Majhi Damar	माझी दमार		27°56'N	82°59'E	490
Majhkhanda	माझखण्ड		27°55'N	83°01'E	520
Mandre	मान्द्रे		27°58'N	83°00'E	1,213
Mandrechaur	मान्द्रेचौर		27°57'N	83°00'E	1,013
Pateri	पतेरी		27°58'N	83°00'E	570
Rengra	रेङ्गरा		27°59'N	82°58'E	590
Sajbot	साजबोट		27°59'N	82°59'E	590
Sallekot	सल्लेकोट	3	27°56'N	82°57'E	910
Sarwas	सर्वास		27°57'N	82°58'E	1,310
Simpani	सिमपानी		27°56'N	83°01'E	530
Sirsini	सिर्सिनी	5	27°58'N	82°58'E	1,450
Takura	टाकुरा		27°58'N	82°59'E	1,050
