= Syaulibang =

Syaulibang स्याउलीबाङ
- Village Development Committee
- Location in Nepal
- Coordinates: 28°18′45″N 82°56′54″E
- Country: Nepal
- Region: Mid-Western
- Zone: Rapti Zone
- District: Pyuthan District
- VDC: Syaulibang
- Elevation --Syaulibang Village: 1,706 m (5,597 ft)
- Highest elevation: 3,612 m (11,850 ft)
- Lowest elevation: 1,500 m (4,900 ft)

Population (2001 Census)
  - Total: 2,741
- 462 households
- Time zone: UTC+5:45 (Nepal Time)

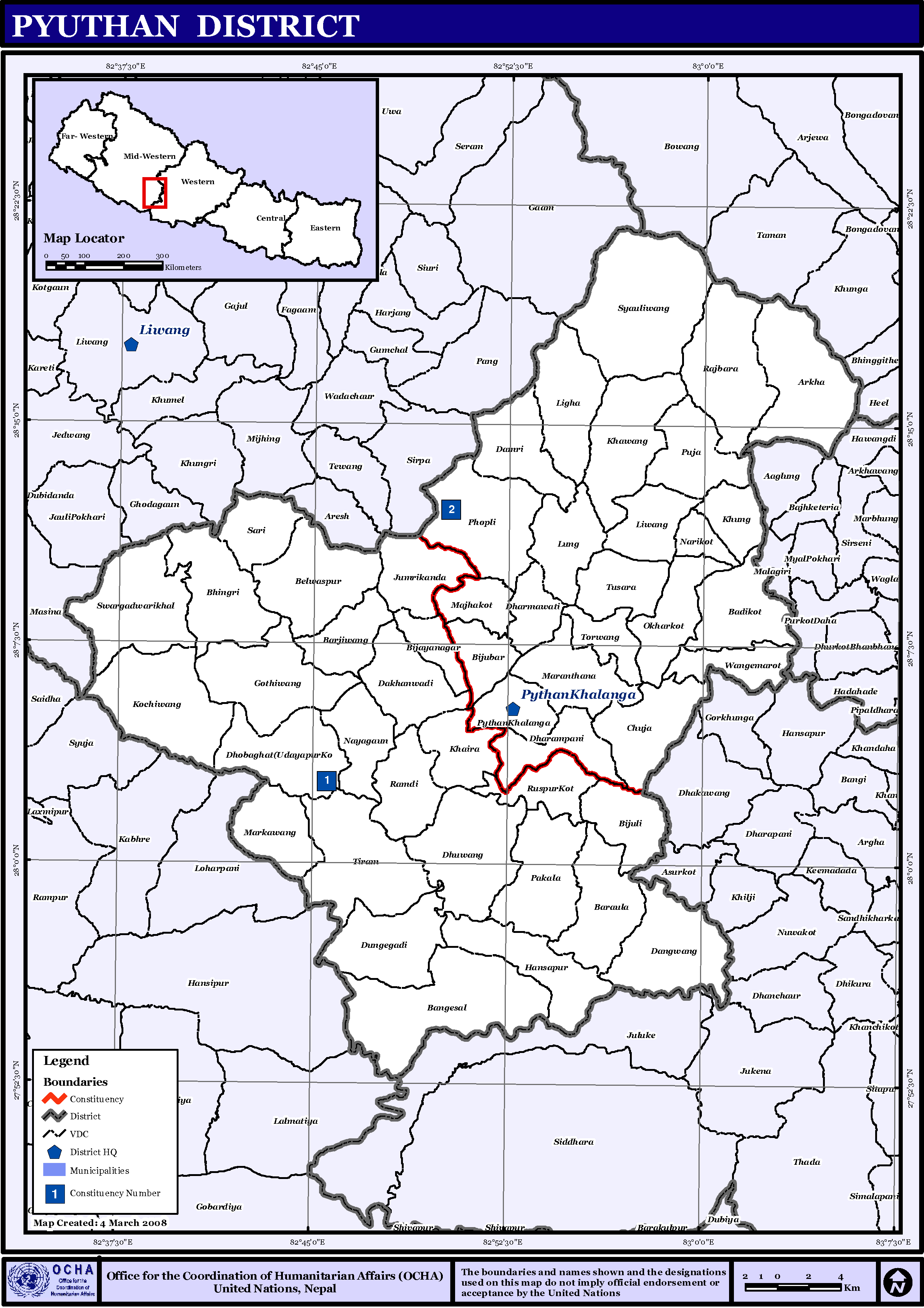
VDCs in Pyuthan

Syaulibang is a village and Village Development Committee in Pyuthan, a Middle Hills district of Rapti Zone, western Nepal.

== Etymology ==
In Khamkura Syauli means apple. Bang means a high field or pasture, usually above 2,000 meters where snow can fall, suggesting a climate with enough winter cold for cultivating apples, so 'Apple Orchard' is a reasonable translation of this place name.

== Geography and Climate ==
Syaulibang is Pyuthan district's northernmost VDC, bordering Gaam VDC in Rolpa to the northwest and Baglung district's [ Nisi and Bohoragau VDC now Nisikhola Gaupalika Nepal|Bowang]] and Taman VDCs to the northeast. Syaulibang is also Pyuthan's highest VDC, ranging from about 1,500 metres (4,900 ft) up to a 3,612 metres (11,850 ft) summit at the meeting point of Syaulibang, Gaam and Bowang VDCs on the lekh that is the Rapti-Gandaki divide.

Syaulibang's climate is mostly subtropical below 2,000 metres (6,600 ft) and temperate up to 3,000 metres (10,000 ft) with a small subalpine zone above.

== Villages in this VDC ==
		Ward	Lat.	Lon	Elev.
Banchare	बञ्चरे	5	28°20'N	82°57'E	2,426m
Bansing	बानसिङ	4	28°19'N	82°56'E	2,210
Bansthala	बाँस्थला	5	28°19'N	82°57'E	2,190
Bhegni	Bhigune	5	28°19'N	82°58'E	2,110
Bhungja	भुङजा	2	28°18'N	82°56'E	2,210
Chautara	चौतारा	2	28°17'N	82°56'E	2,010
Chhepte Odar	छेप्टे ओडार	4	28°18'N	82°56'E	2,070
Dakhara	डाखारा	9	28°18'N	82°59'E	2,170
Dharamjim	धरमजिम	3	28°18'N	82°56'E	2,070
Dimechaur	डिमेचौर	5	28°19'N	82°57'E	1,730
Dodrebhir	डोड्रेभिर	4	28°17'N	82°58'E	2,355
Gadera	गडेराkhola	5	28°19'N	82°58'E	2,070
Hastungdanda	हस्तुङडाँडा Ghastung	4	28°19'N	82°55'E	2,530
Jhibang	झिबाङ	3	28°18'N	82°58'E	1,870
Khal	खाल	4	28°19'N	82°56'E	1,950
Khalibang	खालीबाङ	4	28°18'N	82°57'E	1,730
Khardanda	खारडाँडा	8	28°20'N	83°00'E	2,170
Kharkholagaun	खारखोलागाउँ	8	28°18'N	82°58'E	2,030
Kothibhir	कोठीभिर	5,6,7	28°21'N	82°57'E	2,845
Kuser	कुसेर	4	28°19'N	82°56'E	1,875
Langlet	लङलेट	4	28°19'N	82°56'E	2,290
Manggra	माङग्रा	6	28°20'N	82°56'E	2,130
Masing	मसिङ	6	28°20'N	82°57'E	1,950
Mathillo Bhegune	माथिल्लो भेगune	5	28°19'N	82°59'E	2,775
Modhara	मोधारा	6	28°19'N	82°56'E	1,910
Narga	नार्गा	3	28°18'N	82°57'E	1,775
Paharadanda	पहराडाँडा	1	28°18'N	82°58'E	2,230
Ransing	रानसिङ	6	28°21'N	82°57'E	2,412
Sarima	सरिमा	1	28°17'N	82°57'E	1,910
Shahi Bisauna	शाही बिसौना	8	28°17'N	82°59'E	2,245
Syaulibang	स्याउलीबाङ	5	28°19'N	82°57'E	1,706
Tarebhir	तारेभिर	5	28°20'N	82°57'E	2,770
Thoklang	थोकलाङ	5	28°20'N	82°59'E	2,390
Totke	टोट्के	6	28°19'N	82°56'E	2,290
Tumpa	तुम्प	5	28°19'N	82°58'E	2,290
Uttise	उत्तिसे	8	28°19'N	82°58'E	2,123
