= Arkha, Nepal =

Arkha अर्खा
- Village Development Committee
- Location within Nepal
- Coordinates: 28.27°N 83.07°E
- Country: Nepal
- Region: Mid-Western
- Zone: Rapti Zone
- District: Pyuthan District
- VDC: Arkha

Population (2001 Census)
  - Total: 3,331
- 581 households
- Time zone: UTC+5:45 (Nepal Time)

Arkha is a Village Development Committee in Pyuthan, a Middle Hills district of Rapti Zone, western Nepal.

== Villages in VDC ==
		Ward	Lat.	Lon	Elev.
Artubang	अर्टुबाङ	9	28°15'N	83°02'E	1,625m
Banyachaur	बाँयचौर		28°16'N	83°04'E	1,670
Bas	बास		28°17'N	83°04'E	2,058
Besiban	बेसिबन		28°16'N	83°04'E	1,788
Bhande Khoriya	भाँडे खोरिया		28°15'N	83°04'E	2,030
Bhulke	भुल्के		28°15'N	83°05'E	2,199
Damremela	दाम्रेमेला		28°15'N	83°05'E	2,120
Dandagaun	डाँडागाउँ		28°16'N	83°04'E	1,790
Dhungmang	ढुङमाङ		28°16'N	83°05'E	2,031
Galangchhang	गलाङछाङ		28°15'N	83°04'E	1,858
Harji	हर्जी		28°16'N	83°05'E	2,145
Lamadanda	लामाडाँडा		28°16'N	83°03'E	1,540
Lamagaun	लामागाउँ		28°15'N	83°03'E	1,890
Lekhachhar	लेखाछार		28°17'N	83°03'E	2,170
Lujbang	लुजबाङ		28°17'N	83°03'E	1,750
Majuwa	मजुवा		28°16'N	83°03'E	1,470
Mathillo sungure	माथिल्लो सुङ्गुरे		28°17'N	83°05'E	2,270
Painyapata	पैंयापाटा	6	28°16'N	83°04'E	1,670
Patal	पातल		28°15'N	83°03'E	2125
Pokhari Bhitta	पोखरी भिट्टा		28°15'N	83°03'E	1,975
Rangjung	राङजुङ		28°15'N	83°05'E	1,965
Sagbari	सागबारी		28°16'N	83°05'E	1,942
Saura	सौरा		28°16'N	83°03'E	1,530
Sebini	सेबिनी		28°15'N	83°03'E	2,070
Sokhu	सोखु		28°17'N	83°05'E	2,021
Sungure	सुङ्गुरे		28°16'N	83°04'E	1,750
Thatrapatal	थात्रापातल		28°15'N	83°03'E	1,818
Thula Kharka	ठूला खर्क		28°15'N	83°02'E	1,290
Thulo Chaur	ठूलो चौर	1	28°17'N	83°04'E	1,670
