= Pakala, Nepal =

Pakala पकला
- Village Development Committee
- Location in Nepal
- Coordinates: 28.00°N 82.90°E
- Country: Nepal
- Region: Mid-Western
- Zone: Rapti Zone
- District: Pyuthan District
- VDC: Pakala

Population (2001 Census)
  - Total: 3,799
- 719 households
- Time zone: UTC+5:45 (Nepal Time)

Pakala is a town and Village Development Committee in Pyuthan, a Middle Hills district of Rapti Zone, western Nepal.

== Villages in this VDC ==
		Ward	Lat.	Lon	Elev.
Andherigaun	अँधेरीगाउँ	9	28°01'N	82°55'E	810m
Arjam	अर्जाम	8	28°00'N	82°54'E	950
Bel Pokhari	बेल पोखरी		28°01'N	82°55'E	670
Bwase	बवासे		27°59'N	82°53'E	1,050
Darimpata	दारिमपाटा	3	28°00'N	82°53'E	1,350
Gaude	गौडे		27°58'N	82°53'E	1,070
Ghorlikholagaun	घोर्लीखोलागाउँ		28°00'N	82°55'E	868
Hattikhal	हात्तिखाल		27°59'N	82°55'E	1,610
Jabune	जाबुने	5	28°00'N	82°53'E	1,438
Jadi	जाडी		28°02'N	82°54'E	710
Kaule	काउले		27°59'N	82°54'E	1,550
Khara	खारा		27°58'N	82°54'E	450
Khasre	खस्रे		27°58'N	82°53'E	450
Kolbang	कोलबाङ	7	27°59'N	82°53'E	1,150
Lumja	लुम्जा		27°58'N	82°54'E	1,150
Okhari	ओखारी		27°58'N	82°54'E	850
Ronmakhola gaun	रोन्माखोलागाउँ		27°58'N	82°55'E	830
Sadanchaur	सादनचौर		28°01'N	82°54'E	920
Salbas	सालबास		27°59'N	82°53'E	1,190
Thar Damar	थार दमार		27°58'N	82°53'E	550
