= Radio Xpress FM 88.4 MHz =

Radio station in Nepalgunj, Nepal

Radio Xpress FM 88.4 MHz is a licensed commercial radio station in the city of Nepalgunj in Nepal. Radio Xpress is the second commercial radio station in the region and the first ever music radio station in

Nepal's Mid-Western and Far-Western regions.

It broadcasts over the air at 88.4 MHz and on the Internet through its website at http://www.radioxpressfm.com

== Types of music played on RxFm 88.4 MHz ==
- Pop
- Classic rock
- Modern rock
- Rap/ Reggae/ Hip Hop/ Dance
- Nepali pop, rock, modern, film soundtracks, folk, bhajans, classics
- Hindi pop, film soundtracks, Ghazals, Bhajan
- Hindi, Nepali, English Remixes

== List Of Popular Programs ==
- MOC RELOADED
- MUSIC DOT COM
- GOLI SISA KO
- BOLLY BOUNCE
- XPRESS UPDATE (News)
- TIFFIN TIME
- MORNING XPRESS
- MOOD SWING
- AALAP
- ROBO ROCKS
- (SMS= SUNAU MERO SONG)
- GET SET GO
- TAKE ONE
- TRING TRING
- KOLLYWOOD XPRESS
- FILMY COUNTDOWN
- GRIHA BATIKA
- SANIBAR RAMAILO SANIBAR
- KIDS XPRESS
- YO SAJH YO SUBASH
- FRIDAY FIRE
- BACK TO BACK
- SOLO ARTIST
- ONE MOVIE
- NAMASTE NPJ

== Slogan ==
Your Music .. Your Station .
