= Bandikot =

Bandikot बाँदीकोट
- Village Development Committee
- Location within Nepal
- Coordinates: 28.15°N 83.03°E
- Country: Nepal
- Region: Mid-Western
- Zone: Rapti Zone
- District: Pyuthan District
- VDC: Bandikot

Population (2001 Census)
  - Total: 4,426
- 834 households
- Time zone: UTC+5:45 (Nepal Time)
- Postal code: 22300

Bandikot is a town and Village Development Committee in Pyuthan, a Middle Hills district of Rapti Zone, western Nepal. Bandikot also refers to a historic fortress.

== Villages in VDC ==
		Ward	Lat.	Lon	Elev.
Agara	अगारा	5	28°09'N	83°01'E	1,325m
Ahalkholagaun	आहालखोलागाउँ	1	28°10'N	83°00'E	1,155
Badachaur	बडाचौर	8	28°08'N	83°03'E	1,561
Baghmara	बाघमारा	8	28°08'N	83°03'E	1,260
Bakhrikhor	बाख्रिखोर	3	28°09'N	83°00'E	1,415
Baluwa	बालुवा	8	28°08'N	83°03'E	1,290
Bandikot	बाँदीकोट	2	28°09'N	83°00'E	1,639
Baskholagaun	बासखोलागाउँ		28°07'N	83°00'E	1,038
Betane	बेताने	9	28°08'N	83°02'E	1,359
Bhaterchaur	भतेरचौर	4	28°09'N	83°01'E	1,535
Chiphleti	चिफ्लेटी	6	28°09'N	83°02'E	1,610
Dadra	दाद्रा	8	28°08'N	83°03'E	1,355
Dandakharka	डाँडाखर्क	9	28°08'N	83°02'E	1,434
Deurali	देउराली	7	28°09'N	83°02'E	1,795
Dhaireni	धैरेनी		28°08'N	83°00'E	1,442
Dhake Dihi	ढाके डिही	1	28°09'N	83°01'E	1,215
Dhodra	धोद्रा	6	28°09'N	83°02'E	1,565
Dummare	डुम्मारे		28°08'N	83°03'E	1,462
Duwachaur	दुवाचौर	9	28°08'N	83°01'E	1,511
Gaderpani	गडेरपानी	4	28°09'N	83°01'E	1,210
Gatina	गातिना	9	28°07'N	83°01'E	1,110
Halte	हल्ते	1	28°09'N	83°01'E	1,165
Kandapani	काँडापानी	4	28°09'N	83°01'E	1,650
Kansi Pokhara	काँसी पोखरा	5	28°09'N	83°01'E	1,595
Kaule	काउले	6	28°09'N	83°02'E	1,465
Khorpani	खोरपानी	4	28°08'N	83°00'E	1,410
Kotphera	कोटफेरा	2	28°09'N	83°00'E	1,595
Maidan	मैदान	3	28°09'N	83°01'E	1,510
Malya	मल्या		28°10'N	83°02'E	1,650
Mathillo Sihanla	माथिल्लो सिहाँला	1	28°10'N	83°01'E	1,645
Mulapani Chormare	मूलापानी चोरमारे	7	28°10'N	83°02'E	1,782
Pale	पाले		28°08'N	83°04'E	1,692
Silinge	सिलिङ्गे	5	28°09'N	83°01'E	1,522
Simleni	सिम्लेनी	2	28°09'N	83°00'E	1,250
Tallo Sihanla	तल्लो सिहाँला	1	28°10'N	83°01'E	1,450
Thapchaur	थापचौर	5	28°09'N	83°01'E	1,290
Timurkharka	टिमुरखर्क		28°08'N	83°03'E	1,505
