= Jumrikanda =

Jumrikanda जुमृकाँडा
- Village Development Committee
- Location in Nepal
- Coordinates: 28.17°N 82.82°E
- Country: Nepal
- Region: Mid-Western
- Zone: Rapti Zone
- District: Pyuthan District
- VDC: Jumrikanda

Population (2001 Census)
  - Total: 3,023
- 625 households
- Time zone: UTC+5:45 (Nepal Time)

Jumrikanda is a town and Village Development Committee in Pyuthan, a Middle Hills district of Rapti Zone, western Nepal.

== Villages in VDC ==
		Ward	Lat.	Lon	Elev.
Arudanda	अरुडाँडा		28°10'N	82°50'E	1,470m
Bahungaun	बाहुनगाउँ		28°10'N	82°49'E	1,744
Bantakura	बनटाकुरा		28°10'N	82°50'E	1,470
Baskot	बासकोट		28°09'N	82°49'E	1,290
Bhalubhutte	भालुभुत्ते		28°10'N	82°50'E	1,655
Bismure	बिसमुरे		28°11'N	82°48'E	1,931
Danphe	डाँफे		28°09'N	82°49'E	1,270
Domai	दोमै		28°09'N	82°50'E	1,022
Jhankrigaun	झाँक्रीगाउँ		28°09'N	82°48'E	1,415
Jumrikanda	जुम्रीकाँडा		28°10'N	82°49'E	1,693
Kutdanda	कुटडाँडा		28°10'N	82°50'E	1,430
Nepane	नेपाने		28°09'N	82°48'E	1,866
Obang	ओबाङ	6	28°10'N	82°48'E	1,459
Odarni	ओडार्नी		28°10'N	82°50'E	1,490
Odrahalnegaun	ओड्राहाल्नेगाउँ		28°10'N	82°50'E	1,730
Pakute	पाकुटे		28°10'N	82°49'E	1,530
Patal Kateri	पातल कटेरी		28°11'N	82°48'E	1,818
Purnagaun	पुर्नागाउँ	8	28°10'N	82°48'E	1,590
Sarga	सर्गा		28°11'N	82°49'E	1,905
Sirbang	सिरबाङ		28°09'N	82°50'E	1,190
Sugurkhal	सुँगुरखाल		28°09'N	82°48'E	1,765
Takura	टाकुरा		28°09'N	82°49'E	1,375
Tallo Thakana	तल्लो थकना		28°10'N	82°50'E	1,495
Tarakholagaun	ताराखोलागाउँ		28°09'N	82°49'E	1,265
