= Phopli =

Phopli फोप्ली
- Village Development Committee
- Location in Nepal
- Coordinates: 28.20°N 82.86°E
- Country: Nepal
- Region: Mid-Western
- Zone: Rapti Zone
- District: Pyuthan District
- VDC: Phopli

Population (2001 Census)
  - Total: 5,050
- 1,014 households
- Time zone: UTC+5:45 (Nepal Time)

Phopli is a town and Village Development Committee within Pyuthan, Rapti Zone, Nepal.

== Villages in this VDC ==
		Ward	Lat.	Lon	Elev.
Andheri	अँधेरी	1	28°11'N	82°53'E	958m
Banskot	बाँसकोट	7	28°12'N	82°53'E	1,310
Bhaune	भौने	4	28°11'N	82°51'E	2,030
Chor Kateri	चोर कटेरी		28°12'N	82°51'E	1,770
Damai Tol	दमाई टोल		28°12'N	82°54'E	1,345
Dwarkholagaun	द्वारखोलागाउँ	1	28°10'N	82°53'E	942
Gatina	गातिना	5	28°11'N	82°52'E	1,330
Ghobange	घोबाङ्गे	7	28°12'N	82°52'E	1,648
Goganpani	गोगनपानी	9	28°13'N	82°50'E	1,710
Karange	करङ्गे	7	28°13'N	82°51'E	1,905
Khairapur	खैरापुर	3	28°11'N	82°52'E	1,610
Khamaribas	खामरीबास	9	28°12'N	82°50'E	2,015
Luplung	लुपलुङ	2	28°10'N	82°52'E	1,690
Mairamare	मैरामारे	9	28°12'N	82°50'E	1,841
Marke	मार्के	6	28°11'N	82°53'E	965
Patchaur	पातचौर	7	28°13'N	82°51'E	2,005
Paule	पौले	3	28°12'N	82°51'E	1,639
Phopli	फोप्ली	6	28°11'N	82°52'E	1,770
Pokhara	पोखरा	7	28°12'N	82°51'E	1,771
Purnagaun	पूर्णगाउँ	3	28°11'N	82°51'E	1,850
Sallamare	सल्लामारे		28°12'N	82°52'E	1,490
Surdip	सुरदिप	9	28°13'N	82°50'E	1,850
Syaule	स्याउले	8	28°13'N	82°50'E	1,930
Timale	टिमले		28°12'N	82°52'E	1,375
