= Khabang =

Khabang खबाङ
- Village Development Committee
- Location in Nepal
- Coordinates: 28.24°N 82.95°E
- Country: Nepal
- Region: Mid-Western
- Zone: Rapti Zone
- District: Pyuthan District
- VDC: Khabang

Population (2001 Census)
  - Total: 4,217
- 769 households
- Time zone: UTC+5:45 (Nepal Time)

Khabang is a town and Village Development Committee in Pyuthan, a Middle Hills district of Rapti Zone, western Nepal.

== Villages in VDC ==
		Ward	Lat.	Lon	Elev.
Bayapakha	बयपाखा		28°13'N	82°56'E	1,502m
Chisapani	चिसापानी		28°13'N	82°57'E	1,990
Dhamche	धाम्चे		28°15'N	82°56'E	1,410
Ekrate	एकराते	7	28°14'N	82°57'E	1,950
Ghagu	घागु		28°15'N	82°58'E	1,790
Ghogalne	घोगाल्ने		28°14'N	82°57'E	1,830
Jhimp	झिम्प	5	28°14'N	82°56'E	1,564
Jhungdi	झुङडी	2	28°12'N	82°56'E	1,910
Kainyagaun	काँइयागाउँ	9	28°15'N	82°56'E	1,530
Kanaghare	कानाघरे		28°13'N	82°57'E	1,815
Kaphalbutta	काफलबुट्टा		28°17'N	82°57'E	2,110
Khabang	खबाङ	4	28°13'N	82°56'E	1,530
Khalabang	खलाबाङ		28°13'N	82°57'E	1,490
Kot	कोट		28°14'N	82°56'E	1,325
Kukarchen	कुकरचेन		28°16'N	82°57'E	2,050
Lihi	लिही		28°14'N	82°56'E	1,450
Lingbang	लिङबाङ		28°15'N	82°56'E	1,330
Masara	मसरा		28°14'N	82°56'E	1,295
Naban	नबन		28°14'N	82°58'E	1,975
Okhaldhunga	ओखलढुङ्गा		28°15'N	82°57'E	1,750
Phant	फाँट		28°14'N	82°57'E	1,585
Putlibang	पुत्लीबाङ		28°14'N	82°56'E	1,270
Ratamata	रातामाटा		28°13'N	82°56'E	1,738
Rotepani	रोटेपानी		28°13'N	82°56'E	1,478
Rujim	रुजिम		28°14'N	82°58'E	1,905
Rumbang	रुमबाङ		28°15'N	82°56'E	1,535
Sutlaban	सुत्लाबाङ		28°14'N	82°57'E	1,550
Thulaban	ठूलाबन		28°15'N	82°56'E	1,715
Thulasiu	ठूलासिउ		28°13'N	82°57'E	1,670
Balipuk	बालिपुक		28°13'N	82°55'E	1,210
