= Ramdi =

Rangdi rangdi
- Village Development Committee
- Location in Nepal
- Coordinates: 28.05°N 82.81°E
- Country: Nepal
- Region: Mid-Western
- Zone: Rapti Zone
- District: Pyuthan District
- VDC: Ramdi

Population (2001 Census)
  - Total: 2,388
- 481 households
- Time zone: UTC+5:45 (Nepal Time)

Ramdi is a village and Village Development Committee in Pyuthan, a Middle Hills district of Rapti Zone, western Nepal.

== Villages in this VDC ==
		Ward	Lat.	Lon	Elev.
Anpchaur	आँपचौर		28°04'N	82°50'E	750m
Ardus	अर्दुस		28°04'N	82°48'E	550
Bayodanda	बयोडाँडा		28°03'N	82°48'E	1,119
Chakchake	चकचके	7	28°03'N	82°48'E	590
China	चिन		28°03'N	82°49'E	1,330
Chorpani	चोरपानी		28°03'N	82°48'E	1,022
Dungdunge	डुङडुङे		28°03'N	82°49'E	1,150
Ekchote	एकचोटे		28°02'N	82°47'E	538
Jujineta	जुजीनेटा	5	28°04'N	82°49'E	930
Kalikholagaun	कालीखोलागाउँ		28°01'N	82°48'E	530
Kitghat	किटघाट		28°04'N	82°48'E	550
Kot Thumka	कोट थुम्का		28°01'N	82°49'E	1,522
Ramdi	रम्दी	3	28°03'N	82°49'E	1,165
Ramdibesi	रम्दीबेसी		28°04'N	82°49'E	750
Sikhre	सिख्रे		28°02'N	82°49'E	1,358
Sirbari	सिरबारी		28°02'N	82°48'E	1,135
Tigra	तिग्रा	1	28°02'N	82°50'E	750
