= Majhakot, Rapti =

Majhakot माझकोट
- Village Development Committee
- Location in Nepal
- Coordinates: 28.13°N 82.87°E
- Country: Nepal
- Region: Mid-Western
- Zone: Rapti Zone
- District: Pyuthan District
- VDC: Majhakot

Population (2001 Census)
  - Total: 2,357
- 476 households
- Time zone: UTC+5:45 (Nepal Time)

Majhakot is a village and Village Development Committee in Pyuthan, a Middle Hills district of Rapti Zone, western Nepal.

== Etymology ==
majha (Nepali: माझ) - middle, center.
kot (Nepali: कोट)- guardroom, prison, police station.

== Villages in this VDC ==
		Ward	Lat.	Lon	Elev.
Ampdhara	आँपधारा		28°09'N	82°50'E	1,195m
Bahundanda	बाहुनडाँडा		28°08'N	82°52'E	1,170
Dandagaun	डाँडागाउँ		28°08'N	82°51'E	1,670
Deurali Bhitta	देउराली भित्ता		28°09'N	82°50'E	1,365
Dhae	धाए		28°10'N	82°52'E	1,630
Dhanchaur	धनचौर		28°09'N	82°52'E	1,170
Dhungethanti	ढुङ्गेठाँटी		28°09'N	82°50'E	1,025
Gurunggaun	गुरुङगाउँ	1	28°08'N	82°52'E	1,494
Jumlidhara	जुम्लीधारा		28°10'N	82°51'E	1,730
Karange	करङ्गे		28°09'N	82°51'E	1,515
Kholigaun	खोलीगाउँ	6	28°09'N	82°52'E	1,618
Kot	कोट		28°08'N	82°51'E	1,665
Lamkshyang Neta	लमक्ष्याङ नेटा	4	28°09'N	82°51'E	1,650
Majhakot	माझकोट		28°08'N	82°52'E	1,545
Nepane	नेपाने		28°09'N	82°50'E	1,577
Painyapani	पैंयापानी		28°09'N	82°51'E	1,721
