= Dhobaghat =

Dhobaghat (Udayapurkot) धोबाघाट (उदयपुरकोट)
- Village Development Committee
- Location in Nepal
- Coordinates: 28.07°N 82.85°E
- Country: Nepal
- Region: Mid-Western
- Zone: Rapti Zone
- District: Pyuthan District
- VDC: Dhobaghat (Udayapurkot)

Population (2001 Census)
  - Total: 2,157
- 396 households
- Time zone: UTC+5:45 (Nepal Time)

Dhobaghat -- also called Udayapurkot --- is a village and Village Development Committee in Pyuthan, a Middle Hills district of Rapti Zone, western Nepal.

== Etymology ==
dhoba (Nepali: धोबा) - washing clothing.
ghat (Nepali: घाट) - shore or bank of a river; stone platform or steps on a river bank
Thus: place by river for washing clothes.

udaya (Nepali: उदय)- rising, ascent, dawning.
pur (Nepali: पुर)- town or city.
kot (Nepali: कोट)- guardroom, prison, police station.
Thus: Dawn city police post

== Villages in VDC ==
		Ward	Lat.	Lon	Elev.
Anpchaur	आँपचौर		28°03'N	82°43'E	690m
Banera Khajuri	बनेरा खजुरी		28°04'N	82°44'E	1,515
Bhanyerchaur	भँयेरचौर		28°03'N	82°41'E	781
Bhedabari	भेडाबारी		28°04'N	82°45'E	1,250
Burdi	बुर्दी		28°02'N	82°44'E	630
Charpani	चारपानी		28°04'N	82°42'E	1,310
Dhobaghat	धोबाघाट	3	28°04'N	82°44'E	1,250
Gorule	गोरुले		28°03'N	82°43'E	639
Mas Pokhari	मास पोखरी	28°03'N	82°44'E	1,470	
Mukhchaur	मुखचौर	6	28°03'N	82°42'E	710
Rithekholagaun	रिठेखोलागाउँ		28°04'N	82°42'E	1,470
Salli Kharka	सल्ली खर्क	8	28°05'N	82°45'E	1,315
Sirbari	सिरबारी		28°05'N	82°44'E	1,478
Udaypurkot	उदयपुरकोट	9	28°03'N	82°45'E	1,430
