= Tusara =

Tuzara तुषारा
- Village Development Committee
- Location in Nepal
- Coordinates: 28.16°N 82.95°E
- Country: Nepal
- Region: Mid-Western
- Zone: Rapti Zone
- District: Pyuthan District
- VDC: Tusara

Population (2001 Census)
  - Total: 4,584
- 896 households
- Time zone: UTC+5:45 (Nepal Time)

Tusara is a town and Village Development Committee in Pyuthan, a Middle Hills district of Rapti Zone, western Nepal.

== Villages in this Gaunpalika ==
		Ward	Lat.	Lon	Elev.
Batule	बाटुले		28°09'N	82°57'E	950m
Belghari	बेलघारी		28°09'N	82°56'E	885
Chhatipata	छातिपाटा		28°09'N	82°57'E	925
Gabdi	गब्दी		28°10'N	82°58'E	1,230
Hiddanda	हिडडाँडा	7	28°10'N	82°56'E	1,450
Kaprekholagaun	काप्रेखोला	8	28°09'N	82°58'E	1,225
Kitghat	किटघाट		28°09'N	82°55'E	870
TusaraKot	तुषाराकोट		28°10'N	82°56'E	1,670
Kuta	कुता		28°10'N	82°56'E	1,505
Kutakholagaun	कुताखोलागाउँ		28°09'N	82°56'E	1,090
Pidalne	पिडाल्ने		28°09'N	82°58'E	955
Ratamata	रातामाटा		28°10'N	82°58'E	1,175
Rattari	राटटारी		28°08'N	82°56'E	905
Simalchaur	सिमलचौर		28°09'N	82°56'E	915
Simpani	सिमपानी		28°09'N	82°57'E	1,470
Tusara	तुषारा		28°10'N	82°57'E	1,550
Upallo Kot	उपल्लो कोट		28°11'N	82°56'E	1,710
