= Hansapur, Rapti =

Hansapur हंसपुर
- Village Development Committee
- Location in Nepal
- Coordinates: 27.93°N 82.90°E
- Country: Nepal
- Region: Mid-Western
- Zone: Rapti Zone
- District: Pyuthan District
- VDC: Hansapur

Population (2001 Census)
  - Total: 3,008
- 495 households
- Time zone: UTC+5:45 (Nepal Time)

Hansapur is a Village Development Committee in Pyuthan, a Middle Hills district of Rapti Zone, western Nepal. The village lies to the northeast of the district sharing its border mainly to Aargakhanchi. The area is mostly inhabited by Brahmins and other castes, too. The village or VDC is a developing area in the district with proper facilities of electricity and communication. The place is well established for ginger (Aduwa) and bee honey (Maha; local).

== Etymology ==
hamsa (Nepali: हंस) - soul, spirit, heart
pur (Nepali: पुर)- town or city.
Thus: town of souls

== Villages in VDC ==
Village|	Ward	Lat.	Lon	Elev.	
Baguwa	बगुवा	1	27°55'N	82°55'E	430m
Baike	बैके	9	27°58'N	82°50'E	510
Bange	बाङगे	6	27°58'N	82°52'E	670
Bangge	बाङगे	6	27°58'N	82°53'E	430
Beore	बेवरे	7	27°58'N	82°51'E	610
Chabha	चाभा	6	27°57'N	82°52'E	890
Dhab	ढाब	7	27°57'N	82°51'E	910
Dumai	दुमै	1	27°56'N	82°56'E	550
Dhuwakot	दुवाकोट	8	27°57'N	82°51'E	990
Ghorlate	घोर्लटे	5	27°57'N	82°54'E	690
Gotheri	गोठेरी	4	27°56'N	82°54'E	810
Gurungdanda	गुरुङडाँडा	8	27°57'N	82°51'E	1,043
Hansapur	हंसपुर	1	27°56'N	82°54'E	810
Jabune	जाबुने	1	27°55'N	82°55'E	410
Kaskot	कासकोट	6	27°57'N	82°53'E	930
Khewarepani	केवरेपानी	9	27°58'N	82°50'E	870
Machhedi	मछेडी	1	27°57'N	82°55'E	410
Odale	ओदाले	5	27°58'N	82°53'E	490
Okhardanda	ओखरडाँडा	9	27°57'N	82°51'E	870
Panaha	पनाहा	7	27°58'N	82°52'E	430
Sajekot	सजेकोट	4	27°57'N	82°53'E	950
Sujinpur	सुजनपुर	5	27°57'N	82°53'E	690
Udin dhungga	उदिन ढुङगा	8	27°57'N	82°52'E	950
