= Chunja, Rapti =

Village Development Committee in Nepal

Chunja चुँजा
- Village Development Committee
- Location in Nepal
- Coordinates: 28.08°N 82.96°E
- Country: Nepal
- Region: Mid-Western
- Zone: Rapti Zone
- District: Pyuthan District
- VDC: Chunja

Population (2001 Census)
  - Total: 4,526
- 855 households
- Time zone: UTC+5:45 (Nepal Time)

Chunja is a town and Village Development Committee in Pyuthan, a Middle Hills district of Rapti Zone, western Nepal.

== Villages in VDC ==
		Ward	Lat.	Lon	Elev.							
Arauti	अरौटी	2	28°05'N	82°57'E	1,290							
Arbang	अर्बाङ	1	28°05'N	82°57'E	1,470							
Barthum	बारथुम	2	28°06'N	82°57'E	1,330							
Bhainsamare	भैंसामारे	6	28°04'N	82°58'E	1,018							
Birauta	बिरौटा	5	28°04'N	82°58'E	950							
Chaduli	चदुली		28°06'N	82°58'E	1,925							
Chiuriya Bagar	चिउरिया बगर	5	28°04'N	82°58'E	1,050							
Chunja	चुँजा	8 / 9	28°04'N	82°57'E	1,410							
Chujakharka	चुँजाखर्क	6	28°04'N	82°58'E	1,110	Chitredanda	Darimkharka	दारिमखर्क		28°05'N	82°56'E	1,410
Dharedhunga	धरेढुङ्गा		28°06'N	82°58'E	1,418							
Gaira	गैरा	6	28°06'N	82°59'E	1,690							
Harthunga	हर्थुङ्गा		28°06'N	82°58'E	1,732							
Khaniyokhola gaun	खनियोखोलागाउँ	8	28°04'N	82°57'E	1,008							
Kharindanda	खरिनडाँडा	7	28°03'N	82°57'E	1,050							
Khoriyabari	खोरियाबारी		28°06'N	82°59'E	1,650							
Lukka	लुक्का	3	28°06'N	83°00'E	1,680							
Madukare	मदुकरे	8	28°03'N	82°57'E	930							
Majhpani	माझपानी		28°06'N	82°59'E	1,935							
Marung	मरुङ	5	28°05'N	82°58'E	1,035							
Paderakhola gaun	पदेराखोलागाउँ		28°04'N	82°57'E	1,130							
Padime	पदिमे		28°06'N	82°59'E	1,710							
Rajme	राज्मे		28°03'N	82°58'E	1,225							
Salhanna	सलहान्ना		28°06'N	82°59'E	1,818							
Salithum	सालिथुम		28°06'N	82°59'E	1,635							
Sindure	सिँदुरे		28°06'N	82°58'E	1,912							
Siute	सिउते	6	28°04'N	82°58'E	1,259							
Syani Lekh	स्यानी लेख	1	28°05'N	82°56'E	1,636							
Tham	थाम		28°05'N	82°59'E	1,590							
Thulachaur	ठूलाचौर		28°06'N	83°00'E	1,910							
Todke	टोड्के		28°06'N	82°58'E	1,910	Upallo Rajime	उपल्लो राजिमे		28°04'N	82°58'E	1,496	
