= Ligha =

Village Development Committee in Mid-Western, Nepal

Ligha लिघा Lipa लिपा
- Village Development Committee
- Location in Nepal
- Coordinates: 28.27°N 82.91°E
- Country: Nepal
- Region: Mid-Western
- Zone: Rapti Zone
- District: Pyuthan District
- VDC: Ligha

Population (2001 Census)
  - Total: 2,421
- 443 households
- Time zone: UTC+5:45 (Nepal Time)

Ligha also known as Lipa is a village and Village Development Committee in Pyuthan, a Middle Hills district of Rapti Zone, western Nepal.

== Villages in this VDC ==
		Ward	Lat.	Lon	Elev.
Budhi Pokhara	बुढी पोखरा		28°15'N	82°54'E	1,710
Chormol	चोरमोल		28°14'N	82°55'E	1,370
Danda Kateri	डाँडा कटेरी	8	28°15'N	82°54'E	1,830
Dar Bisauna	दर बिसौना		28°15'N	82°55'E	1,370
Dihi	डिही		28°14'N	82°54'E	1,325
Dingbungdanda	डिङबुङडाँडा		28°17'N	82°54'E	2,470
Dobata	दोबाटा		28°14'N	82°54'E	1,670
Kurtibang	कुर्तीबाङ	1	28°17'N	82°55'E	1,610
Kurtibhir	कुर्ती भिर		28°18'N	82°55'E	2,522
Ligha	लिघा		28°15'N	82°55'E	1,590
Majhbhir	माझभिर		28°16'N	82°54'E	2,050
Patauti	पटौटी		28°14'N	82°54'E	1,630
Phaune Pokhari	फाउने पोखरी		28°16'N	82°55'E	1,910
Pinara	पिनारा		28°14'N	82°55'E	1,590
Shirbang	शिरबाङ	4	28°16'N	82°55'E	1,590
Silkhan	सिलखन		28°16'N	82°56'E	1,610
Sirbidhara	सिर्बिघारा		28°17'N	82°56'E	1,815
Sirnechaur	सिर्नेचौर		28°17'N	82°55'E	1,742
Thantihalna	ठाँटीहाल्ना		28°15'N	82°54'E	1,730
