= Rajwara =

Rajwara रजवारा
- Village Development Committee
- Location in Nepal
- Coordinates: 28.29°N 83.01°E
- Country: Nepal
- Region: Mid-Western
- Zone: Rapti Zone
- District: Pyuthan District
- VDC: Rajwara

Population (2001 Census)
  - Total: 3,537
- 623 households
- Time zone: UTC+5:45 (Nepal Time)

Rajwara is a town and Village Development Committee in Pyuthan, a Middle Hills district of Rapti Zone, western Nepal.

== Villages in this VDC ==
| | | Ward | Lat. | Lon | Elev. |
|---|---|---|---|---|---|
| Alubari | आलुबारी | | 28°17'N | 83°00'E | 2,192m |
| Bhangeri | भँगेरी | | 28°15'N | 83°01'E | 1,642 |
| Chanchala | चाँचला | | 28°17'N | 83°02'E | 1,788 |
| Daha | दह | | 28°17'N | 83°00'E | 1,930 |
| Dangbang | डाङबाङ | 9 | 28°17'N | 83°01'E | 1,690 |
| Dhanda | ढाँडा | | 28°15'N | 83°01'E | 1,770 |
| Dhwankatir | ध्वाकटिर | | 28°17'N | 83°00'E | 1,890 |
| Dihi | डिही | | 28°17'N | 83°02'E | 1,622 |
| Jaita Kharka | जैतखर्क | | 28°18'N | 83°00'E | 2,230 |
| Kabrabang | काब्राबाङ | | 28°17'N | 83°01'E | 1,790 |
| Khalang | खलाङ | | 28°19'N | 83°01'E | 2,318 |
| Khara | खरा | 8 | 28°16'N | 83°02'E | 1,910 |
| Kholakot | खोलाकोट | | 28°18'N | 83°01'E | 2,290 |
| Korban | कोरबन | | 28°14'N | 83°01'E | 1,410 |
| LamiBagar | लामिबगर | | 28°16'N | 83°00'E | 2,138 |
| Lankuree | लाँकुरी | | 28°16'N | 83°01'E | 1,790 |
| Minrabang | मिन्द्रबाङ | | 28°17'N | 83°01'E | 1,770 |
| Neta | नेटा | 3 | 28°16'N | 83°02'E | 1,781 |
| Pharkatri | फार्कट्री | | 28°15'N | 83°02'E | 1,558 |
| Pokhara | पोखरा | 7 | 28°16'N | 83°01'E | 2,094 |
| Rajawara | रजवारा | 1 गहिराबारी | 28°16'N | 83°02'E | 1,690 |
| Rongkarok | रोङकारोक | | 28°18'N | 83°00'E | 2,115 |
| Sandhikharka Hile | सन्धिखर्क हिले ???? | | 28°14'N | 83°00'E | 1,890 |
| Sirungkholagaun | सिरुङखोलागाउँ | | 28°15'N | 83°02'E | 1,270 |
