= Bangemarkot =

Bangemrot बाङ्गेमरोट
- Village Development Committee
- Location within Nepal
- Coordinates: 28.12°N 83.00°E
- Country: Nepal
- Region: Mid-Western
- Zone: Rapti Zone
- District: Pyuthan District
- VDC: Bangemarot

Population (2001 Census)
  - Total: 3,579
- 684 households
- Time zone: UTC+5:45 (Nepal Time)

Bangemarot is a Village Development Committee in Pyuthan, a Middle Hills district of Rapti Zone, western Nepal.

== Villages in VDC ==
		Ward	Lat.	Lon	Elev.
Alkabajh	अल्काबाझ		28°06'N	83°00'E	1,405m
Ambot	आमबोट		28°07'N	82°59'E	1,130
Bajhbange	बाझबाङ्गे		28°07'N	83°00'E	1,320
Bange	बाङ्गे	2	28°07'N	83°00'E	1,464
Bangephedi	बाङ्गेफेदी	4	28°07'N	83°00'E	1,270
Baunda	बौंडा	5	28°07'N	83°01'E	1,630
Biddanda	बिदडाँडा	6	28°06'N	83°02'E	1,590
Chaur	चौर		28°07'N	82°59'E	1,190
Dorlote	दोर्लोटे		28°07'N	83°01'E	1,410
Golkhanda	गोलखाँडा		28°07'N	82°59'E	1,050
Harre	हर्रे		28°07'N	83°00'E	1,210
Kauchhe	कौछे		28°07'N	82°59'E	1,190
Kauchhe Khanda	कौछे खण्ड		28°06'N	82°59'E	1,485
Kharipate	खरीपाटा		28°08'N	83°03'E	1,350
Kopilpata	कोपिलपाटा		28°07'N	83°01'E	1,130
Phursedhara	फुर्सेधारा		28°06'N	83°03'E	1,690
Pokhari	पोखारी		28°07'N	83°02'E	1,350
Pokharidandagaun	पोखरीडाँडागाउँ	6	28°07'N	83°02'E	1,310
Sadanthuta	सादनठुटा		28°07'N	83°01'E	1,270
Sautamare	सौतामारे	8	28°07'N	83°03'E	1,710
Sautamare Phedi	सौतामारे फेदी	6	28°07'N	83°02'E	1,170
Sautamare Tallagaun	सौतामारे तल्लागाउँ		28°07'N	83°03'E	1,430
Tallakharka	तल्लाखर्क		28°07'N	83°02'E	1,610
Todke	टोड्के		28°06'N	83°00'E	1,732
