= Bijuli =

Village Development Committee in Mid-Western, Nepal

Bijuli बिजुली
- Village Development Committee
- Location in Nepal
- Coordinates: 28.03°N 82.95°E
- Country: Nepal
- Region: Mid-Western
- Zone: Rapti Zone
- District: Pyuthan District
- VDC: Bijuli

Population (2001 Census)
  - Total: 3,666
- 697 households
- Time zone: UTC+5:45 (Nepal Time)

Bijuli is a town and Village Development Committee in Pyuthan, a Middle Hills district of Rapti Zone, western Nepal.

== Etymology ==
Bijuli means lightning or electricity.

== Villages in VDC ==
		Ward	Lat.	Lon	Elev.
Aitar	ऐटार		28°00'N	82°57'E	630m
Arlabang	अर्लबाङ		28°01'N	82°57'E	630
Baghkhor	बाघखोर		28°02'N	82°57'E	1,150
Bahunthok	बाहुनथोक		28°02'N	82°57'E	1,255
Baireni	बैरेनी	6	28°00'N	82°57'E	670
Baram Pokhara	बरम पोखरा		28°01'N	82°58'E	1,135
Barthan	बरथान		28°01'N	82°57'E	1,352
Basdanda	बासडाँडा	1	28°03'N	82°56'E	1,110
Batule	बाटुले		28°02'N	82°58'E	835
Bijuli	बिजुली		28°02'N	82°57'E	1,212
Chidiyapakha	चिडियापाखा		28°01'N	82°58'E	973
Chiurapani	चिउरापानी	3	28°02'N	82°57'E	1,210
Damar	दमार		28°00'N	82°57'E	765
Dhairechaur	धैरेचौर		28°02'N	82°58'E	1,010
Dhanphule	धनफूले		28°02'N	82°56'E	1,130
Gahatera	गहतेरा		28°00'N	82°58'E	670
Hattipaila	हात्तिपाइला	9	28°02'N	82°58'E	1,038
Kanle	कान्ले		28°03'N	82°57'E	920
Ladam	लादम		28°01'N	82°57'E	650
Madahi	मडाही		28°01'N	82°57'E	1,135
Mahindra Dip	महिन्द्रा दिप		28°02'N	82°58'E	794
Okhaldhunga	ओखलढुङ्गा		28°02'N	82°58'E	1,109
Rahakholagaun	रहखोलागाउँ		28°01'N	82°58'E	685
Simethum	सिमेथुम		28°01'N	82°58'E	1,279
Sineta	सिनेटा		28°00'N	82°58'E	901
Syani Tham	स्यानी थाम		28°02'N	82°56'E	798
Tham	थाम		28°02'N	82°57'E	1,182
Udik	उदिक	5	28°01'N	82°56'E	645
