= Liwang =

Liwang may refer to:

- Liwang, Mechi, Nepal
- Liwang, Pyuthan, Nepal
- Liwang, Rolpa, Nepal
