= Tiram =

Town and Village Development Committee in Nepal

Mandabi Gaupalika 1 तिराम Dhurunga
- Village Development Committee
- Location in Nepal
- Coordinates: 28.02°N 82.77°E
- Country: Nepal
- Region: Mid-Western
- Zone: Rapti Zone
- District: Pyuthan District
- VDC: Tiram
- Wards: 1

Population (2001 Census)
  - Total: 4,926
- 827 households
- Time zone: UTC+5:45 (Nepal Time)

Tiram is a town and Village Development Committee in Pyuthan, a Middle Hills district of Rapti Zone, western Nepal.

Tiram is a hill town surrounded by terraced rice fields with a mostly Bahun and Chhetri population. It is the home of a politically prominent family named Upadhyaya. Tiram is situated on a spur of the Mahabharat Range overlooking Mardi Khola, the largest tributary of the Rapti.

A motorable gravel road from Tribhuwannagar, Dang Deokhuri District passes through the town and descends toward a junction along Mardi Khola with a more important spur road linking the administrative centers of Pyuthan and Rolpa districts to the main east-west Mahendra Highway.

== Villages in this VDC ==
		Ward	Lat.	Lon	Elev.
Amdanda	आमडाँडा		28°02'N	82°45'E	810m
Amghat	आमघाट		28°01'N	82°48'E	580
Arkhale	अर्खले		27°58'N	82°46'E	1,230
Bade Chaur	बडे चौर		28°02'N	82°45'E	690
Bhingrikholagaun	भिङग्रीखोलागाउँ	5	27°59'N	82°48'E	870
Bhirkuna	भिरकुना		27°59'N	82°48'E	910
Budhichaur	बुढीचौर	6	27°59'N	82°47'E	1,136
Dhaire Khapte	धैरे ख्ण्टे		27°58'N	82°46'E	1,450
Ghyakhore	घ्याखोरे		27°59'N	82°49'E	730
Goddhara	गोद्धारा		27°59'N	82°46'E	1,350
Kateni Chheda	कटेनी छेडा		27°59'N	82°47'E	1,530
Kharibang	खरीबाङ		28°00'N	82°46'E	990
Kimchaur	किमचौर	7	28°01'N	82°45'E	1,198
Kumaltar	कुमालटार	3	28°02'N	82°47'E	570
Mutaha	मुताहा		28°00'N	82°49'E	615
Nigreli	निग्रेली		27°59'N	82°45'E	1,410
Pangbang	पाङबाङ	8	28°00'N	82°45'E	990
Pangkot	पाङकोट	9	27°59'N	82°45'E	570
Rajje	रज्जे		27°59'N	82°45'E	1,130
Siddhathan	सिद्धथान		27°58'N	82°47'E	1,690
Simalchaur	सिमलचौर		28°01'N	82°47'E	605
Simle	सिम्ले		27°59'N	82°47'E	1,430
Takura	टाकुरा		27°59'N	82°48'E	1,310
Thadi Odar	ठाडी ओडार		28°00'N	82°49'E	650
Thakeleni	थक्लेनी	4	28°01'N	82°48'E	879
Timile	टिमिले		28°02'N	82°46'E	585
Tiram	तिराम	1	28°01'N	82°46'E	1,225
