= Narikot =

Narikot नारीकोट
- Village Development Committee
- Location in Nepal
- Coordinates: 28.19°N 83.00°E
- Country: Nepal
- Region: Mid-Western
- Province: Lumbini Province
- District: Pyuthan District
- VDC: Narikot

Population (2001 Census)
  - Total: 2,566
- 502 households
- Time zone: UTC+5:45 (Nepal Time)

Narikot is a town and Village Development Committee in Pyuthan, a Middle Hills district of Lumbini Province, western Nepal.

== Villages in this VDC ==
		Ward	Lat.	Lon	Elev.
Asurbari	असुरबारी		28°11'N 83°01'E 1,710m		
Bhatepani	भाटेपानी		28°10'N 83°01'E 1,670		
Bisauna	बिसौना		28°10'N 83°01'E 1,730		
Dandagaun	डाँडागाउँ		28°11'N 83°00'E 1,355		
Dharampani	धरमपानी		28°11'N 82°59'E 1,350		
Kaphalpata	काफलपाटा		28°11'N 83°00'E 1,565		
Khirepata	खिरेपाटा		28°11'N 83°00'E 1,510		
Lammela	लाम्मेला		28°11'N 83°01'E 1,415		
Madkena	मड्केना		28°11'N 83°01'E 1,530		
Narikot	नारीकोट		28°11'N 83°00'E 1,565		
Patihalna	पातीहाल्ना		28°12'N 82°59'E 1,225		
Ramkhola	रामखोला		28°11'N 82°59'E 1,230		
Ratamata	रातामाटा	1	28°11'N 82°59'E 1,110		
Thula Bisauna	ठूला बिसौना	2	28°12'N 82°59'E 1,330		
