= Damri, Nepal =

Damri डाम्री
- Village Development Committee
- Location in Nepal
- Coordinates: 28.24°N 82.87°E
- Country: Nepal
- Region: Mid-Western
- Zone: Rapti Zone
- District: Pyuthan District
- VDC: Damri

Population (2001 Census)
  - Total: 3,629
- 681 households
- Time zone: UTC+5:45 (Nepal Time)

Damri is a town and Village Development Committee in Pyuthan, a Middle Hills district of Rapti Zone, western Nepal.

== Villages in VDC ==
		Ward	Lat.	Lon	
Barebang	बरेबाङ		28°14'N	82°53'E	1,770m
Basai	बसै		28°15'N	82°52'E	1,910
Bhalang	भलाङ		28°14'N	82°52'E	1,870
Damri	डाम्री		28°15'N	82°53'E	1,810
Dangdul	डाङडुल		28°15'N	82°53'E	1,770
Dihi	डिही		28°14'N	82°53'E	1,498
Gaibang	गाइबाङ		28°13'N	82°55'E	1,435
Galdung	गल्डुङ		28°14'N	82°52'E	1,650
Gawai	गावै	8	28°13'N	82°54'E	1,492
Jhulechaur	झूलेचौर		28°16'N	82°53'E	2,160
Kadhe	काढे		28°14'N	82°51'E	2,090
Kante	काँटे		28°15'N	82°53'E	1,805
Kantegaun	काँटेगाउँ		28°15'N	82°53'E	2,010
Latighot	लाटिघोट		28°14'N	82°53'E	1,410
Musigade	मुसीगाडे		28°14'N	82°54'E	1,450
Narsinge	नारसिङ्गे		28°13'N	82°53'E	1,830
Patal	पातल		28°13'N	82°52'E	1,890
Pokhara	पोखरा	4	28°14'N	82°52'E	1,670
Sano Damri	सानो डाम्री		28°15'N	82°52'E	1,638
Thulo Damri	ठूलो डाम्री	3	28°15'N	82°52'E	1,750
