= Markabang =

Markabang मर्काबाङ
- Village Development Committee
- Location in Nepal
- Coordinates: 28.02°N 82.72°E
- Country: Nepal
- Region: Mid-Western
- Province: Lumbini Province
- District: Pyuthan District
- VDC: Markabang

Population (2001 Census)
  - Total: 2,649
- 456 households
- Time zone: UTC+5:45 (Nepal Time)

Markabang is a village and Village Development Committee in Pyuthan, a Middle Hills district of Lumbini Province, western Nepal.

== Villages in this VDC ==
		Ward	Lat.	Lon	Elev.
Batule	बाटुले		28°03'N	82°44'E	650m
Dhan	ढाण		28°00'N	82°44'E	1,210
Dhan Chaur	धान चौर	3	28°01'N	82°44'E	810
Dhand	ढाँड		28°01'N	82°45'E	1,410
Dhikaban	ढिकाबन	9	28°02'N	82°44'E	670
Golbang	गोलबाङ		28°00'N	82°45'E	998
Khukuli Chaur	खुकुली चौर	7	28°01'N	82°42'E	1,085
Markabang	मर्काबाङ	5	28°01'N	82°43'E	1,330
Pipal Chheda	पिपल छेडा		28°01'N	82°42'E	1,390
Pukruk	पुक्रुक		28°02'N	82°43'E	1,330
Ratapani	रातापानी	4	28°01'N	82°44'E	971
Ritha Chaur	रिठा चौर		28°01'N	82°43'E	1,350
Thuli Chaur	ठूली चौर		28°00'N	82°45'E	1,470
