= Khung =

Khung खुङ
- Village Development Committee
- Location in Nepal
- Coordinates: 28.20°N 83.02°E
- Country: Nepal
- Region: Mid-Western
- Province: Lumbini Province
- District: Pyuthan District
- VDC: Khung

Population (2001 Census)
  - Total: 2,056
- 370 households
- Time zone: UTC+5:45 (Nepal Time)

Khung is a village and Village Development Committee in Pyuthan, a Middle Hills district of Lumbini Province, western Nepal.

== Villages in this V.D.C. ==
		Ward	Lat.	Lon	Elev.
Bhedabari	भेडाबारी	2	28°13'N	83°01'E	1,342m
Chhape	छापे		28°12'N	83°01'E	1,398
Dashmure	दशमुरे	8	28°11'N	83°01'E	1,387
Deurali	देउराली		28°11'N	83°02'E	1,775
Dihi	डिही		28°11'N	83°01'E	1,317
Eklesalla	एक्लेसल्ला		28°12'N	83°01'E	1,690
Khal	खाल		28°11'N	83°01'E	1,545
Khalchaur	खालचौर		28°12'N	83°02'E	1,885
Khung	खुङ	3	28°13'N	83°01'E	1,590
Ledemela	लेडेमेला	9	28°11'N	83°01'E	1,659
Lohata	लोहाटा		28°12'N	83°00'E	1,290
Ranga Katne	राँगा काट्ने		28°12'N	83°02'E	1,750
Sali Bisauna	साली बिसौना	6	28°12'N	83°00'E	1,170
Sulihale	सुलीहाले		28°12'N	83°01'E	1,625
Thulo Besi	ठूलो बेसी	4	28°13'N	83°01'E	1,145
