= Dhubang =

Dhubang धुबाङ
- Village development committee
- Location in Nepal
- Coordinates: 28.01°N 82.85°E
- Country: Nepal
- Region: Mid-Western
- Zone: Rapti Zone
- District: Pyuthan District
- VDC: Dhubang

Population (2001 Census)
  - Total: 3,002
- 517 households
- Time zone: UTC+5:45 (Nepal Time)

Dhubang is a town and village development committee in Pyuthan, a Middle Hills district of Rapti Zone, western Nepal.

== Villages in VDC ==
		Ward	Lat.	Lon	Elev.
Ambare	अम्बरे		27°59'N	82°51'E	790m
Budhichaur	बुढीचौर		28°01'N	82°51'E	1,639
Chhap	छाप		28°02'N	82°50'E	750
Chhatiun Damar	छतिउन दमार	7	27°59'N	82°50'E	530
Chhatunkholagaun	छतुनखोलागाउँ		28°00'N	82°50'E	790
Chuna	चुना		27°58'N	82°51'E	570
Chutreni	चुत्रेनी		28°00'N	82°53'E	1,630
Dahachaur	दहचौर		27°59'N	82°50'E	790
Dhubang	धुबाङ	2	28°02'N	82°51'E	730
Gaujikholagaun	गौजीखोलागाउँ		28°00'N	82°50'E	710
Golja	गोल्जा		28°01'N	82°53'E	1,155
Habrukholagaun	हाब्रुखोलागाउँ		28°00'N	82°52'E	1,675
Hapurkholagaun	हपुरखोलागाउँ		28°00'N	82°51'E	950
Harnaghat	हर्नाघाट	3	28°02'N	82°53'E	730
Jangale	जङ्गले		28°00'N	82°51'E	930
Kairan	कैरान	3	28°02'N	82°52'E	712
Kharka	खर्क		28°00'N	82°51'E	1,535
Khumchi	खुम्ची		28°03'N	82°50'E	718
Kumring	कुम्रिङ		28°00'N	82°53'E	1,050
Maha Pokhari	मह पोखरी		28°01'N	82°50'E	1,633
Ratmata	रातमाटा		28°00'N	82°50'E	650
Sansare	सनसरे		28°00'N	82°52'E	1,130
Sirubari	सिरुबारी	7	27°59'N	82°51'E	1,143
Tigra Patal	तिग्रा पाताल		28°01'N	82°50'E	1,399
Tilkeni	तिलकेनी	6	28°01'N	82°51'E	1,230
Tori Bhanjyang	तोरी भज्ञ्याङ		28°00'N	82°50'E	910
Yarikholagaun	यारीखोलागाउँ		28°02'N	82°50'E	1,110
