= Dharampani =

Dharampani may refer to:

- Dharampani, Gandaki
- Dharampani, Rapti
