= Naya Gaun =

Naya Gaun may refer to:

- Naya Gaun, Bheri, Nepal
- Naya Gaun, Rapti, Nepal
