= Dharampani, Rapti =

Village Development Committee in Mid-Western, Nepal

Dharampani धरमपानी
- Village Development Committee
- Location in Nepal
- Coordinates: 28.07°N 82.75°E
- Country: Nepal
- Region: Mid-Western
- Zone: Rapti Zone
- District: Pyuthan District
- VDC: Dharampani

Population (2001 Census)
  - Total: 2,859
- 560 households
- Time zone: UTC+5:45 (Nepal Time)

Dharampani is a village and Village Development Committee in Pyuthan, a Middle Hills district of Rapti Zone, western Nepal.

== Villages in the Village Development Committee ==
		Ward	Lat.	Lon	Elev.
Argeli	अर्गेली		28°03'N	82°56'E	1,079m
Banchare	बन्चरे		28°04'N	82°55'E	1,190
Barbot	बरबोट	8	28°04'N	82°56'E	1,272
Bhedikhore	भेडीखोरे		28°03'N	82°56'E	870
Bujathati	बुजाथाटी		28°03'N	82°57'E	805
Bukeni	बुकेनी	5	28°05'N	82°55'E	1,685
Chauthi Laune	चौथी लाउने		28°04'N	82°56'E	1,308
Chhap	छाप		28°04'N	82°55'E	1,170
Dhanubas	धनुबास		28°05'N	82°55'E	1,370
Dharampani	धरमपानी	2	28°04'N	82°54'E	1,250
Gahtara	गहतरा		28°04'N	82°56'E	1,045
Girichaur	गिरीचौर	1	28°04'N	82°53'E	1,570
Jebundanda	जेबुनडाँडा		28°04'N	82°55'E	1,142
Khanidanda	खानीडाँडा		28°03'N	82°53'E	1,210
Maidan	मैदान		28°04'N	82°56'E	1,198
Manjh Pokhara	माँझ पोखरा		28°04'N	82°56'E	1,170
Mundanda	मुनडाँडा		28°04'N	82°56'E	1,418
Nisan Takura	निसान टाकुरा		28°05'N	82°55'E	1,461
Sirkot	सिरकोट		28°04'N	82°53'E	1,485
Tallo Takura	तल्लो टाकुरा		28°04'N	82°56'E	1,100
