= Torbang =

Torbang तोरबाङ
- Village Development Committee
- Location in Nepal
- Coordinates: 28.08°N 82.80°E
- Country: Nepal
- Region: Mid-Western
- Province: Lumbini Province
- District: Pyuthan District
- VDC: Torbang

Population (2001 Census)
  - Total: 3,785
- 728 households
- Time zone: UTC+5:45 (Nepal Time)

Torbang is a town and Village Development Committee in Pyuthan, a Middle Hills district of Lumbini Province, western Nepal.

== Villages in this VDC ==
		Ward	Lat.	Lon	Elev.
Argali	अर्गली	5	28°09'N	82°57'E	965m
Bista Tol	बिष्ट टोल		28°08'N	82°55'E	1,070
Chisabang	चिसाबाङ	6	28°08'N	82°56'E	905
Dahakholagaun	दहखोलागाउँ	1	28°08'N	82°55'E	970
Ghumnethanti	घुम्नेठँटी		28°08'N	82°55'E	1,085
Kutichaur	कुटीचौर		28°09'N	82°55'E	870
Lekh	लेख		28°07'N	82°57'E	1,610
Markabang	मर्काबाङ	4	28°08'N	82°57'E	1,450
Neta	नेटा		28°08'N	82°56'E	1,205
Ninyukharka	निन्युखर्क		28°09'N	82°55'E	1,055
Nipane	निपाने		28°08'N	82°57'E	1,246
Salleri	स्ल्लेरी		28°07'N	82°57'E	1,490
Torbang	तोरबाङ	8	28°08'N	82°55'E	1,270
