= Damri =

Damri or DAMRI may refer to:

- Perum DAMRI, a state owned public transit bus company in Jakarta, Indonesia
- Damri, Nepal
