= Pyuthan Municipality =

Pyuthan प्यूठान नगरपालिका Pyuthan Khalanga
- Municipality
- Location in Nepal Pyuthan (Nepal)
- Coordinates: 28°06′N 82°52′E
- Country: Nepal
- Province: Lumbini Province
- District: Pyuthan District
- Parliamentary constituency: Pyuthan 1
- Provincial constituencies: Pyuthan 1(A), Pyuthan 1(B)
- Established: 2014

Government
  - Type: Mayor-council
  - Mayor: Bishnu Yogi
  - Deputy Mayor: Devendra Brahma

Area
  - Total: 128.96 km^{2} (49.79 sq mi)

Population (2011)
  - Total: 38,449
  - Density: 298.15/km^{2} (772.20/sq mi)
- Time zone: UTC+5:45 (NST)
- Postal code: 22300
- Area code: 086
- Website: pyuthanmun.gov.np

Pyuthan is a municipality in the Pyuthan District in the Lumbini Province of Nepal. This municipality is named after the district name Pyuthan. It is also the major market center and the administrative center of district. The municipality was established on 18 May 2014 by merging the existing VDCs Khaira, Dakha Kwadi, Bijaya Nagar, Bijuwar, Dharmawati, Maranthana and Khalanga village development committees. In 2017, when GoN restructured the local level bodies into 753 units, Pyuthan Municipality was also restructured excluding ward no. 1, 2, 3, 5 and 18 from old structure, further two other VDCs; Majhkot and Jumrikanda added, Khalanga separated and managed the municipality into 10 new wards. Nayabajar Jumri and Bijuwar are the major markets of Pyuthan Municipality.

The town is situated about 500 meters above the intensively cultivated floodplain of Jhimruk Khola about 15 kilometers north of the Mahabharat Range in the Middle Hills. Besides expansive views of Jhimruk valley, there are limited views of a few peaks in the western part of the Dhaulagiri range off to the north. The town is populated by government officials, soldiers, and police of Magar and other "hill tribes" and their mostly Chhettri officers, by Newar merchants, by civil servants recruited mostly from local Brahmin and Chhetri castes, as well as menial castes who labor as tailors, cobblers, blacksmiths and construction workers.

Before King Gyanendra was removed from office in 2008B.S, this district center was virtually a royalist island in a republican sea. Pyuthan district was the home base of Mohan Bikram Singh who was a charter member of the Communist Party of Nepal. Singh did extensive organizational work in his home district and other parts of Rapti Zone, resulting in local opposition to the Shah dynasty that largely ran the country. Although M. B. Singh was marginalized in leftist politics before the Nepalese Civil War broke out in 1996, his organizational work helped make Rapti Zone the "heartland" of the insurgency and left the district center vulnerable and isolated for the duration.

Pyuthan has scheduled bus service via the east-west Mahendra Highway and a spur road from Bhalubang along the West Rapti River. This road has been paved for all-weather use.

== Etymology ==
Pyuthan Khalanga (Nepali: खलङ्गा) means military barracks. It generally signifies a military post larger than a kot (Nepali: कोट).

== Media ==
To promote local culture Pyuthan has four community radio stations; Radio Mandavi - 97.0 MHz and Radio Pyuthan - 92.0 MHz, Radio Kripalu and Radio Lisne Aawaj. Similarly weekly newspapers are also published.

== Settlements that are part of Pyuthan ==
		Ward	Lat.	Lon	Elev.
Khaira	खैरा	1	28°04'N	81°53'E	1,140m
Dakhakwadi	दाखाक्वाडी	2	28°06'N	82°53'E	1,150m
Bijaynagar	बिजयनगर	3	28°05'N	82°52'E	1,305
Bijuwar	बिजुवार	4	28°05'N	82°54'E	1,423
Jumrikadha	जुम्रीकाँडा	5	28°05'N	82°53'E	1,250
Majhkot	माझकोट	6	28°06'N	82°53'E	1,287
Tikuri	टिकुरी	7	28°05'N	82°53'E	1,318
Dharmawati	धर्मावती	8	28°06'N	82°52'E	918
Maranthana	मरन्ठाना	9	28°04'N	82°54'E	1,298
Saaribang	सारीबाङ	10	28°06'N	82°53'E	1,010
