= Raspurkot =

Raspurkot रस्पुरकोट
- Village Development Committee
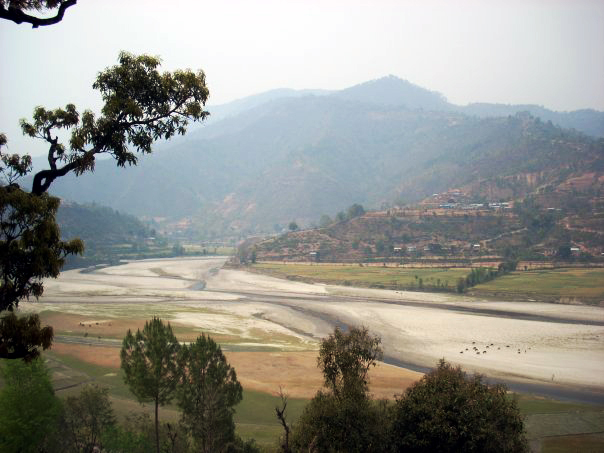

- Location in Nepal
- Coordinates: 28.05°N 82.90°E
- Country: Nepal
- Region: Mid-Western
- Province: Lumbini Province
- District: Pyuthan District
- VDC: Raspurkot

Population (2001 Census)
  - Total: 3,144
- 626 households
- Time zone: UTC+5:45 (Nepal Time)

Raspurkot is a town and Village Development Committee in Pyuthan, a Middle Hills district of Lumbini Province, western Nepal.

== Villages in this VDC ==
Name	Native Name	Ward No.	Lat.	Lon	Elev.
Bali Bisauna	बाली बिसौना	5	28°02'N	82°55'E	967m
Budhichaur	बुढीचौर	8	28°03'N	82°55'E	1,130
Chaurpani	चौरपानी	8	28°03'N	82°55'E	1,210
Dandakharka	डाँडाखर्क	5	28°02'N	82°54'E	1,170
Darga	दर्गा		28°03'N	82°51'E	790
Dhuibang	धुइबाङ	4	28°02'N	82°54'E	658
Gothibang	गोठीबाङ	4	28°02'N	82°55'E	710
Khaban	खबाङ	3	28°02'N	82°53'E	725
Raspurkot	रस्पुरकोट		28°03'N	82°54'E	1,590
Sarangbesi	सराङबेसी	2	28°02'N	82°52'E	705
Sinduredanda	सिन्दुरेडाँडा		28°03'N	82°52'E	1,150
