= Naya Gaun, Pyuthan =

Naya Gaun नयाँगाउँ
- Village Development Committee
- Location in Nepal
- Coordinates: 28.08°N 82.80°E
- Country: Nepal
- Region: Mid-Western
- Province: Lumbini Province
- District: Pyuthan District
- VDC: Naya Gaun

Population (2001 Census)
  - Total: 2,682
- 584 households
- Time zone: UTC+5:45 (Nepal Time)

Naya Gaun is a village and Village Development Committee in Pyuthan, a Middle Hills district of Lumbini Province, western Nepal.

== Etymology ==
naya (Nepali: नयाँ) - new.
gaun (Nepali: गाउँ) - village.

mandvi gaupalika ward,3

== Villages in this ward ==
		Ward	Lat.	Lon	Elev.	
Anpchaur	आँपचौर		28°04'N	82°47'E	1,095m	
Darimchaur	दारिमचौर		28°04'N	82°48'E	550	
Devisthan	देवीस्थान		28°02'N	82°47'E	550	
Jabune	जाबुने		28°04'N	82°48'E	541	
Jaspur	जसपुर	1	28°03'N	82°47'E	550	
Lamachaur	लामाचौर		28°06'N	82°47'E	670	
Marsibang	मर्सीबाङ		28°06'N	82°47'E	650	
Nayagaun	नयाँगाउँ	3	28°05'N	82°48'E	570	
Sallibesi	सल्लीबेसी		28°05'N	82°47'E	630	
Sallikot	सल्लीकोट		28°05'N		82°46'E	1,110
