= Liwang, Taplejung =

Liwang, Mechi लिवाङ
- Village development committee
- Location in Nepal
- Coordinates: 27.44°N 87.64°E
- Country: Nepal
- Province: Province No. 1
- District: Taplejung District

Population (2011)
  - Total: 1,753
- Time zone: UTC+5:45 (Nepal Time)

Liwang, Mechi is a village development committee in the Himalayas of Taplejung District in the Province No. 1 of north-eastern Nepal. At the time of the 2011 Nepal census it had a population of 1,753 people living in 359 households. There were 810 males and 943 females at the time of census.
