= Libang, Pyuthan =

Libang लिबाङ
- Village Development Committee
- Location in Nepal
- Coordinates: 28°18′N 82°38′E
- Country: Nepal
- Region: Mid-Western
- Province: Lumbini Province
- District: Pyuthan District
- VDC: Libang

Population (2001 Census)
  - Total: 3,262
- 587 households
- Time zone: UTC+5:45 (Nepal Time)

Libang is a town and Village Development Committee in Pyuthan, a Middle Hills district of Lumbini Province, western Nepal.

== Villages in this VDC ==
		Ward	Lat.	Lon	Elev.
Bolde	बोल्दे		28°12'N	82°59'E	1,270m
Bukurchaur	बुकुरचौर	1	28°12'N	82°57'E	2,010
Dakas	डाकस		28°12'N	82°57'E	1,870
Daphle	दाफ्ले	5	28°11'N	82°59'E	1,330
Dehalna	देहाल्ना		28°11'N	82°57'E	2,055
Gothantidanda	गोठाँटीडाँडा		28°13'N	82°58'E	2,010
Kaseri	कसेरी		28°12'N	82°59'E	1,390
Kopche	कोप्चे		28°13'N	82°58'E	1,618
Libang	लिबाङ	5	28°12'N	82°58'E	1,610
Mahapata	महपाटा		28°12'N	82°59'E	1,415
Sirwari	सिरवारी		28°11'N	82°57'E	1,690
Timurchaur	टिमुरचौर	8	28°11'N	82°58'E	1,690
Timurchaur Lekh	टिमुरचौर लेख		28°11'N	82°57'E	1,830
