= Pyuthan District =

Coordinates: 28°05′N 082°50′E

Pyuṭhān District प्युठान जिल्ला
- District
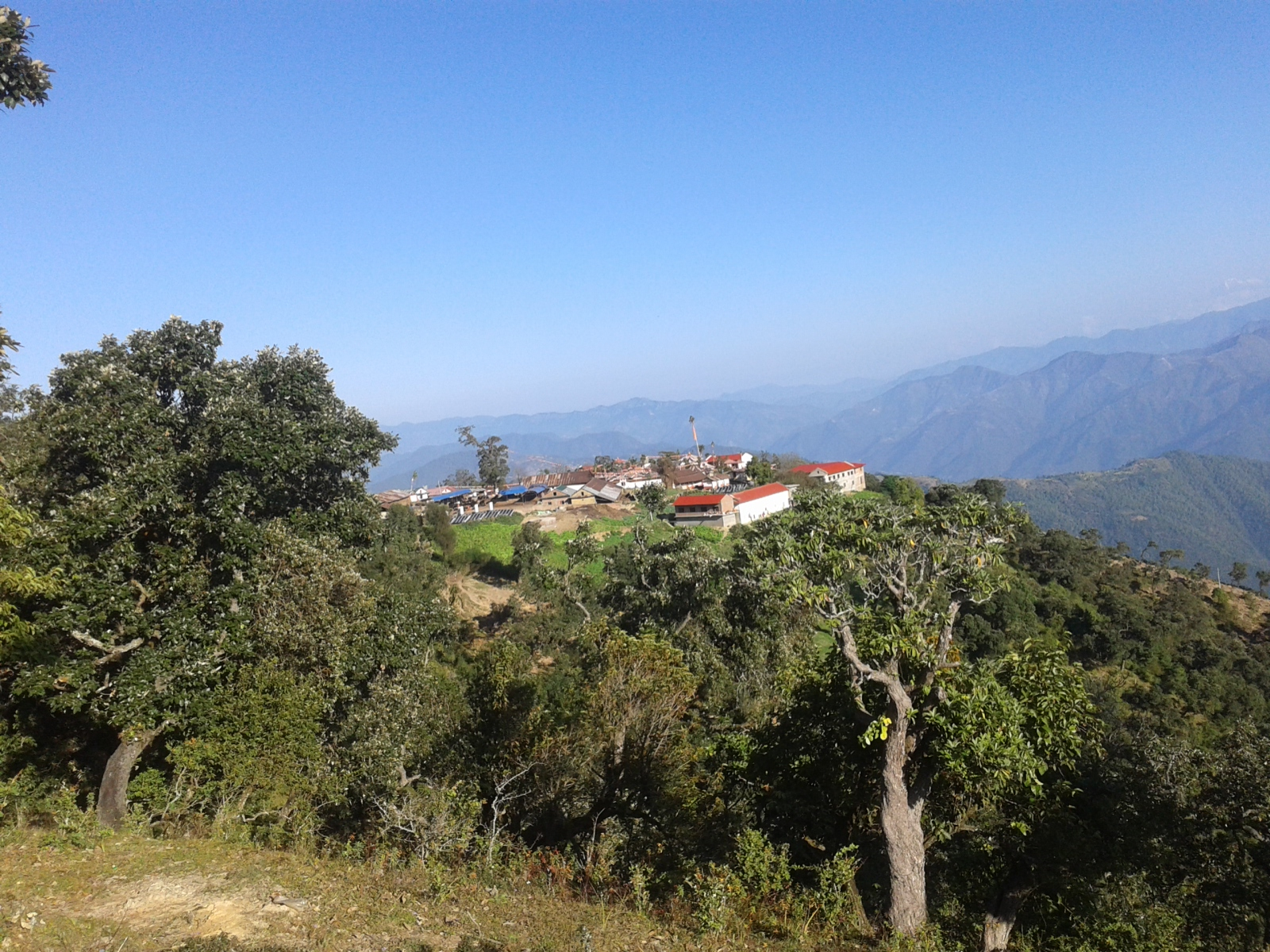
- Swargadwari temple

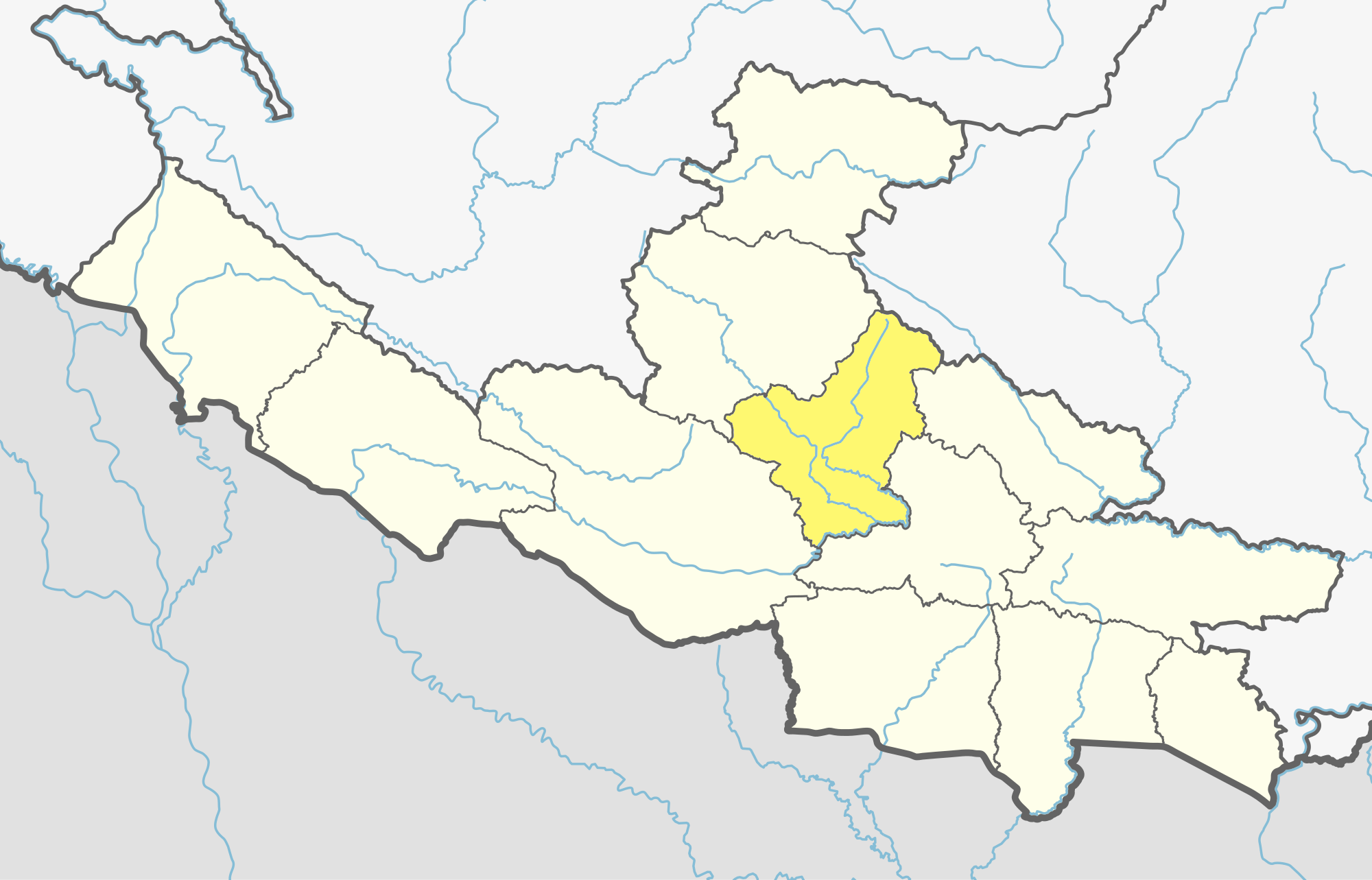
- Location of Pyuthan (dark yellow) in Lumbini Province
- Country: Nepal
- Province: Lumbini Province
- Admin HQ.: Pyuthan

Government
  - Type: Coordination committee
  - Body: DCC, Pyuthān

Area
  - Total: 1,309 km^{2} (505 sq mi)

Population (2011)
  - Total: 226,796
  - Density: 173.3/km^{2} (448.7/sq mi)
- Time zone: UTC+05:45 (NPT)
- Main Language(s): Nepali, Newari, Khamkura

Pyuthan District (Nepali: प्युठान जिल्ला [piu̯ʈʰan], is a "hill" district some 427.6 km (265.7 mi) west of Kathmandu in Lumbini Province in midwestern Nepal. Pyuthan covers an area of 1,309 km^{2} (505 sq mi) with population of 212,484 in 2001 and 226,796 in 2011. Pyuthan Khalanga is the district's administrative center.

== Geography and climate ==
Pyuthan borders Dang Deukhuri District to the southwest along the crest of the Mahabharat Range and extends about 50 km (31 mi) northeast through the Middle Hills to a 3,000+ meter ridge that is both Pyuthan's border with Baglung district of Dhaulagiri Zone and the main watershed between the (west) Rapti and Gandaki River basins. Pyuthan borders Rolpa district to the west. Of the two upper tributaries of the West Rapti River, Pyuthan contains all of Jhimruk Khola and the lower part of Madi Khola after it exits Rolpa. The Madi-Jhimruk confluence is in southern Pyuthan, in the Mahabharat Range.

The valley of Jhimruk Khola is the core of Pyuthan district. Its alluvial plain is intensively planted in rice during the summer monsoon. Wheat is grown as the winter crop. Madi Khola has eroded an inner gorge and is less suited to traditional irrigated agriculture.

| Climate Zone | Elevation Range | % of Area |
|---|---|---|
| Upper Tropical | 300 to 1,000 meters 1,000 to 3,300 ft. | 36.1% |
| Subtropical | 1,000 to 2,000 meters 3,300 to 6,600 ft. | 53.3% |
| Temperate | 2,000 to 3,000 meters 6,400 to 9,800 ft. | 9.7% |
| Subalpine | 3,000 to 4,000 meters 9,800 to 13,100 ft. | 0.8% |

== Demographics ==
At the time of the 2021 Nepal census, Pyuthan District had a population of 232,019. 9.28% of the population is under 5 years of age. It has a literacy rate of 80.13% and a sex ratio of 1228 females per 1000 males. 74,167 (31.97%) lived in municipalities..

Castes/ethnic groups in Pyuthan district (2021)
1. Magar (33.7%)
2. Chhetri (25.6%)
3. Kami (13.7%)
4. Bahun (8.51%)
5. Sarki (4.22%)
6. Damai (3.16%)
7. Dasnami (2.84%)
8. Newar (1.57%)
9. Kumal (1.50%)
10. Gurung (1.49%)
11. Thakuri (1.16%)
12. Other Hill Janjati (1.56%)
13. Others (0.99%)

Hill Janjatis make up 38% of the population, of which Magar is the single largest ethnicity at 34%, Kumal is 2%, Newar 2%, and Gurung 1%. Khas people constitute the majority at 59% of the population, of which Khas Dalits make up 21%

Languages of Pyuthan district (2021)
1. Nepali (94.9%)
2. Magar (3.36%)
3. Others (1.77%)

At the time of the 2021 census, 94.87% of the population spoke Nepali and 3.36% Magar as their first language. In 2011, 96.2% of the population spoke Nepali as their first language.

Religion in Pyuthan District (2021)
| Religion | Percent |
| Hinduism | 96.47% |
| Prakriti | 1.61% |
| Buddhism | 1.24% |
| Other or not stated | 0.68% |

== Administrative divisions ==
Pyuthan district is divided into 9 local level bodies in which two are municipalities and seven are rural municipalities:

Municipality

- Pyuthan Municipality
- Sworgadwari Municipality

Rural Municipality

- Gaumukhi Rural Municipality
- Mandavi Rural Municipality
- Sarumarani Rural Municipality
- Mallarani Rural Municipality
- Naubahini Rural Municipality
- Jhimruk Rural Municipality
- Airawati Rural Municipality

=== Former VDCs ===
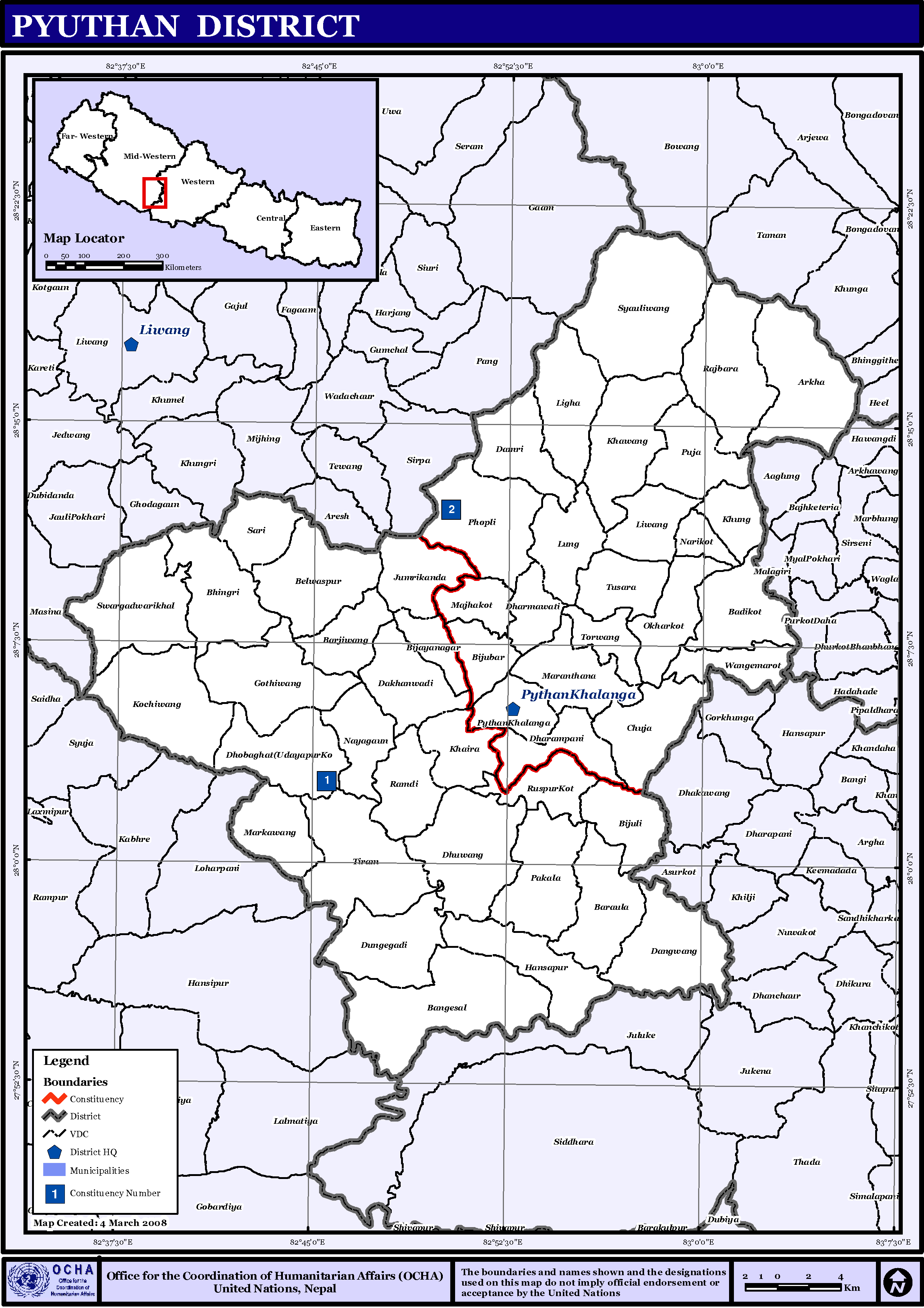
VDCs in Pyuthan

- Arkha
- (Bagdula), Bandikot, Bangemarkot, Bangesal, Baraula, Barjibang, Belbas, Bhingri, Bijaya Nagar, Bijuli, Bijuwar
- Chunja
- Dakha Kwadi, Damri, Dangbang, Dharampani, Dharmawati, Dhobaghat, Dhubang, Dhungegadhi
- Gothibang
- Hansapur
- Jumrikanda
- Khabang, Khaira, Pyuthan Municipality, Khung, Kochibang, (Kwadi)
- Libang, Ligha, Lung
- Majhakot, Maranthana, Markabang
- Narikot, Naya Gaun
- Okharkot
- Pakala, Phopli, Puja
- Rajbara, Ramdi, Raspurkot, (Ratamata)
- (Sapdanda), Sari, Swargadwarikhal, Syaulibang
- (Tikuri), Tiram, Torbang, Tusara
- (Udayapurkot)
- Pandeydada khalanga

== Historic and cultural sites ==
- Airabati, Asurkot
- Bandhikot, Bhagawati Temple, Bhawaniswari Temple, Bhimsensthan, Bhimsen Temple (Kutichaur), Bhimsen Temple (Megazun), Bhimsen Temple (Bijbazar), Bhitrikot Cave, Bhitrikot Durbar, Bhringri Kot, Bhumesthan (Khaira), Bijulikot, Birdisthan
- Chhetrapal Temple
- Devi Bhagawati, Devi Bhagawati Temple, Devi Temple, Dhunge Gadhi, Dubanasthan
- Ganesh Temple, Ganeshsthan, Gaumukhi, Gorakhnath Temple (Khaira), Gorakhnath Temple (Dakha Kwadi), Gorakhnath Temple (Bijbazar)
- Jalpadevi Temple, (Bijbazar – Bhagwati), Jalpadevi Temple (Bijbazar), Jhankristhan (Khaira)
- Kalidevi Temple, Kali Temple, Kalika Malika, Khadga Devata Temple, Khalanga Shivalaya, Khungrikot
- Laxmi Narayan Temple
- Masta Mandau, Mehelnath Temple
- Okharkot
- Phalaharisthan, Pyuthan Magazine
- Radha Krishna Temple, Rameswar Temple, Rani Pauwa
- Saraswati Temple, Sarikot, Shiva Temple (Khaira), Shiva Temple (Lung), Shiva Temple (Bangeshal), Shiva Temple (Khalanga), Shivalaya, Siddha Devatasthan (Belbas), Siddha Sansarsthan (Dakha Kwadi)
- Swargadwari—a hilltop temple complex and pilgrimage site celebrating the importance of cows in Hinduism—is located in the southern part of Pyuthan.
- Tatopani Shivalaya, Tripurasundari, Tusharakot Isnasthan
- Udayapur Kot
- Pandeydada khalanga Shree Satyadevi Bhagwati Mandir, 12-bhai Baraha Dev Mandir
