= Khaira, Nepal =

Village Development Committee in Rapti Zone, Nepal

- Village Development Committee
- Interactive map of Khaira, Nepal
- Coordinates: 28.07°N 82.85°E
- Country: Nepal
- Zone: Rapti Zone
- District: Pyuthan District

Population (1991)
  - Total: 4,217
- Time zone: UTC+5:45 (Nepal Time)

Khaira was a town and Village Development Committee in Pyuthan District in the Rapti Zone of central south-western Nepal. At the time of the 1991 Nepal census it had a population of 4,217 persons residing in 769 individual households.
