= Rapti Zone =

Former administrative area in Nepal

Coordinates: 28°20′N 82°30′E

Rapti Zone राप्ती अञ्चल
- Zone
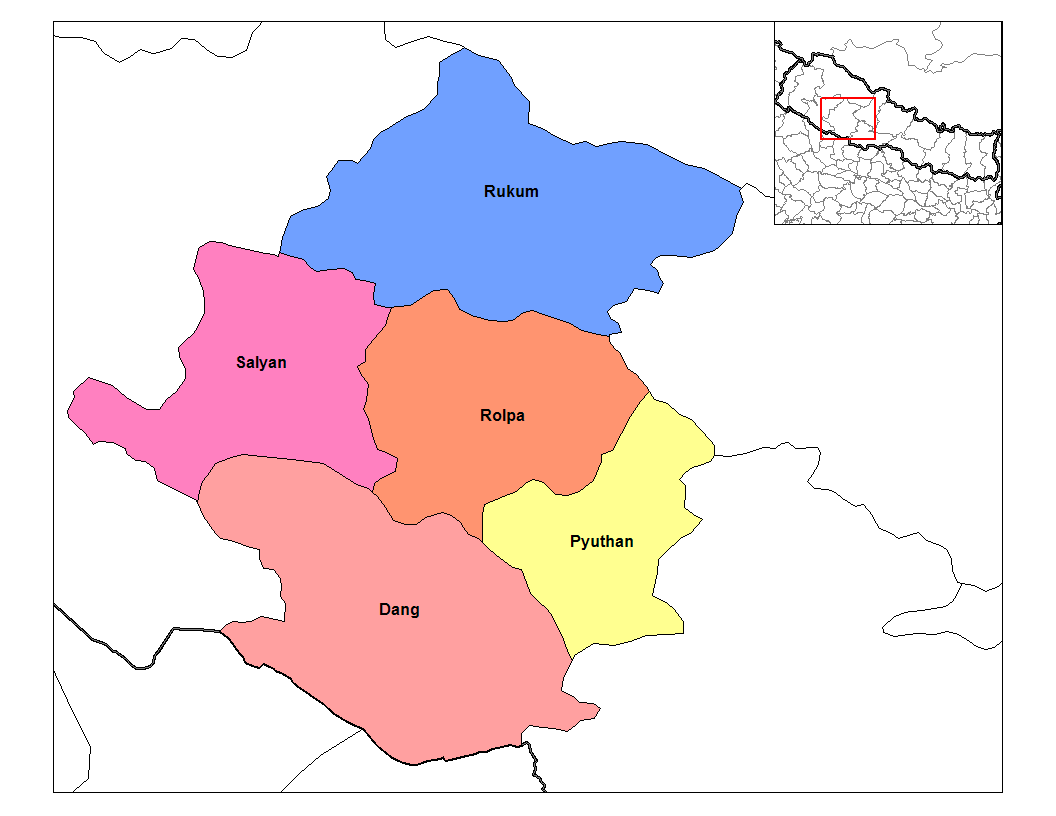
- Country: Nepal
- Time zone: UTC+5:45 (Nepal Time)

Rapti Zone (Nepali: राप्ती अञ्चल) was one of the fourteen zones, located in the Mid-Western Development Region of Nepal. It was named after the West Rapti River which drains Rolpa, Pyuthan and part of Dang districts. The remainder of Dang and part of Salyan district are drained by the Babai. The remainder of Salyan and all of Rukum districts are drained by the Bheri.

The headquarters of Rapti were Tulsipur and the largest city was Tribhuvannagar (Ghorahi). Other main cities and towns of Rapti zone were Pyuthan Khalanga, Bijuwar, Liwang, Lamahi, Musikot, Rukumkot (Shova), and Chaurjahari.

== Administrative subdivisions ==
Rapti was divided into five districts; since 2015 the three eastern districts (and the eastern part of Rukum District) have been redesignated as part of Lumbini Province, while Salyan District and the western part of Rukum District have been redesignated as part of Karnali Province.

District	Type	Headquarters	Since 2015 part of Province
Dang	Inner Terai	Ghorahi	Lumbini Province
Pyuthan	Hill	Pyuthan Khalanga	Lumbini Province
Rolpa	Hill	Liwang	Lumbini Province
Rukum	Hill	Musikot (Jhumlikhalanga)	divided into Eastern Rukum District (Lumbini Province) and Western Rukum District (Karnali Province)
Salyan	Hill	Salyan Khalanga	Karnali Province

== Geography ==
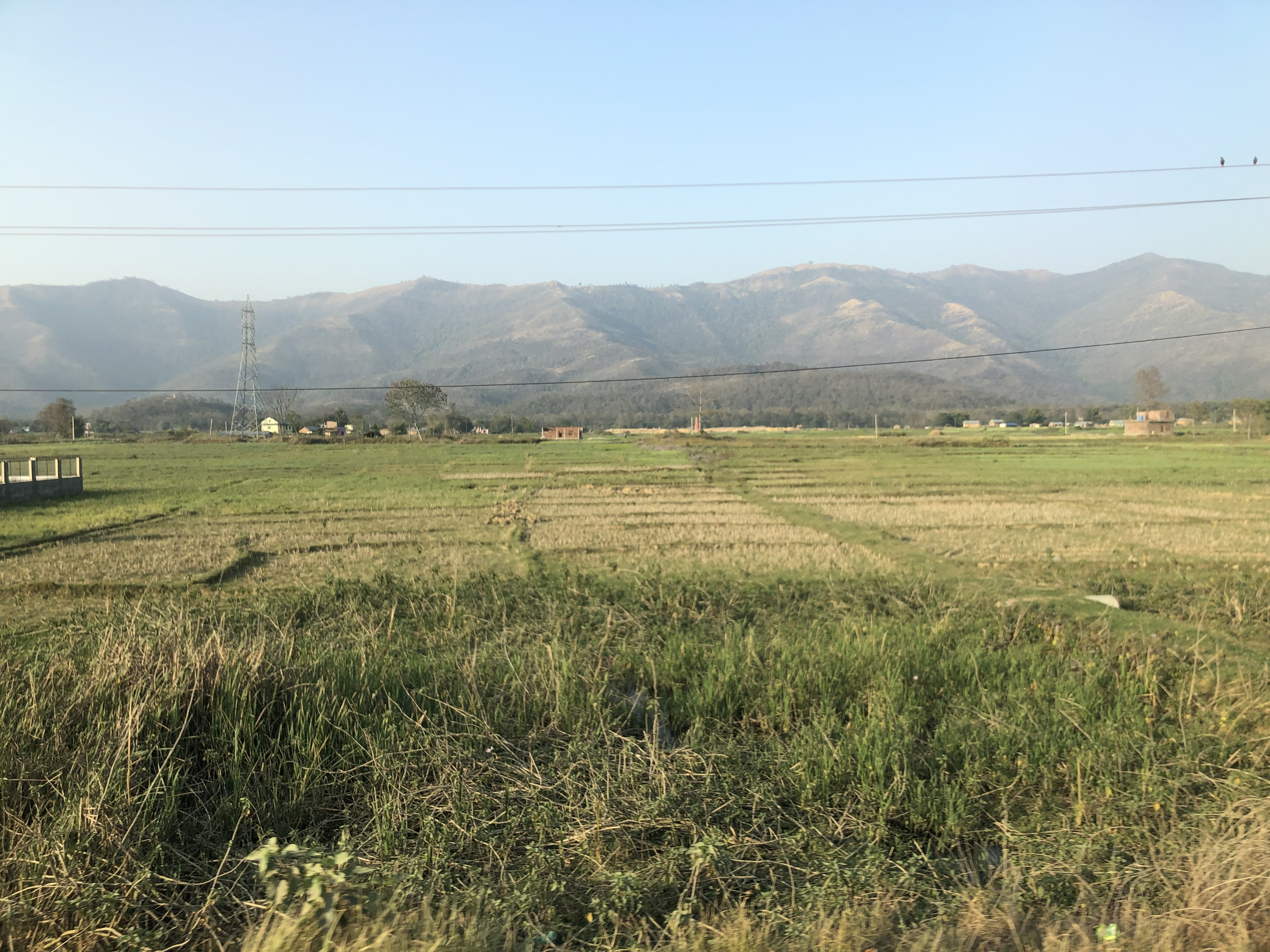
Rapti in February 2019

Dang District begins at the border with India. Since the border follows the southern edge of the Dudhwa Range—a subrange of the Siwaliks, here there is no Nepalese Outer Terai extending onto the main Indo-Gangetic Plain. Dang has two Inner Terai Valleys. Deukhuri lies beyond the Dudhwas, then a second low subrange—the Dang Range—separates Deukhuri from Dang Valley. Beyond Dang Valley the district extends to the crest of the higher Mahabharat Range.

The two valleys have abundant level and gently-sloping land with fair to good soil development, and abundant groundwater. Malaria made them nearly uninhabitable except to the Tharu ethnic group that had evolved resistance. In the 1960s DDT came into use to suppress the mosquito vectors and the way was open to settlers from the hills who used debt and lawsuits to displace and even enslave Tharus.

Dang is the most developed and most rapidly developing of the zone's five districts. Mahendra Highway, Nepal's main east-west route, follows Deukhuri Valley. Dang Valley has two important towns, Tribuvan nagar and Tulsipur, and an all-weather airport.

Pyuthan, Rolpa and Salyan Districts are in the Middle Hills extending north from the crest of the Mahabharat Range. Pyuthan has a rice-growing alluvial plain along Jhimruk Khola, surrounded by villages of rice-growing Bahun and Chhetri farmers served by bazaar towns of Newar merchants. Rolpa district mainly lies along Mardi Khola, the other large Rapti tributary that is more eroded into an inner gorge and less suited to traditional irrigation projects.

Pyuthan and Rolpa extend north to a rugged 3-4,000 meter ridgeline marking the limits of the Rapti Basin. Kham Magar live in Big Area throughout these highlands up to about 2,500 meters. They herd sheep, goats and cattle in high summer pastures as far north as the western Dhaulagiri Himalaya in Rukum district, moving south to the Mahabharat Range in winter. Kham also cultivate subtropical and temperate fruit trees such as mulberry, citrus and Asian pear as cash crops. Until it was outlawed in the 1970s they cultivated hemp and made hashish bought by government agents to be sold in monopoly stores. Termination of these arrangements increased Kham outmigration in search of employment and contributed to discontent with the Shah regime.

Salyan resembles Pyuthan in having a mix of rice-growing lowlands inhabited by caste Hindus, and uplands inhabited by Kham peoples. It is drained by the Babai and Bheri rivers.

Rukum is Rapi Zone's northernmost, most mountainous district including the western part of Dhaulagiri Himalaya drained by the Bheri River. At lower elevations it is populated by Hindu Khas people said to be ancestral to most of Nepal's Bahuns and Chhetris living further east. Kham Magars live higher up. A notable valley called Rukumkot lies near the district's geographical center.

Rapti Zone has a history of radical politics since the mid-20th century and in the 1990s became a center of the Maoist rebellion against the royal government and the fragile democracy that the late King Birendra eventually supported.

== Economic development ==
Historically, geographic isolation inhibited economic development in Rapti Zone. Trans-himalayan trade routes lay to the east along the Kaligandaki River and to the west along the Bheri and Karnali. Compared to these, a hypothetical transhimalayan trade route through Rapti would have been impeded by a wide Inner Terai malarial belt, by ridges up to 4,000 meters exiting the Rapti watershed, then by the Dhaulagiri Himalayas and the only comparatively lower Kagmara and Tibetan border ranges before reaching the Tibetan Plateau.

Elsewhere in Nepal the Outer Terai began developing in the mid 1930s because the Rana dynasty sought limited industrial development and because development could easily spread from India across a border with little impediment. However, in Rapti Zone the border turned north to follow the base of the first range of foothills. Areas suited for development were confined to valleys beyond these low but rugged mountains. Furthermore, these valleys remained dangerously malarial until USAID began spraying DDT in 1954.

In Rapti's Middle Hills the only economic activity of interest to the government in Kathmandu was cottage hashish production from scattered plantings of Cannabis indica. Government agents carried marijuana and balls of charas to Kathmandu for retail and export to India. This trade ended in 1974 in response to U.S. pressure and inducements. USAID promoted temperate climate fruit and food crops as replacement cash crops, but this program failed due to lack of adequate transportation out of the hills. Otherwise there was limited local trade, no industry and hardly any agriculture beyond subsistence to tax, so the national government found little incentive for involvement in Rapti zone.

By the 1960s land-hungry hill people began to settle in the Dang and Deukhuri valleys and in the 1980s the east-west Mahendra Highway was built across the country, followed by spur roads south to Koilabas and north to Pyuthan, Rolpa, Dang Valley, Swargadwari and Salyan. This enabled ordinary Nepalis to reach the rest of the country in a day or two by inexpensive buses instead of by limited, expensive air service out of Dang airport or roundabout routes through India using trains and buses going east or west as well as several days on foot, so Rapti Zone's historic condition of isolation largely ended and then connection increased with the arrival of landline and cellular telephones, radio broadcasts and Internet.

The growing highway network replaced human porterage and greatly reduced transport costs. More goods were on sale locally, at lower prices. It also helped feed a diaspora sending Nepalese youth and fathers off to India, the Middle East, Europe and even the U.S. for employment and education. Another effect was to foster invidious comparison between increasing amenities of bazaar towns along the spur roads versus unchanged austerity in the hinterlands above that were mainly populated by Kham Magar janajatis. This added to historic grievances from government neglect and favoritism toward upper-caste hill Hindus, so Kham living in the highlands became ripe for recruitment by the Maobadi movement and the national government was virtually pushed out of Rolpa and Rukum during the 1996–2006 Nepalese Civil War.

== See also ==
- Development Regions of Nepal (Former)
- List of zones of Nepal (Former)
- List of districts of Nepal
- House of Tulsipur
