= Mid-Western Development Region, Nepal =

Coordinates: 28°36′N 81°38′E

Mid-Western Development Region मध्य-पश्चिमाञ्चल विकास क्षेत्र
- Former Development Region
- Interactive map of Mid-Western Development Region
- Country: Nepal
- Headquarters: Nepalgunj, Banke District, Bheri Zone

Area
  - Total: 42,378 km^{2} (16,362 sq mi)

Population (2011 Census)
  - Total: 3,546,682
  - Density: 84/km^{2} (220/sq mi)
- pop.note
- Time zone: UTC+5:45 (NPT)
- HDI: ▲0.627 (medium)

The Mid-Western Development Region (Nepali: मध्य-पश्चिमाञ्चल विकास क्षेत्र, Madhya-Pashchimānchal Bikās Kshetra) was one of the largest and formerly one of Nepal's five development regions. Westward from the Central region surrounding Kathmandu were the Western, Mid-Western and finally Far-Western regions. Counter-intuitively, Mid-Western lay west of Western.

It comprised three zones:

- Karnali
- Bheri
- Rapti

There were 15 districts in this region. The main rivers of this region were Karnali, Bheri, West Rapti River and Babai. Mt. Kanjiroba, Mt. Sisne and Mt. Patarasi were the main mountains of the Mid-Western Development Region. Banke National Park, Bardiya National Park, Shey Phoksundo National Park and Rara National Parks were some of the conservation areas of Mid-Western Development Region which were helping to attract more tourists. It occupied 29.2% of the total land of Nepal. It occupied an area of 42,378 km^{2}

Bhutias, Brahmin, Chhetri, Magar, Tharu, Awadhi and Thakuri were the main ethnicities. They were involved in different occupations like farming, animal husbandry, tourism, and service. Ghorahi, Nepalgunj, Birendranagar were the major trade centres of Mid-Western Development Region. There were various types of industries such as steel manufacturing and a garment industry. Different types of cultural sites such as Swargadwari lied in this development region. Peoples of this development region celebrated numbers of festivals like Dashain, Tihar, Lhosar etc. They grew different types of food such as rice, maize, pulse, wheat, and paddy. Banke and Bardiya National Park, Dhorpatan Hunting Reserve, Rara National Park, Rara Lake, Swargadwari and other sacred places were in this development region. In addition, the Gorkh, Kanti and Mukti Himal were also located in this region.
