= Development regions of Nepal =

Former type of subdivision of Nepal

Development Regions of Nepal
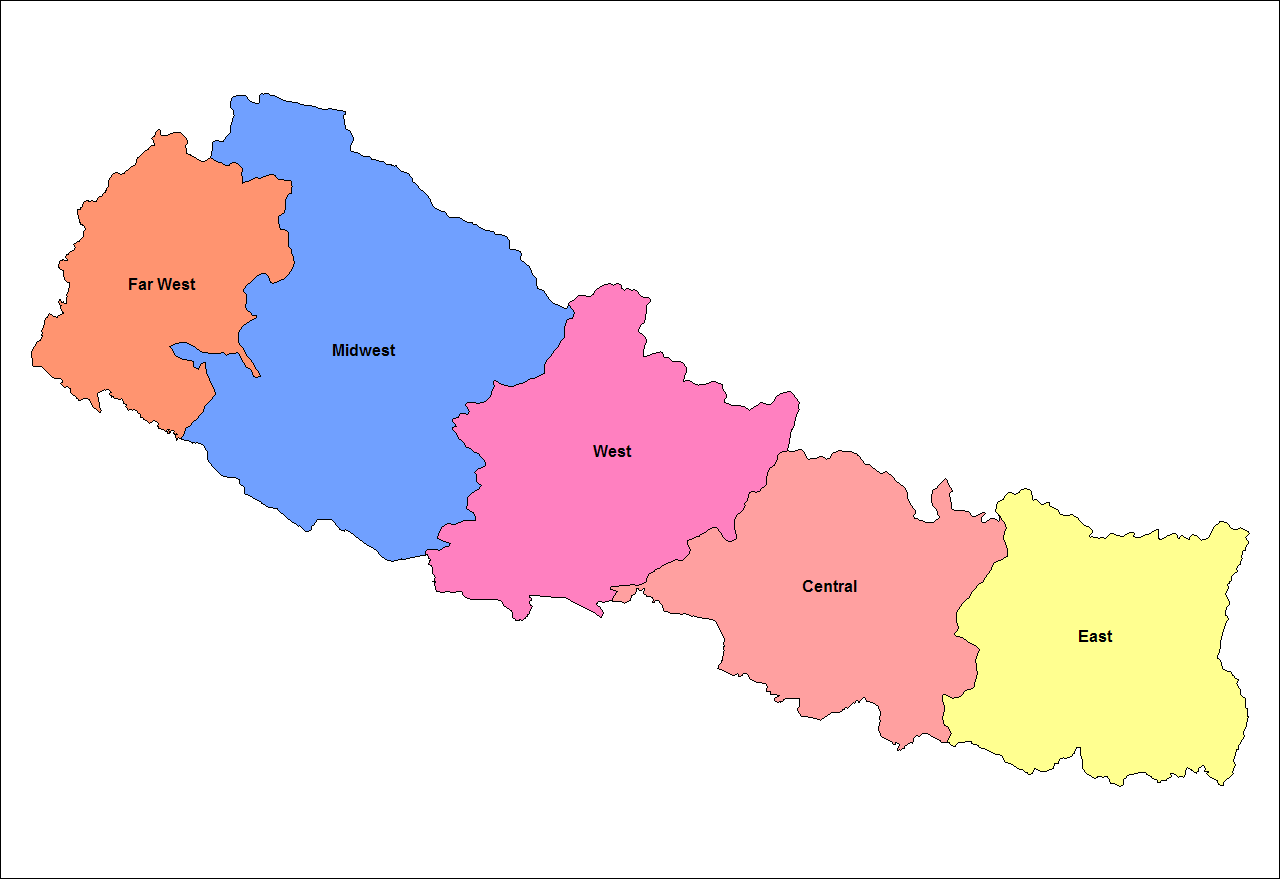
- Category: Federated state
- Location: Federal Democratic Republic of Nepal
- Number: 5 (as of 2037 B.S.)
- Government: Region government
- Subdivisions: Zones

Prior to the promulgation of a new constitution in 2015 after April 2015 Nepal earthquake, Nepal was divided into five development regions (Nepali: विकास क्षेत्र), 14 administrative zones (Nepali: अञ्चल) and 75 districts (Nepali: जिल्ला). The 14 administrative zones were grouped into five development regions. Each district is headed by a Chief District Officer (CDO) responsible for maintaining law and order and coordinating the work of field agencies of the various government ministries.

The five development regions of Nepal were (from east to west):

Development regions of Nepal
No.	English name	Nepali name	Zones	Districts (no.)	Headquarters	Population	Area (km^{2})
1	Eastern Development Region	पुर्वाञ्चल विकास क्षेत्र	Mechi; Koshi Sagarmatha	16	Dhankuta	5,811,555	28,456
2	Central Development Region	मध्यमाञ्चल विकास क्षेत्र	Janakpur; Bagmati; Narayani	19	Hetauda	9,656,985	27,410
3	Western Development Region	पश्चिमाञ्चल विकास क्षेत्र	Gandaki; Lumbini; Dhaulagiri	16	Pokhara	4,926,765	29,398
4	Mid-Western Development Region	मध्य पश्चिमाञ्चल विकास क्षेत्र	Rapti; Bheri; Karnali	15	Birendranagar	3,546,682	42,378
5	Far-Western Development Region	सुदुर पश्चिमाञ्चल विकास क्षेत्र	Seti; Mahakali	9	Dipayal	2,552,517	19,999.28

King Birendra divided the entire kingdom into four different regions in 2029 BS (1972):

- Eastern Development Region
- Central Development Region,
- Western Development Region
- Far-Western Development Region

The three regions were:

- Himalayan region, consisting of 21 districts
- Hilly region, consisting of 35 districts
- Terai region, consisting of 21 districts from east to west (Jhapa, Siraha, Saptari, Morang, Sunsari, Dhanusa, Mahottari, Sarlahi, Bara, Parsa, Rautahat, Chitwan, Kapilvastu, Nawalparasi, Rupandehi, Dang, Bake, Bardiya, Kailali, Kanchanpur)

To fill the gap between different parts of the nation by balanced or proportionate development. Eight years later, in 2037 B.S (1980), he further divided the nation adding one more separate development region, naming it the mid-western development region, taking two zones from Far Western Development region Seti and Mahakali.

== See also ==
- List of provinces of Nepal
- List of zones of Nepal (former)
- List of districts of Nepal
- List of village development committees of Nepal (former)
- ISO 3166-2:NP
