= Rolpa Municipality =

Rolpa Municipality रोल्पा नगरपालिका
- Municipality
- Location within Lumbini Province Location within Nepal
- Coordinates: 28°18′N 82°38′E
- Country: Nepal
- Province: Lumbini Province
- District: Rolpa
- No. of wards: 10
- Established: 2 December 2014
- Incorporated (VDC): Khumel, Jedwang, Kotgaun, Jankot, Hwama and Dhawang
- Incorporated (date): 2017

Government
  - Type: Mayor–council
  - Body: Rolpa Municipality
  - Mayor: Mr. Purna KC
  - Deputy Mayor: Mrs. Mankumari Ghartimagar

Area
  - Total: 270.42 km^{2} (104.41 sq mi)

Population (2011)
  - Total: 32,759
  - Density: 121.14/km^{2} (313.75/sq mi)
- Time zone: UTC+05:45 (NPT)
- Website: rolpamun.gov.np

Rolpa (Nepali: रोल्पा) (earlier: Liwang municipality) is a municipality located in Rolpa District of Lumbini Province of Nepal. It is one of the municipalities of Rolpa District. The municipality is surrounded by Sunchhahari and Swarnawati rural councils from the east, Tribeni & Madi rural councils from the West, Duikholi rural council from the North and Swarnawati & Runtigadhi from the South.

Total area of the municipality is 270.42 square kilometres (104.41 sq mi) and total population according to the 2011 Nepal census is 32,759 individuals. The municipality is divided into total 10 wards.

== Background ==
The municipality was established on 2 December 2014, when the government announced 61 more new municipalities. This new municipality was established merging the two then VDCs, e.g. Liwang and Khumel and it was named Libang then, later on 10 March 2017 more VDCs Kotgaun, Jankot, Hwama and Dhawang incorporated with this municipality and renamed it to Rolpa.

== Demographics ==
At the time of the 2011 Nepal census, Rolpa Municipality had a population of 34,347. Of these, 73.4% spoke Nepali, 18.4% Magar, 6.6% Kham, 1.0% Gurung, 0.2% Newari and 2.1% other languages as their first language.

In terms of ethnicity/caste, 43.7% were Magar, 27.4% Chhetri, 13.2% Kami, 4.9% Sanyasi/Dasnami, 4.4% Damai/Dholi, 2.6% Hill Brahmin, 1.5% Gurung, 0.9% Thakuri, 0.7% Newar and 0.7% others.

In terms of religion, 75.3% were Hindu, 22.8% Buddhist, 0.9% Prakriti, 0.7% Christian, 0.1% Muslim and 0.2% others.

== See also ==
- Rolpa District
- Lumbini Province
