= Sunilsmriti Rural Municipality =

Sunilsmriti (RM) सुनिलस्मृति गाउँपालिका
- Rural Municipality
- Location Sunilsmriti (RM) (Nepal)
- Coordinates: 28.24°N 82.72°E
- Country: Nepal
- Province: Lumbini
- District: Rolpa
- Wards: 7
- Established: 10 March 2017

Government
  - Type: Rural Council
  - Chairperson: Mr. Maniram Budhathoki
  - Vice-chairperson: Mrs. Mina Thapa
  - Term of office: (2017 - 2022)

Area
  - Total: 156.55 km^{2} (60.44 sq mi)

Population (2011)
  - Total: 28,213
  - Density: 180.22/km^{2} (466.76/sq mi)
- Time zone: UTC+5:45 (Nepal Standard Time)
- Headquarter: Mijhing
- Website: sunilsmritimun.gov.np

Sunilsmriti is a Rural municipality located within the Rolpa District of the Lumbini Province of Nepal. The rural municipality spans 156.55 square kilometres (60.44 sq mi) of area, with a total population of 28,213 according to a 2011 Nepal census.

On March 10, 2017, the Government of Nepal restructured the local level bodies into 753 new local level structures. The previous Mijhing, Aresh, Khungri, Ghodagaun, Tewang, Gajul and portion of Phagam VDCs were merged to form Sunilsmriti Rural Municipality. Sunilsmriti is divided into 7 wards, with Mijhing declared the administrative center of the rural municipality.

== Demographics ==
At the time of the 2011 Nepal census, Sunilsmriti Rural Municipality had a population of 28,213. Of these, 98.4% spoke Nepali, 0.5% Kham, 0.5% Magar, 0.2% Urdu, 0.1% Hindi, 0.1% Newar, and 0.1% other languages as their first language.

In terms of ethnicity/caste, 34.1% were Magar, 33.0% Chhetri, 13.6% Kami, 5.5% Sanyasi/Dasnami, 3.8% Hill Brahmin, 3.2% Damai/Dholi, 3.1% Thakuri, 1.7% Sarki, 0.5% Musalman and 1.5% others.

In terms of religion, 96.3% were Hindu, 2.7% Buddhist, 0.5% Muslim, 0.2% Christian and 0.3% others.

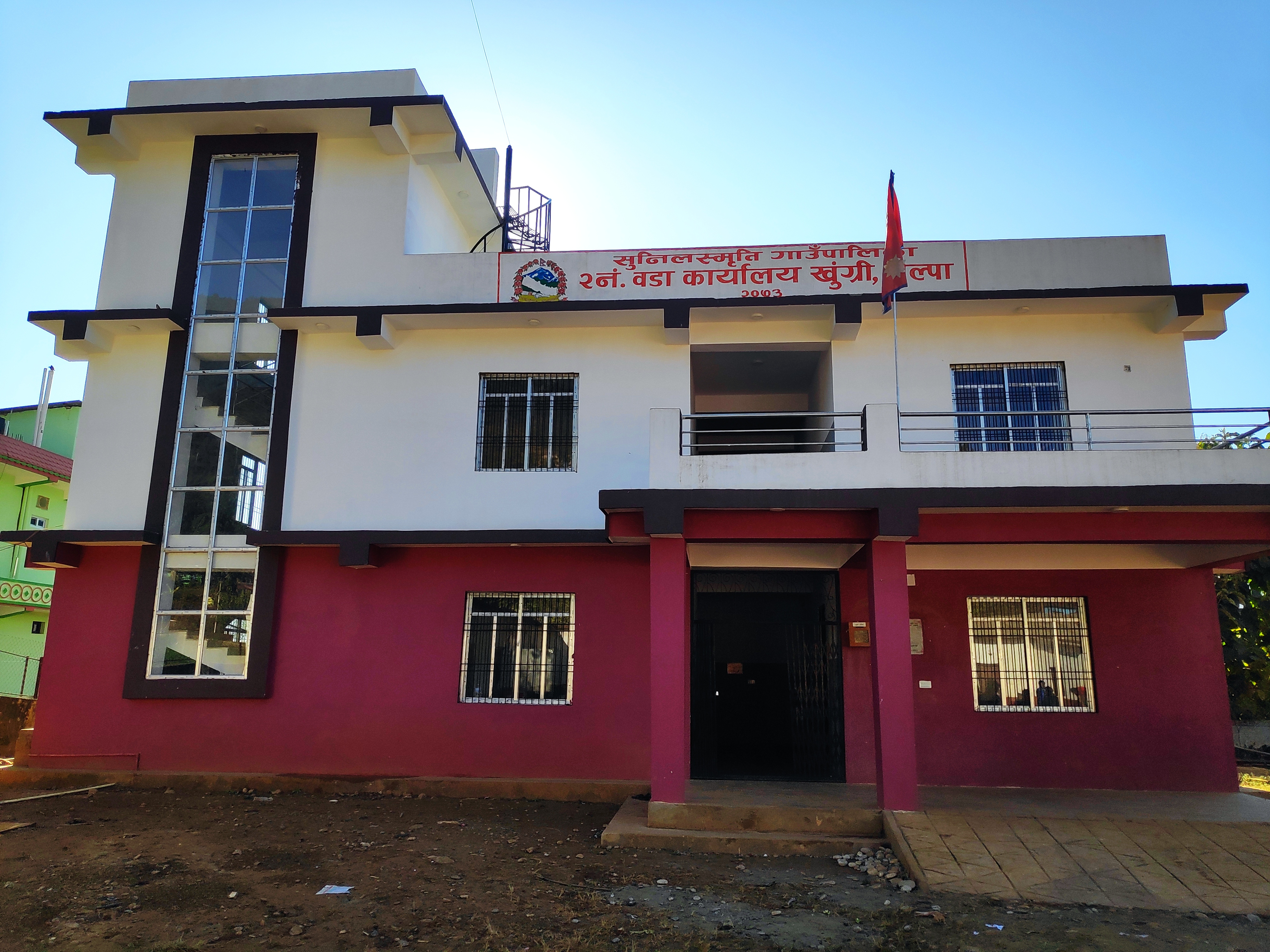
Sunilsmriti Rural Municipality Word No 2 Office
