= Sunchhahari Rural Municipality =

Sunchhahari Rural Municipality सुनछहरी गाउँपालिका
- Rural Municipality
- Location Sunchhahari Rural Municipality (Nepal)
- Coordinates: 28.34°N 82.78°E
- Country: Nepal
- Province: Lumbini
- District: Rolpa
- Wards: 7
- Established: 10 March 2017

Government
  - Type: Rural Council
  - Chairperson: Mr. Dhan Bahadur Pun Magar
  - Vice-chairperson: Mrs. Nankala Gharti Magar
  - Term of office: (2023 - 2027)

Area
  - Total: 277.62 km^{2} (107.19 sq mi)

Population (2021)
  - Total: 17,241
  - Density: 62.103/km^{2} (160.85/sq mi)
- Time zone: UTC+5:45 (Nepal Standard Time)
- Headquarter: Jaimakasala
- Website: sunchhaharimun.gov.np

Sunchhahari is a Rural municipality located within the Rolpa District of the Lumbini Province of Nepal. The rural municipality spans 277.62 square kilometres (107.19 sq mi) of area, with a total population of 17,241 according to a 2021 Nepal census.

On March 10, 2017, the Government of Nepal restructured the local level bodies into 753 new local level structures. The previous Jaimakasala, Jailwang, Gam, Siuri, Seram and portion of Phagam VDCs were merged to form Sunchhahari Rural Municipality. Sunchhahari is divided into 7 wards, with Jaimakasala declared the administrative center of the rural municipality.

Sunchhahari Rural Municipality is named after Sunchhahari Waterfall, the first rural municipality chairman is Aas Bahadur Pun Magar, and the current chairman is Dhan Bahadur Pun Magar.

== Geographical ==
Sunchhahari Rural Municipality is located between Thabang Rural Municipality to the north, Sisne Rural Municipality to the south, Sunil Smriti Rural Municipality to the west, and Lungri Rural Municipality to the east.

== Caste, Religion & Language ==
Sunchhahari Rural Municipality is home to Magar, Dalit, Gurung, Thakali, Kshetri, Newar and Bahun people, while 70% of the population is Magar. Since Magar is the majority in Sunchhahari Rural Municipality, the number of people who follow nature religion is significant. Magar Kham language is spoken by the Magars here.

== Tourism ==
Sunchhahari Rural Municipality is a rural municipality with tourism potential. The main tourist attractions in this rural municipality include Jelbang Village, Sunchhahari Water Falls, Jaljala, Bajudhuri, Bibang Daha, Tilachan Daha, Rabang, and Kothibhir.
