= Runtigadhi Rural Municipality =

Runtigadhi (RM) रुन्टीगढी गाउँपालिका
- Rural Municipality
- Location Runtigadhi (RM) (Nepal)
- Coordinates: 28.21°N 82.45°E
- Country: Nepal
- Province: Lumbini
- District: Rolpa
- Wards: 9
- Established: 10 March 2017

Government
  - Type: Rural Council
  - Chairperson: Janak Pun (NC)
  - Vice-chairperson: Sarita KC (NC)

Area
  - Total: 232.69 km^{2} (89.84 sq mi)

Population (2011)
  - Total: 27,929
  - Density: 120.03/km^{2} (310.87/sq mi)
- Time zone: UTC+5:45 (Nepal Standard Time)
- Headquarter: Jhenam
- Website: runtigadhimun.gov.np

Runtigadhi is a Rural municipality located within the Rolpa District of the Lumbini Province of Nepal. The rural municipality spans 232.69 square kilometres (89.84 sq mi) of area, with a total population of 27,929 according to a 2011 Nepal census.

On March 10, 2017, the Government of Nepal restructured the local level bodies into 753 new local level structures. The previous Jhenam, Sakhi, Jauli Pokhari, Masina, Dubring, portion of Jedwang and Dubidanda VDCs were merged to form Runtigadhi Rural Municipality. Runtigadhi is divided into 9 wards, with Jhenam declared the administrative center of the rural municipality.

== Demographics ==
At the time of the 2011 Nepal census, Runtigadhi Rural Municipality had a population of 28,517. Of these, 98.6% spoke Nepali, 1.3% Magar and 0.1% Hindi as their first language.

In terms of ethnicity/caste, 43.0% were Magar, 29.7% Chhetri, 13.4% Kami, 4.4% Damai/Dholi, 3.9% Sanyasi/Dasnami, 3.1% Sarki, 1.3% Thakuri, 0.3% Hill Brahmin, 0.2% other Dalit and 0.7% others.

In terms of religion, 94.8% were Hindu, 4.1% Christian, 0.4% Buddhist and 0.7% others.
