= Paribartan Rural Municipality =

Paribartan (RM) परिवर्तन गाउँपालिका
- Rural Municipality
- Location Paribartan (RM) (Nepal)
- Coordinates: 28.50°N 82.57°E
- Country: Nepal
- Province: Lumbini
- District: Rolpa
- Wards: 6
- Established: 10 March 2017

Government
  - Type: Rural Council
  - Chairperson: Mr. Suk bahadur budhamagar
  - Vice-chairperson: Mrs. kaladebi khatreni
  - Term of office: (2022 - 2027)

Area
  - Total: 163.01 km^{2} (62.94 sq mi)

Population (2021)
  - Total: 22,001
  - Density: 134.97/km^{2} (349.56/sq mi)
- Time zone: UTC+5:45 (Nepal Standard Time)
- Headquarter: putalachaur rangkot
- Website: paribartanmun.gov.np

Paribartan is a Rural municipality located within the Rolpa District of the Lumbini Province of Nepal. The rural municipality spans 163.01 square kilometres (62.94 sq mi) of area, with a total population of 20,778 according to a 2011 Nepal census.

On March 10, 2017, the Government of Nepal restructured the local level bodies into 753 new local level structures. The previous Kureli, Rangsi, Rangkot, Iriwang and Pachhawang VDCs were merged to form Paribartan Rural Municipality. Paribartan is divided into 6 wards, with Rangkot declared the administrative center of the rural municipality.

This rural municipality was named Duikholi Rural Municipality during establishment but later renamed as Paribartan.

== Demographics ==
At the time of the 2011 Nepal census, Paribartan Rural Municipality had a population of 20,778. Of these, 89.8% spoke Nepali, 9.9% Magar, 0.2% Kham and 0.1% Maithili as their first language.

In terms of ethnicity/caste, 50.5% were Magar, 35.7% Chhetri, 8.1% Kami, 3.3% Damai/Dholi, 1.1% Thakuri, 0.4% Badi, 0.3% Hill Brahmin, 0.3% Sanyasi/Dasnami, 0.2% Newar and 0.1% others.

In terms of religion, 81.8% were Hindu, 16.5% Buddhist, 1.5% Christian, 0.1% Prakriti and 0.1% others.
