= Lungri Rural Municipality =

Lungri (RM) लुङ्ग्री गाउँपालिका
- Rural Municipality
- Location Lungri (RM) (Nepal)
- Coordinates: 28.27°N 82.77°E
- Country: Nepal
- Province: Lumbini
- District: Rolpa
- Wards: 7
- Established: 10 March 2017

Government
  - Type: Rural Council
  - Chairperson: Mr. Bharat Kumar Thapa
  - Vice-chairperson: Mrs. Bhimkala Budhathoki Chhetri
  - Term of office: (2017 - 2022)

Area
  - Total: 135.23 km^{2} (52.21 sq mi)

Population (2011)
  - Total: 23,631
  - Density: 174.75/km^{2} (452.59/sq mi)
- Time zone: UTC+5:45 (Nepal Standard Time)
- Headquarter: Wadachaur
- Website: lungrimun.gov.np

Lungri is a Rural municipality located within the Rolpa District of the Lumbini Province of Nepal. The rural municipality spans 135.23 square kilometres (52.21 sq mi) of area, with a total population of 23,631 according to a 2011 Nepal census.

On March 10, 2017, the Government of Nepal restructured the local level bodies into 753 new local level structures. The previous Wadachaur, Pang, Sirpa, Harjang and Gumchal VDCs were merged to form Lungri Rural Municipality. Lungri is divided into 7 wards, with Wadachaur declared the administrative center of the rural municipality.

== Demographics ==
At the time of the 2011 Nepal census, Lungri Rural Municipality had a population of 23,631. Of these, 99.4% spoke Nepali, 0.4% Gurung and 0.2% other languages as their first language.

In terms of ethnicity/caste, 46.7% were Chhetri, 31.6% Magar, 11.9% Kami, 3.1% other Dalit, 2.0% Damai/Dholi, 1.9% Sanyasi/Dasnami, 1.5% Gurung, 0.5% Hill Brahmin, 0.3% Majhi and 0.5% others.

In terms of religion, 96.6% were Hindu, 2.1% Buddhist, 1.2% Prakriti and 0.1% Christian and .
