= Triveni Rural Municipality, Rolpa =

Triveni (RM) त्रिवेणी गाउँपालिका
- Rural Municipality
- Location Triveni (RM) (Nepal)
- Coordinates: 28.33°N 82.43°E
- Country: Nepal
- Province: Lumbini
- District: Rolpa
- Wards: 7
- Established: 10 March 2017

Government
  - Type: Rural Council
  - Chairperson: Karna Bahadur Bantha Magar CPN (UML)
  - Vice-chairperson: Lekh Mani Dangi NC
  - Term of office: (2017 - 2022)

Area
  - Total: 205.39 km^{2} (79.30 sq mi)

Population (2011)
  - Total: 22,957
  - Density: 111.77/km^{2} (289.49/sq mi)
- Time zone: UTC+5:45 (Nepal Standard Time)
- Headquarter: Jungar
- Website: trivenimunrolpa.gov.np

Triveni is a Rural municipality located within the Rolpa District of the Lumbini Province of Nepal. The rural municipality spans 205.39 square kilometres (79.30 sq mi) of area, with a total population of 22,957 according to a 2011 Nepal census.

On March 10, 2017, the Government of Nepal restructured the local level bodies into 753 new local level structures. The previous Kareti, Nuwagaun, Jungar, Budagaun and Gairigaun VDCs were merged to form Triveni Rural Municipality. Triveni is divided into 7 wards, with Jungar declared the administrative center of the rural municipality.

== Demographics ==
At the time of the 2011 Nepal census, Triveni Rural Municipality had a population of 24,110. Of these, 99.8% spoke Nepali, 0.1% Magar and 0.1% other languages as their first language.

In terms of ethnicity/caste, 41.0% were Magar, 35.9% Chhetri, 15.2% Kami, 5.2% Damai/Dholi, 1.1% Sanyasi/Dasnami, 0.4% Thakuri, 0.4% Sarki, 0.3% Hill Brahmin, 0.2% Badi and 0.3% others.

In terms of religion, 88.7% were Hindu, 8.3% Buddhist, 2.4% Christian and 0.6% others.
