= Madi Rural Municipality, Rolpa =

Madi (RM), Rolpa माडी गाउँपालिका, रोल्पा
- Rural Municipality
- Location Madi (RM), Rolpa (Nepal)
- Coordinates: 28.21°N 82.27°E
- Country: Nepal
- Province: Lumbini
- District: Rolpa
- Wards: 6
- Established: 10 March 2017

Government
  - Type: Rural Council
  - Chairperson: Mr. Amar Singh Gharti Magar (Mitramani)
  - Vice-chairperson: Mrs. Jayapuri Gharti Magar (Junmaya)
  - Term of office: (2022- Present)

Area
  - Total: 129.05 km^{2} (49.83 sq mi)

Population (2021)
  - Total: 18,056
  - Density: 139.91/km^{2} (362.38/sq mi)
- Time zone: UTC+5:45 (Nepal Standard Time)
- Headquarter: Gharti Gaun
- Website: madimunrolpa.gov.np

Madi is a Rural municipality located within the Rolpa District of the Lumbini Province of Nepal. The rural municipality spans 129.05 square kilometres (49.83 sq mi) of area, with a total population of 18,056 according to a 2021 Nepal census.

On March 10, 2017, the Government of Nepal restructured the local level bodies into 753 new local level structures. The previous Gharti Gaun, Talawang, Karchawang (excluding some portion), portion of Wot and Bhawang VDCs were merged to form Madi Rural Municipality. Madi is divided into 6 wards, with Gharti Gaun declared the administrative center of the rural municipality.

== Demographics ==
At the time of the 2021 Nepal census, Madi Rural Municipality had a population of 18,056. Of these, 90.6% spoke Nepali, 9.0% Magar and 0.4% other languages as their first language.

In terms of ethnicity/caste, 54.5% were Magar, 27.8% Chhetri, 12.2% Kami, 4.6% Damai/Dholi, 0.3% Thakuri, 0.3% other Dalit, 0.2% Hill Brahmin and 0.1% Musalman.

In terms of religion, 70.1% were Hindu, 22.1% Buddhist, 4.5% Christian, 1.1% Prakriti, 0.1% Muslim and 2.1% others.
