= Gangadev Rural Municipality =

Gangadev (RM) गङ्गादेव गाउँपालिका
- Rural Municipality
- Location Gangadev (RM) (Nepal)
- Coordinates: 28.41°N 82.40°E
- Country: Nepal
- Province: Lumbini
- District: Rolpa
- Wards: 7
- Established: 10 March 2017

Government
  - Type: Rural Council
  - Chairperson: Hari Bahadur Pun Magar (NC)
  - Deputy chairperson: Amrita KC Wali (NC)

Area
  - Total: 124.38 km^{2} (48.02 sq mi)

Population (2011)
  - Total: 20,009
  - Density: 160.87/km^{2} (416.65/sq mi)
- Time zone: UTC+5:45 (Nepal Standard Time)
- Headquarter: Sanadanda, Jinawang
- Website: gangadevmun.gov.np

Gangadev is a Rural municipality located within the Rolpa District of the Lumbini Province of Nepal. The rural municipality spans 124.38 square kilometres (48.02 sq mi) of area, with a total population of 20,009 according to a 2011 Nepal census.

On March 10, 2017, the Government of Nepal restructured the local level bodies into 753 new local level structures. The previous Jinawang, Rank, Pakhapani and portion of Wot VDCs were merged to form Gangadev Rural Municipality. Gangadev is divided into 7 wards, with Jinawang declared the administrative center of the rural municipality.

== Demographics ==
At the time of the 2011 Nepal census, Gangadev Rural Municipality had a population of 20,009. Of these, 99.1% spoke Nepali, 0.8% Magar and 0.1% other languages as their first language.

In terms of ethnicity/caste, 76.6% were Chhetri, 11.5% Magar, 7.2% Kami, 2.7% Damai/Dholi, 0.7% Thakuri, 0.5% Sarki, 0.4% Hill Brahmin, 0.2% Gurung, 0.1% Sanyasi/Dasnami and 0.1% others.

In terms of religion, 98.6% were Hindu, 0.7% Christian, 0.5% Buddhist and 0.2% others.
