= Bhume Naach =

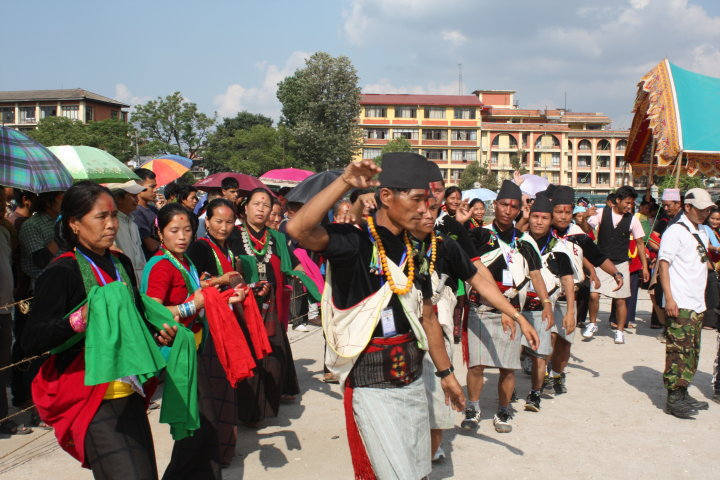
- Also called: Bal Puja
- Observed by: Kham Magar people
- Type: Cultural

Bhume Naach (also known as Bal puja, Namka Parva, Lokabangey, Jhyamkri rw Balka and Bulku) is one of the festivals celebrated by the Kham Magar people from Lumbini province of Nepal. The term Bhume means 'Earth' and Naach means 'dance' in the Nepali language. The Kham people practice a religion that worships the land (bhumi puja), water sprouts (shim), forests (ban puja) and weather, asking for better crop yields and cattle. The May Festival is the main dance performed by the Magars, especially in eastern Rukum and Rolpa. This dance is performed in all parts of Bhume Rural Municipality and Putha Uttarganga Rural Municipality in eastern Rukum, and is also performed in Thabang and Jelbang in Rolpa. This dance is a specialty dance performed in major villages where Parbatey Kham Magar is spoken.

Bhume Naach is a folk dance which is performed around a fire to worship the Earth. The Kham people believe that the Earth is God. Earth is considered to be the mother and protector which provides shelter, food and sustenance for everyone. To make the Earth happy, people perform the dance from mid-May through mid-June. The main celebration takes place during the first week of June.

== About Bhume Naach ==
Bhume dance is famous in Athara Magarat (eighteen Magar communities) of the western region of the country. It is originally traditional dance of the Magar communities of this region. Magars worship the land as their primal force because they are nature worshiper and perform Bhume dance in reverence to nature as it is also associated with the worship of nature. Bhume dance is performed remembering nature and ancestors paying high reverence to the land and the deity of the land.

Bhume dance is performed on the first and second of Asar (June). Sometimes, it is extended to five days, from the first day to the fifth day of the same month. In this dance, the earth or nature is considered supreme above all. With the belief that it is due to the earth that we are surviving the dancers bow to the land and begin the dance with the prayer to nature. Both men and women of all age groups participate in this dance. Even visitors who express a desire to perform the dance are warmly welcomed during this dance.

During the dance, the performers form a circle. The musical instruments that include flute, madal, paijam, chhelam and dundi (horn and trumpet) are played in the center of the circle. When the players start playing musical instruments in harmony and beats, the male dancers inside the circle and the female dancers outside the circle start dancing to the beats and rhythm of the music. Though songs are not sung in Bhume dance, the dance represents the memory of ancestors and conveys the expression of different aspects of life connected to agricultural practices. When the rhythm and beats of the music change, so does the dance. Bhume dance is believed to consist of twenty two longer prevalent in their original state, however they are still performed in twenty-two tunes of folk songs of the recent time. Although there was a hearsay that human sacrifice used to be made before starting Bhume dance, nobody could make sure that it was in practice in reality.

== Celebration ==
During the celebration of Bhume Naach young boys and girls are selected by the leader of the village and sent to a hill or mountain to collect water, soil, and a colorful assortment of flowers deemed holy by the villagers. The boys carry colorful flags and a patho (baby goat/kid); the girls carry holy water and assorted food. After collecting water, soil and flowers, three flags are attached to a huge timber to fly on the mountaintop. After spending fifteen days on the hills or mountains, the children then worship the Earth, sacrifice the patho, and return to the village on the first day in June, which is also the first day of the celebration.

Upon their return, the young boys and girls tie three bright colorful flags on a timber pole and place it upright on the ground. They enjoy singing, dancing and playing a modal (a local musical instrument), and drums. The villagers celebrate and welcome the children by playing drums and another local instrument called the senate. The celebrants then take another patho to the river to wash prior to the sacrifice. Following the sacrifice, the goat, believed to have gone to paradise, is taken to the center of the village. Its neck is adorned with pieces of cloth of a red, yellow, green, and white color. These symbolize the Earth (mother of this indigenous community), happiness, peace, and love. The girls adorn themselves with clothes of the same colors upon their shoulders and around their necks, while performing songs and dances.

== The Patho ==
During the celebration, a boy wearing a white gown pulls a patho or lamb, while other boys follow him, tapping the patho gently with a stick to make it walk around the village. Women and girls stand on the side of the road in a queue holding Nanglo a local handicraft made of bamboo containing ash, corn, maize, millet, coin, colorful pieces of cloths or coal to pour over the patho.

Near the end of the ritual, another boy comes to hold a patho while the Damais (occupational caste) plays drums loudly. The two boys have to run as fast as they can while the other boys tap the patho to make it run as well. While running, if anyone falls down, it is considered to be a bad omen, which can be related to death. If a person falls down he may become ill or die. Their relatives may have similarly bad luck within a year.

If no one falls down, it is considered to be a good omen for the village. Finally, the participants go to the river and take the patho to a ritual place used to worship the land. The patho is sacrificed at the river, its blood is smeared onto colorful pieces of cloths which are attached on a tall pole and left to flutter on a rock. Afterwards, the villagers cook a variety of food, provide various drinks, eat together, and exchange gifts while wishing each other well. After this event, they gather at the main ground where they perform Balpuja. This is a ritual where a circle of people is formed and the crowd sings a song. Every member of the village is required to participate.

== A Ritual Dance ==
The main dance of Bhume Naach, requires that the village boys dance in the center of a circle surrounded by dancing girls who wear beautiful clothing, jewelry, and flowers. The girls distribute their flowers to show respect. The children dance the whole day completing twenty-two steps per song and are required to complete all 22 steps of the dance within the day. The Balpuja conveys a message to the God/Earth. Since the Kham consider Earth as the main source of love and protection, the Earth has to be happy in order to get everything they need, such as food, water, air, light and shelter. The outer circle of girls represents the mother and protector for their own community. Decisions that are made by the family and by the community are heavily influenced by the Kham women. This annual celebration is concluded by people singing sad songs together. Participants weep bitterly and depart from the gathering with good wishes and blessings from their elders.

The process of celebrating this traditional Bhume Naach is a symbolic demonstration of the relationship of Kham people to nature rather than a god. The Bhume Naach highlights and celebrates the fact that without Earth there is no life.
