= Jelbang =

Village development committee in Lumbini Province, Nepal

Jelbang जेलबाङ लोहासुर
- Sunchhahari Rural Municipality ward no. 7
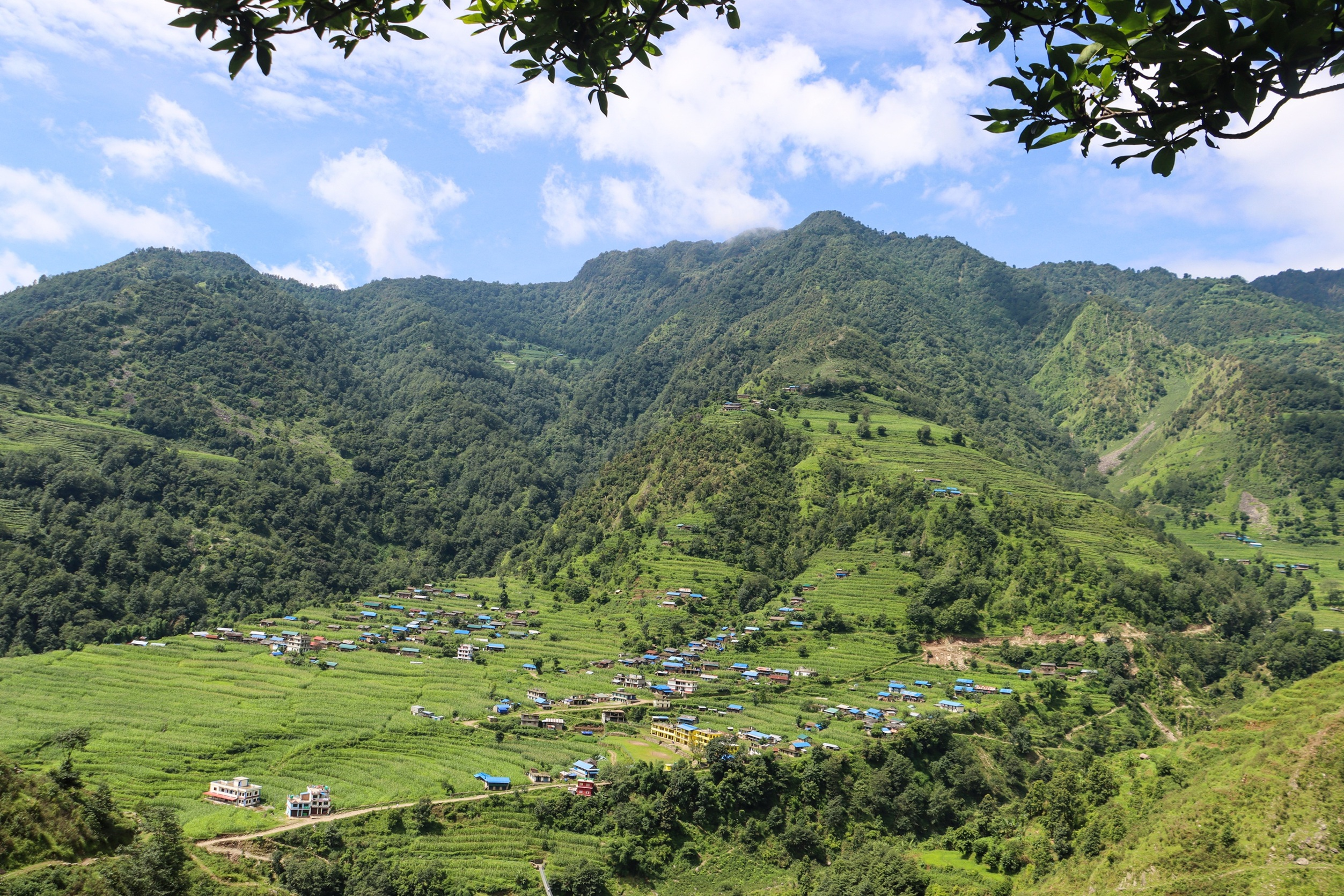

- Location in Lumbini Province Jelbang (Nepal)
- Coordinates: 28.40°N 82.74°E
- Country: Nepal
- Zone: Lumbini Province

Population (2021)
  - Total: 3,037
- Time zone: UTC+5:45 (Nepal Time)
- Postal code: 22100

Jelbang is a village in Rolpa District of the Lumbini Province, and is situated at the Southern Part of the Jaljala Hill Rolpa. 2021 Nepal census it had a population of 3037 people living in 568 individual households. The town is populated by Magars.

== History ==
=== Nepalese Civil War ===
Jelbang was used by Maoist rebels during the Nepalese Civil War as a military base where they trained recruits. In 2003, government forces sent in helicopters which heavily bombed Jelbang, killing large amounts of people. At least 68 people from Jelbang died during the war, including 30 who died in the village itself. Almost all died at the hands of the police or military This was the highest amount of killings during the war, and are now known as the Jelbang Killings. In commemoration of the killings, Jelbang has been described as a "Model Peace Village" and a "Village of Martyrs".

== Demographics ==
According to the National Census 2021, the population of Jelbang is 3037 of which 1577 are females and 1460 are males and there are 600 households. The number of households with access to electricity is 100% and the number of households with access to clean drinking water is also 100%.

== Caste ==
Population of Jelbang 80% of Magar community remaining 20% are Dalits. Within the Magar caste the clans Budha Magar, Roka Magar, Pun Magar and Gharti Magar are inhabited. The Dalit community includes the clans Nepali, Sunar, BishowKarma., Kami, and Damai.

== Language ==
In Jelbang 99% of the population speaks Magar Kham due to the Magar community being in the majority, Dalit's also speak Magar Kham.

== Religion ==
In Jelbang 91% of the population believes Prakriti religion while the remaining 9% of the population believes religion of Hindu.

== Cultural ==
Jelbang itself is a historical village in which the Magar community has its own identity and traditional system. The culture of the Magar community from birth to marriage to death and after death to the burial remains an integral heritage. Bhume Nach, Singaru Nach, Mayur Nach and Paeseru Nach are more cultural vibes to heart. The custom of living in a hut is an ancient culture.

== Bhume Naach Worship and Fair ==
Nature worship is one of the major aspects of the culture and religion of Kham Magar Communities. They believe that we must be grateful and loyal to the nature and the earth as they are the main source of our survival and existence. The tradition of worshipping and honoring nature has been prevalent in the Kham Magar Community since ancient times. Although nature worship is not limited to the Magar Community alone, various other ethnic groups also practice it is well.

This ritual is performed to avoid adverse situations in human life and to protect crops and livestock from natural calamities like landslides and floods during rainy season and other ailments. Bhume worship is conducted on the first of Asar every year. Although there is no temple of land deity, there is a shrine at the foot of a big tree near the village. On the morning of the first of Asar, the shrine is cleaned, sanctified and adorned with incense, dhaja (sacred cloth straps), akshata, phulpati (flowers) and Bhume worship is conducted by offering the sacrifices of roosters. Although Budha Magar and Roka Magar, who had at first settled in this area, become the priests of Bhume worship, it is performed with the participation of people from all castes and clans as well. Pancha Puja (worship) is performed by playing musical instruments at the top of the village act of driving away the ghosts and evil spirits at every house by thrashing them with a club or a bat made of sumac plant, while the elders ward off the evils with straw smoke and ashes.

After these two worship ceremonies are over, a fair starts at the afternoon of the same day on the field, a little further from the village to the north. This fair becomes grand since people from nearby villages also come to attend and enjoy the fair, with their cultural identities. Food items and dances are the main attractions of the fair. Distinctive traditional cultural dances and songs are performed along with modern cultural programs. Even though the Bhume worship ends in one day, the Bhume fair continues for two to three days. The Bhume worship and fair of Jelbang have been established as major religious and cultural heritages of this region.

=== Postwar Nepal ===
In 2020, an Article in Nagarik reported that a defunct Mine in Jelbang would be converted into a Museum. Local Authorities hope it may boost Tourism in Jelbang.
