= Thawang =

Thabang थबाङ
- Village development committee
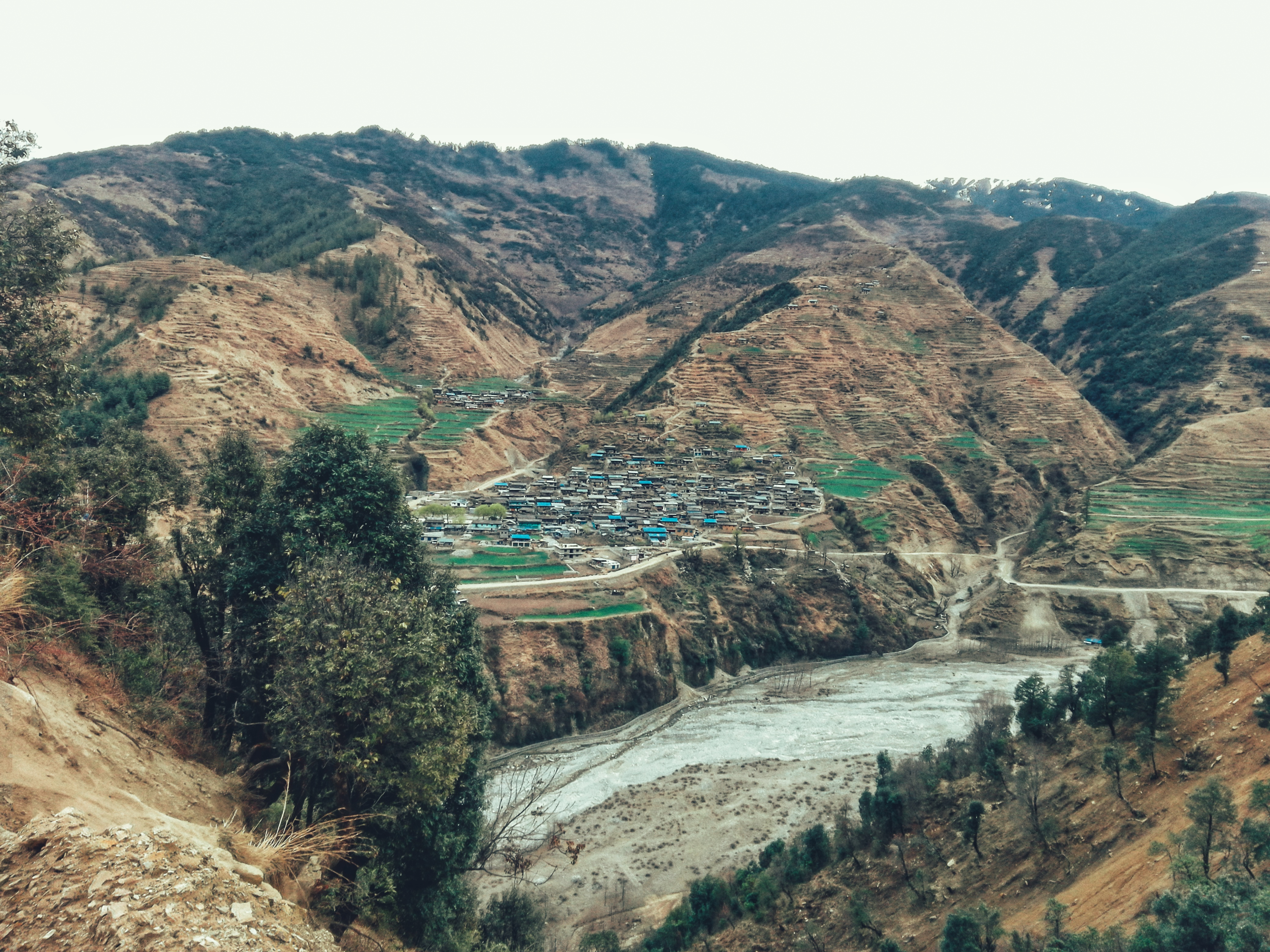
- Thawang Village

- Location in Nepal
- Coordinates: 28.48°N 82.72°E
- Country: Nepal
- Province: Lumbini Province
- District: Rolpa District

Population (2021)
  - Total: 4,522
- Time zone: UTC+5:45 (Nepal Time)

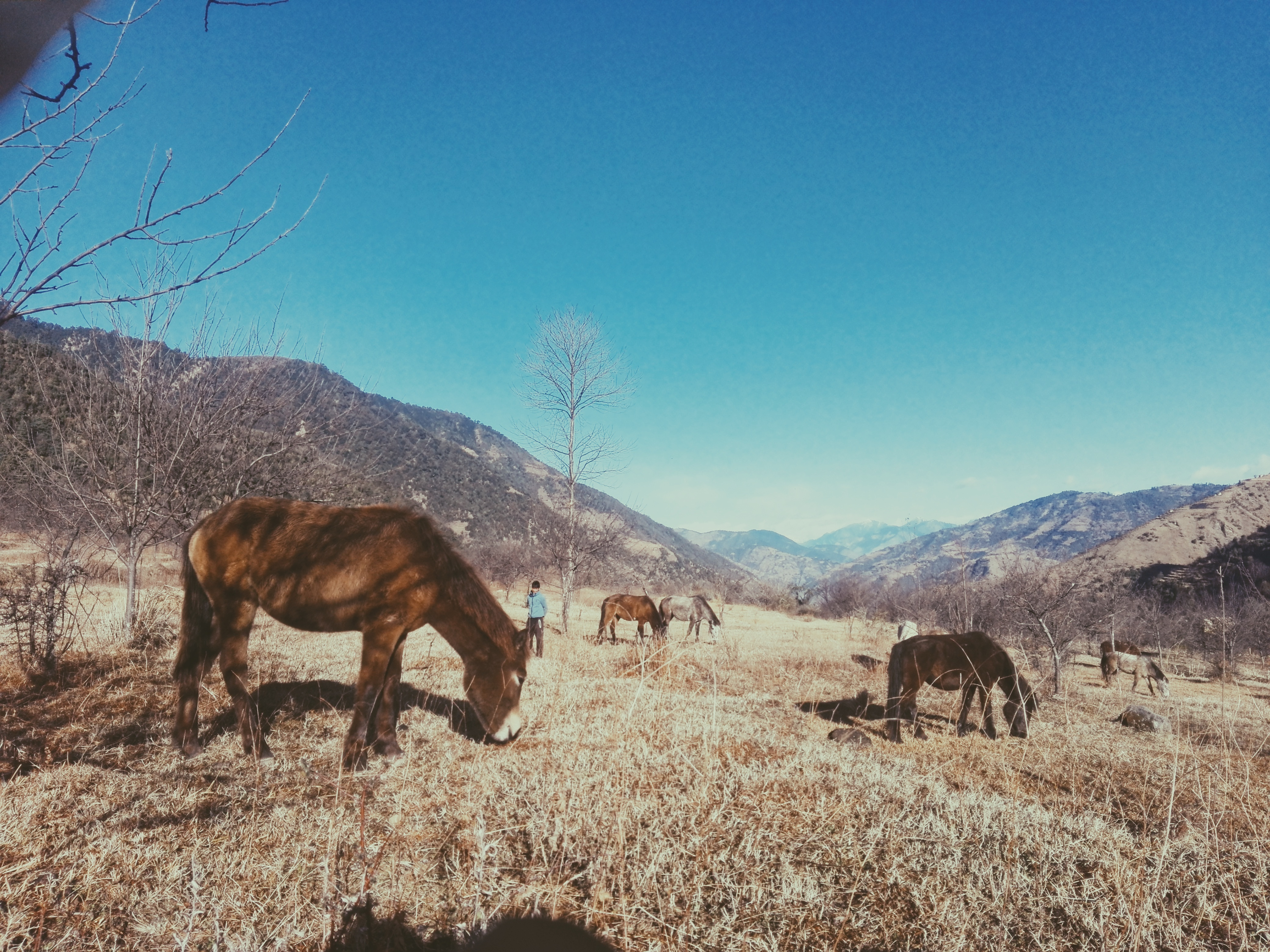
Horse Grazing in Thabang Rolpa Pasture and Mountain view

Thawang (Nepali: थबाङ) is a village development committee in Rolpa District in the Lumbini Province of western Nepal. At the time of the 2021 Nepal census it had a population of 4522 people living in 853 individual households. It is now in Thabang Rural Municipality Ward No. 2 and 3. This is a beautiful settlement of Nepal. This settlement has a majority of Magar and is the main settlement area of Kham speakers. From this place, you can go to Jaljala, a famous and beautiful place in Nepal. It was one of the first villages to rise up against the monarchy in the Nepalese Civil War and subsequently the site of a massacre perpetrated by the Royal Nepali Army in 2002.
