= Hari Budha Magar =

Nepalese mountaineer (born 1979)

Hari Budha Magar MBE
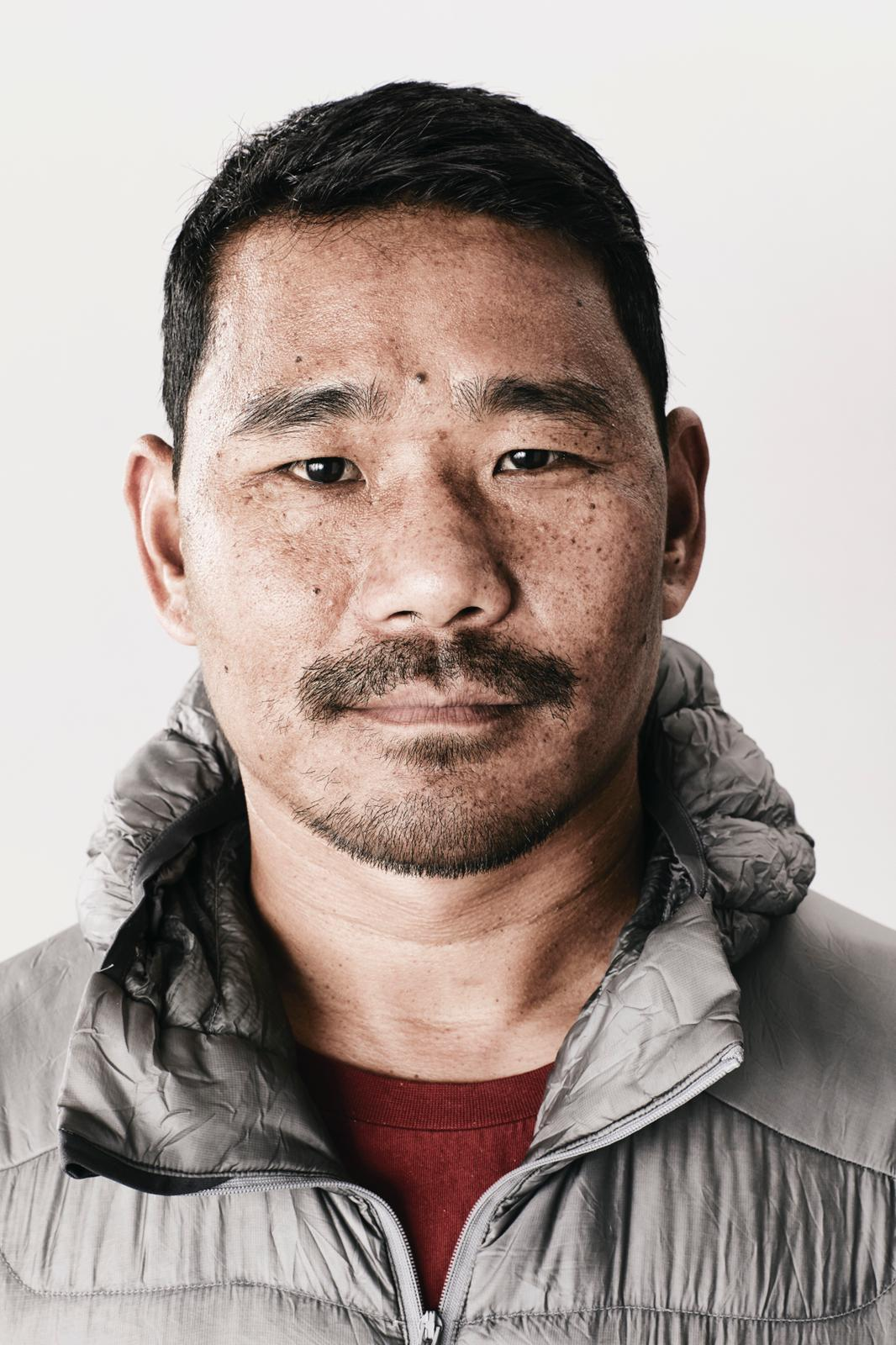

Personal information
- Born: 1979 (age 46–47) Mirul, Rolpa District, Nepal
- Occupations: Mountaineer, Motivational speaker, Disability Campaigner
- Spouse: Married
- Website: www.haribudhamagar.com

Hari Budha Magar MBE is a Nepalese double above-knee amputee and record-breaking mountaineer. On 6th January 2026, he became the first double amputee to complete the Seven Summit challenge after climbing Mount Vinson, Antarctica’s tallest mountain. In 2017, he became the first double above-knee amputee (DAK) to summit a mountain taller than 6,000m (Mera Peak, 6,476m). Then, on May 19, 2023, he achieved the record of being the first ever double above-knee amputee to summit the world's tallest mountain, Mount Everest (8,848m).

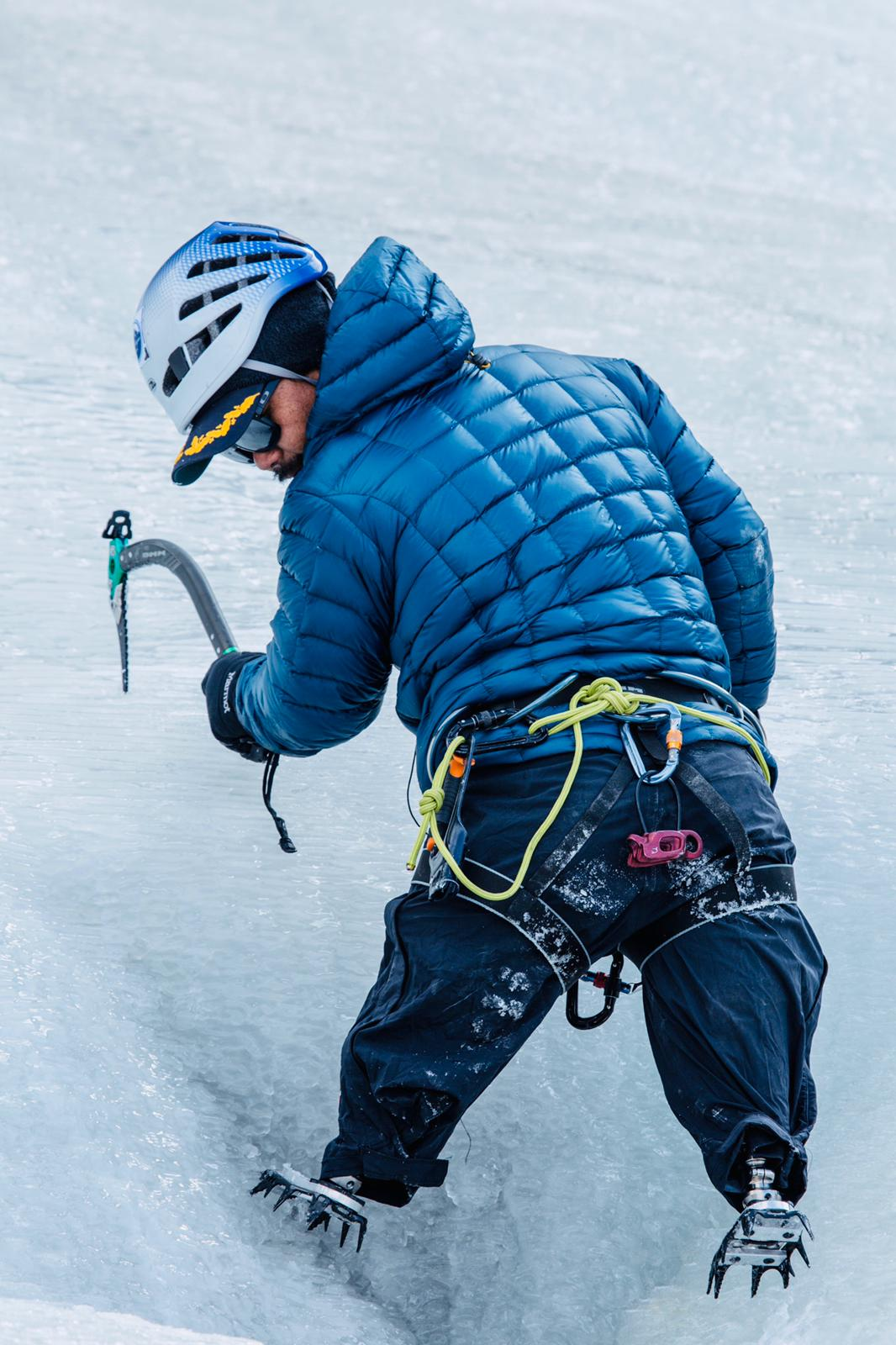
Magar ice climbing in Nepal. (Photo: Shanta Nepali)

== Early life ==
Magar was born in 1979 in a village in the foothills of the Himalayas in Nepal. He was born in a cow-shed at an altitude of 2,500m in a remote part of Western Nepal. He grew up in Mirul, in the Rolpa District of the Himalayas in Nepal. As a child, he had to walk 45 minutes each day to go to school and back, barefoot; at school, there were no pens or paper so he learnt to write with chalk stone on a wooden plank. He was forced to get married at the age of 11. During his teenage years, he was surrounded by the Nepalese Civil War where more than 17,000 people were killed over a period of 10 years.

== Military career ==
Magar joined the British Army via the Royal Gurkha Rifles when he was 19. He served across five continents, doing training and operations for the British Army, his roles included Combat Medic, Sniper, and Covert Surveillance, amongst other things.

=== Injury and recovery ===
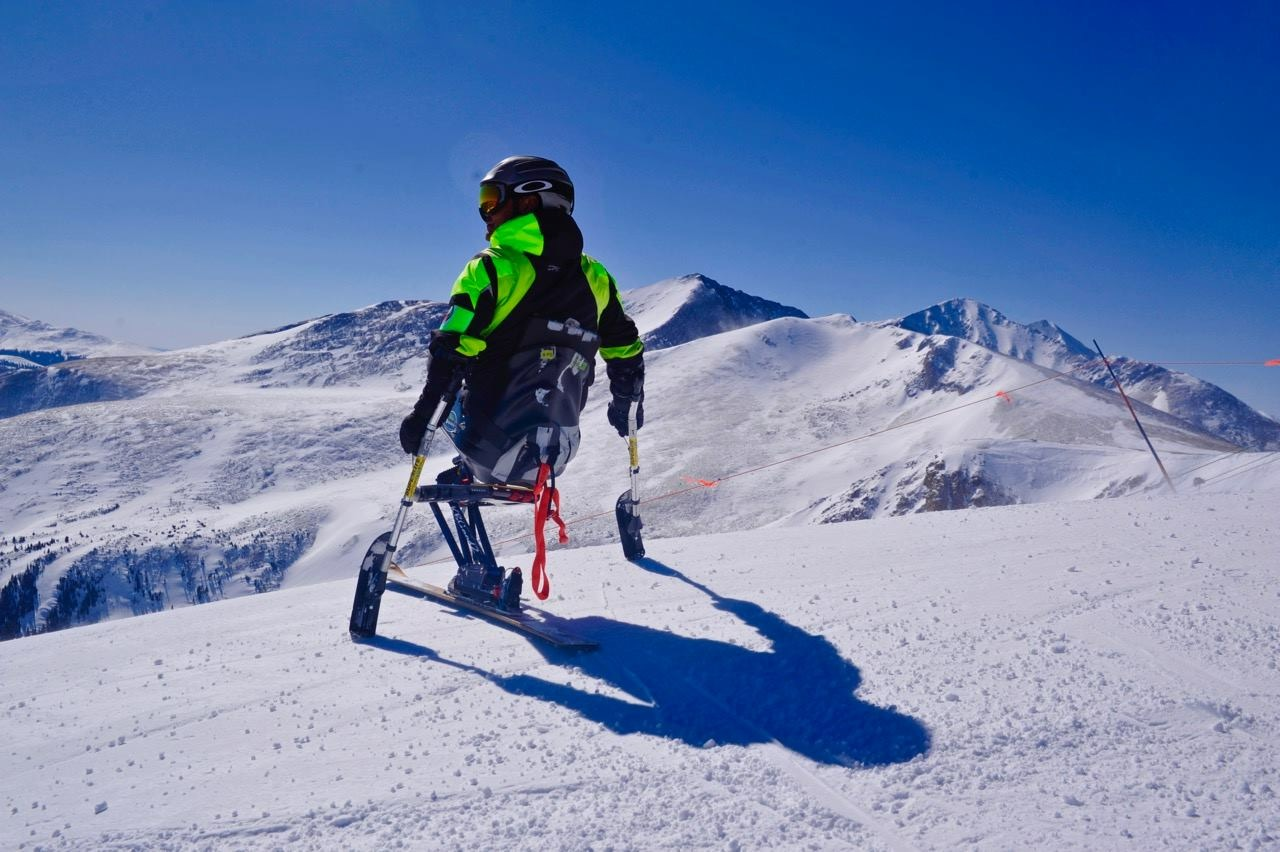
Hari Budha Magar skiing in Colorado. (Photo: Gary Humphrey)

While he was serving with the British Army in Afghanistan in 2010, Magar stepped on an improvised explosive device (IED). Ultimately, he lost his legs, both above the knee, and sustained a variety of other injuries.

Since his injuries, Magar has tried a variety of sports and adventures, including: golf, skiing, skydiving, kayaking, and rock climbing. He has also played wheelchair rugby and wheelchair basketball. He holds the world record for being the first double above-knee amputee to summit a mountain over 6,000 m (20,000 ft). And now, as of May 2023, he is the first and only double above-knee amputee ever to summit the world's tallest mountain, Mount Everest.

== Mountaineering ==
As of July 2023, Magar has summited Mount Everest (8,848m), Mont Blanc (4,810m), Chulu Far East (6,059m), Kilimanjaro (5,895m), Mera Peak (6,476m), and Denali (6,190 m). He climbed Mera Peak in 2017 and became the first double above-knee amputee to ever summit a mountain greater than 6,000m. When he summited Mount Everest on May 19, 2023, he became the first ever double above-knee amputee to do so.

=== Plan to climb Everest ===
Magar's ultimate goal, and plan, is to climb Mount Everest (8,848m), the tallest mountain in the world. In 2017, Nepal banned solo, blind, and double amputee climbers from climbing Mount Everest. Magar was already planning to climb the mountain when the news broke. He called out the ban as discriminatory and was heavily involved in campaigning and fighting it. In 2018, after a collective effort from Hari, disability organisations and other people, the Supreme Court of Nepal overturned the ban.

In May 2023, Hari Budha Magar achieved his goal as he became the first double above-knee amputee to summit Mount Everest. Because of this he won the Pride of Britain Award for Special Recognition in 2024.

Magar's ultimate goal was to climb all 7 of the tallest peaks in the world and has achieved that in January 2026. He has become the first ever double above-knee amputee to summit the tallest mountains in each continent
