= Hwama =

Bhabang भाबाङ्ग
- Village development committee
- Location in Nepal
- Coordinates: 28.40°N 82.59°E
- Country: Nepal
- Zone: Rapti Zone
- District: Rolpa District

Population (2021)
  - Total: 3,488
- Time zone: UTC+5:45 (Nepal Time)

Bhabang (Nepali: भाबाङ्ग, romanized: bhabang) -- also transliterated to bhabang—is a village development committee in Rolpa District in the Rapti Zone of north-eastern Nepal. At the time of the 2001 census nepal it had a population of 3488. This place is currently located in Ward No. 5 of Madi Rural Municipality.
