= Wadachaur =

Wadachaur वडाचौर
- Lungri Rural Municipality ward no 1
- Location in Nepal
- Coordinates: 28.27°N 82.77°E
- Country: Nepal
- Zone: Lumbini Province

Population (2021)
  - Total: 5,451
- Time zone: UTC+5:45 (Nepal Time)

Wadachaur is a village development committee in Rolpa District in the Rapti Zone of north-eastern Nepal. At the time of the 2021 Nepal census it had a population of 5451 people living in 1104 individual households. Currently this Village development committee (Nepal) located in Lungri Rural Municipality ward no 1. Rolpa Airport is located in this ward, Airport is currently closed due to no reason. This ward is also now the Lungri Rural Municipality center.
