= UWA =

Uwa or UWA may refer to:

== Organisations ==
=== Higher education institutions ===
- University of Wales, Aberystwyth (now Aberystwyth University), in Wales, United Kingdom
- University of Washington, in Seattle, Washington, United States
- University of West Alabama, in Livingston, Alabama, United States
- University of Western Australia, in Crawley, Western Australia, Australia

=== Other organisations ===
- Uganda Wildlife Authority, a government agency
- Universal Wrestling Association, a Mexican wrestling promotion

== Places ==
- Uwa, Ehime, Japan
- Uwa, Nepal

== Other uses ==
- Uwa (Ogiso) (died c. 1095), an Ogiso ('king') of Igodomigodo
- U'wa people, an indigenous people in Colombia
  - Uwa language
- Ultra wide angle lens, in photography

== See also ==
- Yua (disambiguation)
- Pitcher (container), or ewer
