= Siuri =

Siuri may refer to:

- Siuri, Nepal
- Suri, Birbhum, India
