= Thabang Rural Municipality =

Thabang (RM) थवाङ गाउँपालिका
- Rural Municipality
- Location Thabang (RM) (Nepal)
- Coordinates: 28.48°N 82.72°E
- Country: Nepal
- Province: Lumbini
- District: Rolpa
- Wards: 5
- Established: 10 March 2017

Government
  - Type: Rural Council
  - Chairperson: Mr.
  - Vice-chairperson: Mrs.
  - Term of office: (2017 - 2022)

Area
  - Total: 191.07 km^{2} (73.77 sq mi)

Population (2011)
  - Total: 10,881
  - Density: 56.948/km^{2} (147.49/sq mi)
- Time zone: UTC+5:45 (Nepal Standard Time)
- Headquarter: Thawang
- Website: thabangmun.gov.np

Thabang is a Rural municipality located within the Rolpa District of the Lumbini Province of Nepal. The rural municipality spans 191.07 square kilometres (73.77 sq mi) of area, with a total population of 10,881 according to a 2011 Nepal census.

On March 10, 2017, the Government of Nepal restructured the local level bodies into 753 new local level structures. The previous Thawang, Mirul and Uwa VDCs were merged to form Thabang Rural Municipality. Thabang is divided into 5 wards, with Thawang declared the administrative center of the rural municipality.

== Demographics ==
At the time of the 2011 Nepal census, Thabang Rural Municipality had a population of 10,881. Of these, 60.2% spoke Magar, 22.2% Kham, 16.2% Nepali, 0.9% Gurung, 0.1% Maithili and 0.4% other languages as their first language.

In terms of ethnicity/caste, 83.0% were Magar, 11.2% Kami, 1.6% Damai/Dholi, 1.4% other Dalit, 1.2% Chhetri, 1.0% Gurung, 0.1% Hill Brahmin and 0.5% others.

In terms of religion, 60.8% were Hindu, 32.3% Buddhist, 1.6% Christian, 1.5% Prakriti and 3.8% others.
