= Gaurigaun =

Gaurigaun गौरीगाउँ
- Village development committee
- Interactive map of Gaurigaun
- Country: Nepal
- Zone: Rapti Zone
- District: Rolpa District

Population (1991)
  - Total: 4,004
- Time zone: UTC+5:45 (Nepal Time)

Gaurigaun is a village development committee in Rolpa District in the Rapti Zone of north-eastern Nepal. At the time of the 1991 Nepal census it had a population of 4004 people living in 753 individual households.
