= U'wa =

U'wa, also known as Tunebo, may refer to:

- U'wa people
- Uwa language

== See also ==
- UWA (disambiguation)
