= Rangkot =

Rangkot राङकोट
- Village development committee
- Location in Nepal
- Coordinates: 28.50°N 82.57°E
- Country: Nepal
- Zone: Rapti Zone
- District: Rolpa District

Population (1991)
  - Total: 3,180
- Time zone: UTC+5:45 (Nepal Time)

Rangkot is a village development committee in Rolpa District in the Rapti Zone of north-eastern Nepal. At the time of the 1991 Nepal census it had a population of 3180 people living in 565 individual households.
