= Karchawang =

Coordinates: 28°21′32″N 82°32′45″E

Korchawang कर्चावाङ
- Village development committee
- Interactive map of Korchawang
- Country: Nepal
- Zone: Rapti Zone
- District: Rolpa District

Population (1991)
  - Total: 2,874
- Time zone: UTC+5:45 (Nepal Time)

Karchawang is a village development committee in Rolpa District in the Rapti Zone of north-eastern Nepal. At the time of the 1991 Nepal census it had a population of 2874 people living in 566 individual households.
