= Dubring =

Coordinates: 28°11′N 82°25′E

Dubring दुब्रिङ
- Village development committee
- Interactive map of Dubring
- Country: Nepal
- Province: Lumbini Province
- District: Rolpa District

Population (1991)
  - Total: 4,005
- Time zone: UTC+5:45 (Nepal Time)

Dubring is a village development committee in Rolpa District in Lumbini Province of north-eastern Nepal. At the time of the 1991 Nepal census it had a population of 4005 people living in 736 individual households.
