= Jauli Pokhari =

Jauli Pokhari जाउली पोखरी
- Village development committee
- Location in Nepal
- Coordinates: 28.20°N 82.60°E
- Country: Nepal
- Zone: Rapti Zone
- District: Rolpa District

Population (2011)
  - Total: 4,470
- Time zone: UTC+5:45 (Nepal Time)

Jaulipokhari is a village development committee in Rolpa District in the Rapti Zone of north-eastern Nepal. At the time of the 1991 Nepal census it had a population of 3555 people living in 654 individual households.
