= Jaimakasala =

Jaimakasala जैमाकासला
- Village development committee
- Location in Nepal
- Coordinates: 28.34°N 82.78°E
- Country: Nepal
- Zone: Rapti Zone
- District: Rolpa District

Population (2011)
  - Total: 3,020
- Time zone: UTC+5:45 (Nepal Time)

Jaimakasala is a village development committee in Rolpa District in the Rapti Zone of north-eastern Nepal. At the time of the 2011 Nepal census it had a population of 3020 people living in 580 individual households.
