= Jinawang =

Jinabang जिनाबाङ
- Village development committee
- Location in Nepal
- Coordinates: 28.41°N 82.40°E
- Country: Nepal
- Zone: Rapti Zone
- District: Rolpa District

Population (2011)
  - Total: 5,156
- Time zone: UTC+5:45 (Nepal Time)

Jinawang is a village development committee in Rolpa District in the Rapti Zone of north-eastern Nepal. At the time of the 2011 Nepal census it had a population of 5156 people living in 979 individual households.there peoples are worked in agricultural such as kiwi, apple, potato.
