= Bhawang =

Hwama ह्वामा Whama
- Village development committee
- Location in Nepal
- Coordinates: 28.37°N 82.63°E
- Country: Nepal
- Province: Lumbini Province
- District: Rolpa District

Population (1991)
  - Total: 3,730
- Time zone: UTC+5:45 (Nepal Time)

Hwama is a village development committee in Rolpa District in Lumbini Province of north-eastern Nepal. At the time of the 1991 Nepal census it had a population of 3730 people living in 678 individual households.
