= Iriwang =

Iriwang इरिवाङ Eriwang
- Village development committee
- Location in Nepal
- Coordinates: 28.48°N 82.50°E
- Country: Nepal
- Zone: Rapti Zone
- District: Rolpa District

Population (1991)
  - Total: 4,217
- Time zone: UTC+5:45 (Nepal Time)

VDC Map of Rolpa District

Iriwang (Nepali: इरिवाङ, romanized: Iriwāng) -- also transliterated to Eriwāng—is a village development committee in Rolpa District in Rapti Zone of north-eastern Nepal. At the time of the 1991 Nepal census, 4217 people were living within 743 individual households.
