= Sirpa =

Sirpa लुङ्ग्री गा.पा.०२ लुङ्ग्री गा.पा.२ सिर्प राेल्पा सिर्प
- Village development committee
- Location in Nepal
- Coordinates: 28.23°N 82.82°E
- Country: Nepal
- Zone: Rapti Zone
- District: Rolpa District

Population (1991)5258
  - Total: 5,258
- Time zone: UTC+5:45 (Nepal Time)
- < 22100 enter ZIP code, Postcode, Post code, Postal code=22100: 22100

Sirpa is a village development committee in Rolpa District in the Rapti Zone of north-eastern Nepal. At the time of the 1991 Nepal census it had a population of 5258 people living in 963 individual households.
