= Bhume Rural Municipality =

Rural municipality in Province No. 5, Nepal

Bhume (Nepali: भुमे गाउँपालिका) is a rural municipality located in Eastern Rukum District of Lumbini Province Province of Nepal.

== Demographics ==
At the time of the 2011 Nepal census, Bhume Rural Municipality had a population of 18,641. Of these, 64.3% spoke Nepali, 28.2% Magar, 5.6% Kham, 1.5% Gurung, 0.1% Ghale and 0.2% other languages as their first language.

In terms of ethnicity/caste, 66.1% were Magar, 16.6% Kami, 8.8% Chhetri, 3.1% Damai/Dholi, 2.1% Gurung, 1.7% Newar, 0.4% Thakuri, 0.2% Badi, 0.2% Hill Brahmin, 0.2% other Dalit, 0.1% Chamar/Harijan/Ram, 0.1% Ghale, 0.1% Thakali and 0.2% others.

In terms of religion, 95.7% were Hindu, 1.8% Christian, 0.1% Prakriti and 2.4% others.

In terms of literacy, 54.4% could read and write, 2.9% could only read and 42.7% could neither read nor write.
