= Gumchal =

Gumchal गुमचाल
- Village development committee
- Location in Nepal
- Coordinates: 28.29°N 82.80°E
- Country: Nepal
- Zone: Rapti Zone
- District: Rolpa District

Population (1991)
  - Total: 2,893
- Time zone: UTC+5:45 (Nepal Time)

Gumchal is a village development committee in Rolpa District in the Rapti Zone of north-eastern Nepal. At the time of the 1991 Nepal census it had a population of 2893 people living in 539 individual households.

The 2021 Nepal Census does not publish standalone population figures for former Village Development Committees (VDCs) such as Gumchal. After Nepal’s administrative restructuring in 2017, Gumchal and several neighboring VDCs (Wardachaur, Harjang, Pang, and Shirp) were merged into Lugri Rural Municipality, now Ward‑level units under that municipality.

According to the 2021 census, Lugri Rural Municipality comprised seven wards, including the former Gumchal area, and had a population of 26,539 in 5,486 households.
