= Ghodagaun =

Ghodagaun घोडागाउँ
- Village development committee
- Location in Nepal
- Coordinates: 28.21°N 82.65°E
- Country: Nepal
- Zone: Rapti Zone
- District: Rolpa District

Population (1991)
  - Total: 2,417
- Time zone: UTC+5:45 (Nepal Time)

Ghodagaun is a village development committee in Rolpa District in the Rapti Zone of north-eastern Nepal. At the time of the 1991 Nepal census it had a population of 241 people living in 476 individual households. Ghodagaun has now changed in Sunilsmritee Rural Municipalities 1 Number ward. linkage of road and communication is well. Shree Rameshwari Higher Secondary School is the main educational institute of Ghodagaun.
