= Mera Peak =

Mountain peak in Nepal

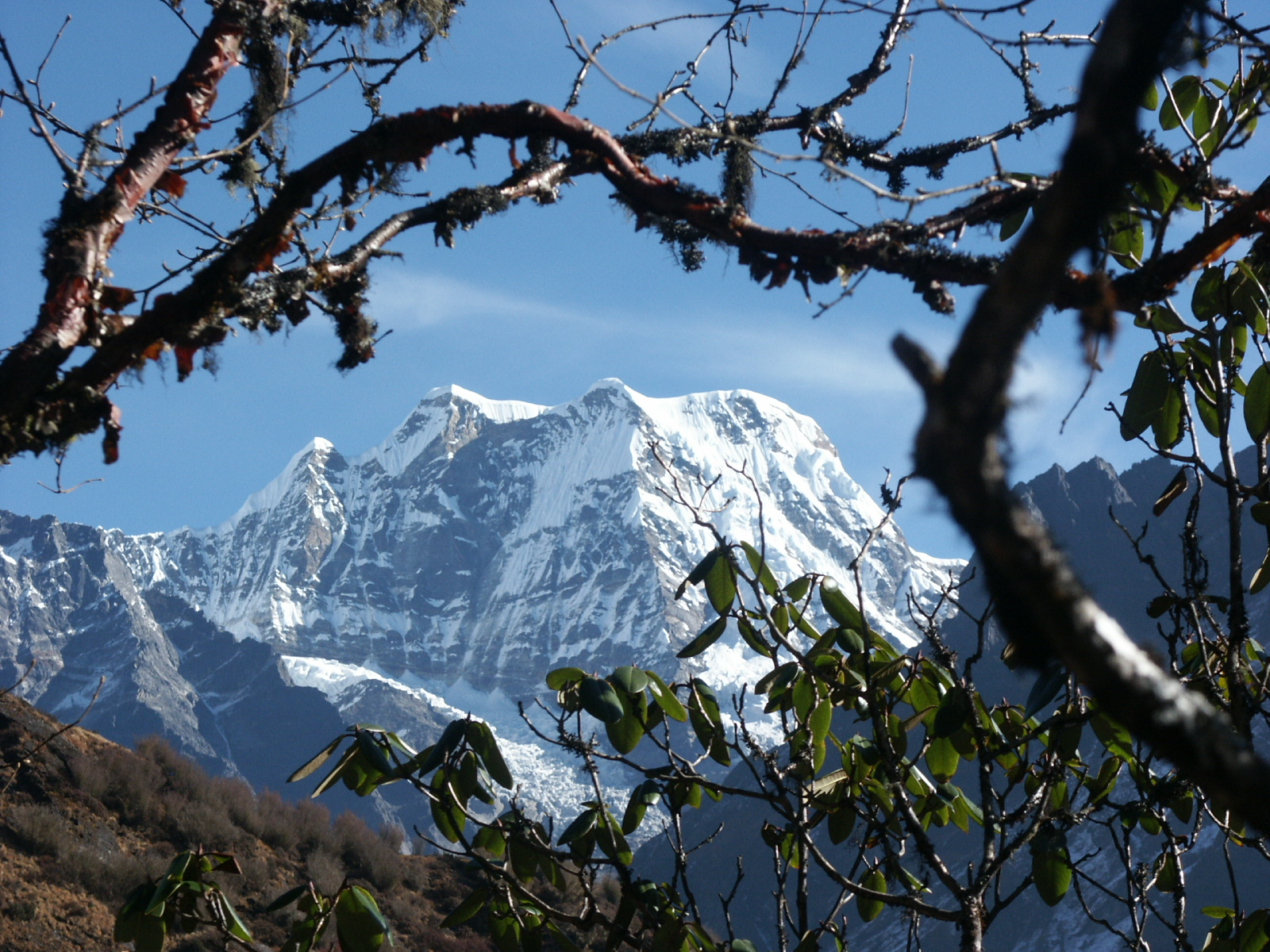

Highest point
- Elevation: 6,476 m (21,247 ft)
- Prominence: 1,063 m (3,488 ft)
- Coordinates: 27°42′33″N 86°52′06″E

Geography
- Location within Nepal
- Location: Hinku Valley, Nepal
- Parent range: Mahalangur Himalaya

Climbing
- First ascent: Mera Central: May 20, 1953 by Col J.O.M. Roberts and Sen Tenzing; Mera North: 1975 by Marcel Jolly, G. Baus and L. Honills
- Easiest route: snow/ice/glacier climb

Mera Peak is a mountain in the Mahalangur section, Barun sub-section of the Himalaya and administratively in Nepal's Sagarmatha Zone, Sankhuwasabha. At 6,476 metres (21,247 ft) it is classified as a trekking peak. It contains three main summits: Mera North, 6,476 metres (21,247 ft); Mera Central, 6,461 metres (21,198 ft); and Mera South, 6,065 metres (19,898 ft), as well as a smaller "trekking summit", visible as a distinct summit from the south but not marked on most maps of the region.

The height of Mera is often given as 6,654 metres (21,831 ft), and claimed to be the highest trekking peak. This figure actually points to nearby Peak 41, which was mistakenly named Mera in a list of Himalayan peaks, and the figures were copied to the official trekking peak list as they were, including the wrong location coordinates.

== History ==
The region was first explored extensively by British expeditions in the early 50s before and after the ascent of Everest. Members of those teams included Edmund Hillary, Tenzing Norgay, Eric Shipton and George Lowe.

The first ascent of Mera Central was on May 20, 1953, by Col. Jimmy Roberts and Sen Tenzing (who was known by the nickname The Foreign Sportsman). Roberts was heavily involved in establishing the trekking industry in Nepal in the early 1960s. He was posthumously awarded the "Sagarmatha (Everest) National Award" by the government in May 2005.

Mera North is believed to have first been climbed by the French climbers Marcel Jolly, G. Baus and L. Honills in 1975, though some sources state that it was climbed on 29 October 1973 and the climbers included L. Limarques, Ang Lhakpa and two other Sherpas.

In 1986 Mal Duff and Ian Tattersall made the first ascent of the south west pillar. The route is approximately 1,800 metres (5,900 ft) in length and graded at ED inf. The approach to the base of the pillar is extremely exposed to serac fall.

In September 2017, Hari Budha Magar summited Mera Peak, becoming the first double above-knee amputee to climb a mountain over 6,000m in altitude.

On 6 May 2024, a team from Cyprus set the Guinness World Record for the highest altitude fitness session on the summit of Mera Peak. The team was led by Alexis Economides, owner of Peak Condition and Peak World Adventures in Limassol. Along with Trevor Jones, Evgenia Konstantinou and four Sherpa guides they took part in a 30-minute workout session that included squats, planks, pushups and other exercises.

== Climbing routes ==
The standard route from the north involves high-altitude glacier walking. The west and south faces of the peak offer more difficult technical routes. Mera Peak provides 360-degree panoramic views of five mountains over 8000m: Mount Everest (8848m), Kangchenjunga (8586m), Lhotse (8516m), Makalu (8485m) and Cho Oyu (8201m) as well as many other peaks of Khumbu Region.

For experienced climbers it is a technically straightforward ascent, the main hurdle being proper acclimatization to the high altitude. These reasons make Mera Peak a very popular destination, with many adventure tour companies offering guided trips to the mountain for clients with little or no mountaineering experience. All climbers are recommended to partake in preparative fitness and altitude training before attempting an ascent.

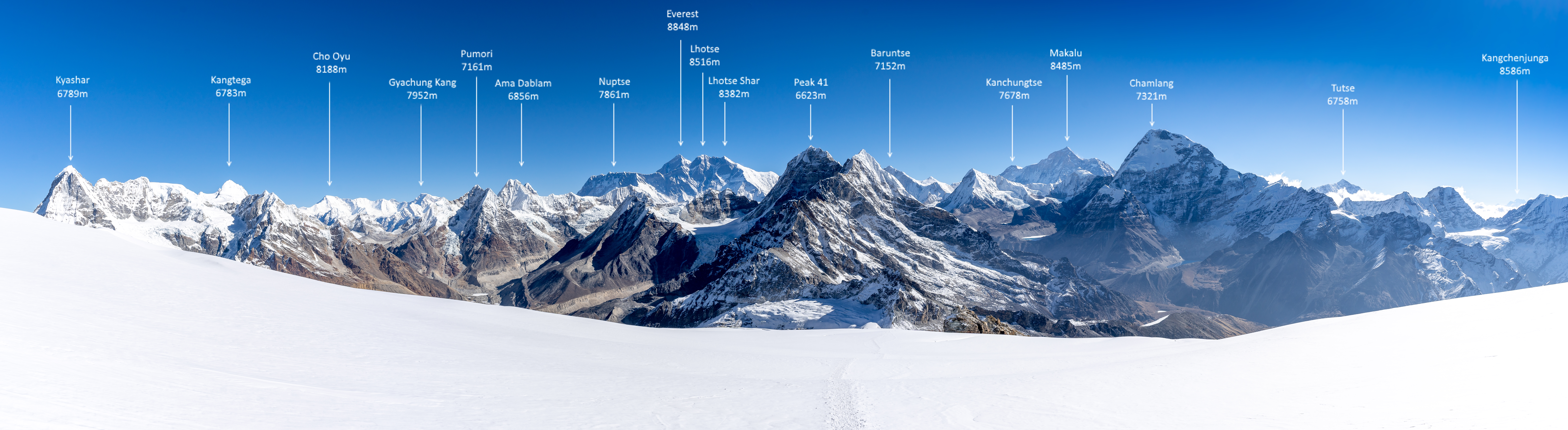
Panoramic view from Mera Peak
