= Gharti Gaun =

Coordinates: 28°21′N 82°27′E

Gharti Gaun घर्ती गाउँ
- Village development committee
- Interactive map of Gharti Gaun
- Country: Nepal
- Zone: Rapti Zone
- District: Rolpa District

Population (1991)
  - Total: 4,105
- Time zone: UTC+5:45 (Nepal Time)

Gharti Gaun is a village development committee in Rolpa District in the Rapti Zone of north-eastern Nepal. At the time of the 1991 Nepal census it had a population of 4105 people living in 734 individual households.
