= Sakhi, Nepal =

Sakhi सखी
- Village development committee
- Location in Nepal
- Coordinates: 28.23°N 82.53°E
- Country: Nepal
- Zone: Rapti Zone
- District: Rolpa District

Population (1991)
  - Total: 2,798
- Time zone: UTC+5:45 (Nepal Time)

Sakhi is a village development committee in Rolpa District in the Rapti Zone of north-eastern Nepal. At the time of the 1991 Nepal census it had a population of 2798 people living in 525 individual households.

To Promote local culture Sakhi has one FM radio station Radio Sunchhahari F.M - 101.5 MHz Which is a Community radio Station.
