= Rank, Nepal =

Rank राङ्क
- Village development committee
- Location in Nepal
- Coordinates: 28.48°N 82.46°E
- Country: Nepal
- Zone: Rapti Zone
- District: Rolpa District

Population (1991)
  - Total: 4,442
- Time zone: UTC+5:45 (Nepal Time)

Rank is a village development committee in Rolpa District in the Rapti Zone of north-eastern Nepal. At the time of the 1991 Nepal census it had a population of 4442 people living in 665 individual households.
