= Budagaun =

Budhagaun बुढागाँउ
- Village development committee
- Location in Nepal
- Coordinates: 28.30°N 82.42°E
- Country: Nepal
- Province: Lumbini Province
- District: Rolpa District

Population (1991)
  - Total: 4,550
- Time zone: UTC+5:45 (Nepal Time)

Budhagaun is a village development committee in Rolpa District in Lumbini Province of western Nepal. At the time of the 1991 Nepal census it had a population of 4,550 people living in 836 individual households.
