= Kareti =

Kareti करेती
- Village development committee
- Location in Nepal
- Coordinates: 28.28°N 82.56°E
- Country: Nepal
- Zone: Rapti Zone
- District: Rolpa District

Population (1991)
  - Total: 1,808
- Time zone: UTC+5:45 (Nepal Time)

Kareti is a village development committee in Rolpa District in the Rapti Zone of north-eastern Nepal. At the time of the 1991 Nepal census it had a population of 1808 people living in 380 individual households.
