= Harjang =

Harjang हार्जाङ
- Village development committee
- Location in Nepal
- Coordinates: 28.32°N 82.80°E
- Country: Nepal
- Zone: Rapti Zone
- District: Rolpa District

Population (1991)
  - Total: 2,011
- Time zone: UTC+5:45 (Nepal Time)

Harjang is a village development committee in Rolpa District in the Rapti Zone of north-eastern Nepal. At the time of the 1991 Nepal census it had a population of 2011 people living in 360 individual households.
