= Jungar, Nepal =

Jungar जुङ्गर
- Village development committee
- Location in Nepal
- Coordinates: 28.33°N 82.43°E
- Country: Nepal
- Zone: Rapti Zone
- District: Rolpa District

Population (2011)
  - Total: 5,169
- Time zone: UTC+5:45 (Nepal Time)

Jungar is a village development committee in Rolpa District in the Rapti Zone of north-eastern Nepal. At the time of the 2011 Nepal census it had a population of 5,169 people living in 1,019 individual households.
