= Talawang =

Talabang तेलाबाङ
- Village development committee
- Location in Nepal
- Coordinates: 28.43°N 82.48°E
- Country: Nepal
- Zone: Rapti Zone
- District: Rolpa District

Population (2011)
  - Total: 5,180
- Time zone: UTC+5:45 (Nepal Time)

Talawang is a village development committee in Rolpa District in the Rapti Zone of mid-western development region of north-eastern Nepal. At the time of the 2011 Nepal census it had a population of 5180 people living in 1048 individual households.
