= Mirul =

Mirul मिरुल Bhirul
- Village development committee
- Location in Nepal
- Coordinates: 28.46°N 82.67°E
- Country: Nepal
- Zone: Rapti Zone
- District: Rolpa District

Population (1991)
  - Total: 2,571
- Time zone: UTC+5:45 (Nepal Time)

Mirul (Nepali: मिरुल, romanized: mirul) -- sometimes transliterated to Bhirul—is a village development committee in Rolpa District in the Rapti Zone of north-eastern Nepal. At the time of the 1991 Nepal census it had a population of 2571.
