= Jedwang =

Jedbang जेदबाङ
- Village development committee
- Location in Nepal
- Coordinates: 28.24°N 82.59°E
- Country: Nepal
- Zone: Rapti Zone
- District: Rolpa District

Population (2011)
  - Total: 3,802
- Time zone: UTC+5:45 (Nepal Time)

Jedwang is a village development committee in Rolpa District in the Rapti Zone of north-eastern Nepal. At the time of the 2011 Nepal census it had a population of 3802 people living in 737 individual households.
