= Kham Magar =

Ethnic minority of western Nepal

खाम मगर

Total population
- 210,000

Regions with significant populations
- Nepal

Languages
- Magar Kham language

Religion
- Shamanism, ]

The Kham Magars (खाम मगर), also known in scholarship as the Northern Magars, are a Magar Kham language (Tibeto-Burman language) or Kham Kura speaking indigenous ethnic tribal community native to Nepal. In general, Kham Magars refer to themselves using their clan name and the ethnic identity of Magar. Kham Magar clan names include Budha, Gharti, Pun and Roka, and each clan is subdivided into many sub-clans name. The language of the Kham Magars is called Magar Kham among other glottonyms. It is estimated that about 210,000 Kham Magars live in the Middle Hills of mid-western Nepal, in the districts of Rukum, Rolpa, Baglung and Myagdi. Scattered communities also live in Jajarkot, Dailekh, Kalikot, Achham, and Doti districts as well as in the capital city of Kathmandu and in the second-largest city Pokhara.

== History ==
Due to their oral mythology and distinctive Shamanistic practices, Kham Magar are thought to have originally migrated from Siberia according to shamanic tradition, but some writers have written that they originated in Rukum district. There is no evidence of their migration or origin.

Oral histories handed down from generation to generation say that Kham people migrated from icy northern icy Himalayan Region in the southern part of China, after the Kham civilization got lost and submerged in the icy glaciers in and around 200 AD. Later, the Kham kings ruled from the present Karnali region or ancient Nepal region in the far west. However, after Khas kings from Kumaon and Garhwal continued to attack upon Kham kings in the Humla and Jumla area in and around 400 AD.

The Kham kings are reported to have fought against brute Khas aggressors for hundreds of years. But Kham's last king, Khudu, was defeated. He fought fiercely against the Garra army but was deposed. Khas kingdom flourished in the Jumla region after they claimed this region as Khasan.

== Geography ==
Northern Magars inhabit highlands 3,000–4,000 metres (9,800–13,100 ft) above sea level, some 50 km (31 mi) south of the Dhaulagiri range, forming a triple divide between the Karnali-Bheri system to the west, the Gandaki system to the east, and the smaller (western) Rapti and Babai river systems that separate the two larger systems south of this point. Since the uppermost tributaries of the Karnali and Gandaki rise beyond the highest Himalaya ranges, trade routes linking India and Tibet developed along these rivers, whereas the high ridges along the Rapti's northern watershed and then the Dhaulagiri massif beyond were rigorous obstacles. Similarly, Hindus fleeing Hindu-Muslim conflicts, Brahmin people, settled around these highlands with the Kham Magars by following the Mahabharat Range to the south or the Dhorpatan valley to the north which—by Himalayan standards—offers exceptionally easy east–west passage. The Kham Magar highlands may also have been left as a buffer between the easternmost Baise kingdom, Salyan, and the westernmost Chaubisi kingdom, Pyuthan.

Kham civilization is said to have given "Pal" title to many of its inhabitants. Pal kings were the early rulers of Nepal during which Kham Magar were given the title of Pals at the end of their names.

== Underdevelopment ==
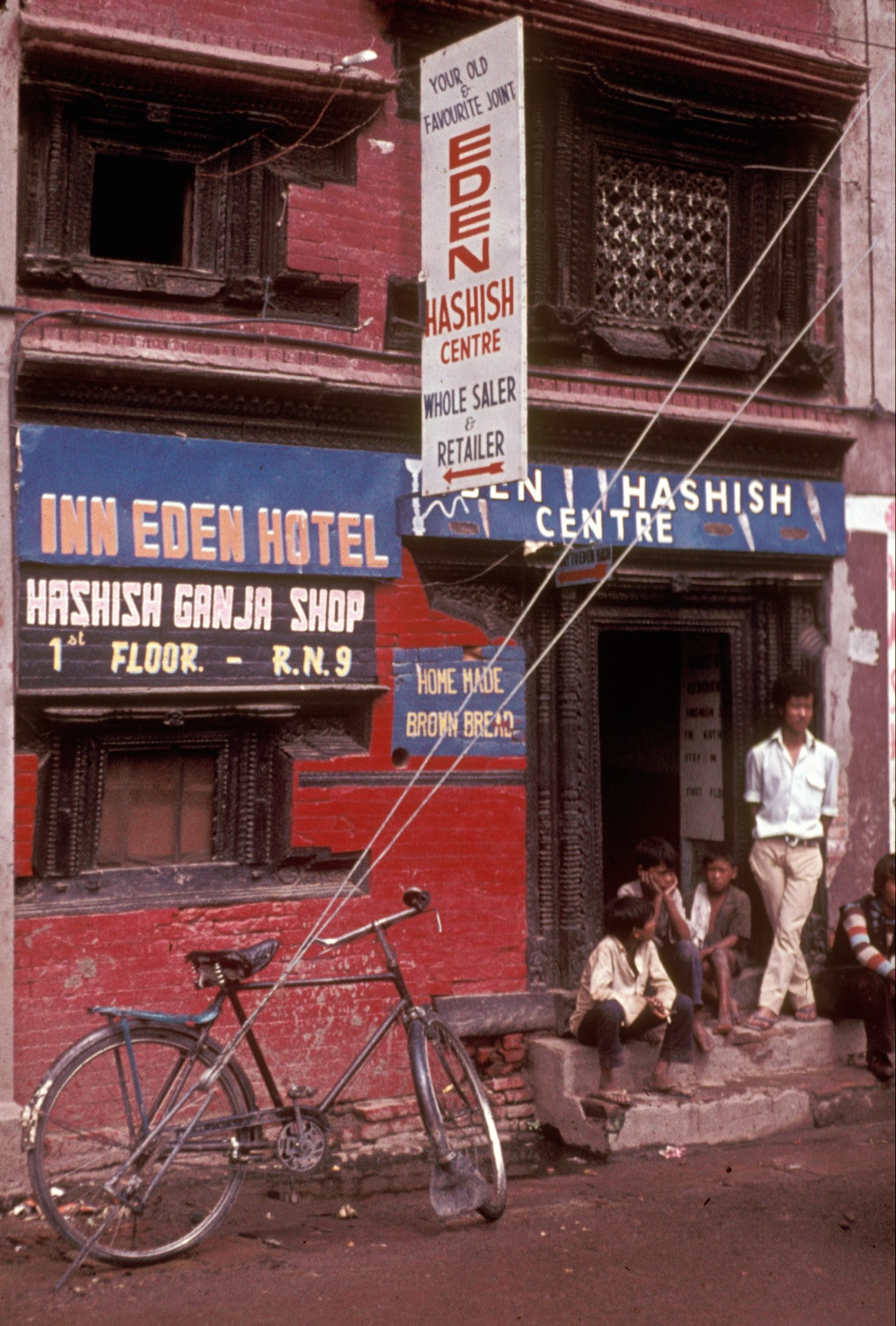
Legal hashish shop, Kathmandu, 1973

After unification of Nepal by Shaha king, official neglect, underdevelopment and poverty essentially continued through the 19th and 20th centuries. The main export was mercenaries for the British and Indian armies, or whatever other employment opportunities could be found for largely uneducated and unskilled labor. Northern magar also practice transhumance by grazing cattle, sheep and goats in summer pastures in subalpine and alpine pastures to the north, working their way down to winter pastures in the Dang-Deukhuri valleys. Despite unending toil, food shortages have become a growing problem that still persists. Food deficits were historically addressed by grain imports bought dearly with distant work at low wages.

As some corrupted development brought schools, electricity, motor roads, hospitals and some range of consumer goods to specific surrounding areas, few benefits trickled up into the highlands and contrasts became even more invidious. Development introduced motor transport, which diminished porterage employment. Cultivating hemp and processing it into charas (hashish) lost standing as an income generator after 1976 when international pressure persuaded the national government to outlaw these recreational drugs and close government stores where those so inclined could freely purchase what was illegal in most of the world. But the local government directly or indirectly encouraged the drugs.

== Nepalese Civil War ==
Despite adversity, the Magar people retained a robust oral history and a sense of past greatness, which created grievances and made them receptive to the Maobadi (Maoist) movement that opposed the Shah Dynasty regime in the 1996-2006 Nepalese Civil War and even the multiparty democracy that the Shahs had toyed with. The Rolpa and Rukum districts in the center of the Magars homelands became known as the "Maoist Heartland" and the Kham Magars were prominent as footsoldiers of its guerrilla forces and played a significant role during Nepal's Maoist movement and during Maoist Civil War (or Nepal Civil War), figures like PLA Deputy Commander Barshaman Pun Magar and former Chief Commander Nanda Bahadur Pun Magar, who both led the People's Liberation Army.

== Kham festivals ==
Bhume Naach (Bal puja) is one of the ancient cultural festivals celebrated by the Kham Magar tribes of Rolpa and Rukum.

The main celebration takes place during the first week of June. Kham Magars people dance very slowly in the Jholeni and Bhume dances, while Magars dance a fast dance, the Kaura dance. Currently Kham people worship their ancestors through animism and shamanism.
