= Yua =

Yua may refer to:

== People ==
- Yua Aida (あいだゆあ; born 1984), Japanese model and actress
- Yua Mikami (三上 悠亜; born 1993), Japanese singer and actress
- Yua Shinkawa (新川 優愛; born 1993), Japanese actress and model

== Other uses ==
- Yua Bateson, a fictional character in the video game Breath of Fire II
- Yua (spirit), a spirit or soul in Yup'ik mythology
- Yua (plant), a genus of vines
