= Magar Kham language =

Sino-Tibetan language of western Nepal

Kham Magar
- Kham
- मगर ढुट
- Native to: Nepal
- Ethnicity: Kham Magar
- Speakers: 91,753 (2021); L2: 91,753(2021)
- Language family: Sino-Tibetan: Tibeto-Burman; Himalayish; Magaric; Kham Magar
- Writing system: Devanagari

Language codes
- ISO 639-3: Variously: kif – Eastern Parbate Kham kgj – Gamale Kham kip – Sheshi Kham kjl – Western Parbate Pang
- Glottolog: kham1286
- ELP: Gamale Kham
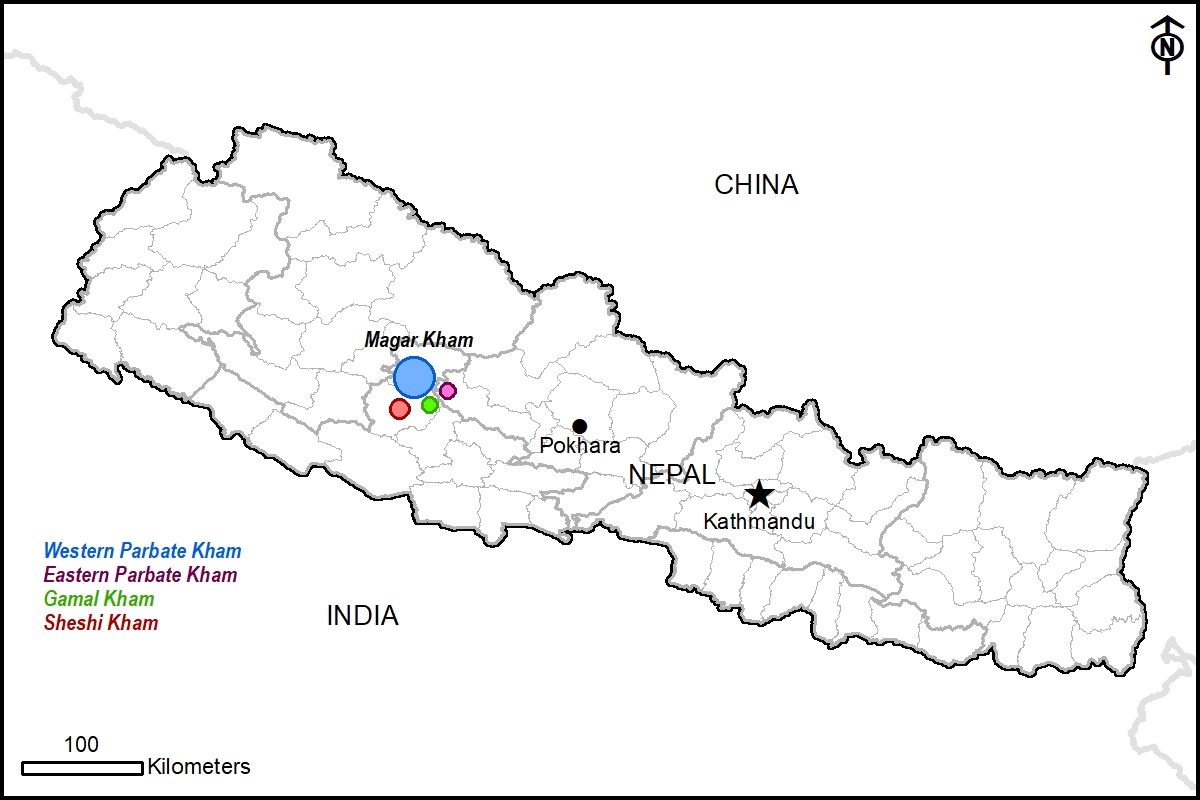
- Coordinates: 28.563229, 82.848238

Magar Kham (मगर खाम), also known as Kham, Kham Magar, and Khamkura, is the Sino-Tibetan language variety of the Northern Magar people of Nepal. The language is situated in the upper elevations of Baglung, East Rukum, and Rolpa districts. Based on census data taken in 2021, the total population of Magar Kham is estimated to be about 91,753 speakers.

== Language classification ==
Magar Kham is a Sino-Tibetan language, and it is classified by David Bradley as “Central Himalayan,” and as being related to Magar and Chepang and more distantly related to the Kiranti languages. George van Driem also classifies Magar Kham as “Para-Kiranti,” emphasizing that Magar Kham, Magar, and Chepang are united more by their differences from the Kiranti cluster than by their similarity to one another. Within this cluster, Magar Kham possesses a number of unique grammatical features, and shares only 44% lexical similarity with Magar and 38% with Chepang.

== Dialects ==
Magar Kham speakers generally refer to their dialect using the name of an important village or river in conjunction with the Nepali instrumental suffix [-le] or the genitive suffix [-i]. Thus, it can be said that Magar Kham has as many dialects as there are villages and rivers in their native territory. The table below presents the major dialects of the Magar Kham language as they have been classified by David E. Watters. The ISO 639-3 codes associated with each major dialect are presented in brackets.

=== Magar Kham varieties ===
Gamal Kham [kgj]	Sheshi Kham [kip]	Parbate Kham	
Ghusbangi Kham Tamali Kham	Jangkoti Kham Tapnangi Kham	Western Parbate Kham [kjl]	Eastern Parbate Kham [kif]
Ghusbangi Kham Tamali Kham	Jangkoti Kham Tapnangi Kham	Maikoti Kham Takale Kham Thabangi Kham Wale Kham	Nisel Kham Bhujel Kham

At the highest level in the table, Kham has been divided into Gamal Kham, Sheshi Kham, and Parbate Kham, which is further divided into Eastern and Western Parbate Kham. As previously stated, these four major dialects are mutually unintelligible and bear unique grammatical innovations indicative of different languages. For this reason, each of these dialects have been given its own ISO 639-3 designation.

== Speakers ==
Based on the census data taken in 2021, the total population of Magar Kham speakers is estimated to be about 91,753 persons. The tables below presents the homeland population estimates by district and by dialect. It is estimated that about 92,000 Magar Kham speakers live in diaspora.

=== Magar Kham population by district ===
Province	District	Estimated Population
Gandaki	Baglung	37,000
Lumbini	East Rukum	78,000
Lumbini	Rolpa	127,000

=== Magar Kham population by dialect/variety ===
According to Ethnologue:

Dialect	ISO 639-3	Native speakers (year)	L2 speakers (year)	Total speakers (year)
Gamal Kham	kgj	7,000 (2021)	3,000 (2021)	10,000 (2021)
Sheshi Kham	kip	—N/a	—N/a	91,753 (2021)
Eastern Parbate	kif	—N/a	—N/a	50,000 (2021)
Western Parbate	kjl	38,000 (2003)	25,000 (2021)	69,000 (2003–2021)
All varieties	—N/a	—N/a	—N/a	127,000 (2003–2021)

Estimates are based on the number of persons registering their mother tongue as either “Magar” or “Kham” within the territory of the northern Magars.

== Language vitality ==
Although their homeland is fairly homogeneous, northern Magars are multilingual. The national language of Nepali is spoken confidently by all individuals under 35 years old. In some communities (Sheshi and Eastern Parbate), parents have shifted to speaking Nepali with their children, and the speaker population is gradually decreasing. However, in all of East Rukum and in the Gam river valley of Rolpa, the language is being vigorously transmitted. Ethnologue has assigned the following EGIDS levels to each variety:

- Western Parbate Kham [kjl]: level 5 (Developing)
- Eastern Parbate Kham [kif]: level 6b (Threatened)
- Gamal Kham [kgj]: level 6a (Vigorous)
- Sheshi Kham [kip]: level 6b (Threatened)

The UNESCO Endangered Languages Project has classified Gamal Kham as "Vulnerable."

== Phonology ==
=== Consonants ===
The Taka dialect of Western Parbate Kham has 22 consonant phonemes while Gamal Kham possesses around 29 to 30 consonant phonemes.

		Labial	Alveolar		Palatal	Velar	Glottal
		Labial	plain	sibilant	Palatal	Velar	Glottal
Nasal	voiceless	m̥^{2}	n̥^{2}			ŋ̊^{1}	
Nasal	voiced	m	n			ŋ	
Plosive/ Affricate	voiceless	p	t	t͡s		k	ʔ^{2}
Plosive/ Affricate	voiced	b	d	d͡z		ɡ	
Plosive/ Affricate	aspirated	pʰ	tʰ	t͡sʰ		kʰ	
Fricative	voiceless		ɬ^{2}	s	ç^{1}		h
Fricative	voiced			z			
Rhotic			ɾ^{3}				
Approx.	voiceless	ɥ̊^{2}				ʍ^{2}	
Approx.	voiced	ɥ^{2}	l		j	w	

1. These phonemes only appear in Ghusbang and Sheram dialect. All others appear in every Kham dialect.
2. These phonemes do not occur in Parbate Kham.
3. The rhotic /ɾ/ is realized as a trill [r] at the end of words. Otherwise, it is a flap.

=== Vowels ===
Taka dialect of Western Parbate has 25 vowel phonemes.

	Front					Central			Back					
	unrounded			rounded		Central			unrounded			rounded		
	short	long	nasal	short	long	short	long	nasal	short	long	nasal	short	long	nasal
Close	i^{1}	iː	ĩː	y	yː				ɯ	ɯː	ɯ̃ː	u^{1}	uː	ũː
Mid	e^{1}	eː	ẽː	ø	øː	ə^{1}	əː	ə̃ː				o^{1}	oː	õː
Open mid	ɛ													
Open						ɐ^{1}	ɐː	ɐ̃ː						

1. These vowels occur in every dialect of Kham.

== Writing ==
=== Consonants ===
	1	2	3	4	5	6	7	8
Deva.	ज़	झ़	न्ह	म्ह	व़	ह्ल	ह्व	ह्व़
trans.	z	zh	nh	mh	ẏ	hl	hw	hẏ
IPA	z	zV̤	n̥	m̥	ɥ	ɬ	ʍ	ɥ̊

क	ख	ग	घ	ङ
/kə/	/kʰə/	/ɡə/	/ɡə̤/	/ŋə/
च	छ	ज	झ	ञ
/t͡sə/	/t͡sʰə/	/d͡zə/	/d͡zə̤/	/nə/
ट	ठ	ड	ढ	ण
/tə/	/tʰə/	/də/	/də̤/	/nə/
त	थ	द	ध	न
/tə/	/tʰə/	/də/	/də̤/	/nə/
प	फ	ब	भ	म
/pə/	/pʰə/	/bə/	/bə̤/	/mə/
य	र	ल	व	
/jə/	/rə/	/lə/	/wə/	
श	ष	स	ह	
/çə/	/sə/	/sə/	/hə/	
क्ष	त्र	ज्ञ		
/t͡sʰə/	/trə/	/ɡjə/		

=== Vowels ===
Vowels for Parbate Kham
Devanagari	Roman	IPA
अ	a	ə
आ	ā	ɐ
इ	i	i
इ़	ü	y
ई	ī	iː
उ	u	u
उ़	ï	ɯ
ऊ	ū	uː
ए	e	e, ɛ
ए़	ø	ø
ऐ	ai	əj
ओ	o	o
औ	au	əw
ः	h, ḥ	V̤
ँ	◌̃	◌̃ː
ं	◌̃, ṅ, n, ṇ, ñ	◌̃ː, ŋ, n
ॱ, . °, ॰, ऽ	'	◌ː
ॽ	’	ʔ

=== Vowels for Gamal Kham ===
Orthography	अ	आ	इ/ई	उ/ऊ	ए	ऐ	ओ	औ	अं	अः	अँ	ॱअ
Roman	a	ā	i/ī	u/ū	e	ai	o	au	aṃ	aḥ	ã	a'
IPA	ə	ɐ	i	u	e, ɛ	əj	o	əw	ə̃	ə̤	ə̃	əʔ

== Morphology ==
=== Pronouns ===
	singular	dual	plural
1st person	naː	gin	geː
2nd person	nɨ̃ː	jin	jeː
3rd person	noː	noːni	noːrə

=== Nouns ===
==== Number ====
Kham nouns are marked for three numbers: singular (unmarked), dual (-ni) and plural (-rə). The plural marker has an allomorph -ra that appears when it is followed by another suffix.

==== Case ====
Kham nominals are marked for various morphosyntactical and locational cases.

Core case markers:

- Nominative -Ø
- Ergative -e/-je
- Oblique/Objective -lai
- Tripartite marking: The split ergativity patterns in Kham is overlapped for most of the argument's person/number and thus when both the agent and object arguments are both in the higher ranks of the argument hierarchy, the transitive subject/agent must be marked with ergative, while the object takes the oblique in order to distinguish it from the S/A arguments. There is no semantic and discourse-orientated variations in Kham alignment marking.

Peripheral case markers:

- Genitive (third person only) -e/-je
- Comitative and associative -sə.
- Instrumental -e/-je
- Locative -kə
- Ablative -ni
- Allative -da
- Elative -kin
- Delative -tin
- Adessive -ŋa
- Inessive -lə
- Superessive -tə

==== Possessive ====
	singular	dual	plural
1st person	ŋa-	gin-	ge-
2nd person	nə-	jin-	dʒe-
3rd person	o-/u-	ni-	ja-

Kin terms are marked by inalienable possessive unless they are used as vocatives or referential proper nouns. Eg. ŋa-bəhrca ('my nephew') vs. phubu ('Aunt').

==== Gender ====
In Kham, a small number of lexical items are marked for gender, but not affecting elsewhere in the morphosyntax: -pa masculine, -ma feminine, and -za diminutive. Indo-Aryan gender distinction -a/-i is also borrowed, creating a semi-productive 'similative' class of nouns, i.e. lexical object is conceptualized as representative of an attribute.

korop ('stitch') > koropcya ('[masculine] scar-face') / 'kurupci' ('[feminine] scar-face').

=== Verbs ===
Verbs in Kham inflect for various tense, aspect, mood, and mode categories, voices, negation, person/number of the subject, agent, and of the object in active voice. Kham person indexation have different paradigms for intransitive and transitive verbs as well for indicatives, optatives, and imperatives.

laː-kə ŋa-səres-duh-zja
day-LOC 1SG.SUBJ-recognize-ABIL-IPFV
'I can recognize him in the daytime.'

== Reconstruction ==
Proto-Kham has been reconstructed by Watters (2002). Proto-Kham reconstructions from Watters (2002: 443–456) are given below.

A. Body parts

- *r-dzəŋ ~ *b-dzəŋ 'back'
- *yep 'back (upper)'
- *phuː 'belly'
- *dziːh 'blood'
- *klaŋ 'body'
- *s-rus 'bone'
- *nun 'breast'
- *sək 'breath'
- *r-mehsiŋ 'buttocks'
- *r-tso 'cheek'
- *r-na 'ear'
- *(ba)r-zut 'egg'
- *mik 'eye'
- *s-ŋa 'face'
- *sot 'fat'
- *r-sin 'fingernail'
- *kəŋ 'foot'
- *r-nihl 'gums'
- *r-ta 'guts'
- *muhl 'hair (body)'
- *p-tsem 'hair (head)'
- *kut 'hand'
  - *r-la 'the under-arm area; side of the body'
- *s-r-ŋat 'head'
- *s-yiŋ 'heart'
- *b-rəhŋ 'horn'
- *sya 'animal'
- *r-khap 'jawbone'
- *kəl 'kidney'
- *p-sin 'liver'
- *yaːh 'mouth'
- *s-məŋ 'mustache'
- *r-dehŋ 'neck'
- *s-nat 'nose'
- *r-dzihs 'piss'
- *s-nis 'pus'
- *b-rəhm 'rib'
- *p-s-til 'saliva'
- *kli 'shit'
  - *r-kək 'excrement in the intestine of a slaughtered animal'
- *s-pum 'shoulder'
- *r-sa 'sinew'
- *l-kota 'skin'
- *r-nahp 'snot'
- *r-meh 'tail'
- *r-pihl 'tears'
- *r-b-yah 'thigh (upper side)'
- *p-s-le 'tongue'
- *ha-p-sya 'tooth'
- *wohs 'vomit'
- *hwaŋ 'waist'
- *r-mil ~ *s-mil 'wind pipe'
- *kər 'wing'

B. Pronouns/kinship terms/nouns referring to humans'

- *dahpa 'bachelor'
- *za 'child'
- *nan 'friend'
- *b-re 'husband'
- *dahme 'maiden'
- *r-min 'name'
- *r-mi; *ruː 'person'
  - *s-lepa 'man, male human'
  - *miːma 'woman, female human' < *mi 'person' + *ma 'female'
- *nana 'sister (older)'
- *nam 'sister (younger)'
- *nəŋ 'thou'
- *dzya 'wife'

C. Foodstuff

- *bəhres 'bread'
- *tsip 'curry'
- *r-zəm 'food'
- *s-ŋən 'herbs'
- *raŋrəi 'millet'
- *r-mo 'mushroom'
- *hek 'parched grain'
- *tuk 'poison'
- *(ya)kaŋ 'rice (cooked)'
- *plima 'wheat'

D. Animal names or animal products

- *səhr 'antelope'
- *nim 'bear'
- *r-pen 'bedbug'
- *b-zin 'bee'
- *bwa 'bird'
  - *s-puŋ 'chick'
- *gəl 'boar (wild)'
- *b-s-rut 'bug'
- *s-raŋ 'cat'
- *har 'cow'
- *kaːh 'dog'
- *ŋah 'fish'
- *tek 'frog'
- *ra 'goat'
- *r-ta 'horse'
- *r-pəti 'leech'
- *la 'leopard'
- *syar 'louse'
- *s-p-yu; *s-p-ya 'monkey'
- *srəm 'otter'
- *b-rəhŋ 'pheasant'
- *wə 'pig'
- *bi 'rat'
- *luk 'sheep'
- *guhl 'snake'
  - *daŋ 'python, constricting snake'
- *p-s-yap 'squirrel (flying)'
- *s-kyar 'woodpecker'
- *p-sən 'wool'

E. Natural objects or phenomena; the inanimate landscape; vegetable and mineral kingdoms

- *r-plah 'ashes'
- *kər 'branch'
- *r-pup 'cave'
- *la 'day'
  - *tshyam 'a certain day'
- *b-rih 'dirt'
- *r-gəm 'earth'
- *rihm 'evening'
- *ehŋ 'field'
  - *baŋ 'a field, meadow, bowl shaped valley'
- *meh 'fire'
- *p-set 'fruit'
- *tshi 'grass'
- *kuŋ 'hole'
- *dzəhŋ 'iron'
- *s-la 'leaf'
- *r-nahm 'low country'
- *p-s-ya + *hwot 'moon'
- *goŋ 'mountain'
- *rik; *mun 'night'
- *r-wa 'rain'
- *bəih 'river'
- *yem 'road'
- *s-rin 'root'
- *sa + *pik 'salt'
- *nup 'set (sun)'
- *saŋ 'shadow'
- *nəm 'sky'
- *mihkut 'smoke' < *meːh 'fire' + *ku 'smoke'
- *r-pom 'snow'
- *səro 'star'
- *r-dzuht 'stick'
- *luŋ 'stone'
- *nəmi(y) 'sun'
- *b-zu 'thorn'
- *siŋ 'tree'
- *riːh 'water'
  - *rihmun 'cooking water' < *riːh 'water' + *mun 'warm'
- *rəhm 'weed'

F. Artifacts and social organization

- *r-wan 'arrowhead'
- *r-wa 'axe'
- *r-beh(k) 'basket'
- *li 'bow'
- *tshəm 'bridge'
- *pəsi(-s) 'broom'
- *kwa 'cloth'
- *yahm 'door'
- *b-rihŋ 'drum'
- *'gor 'circle'
- *muhthap 'hearth' < *muh 'burn' + *thap 'hearth'
- *zihm 'house'
  - *r-bəŋ 'lower storey of house; cattle byre'
- *khor 'knife'
- *gur 'load'
- *tən 'sleeping mat'
- *b-lo 'large bamboo mat'
- *tshum 'mortar'
- *r-gəp 'a small needle'
- *r-khap 'a large needle'
- *b-zəhn 'net'
- *r-gum 'pillow'
- *gohr 'plow'
- *b-dza 'pot'
- *p-sip 'sheath'
- *tsihŋ 'snare'
- *gel 'spirit'
- *naŋkhar; *nam 'village'
- *ehn 'work'
- *kum 'yoke'

G. Spatial/directional

- *glahŋ 'across'
- *chin 'behind'
- *khar 'center'
- *me 'down'
- *s-ŋa 'front'
- *thək 'upright'
- *a-sniŋ 'year'
  - *rta-sniŋ 'last year'
  - *pərniŋ 'next year'

H. Numerals and quantifiers

- *tə 'one'
- *nehs 'two'
- *sohm 'three'
- *b-zi 'four'
- *r-ŋa 'five'

I. Verbs of utterance, body position or function

- *sən; *so 'awaken'
- *klik 'cry'
- *eh 'defecate'
- *si 'die'
- *b-yi 'fart'
- *sas 'laugh'
  - *p-s-rat 'to play'
  - *b-s-res 'toy, plaything'
- *nah 'rest'
- *tsuŋ 'sit'
- *r-ŋəhl; *em; *ruk ~ *ru-t 'sleep'
  - *s-ip 'to put to sleep'
- *p-tshis 'sneeze'
- *s-paŋ 'speak'
- *tsyahŋ 'stand'
- *kəlet 'tickle'
- *r-dzihs 'urinate'
- *who-t 'vomit' < CAUS. of wohs 'to spurt out'
- *gəhr 'weep'

J. Verbs of motion

- *kles 'arrive'
- *rə-t 'bring'
- *plu-s 'climb'
- *huŋ 'come'
- *plu-s 'emerge'
  - *s-plu-t 'cause to emerge, expel'
- *te-s 'fall'
- *s-bur 'fly'
- *z-ba 'go'
- *b-la 'graze'
- *mohŋ 'hide'
- *zok 'run'

K. Verbs of emotion, cognition, perception

- *r-məŋ 'dream'
- *p-tshet 'fear'
- *s-meŋ 'forget'
- *that 'hear'
  - *thas 'to be heard, audible'
- *sən 'know'
- *r-ses 'something, to know how'
- *r-sək 'proud'
- *rəhŋ 'see'
  - *p-tsyu 'to look'
- *s-ŋər; *s-nəm 'smell'
- *b-ris 'tingle'

L. Stative verbs with human patients

- *məhŋ 'drunk'
- *sot 'fat'
- *kre 'hunger'
- *na 'ill'
- *so 'itchy'
- *tshaŋ 'pure'
- *tsos 'thirst'

M. Stative verbs with non-human patients

- *pək 'bad'
- *li 'be'
- *p-se 'bear fruit'
- *s-ta-s 'become'
- *ka 'bitter'
- *pak 'broken'
- *mom 'bud'
- *p-set 'bud'
- *r-pu-s 'burst'
- *zihm; *gim 'cold'
- *s-ta 'collapsed'
- *s-kluŋ 'detach'
- *thəŋ 'dried'
- *yək 'full'
- *p-tsa 'good'
- *s-len 'greasy'
- *piŋ 'green'
- *gis < *s-lis 'heavy'
- *s-gwaŋ 'hole'
- *b-rah 'hot'
- *wyi 'leak'
- *bom 'light'
- *s-lo; *b-re 'long'
- *dzöhl 'loose'
- *mah 'lost'
- *s-dem ~ *them 'low'
- *khət 'matched'
- *sahr 'new'
- *gyahm 'red'
- *mihn 'ripe'
- *tsik 'rotten'
- *lum 'round'
- *p-tsha 'sharp'
- *tun 'short'
- *zim 'small'
- *b-sir 'sour'
- *tuk 'spicy'
- *sli-s 'stale'
- *b-rehk 'sweet'
- *ruhŋ 'thick'
- *plek 'thin'
  - *wa 'to be thin (esp. of boards)'
- *mun 'warm'
- *pal 'white'
  - *plaŋ 'bright, illuminated'

N. Action verbs with human agent

- *s-po 'beat'
- *ŋih 'beg'
- *kəi 'bite'
- *s-mut 'blow'
  - *phut 'to blow with bellows'
- *r-lap 'bore'
- *s-kle(t) 'break'
- *hip 'burn'
- *r-duhp 'butt'
- *ləhŋ 'buy'
  - *b-lot 'to lend to someone'
  - *b-los 'to borrow'
- *guhr 'carry'
- *kloh 'catch'
- *kwa-t 'clothe'
- *r-sat 'comb'
- *phin 'cook'
  - *mihn 'to cook until done'
  - *tso 'to boil'
- *kəp 'cover'
- *pəl 'cut'
  - *kri 'to cut meat'
- *p-syah 'dance'
- *goh 'dig'
- *gəp 'draw water'
- *zya 'eat'
  - *kəi 'to eat things which require chewing'
- *hat 'extract'
- *z-dət 'find'
- *z-dup 'gather'
- *ya 'give'
- *p-set 'grind'
- *r-guh 'guard'
- *tup 'hammer'
- *tsho 'herd'
- *phok 'husk'
- *lut 'insert'
- *tak 'install'
- *r-then 'kick'
- *saht 'kill'
- *kek 'ladle'
- *b-rihm 'lay wall'
- *lep 'lick'
- *dzət 'make'
- *pek 'milk'
- *z-bra-t 'mix'
- *pho-t 'open'
- *phok 'pay'
- *tik 'pick up'
- *s-krəp 'pin closed'
- *p-tsil 'pinch'
- *p-sut 'plug'
- *tek 'press'
- *dzəhk 'put'
  - *nat 'to set down, place'
- *ra-s 'release'
- *phit 'remove from fire'
- *tsep 'ride'
- *s-ŋo 'roast'
- *b-zu 'rub'
  - *p-sil 'to scrub'
- *s-lom 'scald'
- *sim 'scoop'
- *s-pik 'scrape'
  - *pur 'to scratch'
- *s-nan 'seize'
- *p-yet 'sell'
- *s-priŋ 'send'
- *ruhp 'sew'
- *p-yen 'shave'
- *gap 'shoot'
- *s-tən 'show'
- *kok 'skin, peel'
- *phyak 'snap'
- *tshim 'soak'
- *was 'sow seed'
- *khəl 'spin wool'
- *p-si 'split firewood'
- *tser 'squeeze'
- *ku 'steal'
  - *rok 'to ransack, rummage'
- *r-wal 'stir'
- *on 'stop'
- *sit 'sweep'
- *p-sik ~ *p-sis 'teach'
- *p-tsit 'tear'
- *khya 'throw'
- *s-ki 'tie'
- *s-to 'trade'
- *kil 'twist'
- *s-krup 'unfold'
- *bohk 'uproot'
- *tse 'wash'
  - *r-za 'to wash hair'
- *rəhk 'weave'
  - *rihn 'to set up a loom'
- *hul 'whet'
