= Rolpa District =

District in Province No. 5, Nepal

Coordinates: 28°22′N 082°33′E

Rolpa District रोल्पा
- District
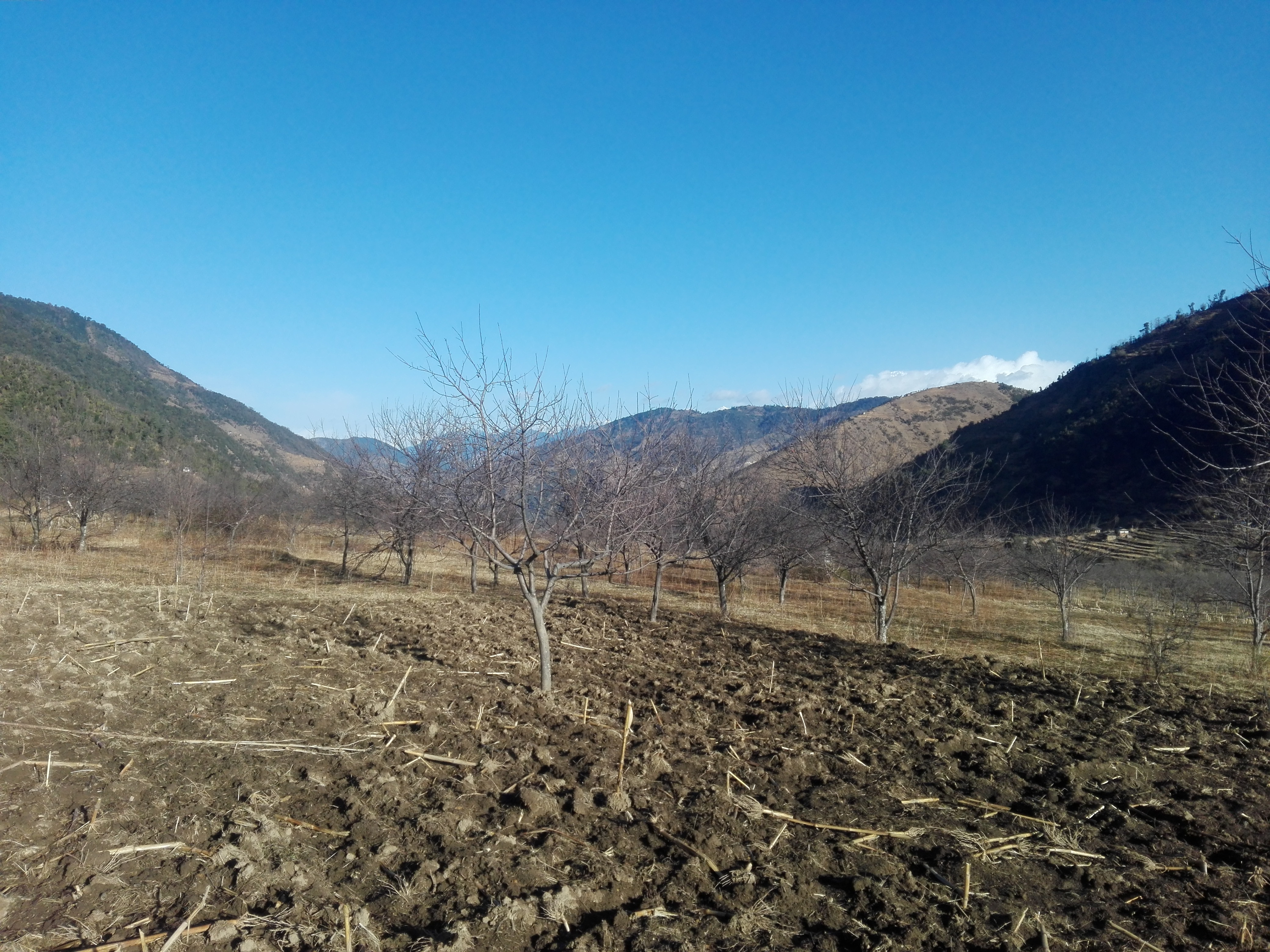
- Apple orchard at Chalabang

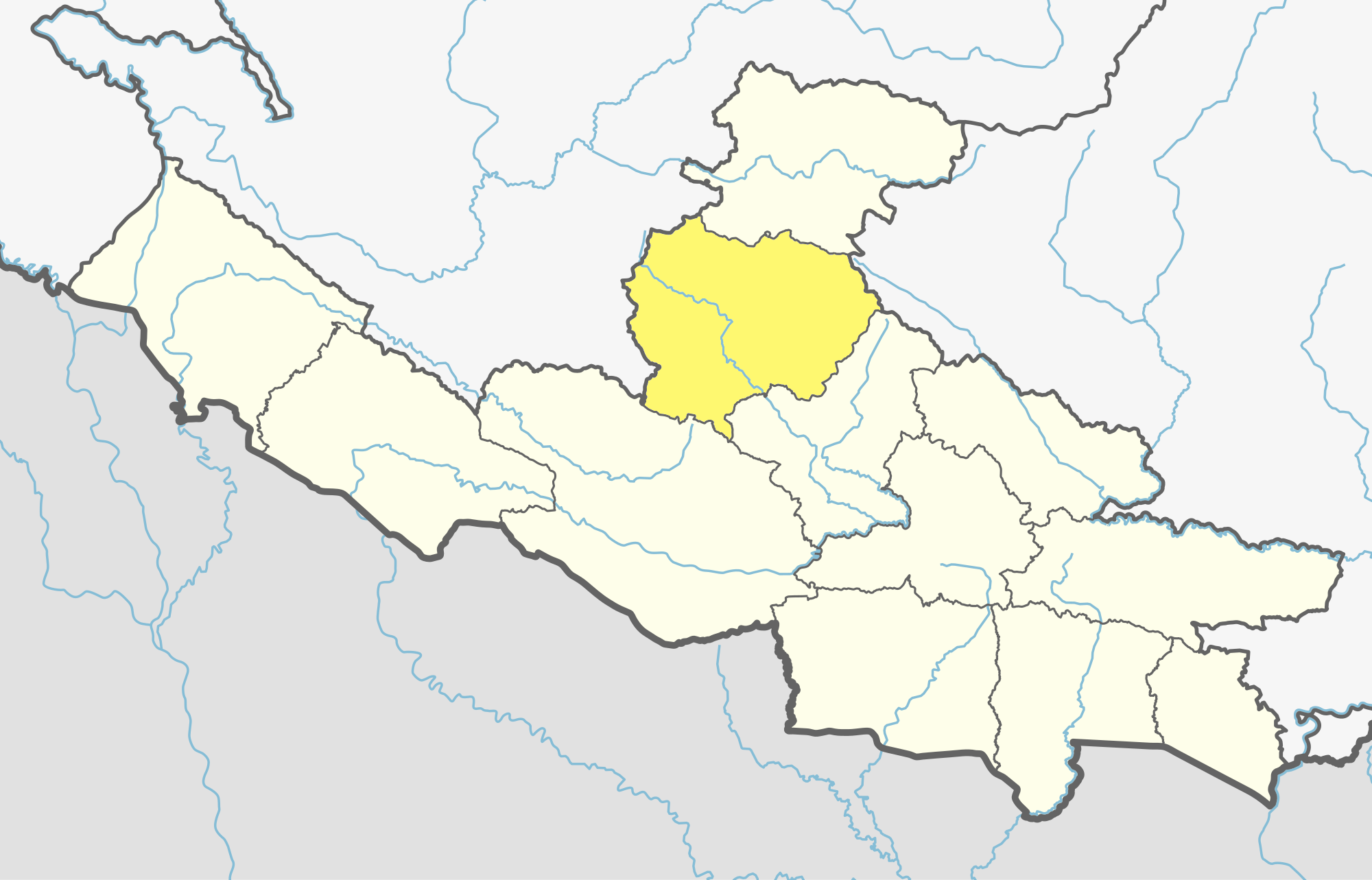
- Location of Rolpa (dark yellow) in Lumbini Province
- Country: Nepal
- Province: Lumbini Province
- Established: 13 April 1961
- Admin HQ.: Rolpa

Government
  - Type: Coordination committee
  - Body: DCC, Rolpa

Area
  - Total: 1,879 km^{2} (725 sq mi)

Population (2015)
  - Total: 221,178
  - Density: 117.7/km^{2} (304.9/sq mi)
- Time zone: UTC+05:45 (NPT)
- Main Language(s): Nepali, Kham Magar, Newari, English
- Website: ddcrolpa.gov.np

Rolpa (Nepali: रोल्पा जिल्ला), is a "hill" district in Lumbini Province of Nepal. Rolpa district covers an area of 1,879 km^{2} (725 sq mi) with population (2011) of 221,177. Rolpa town is the district's administrative center.

The various grievances of Rolpa's population made the district ripe for revolt. It became a "Maoist Stronghold" of the Communist Party of Nepal. In May 2002 a major battle between Maoist guerrillas and the army was fought at Lisne Lekh near the Rolpa-Pyuthan border.

== History ==
The area of Rolpa District was under the Rukumkot (Rukum District) King before 15th century. Tuthansen (King of Salyankot) established a separate kingdom carving out some 18 villages from Rukumkot Kingdom. The new kingdom was named Gajulkot. These 18 villages were given to Tuthansen in dowry by Jayant Berma who was the king of Rukumkot. These ruins are still available to see in Rolpa District.

Rolpa district was part of two different districts Pyuthan District and Salyan District during Rana regime. In 1962, Rolpa district established carving out parts of Pyuthan District and Salyan District.

=== Maoist administration ===
During the Nepali civil war, much of the Rolpa district came under the control of Nepal's Maoist revolutionaries. The installation of a Maoist administration in Rolpa involved revolutionary united front committees which settled local disputes, and many people in Rolpa began to use the Maoist legal administration over the central state's legal outposts. These adminsirations created by the Maoists in Rolpa were based on the 3-in-1 committee system, where 40% of the seats went to the party, another 40% to the population, and 20% to the Maoist armed forces. Gender was important to the Maoist administration in Rolpa, with Maoist forces reporting that if a crime mandated corporal punishment if the crime was carried out by a woman against a man or woman, the punisher would have to be a woman. If it was between two men, both men and women would take part in the punishment, though in cases like spying punishment would be carried out by the armed forces.

The economy of the areas of the district under Maoist control were transformed. As money lenders often left following Maoist entry, the party had to assume control over moneylending practices. As a result, yearly interest rates charged on loans fell from 60-120% to 10-15%, with no interest in cases of those needing loans for grain or if they were sick. Money was also raised by the party administration through taxation, fines, and fees for registering land.

== Administrative divisions ==
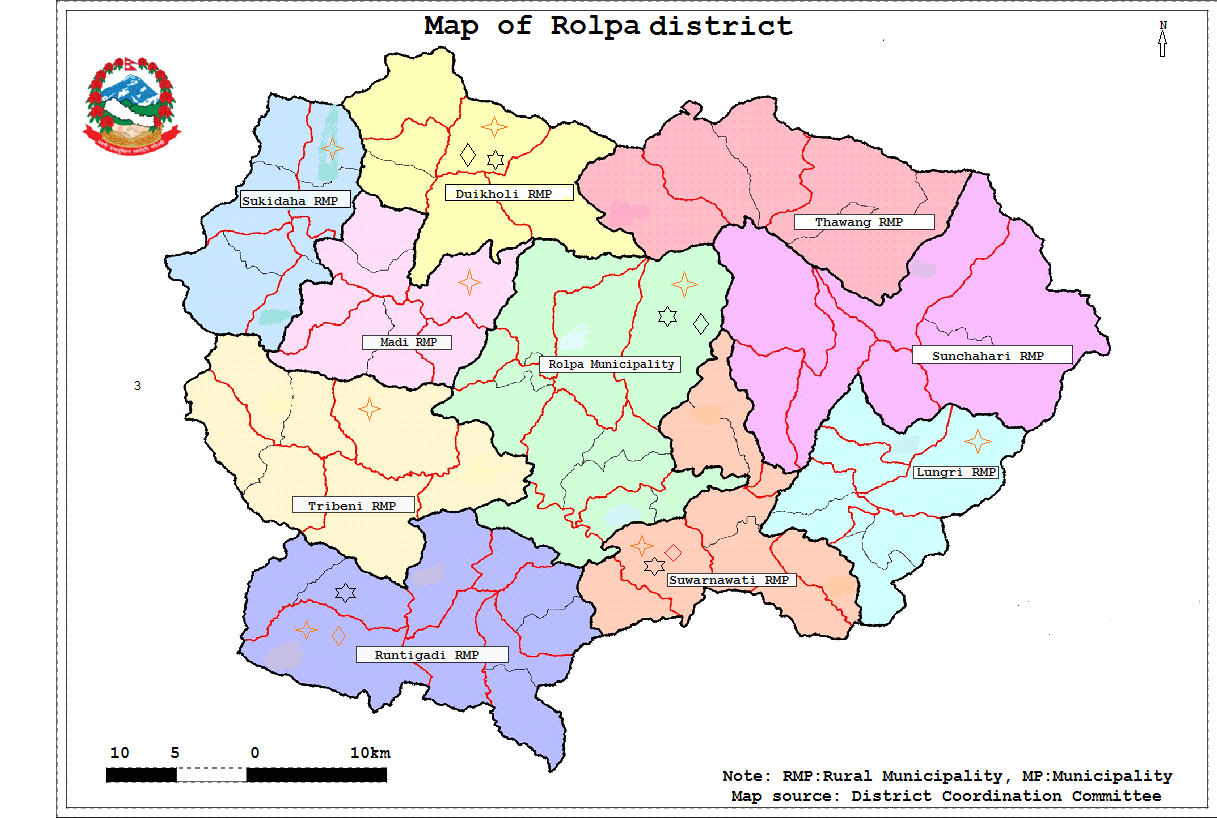
Divisions of Rolpa District

Rolpa district is divided into 10 local level bodies in which nine are rural municipalities and one is municipality:

1. Rolpa Municipality
2. Runtigadhi Rural Municipality
3. Triveni Rural Municipality
4. Sunilsmiriti Rural Municipality (previously: Suwarnawati Rural Municipality)
5. Lungri Rural Municipality
6. Sunchhahari Rural Municipality
7. Thabang Rural Municipality
8. Madi Rural Municipality
9. Gangadev Rural Municipality (previously: Sukidaha Rural Municipality)
10. Paribartan Rural Municipality (previously: Duikholi Rural Municipality)

== Geography and climate ==
Rolpa is drained southward by the Madi Khola from a complex of 3,000 to 4,000 meter ridges about 50 kilometers south of the Dhaulagiri Himalaya. This mountainous barrier historically isolated Rolpa by encouraging travelers between India and Tibet to detour to follow easier routes to the east or west, while east–west travelers found easier routes to the north through Dhorpatan Valley, or to the south through Dang Valley or along the Mahabharat Range.

Climate Zone	Elevation Range	% of Area
Upper Tropical	300 to 1,000 meters 1,000 to 3,300 ft.	3.3%
Subtropical	1,000 to 2,000 meters 3,300 to 6,600 ft.	61.7%
Temperate	2,000 to 3,000 meters 6,400 to 9,800 ft.	31.4%
Subalpine	3,000 to 4,000 meters 9,800 to 13,100 ft.	3.6%

== Demographics ==
At the time of the 2021 Nepal census, Rolpa District had a population of 234,793. 10.26% of the population is under 5 years of age. It has a literacy rate of 75.63% and a sex ratio of 1137 females per 1000 males. 35,376 (15.07%) lived in municipalities.

Castes/ethnic groups in Rolpa district (2021)
1. Magar (42.8%)
2. Chhetri (35.2%)
3. Kami (12.6%)
4. Damai (3.64%)
5. Dasnami (1.54%)
6. Bahun (0.96%)
7. Other Hill Janjati (1.09%)
8. Others (2.26%)

Khas people make up a majority of the population with 55% of the population, of which Khas Dalits are 17% of the population. Hill Janjatis make up 44% of the population, of which Magars are 43% and are the largest single community in the district.

Languages of Rolpa district (2021)
1. Nepali (85.0%)
2. Magar Kham (13.1%)
3. Magar Dhut (1.03%)
4. Others (0.84%)

At the time of the 2021 census, 85.03% of the population spoke Nepali, 13.10% Magar Kham and 1.03% Magar Dhut as their first language. In 2011, 86.1% of the population spoke Nepali as their first language.

Religion in Rolpa District (2021)
Religion	Percent
Hinduism	87.48%
Prakriti	8.21%
Christianity	2.39%
Buddhism	1.76%
Other or not stated	0.16%

=== Population by Census 1971-2021 ===
Sources:

== Historic, cultural, archeological sites ==
- Bhama Odar
- Gari Lake, Jaulipokhari
- Bibang Daha, Gam
- Chaturbhuj Panchayan
- Baraha Khetra Badachaur
- Devi and Khadga Temple, Durga Bhawani, Durga Temple
- Gajulkot
- Jaljala, Jankot Jhankristhan
- Kalika Devi, Khungrikot, Kot Maula
- Pateswari Temple
- Shivalaya Mandir
- Kothi Vheer, Gam
- Murelle lake, Holleri

== Health services ==
Rolpa is one of the most remote district in Nepal in terms of Health services some notable Health care centers being:

- Rolpa District Hospital
- Jeevan Anmol Hospital
- Jan Namuna Hospital
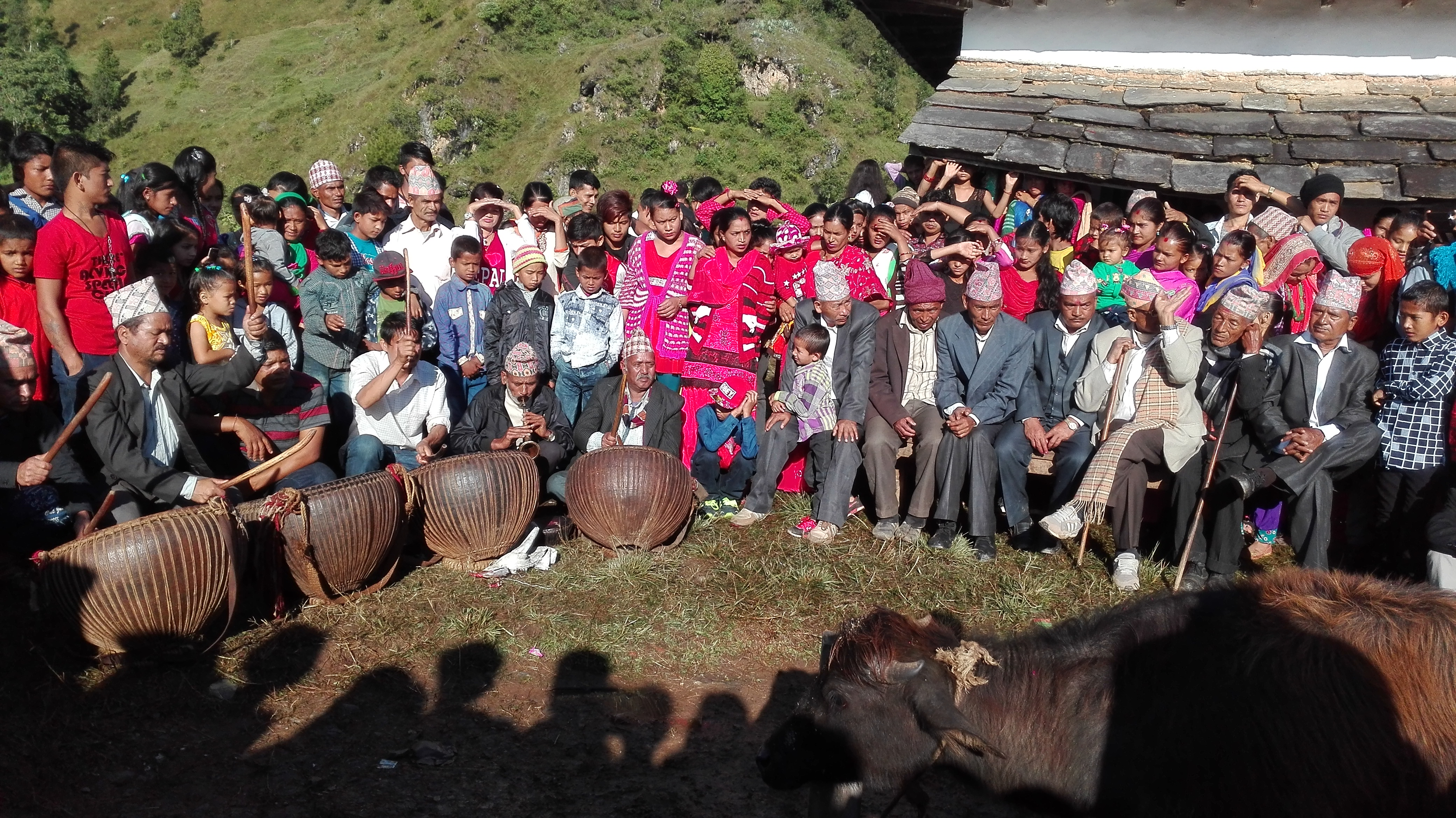
  Dashain Mela is celebrated in Rolpa Gajul kot which is located in Gajul Rolpa.
