= Apihimal Rural Municipality =

Rural Municipality in Sudurpashchim Province, Nepal

Apihimal Rural Municipality अपि हिमाल गाउँपालिका
- Rural Municipality
- Location of Apihimal in province Apihimal Rural Municipality (Nepal)
- Coordinates: 29.86022°N 80.9067°E
- Country: Nepal
- Province: Sudurpashchim Province
- District: Darchula District

Government
  - Type: Local government
  - Chairperson: Bhakta Singh Thekare Bohara
  - Administrative Head: Indra Bahadur Rawal

Area
  - Total: 613.95 km^{2} (237.05 sq mi)

Population (2011 census)
  - Total: 6,779
  - Density: 11.04/km^{2} (28.60/sq mi)
- Time zone: UTC+05:45 (Nepal Standard Time)
- Website: http://apihimalmun.gov.np

Apihimal (Nepali: अपि हिमाल) is a Rural council (Gaupalika) in Darchula District in the Sudurpashchim Province of far-western Nepal. Apihimal has a population of 6779.The land area is 613.95 km^{2}.

== Etymology ==
The rural council has named after the Api (mountain), here the word Himal stands for the Nepali translation of Mountain.

== Geography ==
There are mountains such as Api, Nampa, Kapchuli and Jethi in this rural municipality.
