= Dhungegadhi =

Dhungegadhi ढुङ्गेगढी
- Village Development Committee
- Location in Nepal
- Coordinates: 27.96°N 82.80°E
- Country: Nepal
- Region: Mid-Western
- Zone: Rapti Zone
- District: Pyuthan District
- VDC: Dhungegadhi

Population (2001 Census)
  - Total: 3,180
- 479 households
- Time zone: UTC+5:45 (Nepal Time)

Dhungegadhi is a town and Village Development Committee in Pyuthan, a Middle Hills district of Rapti Zone, western Nepal.

== Etymology ==
dhunge (Nepali: ढुङ्गे) - stony, made of stone
gadhi (Nepali: गढी) - tower, fortress
Thus: stone tower or fortress

== Villages in VDC ==
		Ward	Lat.	Lon	Elev.
Baddanda	बडडाँडा	3	27°58'N	82°50'E	892m
Bahundanda	बाहुनडाँडा		27°56'N	82°47'E	790
Barapani	बरापानी		27°57'N	82°46'E	950
Beldanda	बेलडाँडा		27°57'N	82°49'E	750
Biringkot	बिरिङकोट		27°56'N	82°47'E	1,030
Budhichaur	बुढीचौर		27°58'N	82°48'E	1,270
Chhabise	छबिसे		27°57'N	82°49'E	770
Dansingdanda	दानसिङडाँडा		27°58'N	82°49'E	1,090
Dhankot	धनकोट		27°58'N	82°49'E	1,270
Dhungegadhi	ढुङ्गेगढी	8	27°57'N	82°50'E	938
Dobichaur	दोबीचौर		27°58'N	82°46'E	1,010
Ganaunepani	गनाउनेपानी		27°57'N	82°48'E	770
Goldhara	गोलधारा		27°58'N	82°46'E	1,150
Hattikhal	हात्तिखाल		27°57'N	82°46'E	710
Jaspur	जसपुर		27°57'N	82°48'E	970
Lugluge	लुग्लुगे		27°56'N	82°47'E	730
Mandre	मान्द्रे		27°59'N	82°49'E	970
Mandredhunga	मान्द्रेढुङ्गा		27°59'N	82°50'E	710
Mitheamp	मिठेआँप		27°57'N	82°49'E	490
Pakhapani	पाखापानी	7	27°57'N	82°47'E	850
Pelimati	पेलीमाटी		27°58'N	82°47'E	1,310
Rangbhang	राङभाङ		27°56'N	82°48'E	850
Shrikharka	श्रीखर्क		27°58'N	82°49'E	1,050
Swarakot	स्वाराकोट		27°58'N	82°47'E	1,322
Tarike	तारिके		27°57'N	82°47'E	970
