= Okharkot =

Village Development Committee in Mid-Western, Nepal

Okharkot ओखरकोट khahare
- RM Development Committee
- Nickname: jhimruk
- Location in Nepal
- Coordinates: 28.14°N 82.98°E
- Country: Nepal
- Development Region: Mid-Western
- Zone: Rapti Zone
- District: Pyuthan District
- VDC: Okharkot

Population (2001 Census)
  - Total: 4,484
- 836 households
- Time zone: UTC+5:45 (Nepal Time)

Okharkot is a town and Village Development Committee in Pyuthan, a Middle Hills district of Rapti Zone, western Nepal.

== Etymology ==
Okhar (Nepali: ओखर) - walnut tree (Juglans regia).
kot (Nepali: कोट) - guardroom, prison, police station.

== Villages in this VDC ==
| | | Ward | Lat. | Lon | Elev. |
|---|---|---|---|---|---|
| Ahal | आहाल | 6 | 28°10'N | 83°00'E | 1,089m |
| Aphrekholagaun | आफ्रेखोलागाउँ | | 28°09'N | 82°59'E | 1,205 |
| Arupata | आरुपाटा | | 28°09'N | 82°59'E | 1,045 |
| Badikholagaun | बादीखोलागाउँ | | 28°09'N | 82°59'E | 1,210 |
| Banstari | बाँसटारी | | 28°08'N | 82°58'E | 1,205 |
| Bebare | बेबरे | | 28°10'N | 83°00'E | 1,590 |
| Bhedabari | भेडाबारी | | 28°10'N | 83°00'E | 1,255 |
| Chauke | चौके | 9 | 28°07'N | 82°58'E | 1,542 |
| Chichinne | चिचिन्ने | | 28°07'N | 82°57'E | 1,710 |
| Chudhara | चुधारा | 8 | 28°08'N | 82°58'E | 1,110 |
| Darimchaur | दारिमचौर | 6 | 28°09'N | 82°59'E | 1,030 |
| Dhana | ढाँणा | | 28°09'N | 82°58'E | 1,050 |
| Dhana Bajar | ढाँडाबजार | | 28°09'N | 82°58'E | 995 |
| Hariya | हरिया | | 28°10'N | 82°59'E | 1,170 |
| Kalleri | कल्लेरी | | 28°08'N | 82°59'E | 1,597 |
| Kamdale | कमडाले | | 28°07'N | 82°58'E | 1,642 |
| Kami Tol | कामी टोल | | 28°08'N | 83°00'E | 1,475 |
| Khahare | खहरे | | 28°08'N | 82°59'E | 1,030 |
| Koiralpata | कोइरलपाटा | | 28°09'N | 82°59'E | 1,090 |
| Kubinde | कुबिण्डे | | 28°07'N | 82°58'E | 1,470 |
| Lamasera | लामासेरा | | 28°10'N | 82°59'E | 1,018 |
| Machchhi | मच्छी | 1 | 28°08'N | 82°58'E | 955 |
| Okharkot | ओखरकोट | | 28°08'N | 82°59'E | 1,630 |
| Ratamata | रातामाटा | | 28°08'N | 83°00'E | 1,538 |
| Ripapakha | रिपापाखा | 7 | 28°08'N | 82°58'E | 1,045 |
| Rotepani | रोटेपानी | | 28°09'N | 82°59'E | 1,170 |
| Salleri | सल्लेरी | | 28°08'N | 82°58'E | 1,610 |
| Samaldhara | समलधारा | | 28°10'N | 82°59'E | 1,418 |
| Sisnekholagaun | सिस्नेखोलागाउँ | | 28°09'N | 83°00'E | 1,285 |
| Swanbota | स्वाँबोटा | | 28°08'N | 82°58'E | 955 |
| Tada Pokhari | टाडा पोखरी | | 28°08'N | 82°58'E | 1,285 |
| Tari | टारी | | 28°07'N | 82°59'E | 1,285 |
| Tilahalna | तिलाहाल्ना | 7 | 28°08'N | 82°57'E | 955 |

Machcchī is the VDC's administrative center at the confluence of Dharmawati River and Gartang Khola. Okharkot village with its ancient fortress sits on a ridgetop 2 km. east and some 675 meters (2200 feet) higher. It is listed in IUCN's inventory of historic sites.
