= Saipal =

Mountain in Nepal

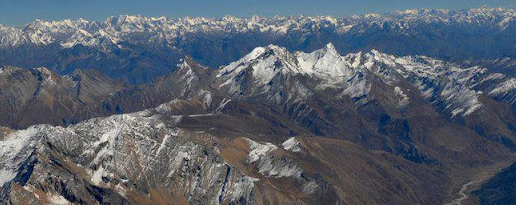
- Aerial view of Saipal

Highest point
- Elevation: 7,031 m (23,068 ft)
- Prominence: 1,824 m (5,984 ft)
- Listing: Mountains of Nepal; Ultra
- Coordinates: 29°53′16″N 81°29′41″E

Geography
- Location within Sudurpashchim Province Location within Nepal
- Location: Sudurpashchim Province, Nepal
- Country: Nepal
- Province: Sudurpashchim
- Parent range: Western Nepal Himalaya

Climbing
- First ascent: 1960 Sangay Thinlay

Saipal is a mountain in the Himalayas of north-west Bajhang district in Nepal.

Api, Nampa and Saipal are a trio of high mountains located in northwestern Nepal. Together they form a small range of sharp, icy peaks, rising from a long, steep, snowy crest.

== See also ==
- List of ultras of the Himalayas
