= Baraula =

Baraula बरौला
- Village Development Committee
- Location in Nepal
- Coordinates: 27.98°N 82.94°E
- Country: Nepal
- Region: Mid-Western
- Zone: Rapti Zone
- District: Pyuthan District
- VDC: Baraula

Population (2001 Census)
  - Total: 3,380
- 599 households
- Time zone: UTC+5:45 (Nepal Time)

Baraula is a town and Village Development Committee in Pyuthan, a Middle Hills district of Rapti Zone, western Nepal.

== Villages in VDC ==
		Ward	Lat.	Lon	Elev.
Baraula	बरौला		28°00'N	82°57'E	782m
Baraulkot	बरौलाकोट		28°00'N	82°56'E	1,163
Chidi Damar	चिडी दमार		27°57'N	82°54'E	410
Chaukaha	चौकाहा		28°00'N	82°57'E	610
Harbung	हरबुङ		27°59'N	82°56'E	1,230
Hariyagaun	हरियागाउँ		28°01'N	82°56'E	630
Hariyatari	हरियाटारी		28°01'N	82°56'E	658
Jadi	जाडी		28°00'N	82°56'E	819
Kadkura	कडकुरा		27°59'N	82°57'E	610
Kattike	कात्तिके		27°57'N	82°56'E	858
Khal Kamere	खाल कमेरे		27°57'N	82°55'E	550
Khasbas	खसबास		28°00'N	82°56'E	770
Kumal Takura	कुमाल टाकुरा		27°58'N	82°55'E	850
Lami Damar	लामी दमार	3	27°57'N	82°56'E	490
Lede	लेडे		27°57'N	82°55'E	570
Lungchung	लुङचुङ		27°59'N	82°58'E	1,170
Malbang	मलबाङ		28°00'N	82°57'E	650
Masina	मसिना	3	27°57'N	82°56'E	730
Nepane	नेपाने		27°59'N	82°56'E	1,490
Ranibans	रानीबास		27°58'N	82°56'E	1,350
Salendhara	सलेनधारा		27°58'N	82°57'E	1,390
Sikhre	सिख्रे		27°57'N	82°55'E	650
Sisne	सिस्ने		27°59'N	82°57'E	1,030
Thulilek	ठूलीलेक		27°58'N	82°57'E	1,610
Upallagaun	उपल्लागाउँ		28°01'N	82°56'E	635
Wabang	वाबाङ		27°59'N	82°57'E	950
Wabas	वाबास		27°57'N	82°56'E	1,190
Wakhari	वखारी	2	27°59'N	82°56'E	952
