= Tomaž Humar =

Slovenian mountaineer

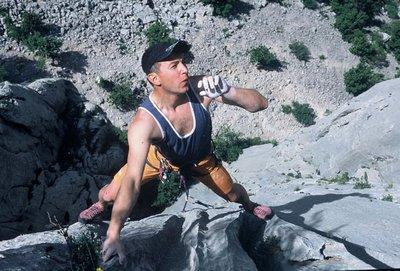
- Born: February 18, 1969; Kamnik, SR Slovenia, Yugoslavia
- Died: November 10, 2009 (aged 40); Langtang Lirung, Nepal
- Occupation: Mountaineer
- Children: 2
- Website: www.humar.com

Tomaž Humar (February 18, 1969 – c. November 10, 2009), nicknamed Gozdni Joža (akin to Hillbilly), was a Slovenian mountaineer. A father of two, Humar lived in Kamnik, Slovenia. He completed over 1500 ascents, and won a number of mountaineering and other awards, including the Piolet d'Or in 1997 for his Ama Dablam ascent.

== Climbing career ==
Humar began climbing at 18 with the Kamnik Mountain Club. He became widely recognized in 1999 after his attempt on the south face of Dhaulagiri,, which although unsuccessful, was considered by Reinhold Messner as "the most important ascent of the decade".

During a solo attempt to climb Nanga Parbat in 2005, Humar became trapped by avalanches and melting snow at an altitude of nearly 6000 meters. After six days in a snow cave he was rescued by a Pakistan Army helicopter crew on August 10, 2005.

On October 28, 2007, Humar reached the Eastern summit of Annapurna via a route at the far eastern end of the South Face.

=== Accident and death ===
On November 9, 2009, Humar, who was on a solo climb via the South Face of Langtang Lirung (last climbed in 1995), had an accident during the descent. He contacted his base camp staff via a satellite phone on the day of the accident, relaying that he was in critical condition with leg, spine and rib injuries, and fearing he was going to die. The next morning he contacted them again, only saying a few words before the line cut off. He was thought to be on the mountain at an elevation of approximately 6,300 meters (20,700 ft), but a helicopter failed to spot him. Several days later his body was found at an elevation of 5,600 meters (18,400 ft).

== Prominent expeditions ==
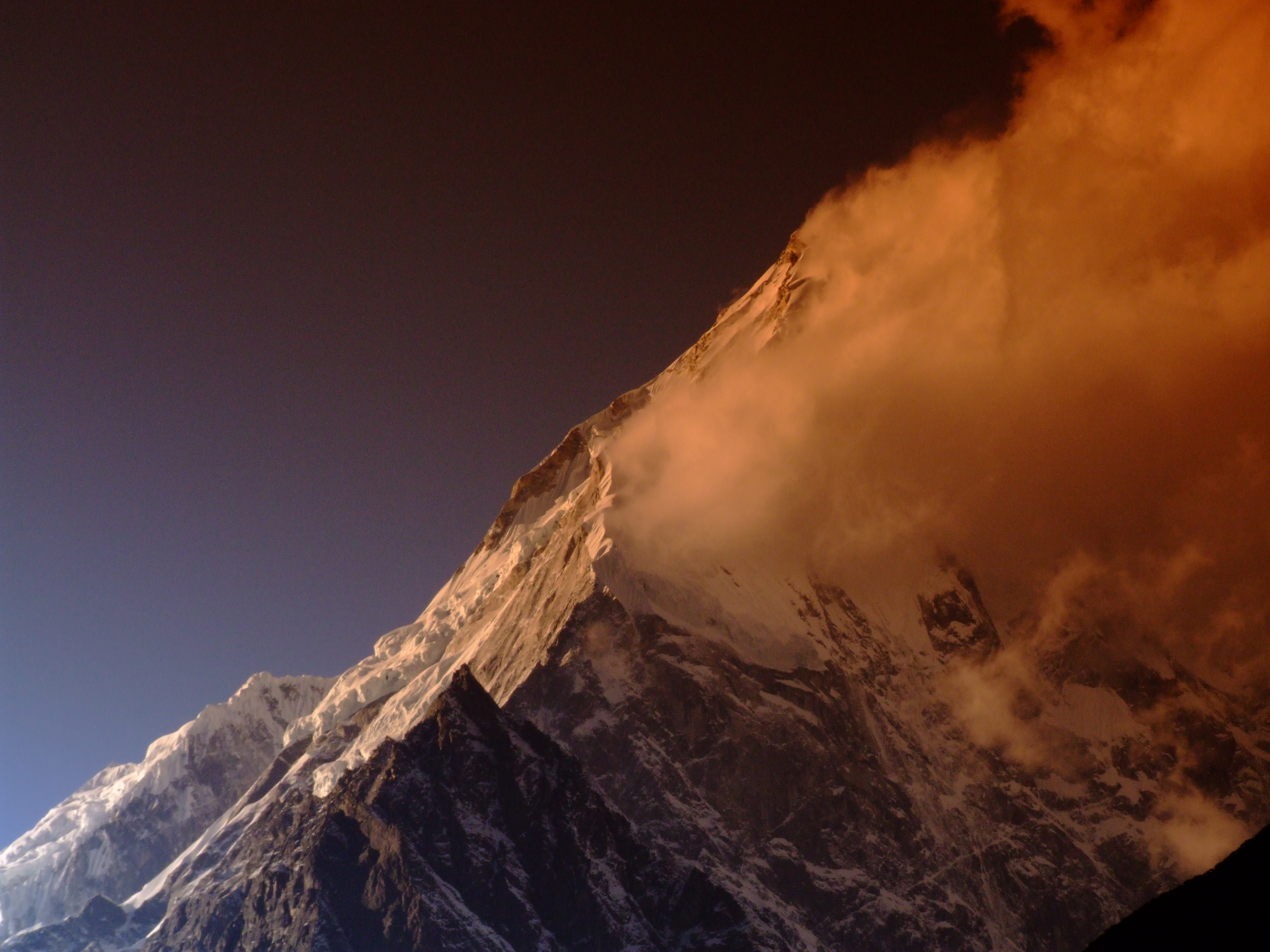
Langtang Lirung

- 13. November 1994: Ganesh V (6770 m), in Ganesh Himal, new variation on SE face, with Stane Belak-Šrauf
- 6. May 1995: Annapurna (8091 m), N face, French Route, solo climb (the only traditional expedition in which he participated)
- 4. May 1996: Ama Dablam (6828 m), new route on NW face, with Vanja Furlan
- 2. November 1996: Bobaye (6808 m), 1st ascent of the summit, NW face, new route "Golden Heart", solo climb
- 1. October 1997: Lobuche East (6119 m), NE face, new route "Talking About Tsampa", with Janez Jeglič and Carlos Carsolio
- 9-11. October 1997: Pumori (7165 m), SE face attempt of new route up to 6300 m - then after participation in rescue action at N reached the summit by normal route), with Janez Jeglič, Marjan Kovač
- 31. October 1997: Nuptse West top (NW, 7742 m), W face, new route, with Janez Jeglič (who died during descent)
- 26. October 1998: El Capitan (2307 m) (Yosemite), route Reticent Wall A4-A5, 3rd solo climb (1st solo by non-American)
- 2. November 1999: Dhaulagiri (8167 m), new route on S face (up to 8000 m, without reaching the top), solo climb
- 26. October 2002: Shisha Pangma, (8046 m), with Maxut Zhumaiev, Denis Urubko, Aleksej Raspopov, Vassiliy Pivtsov
- June 2003: Nanga Parbat (8125 m), his first attempt to climb Rupal (S) Face, up to ca. 6000 m
- 22. December 2003: Aconcagua (6960 m), S face, new route with Aleš Koželj
- October 2004: Jannu (7711 m), E face, attempt solo up to 7000 m
- 23. April 2005: Cholatse (6440 m), NE face 2nd ascent with new variation, with Aleš Koželj, Janko Oprešnik
- Aug 2005: Nanga Parbat (8125 m), attempt to solo climb Rupal (S) Face, up to 7000 meters (with famous helicopter rescue action - see main text above)
- October 2006: Baruntse (7129 m), W face of SE ridge, solo
- 28. October 2007: Annapurna (8091 m), S face, new route, solo climb
- (ca.) 8. November 2009: Langtang Lirung (7227 m), S face solo attempt, died during descent

== Bibliography ==
- Tomaz Humar: Black Rock. The Northwest Face of Bobaye. "American Alpine Journal", Vol. 1997, pp. 17–18
- Tomaz Humar: Nuptse West Face. "American Alpine Journal", Vol. 1998, pp. 3–10
- Tomaž Humar: Ni nemogočih poti. Mobitel, Ljubljana 2001. (ISBN 961-6403-23-0) COBISS 112438016 (in Slovene), 207 pages
- Tomaž Humar: No Impossible Ways (transl. Tamara Soban). Mobitel, Ljubljana 2001. (ISBN 961-6403-23-0), 104 pages
