= Sudurpashchim Province =

Province of Nepal

Sudurpashchim Province सुदूरपश्चिम प्रदेश
- Province
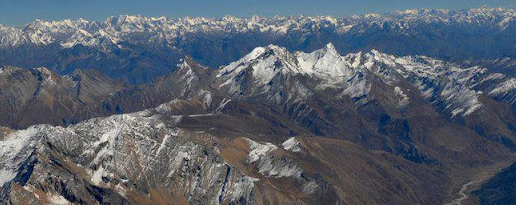
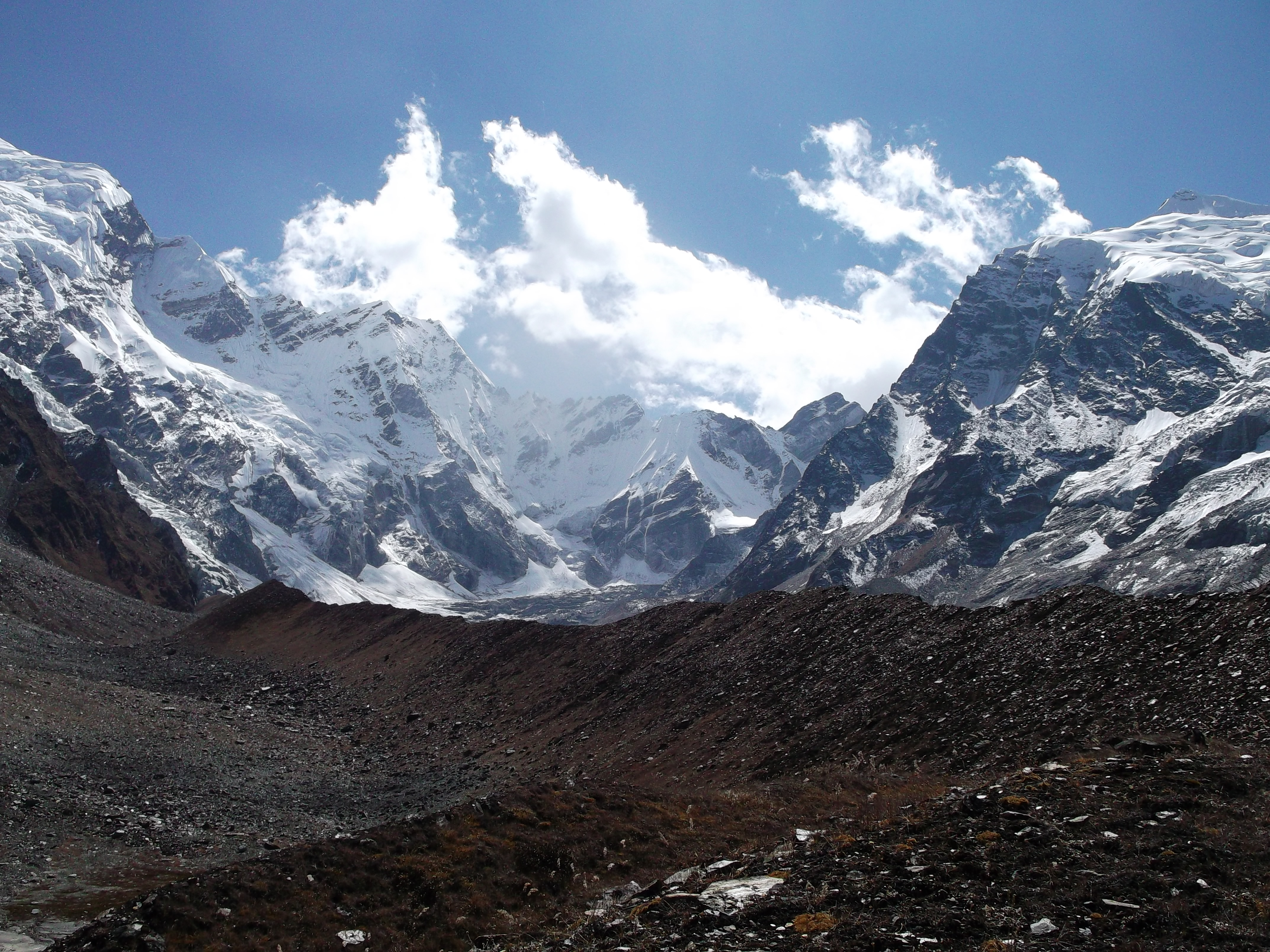
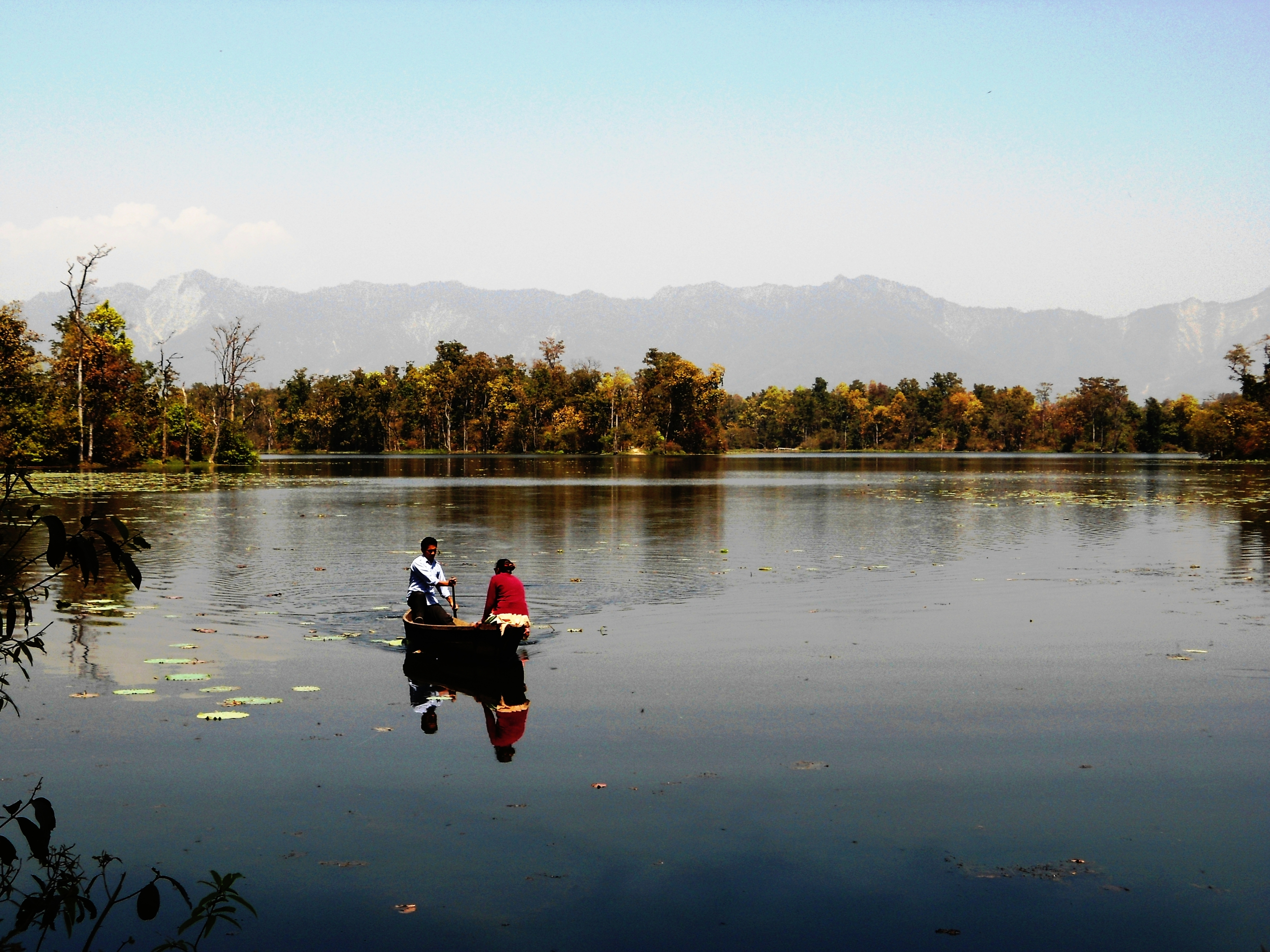
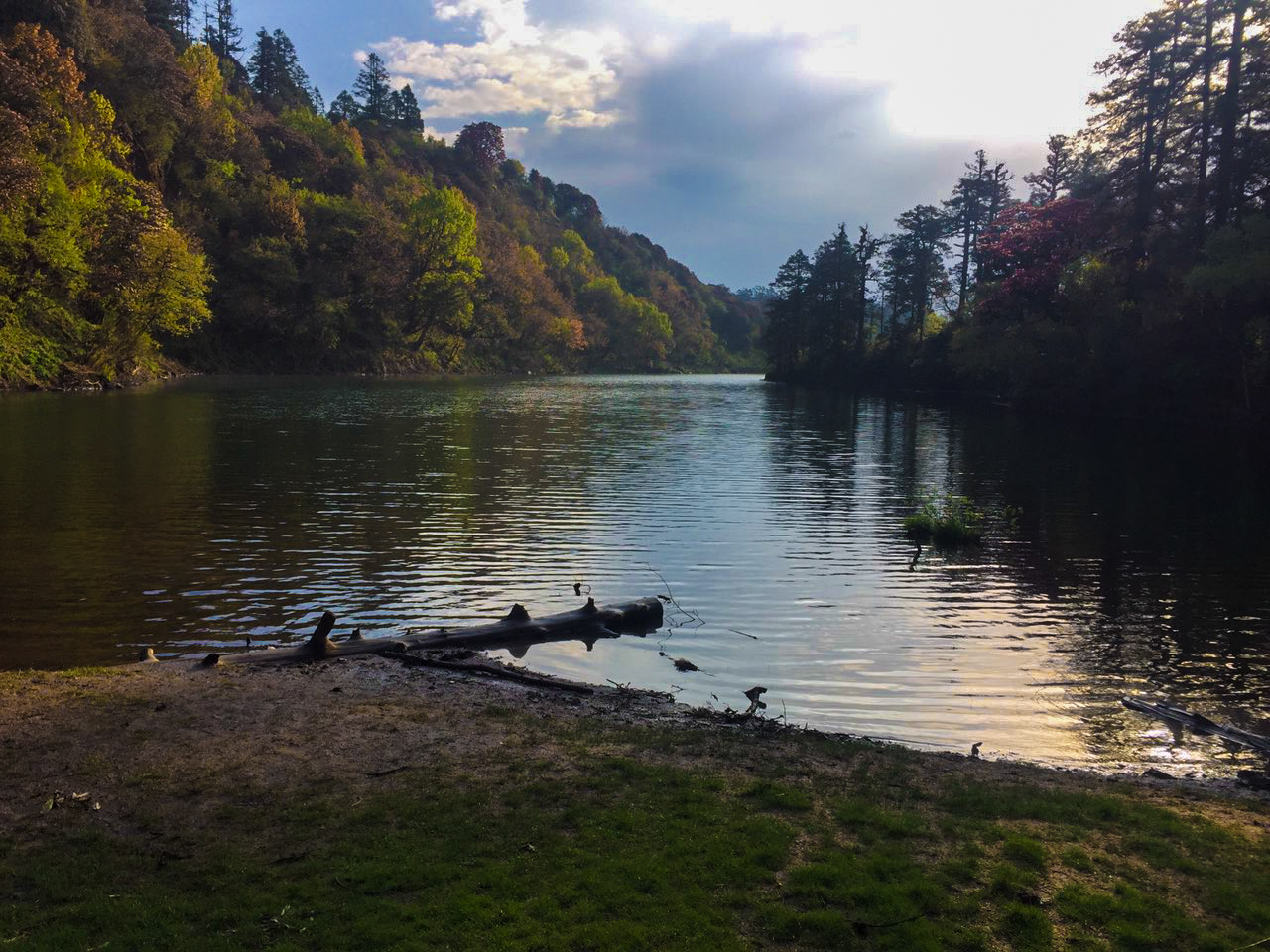
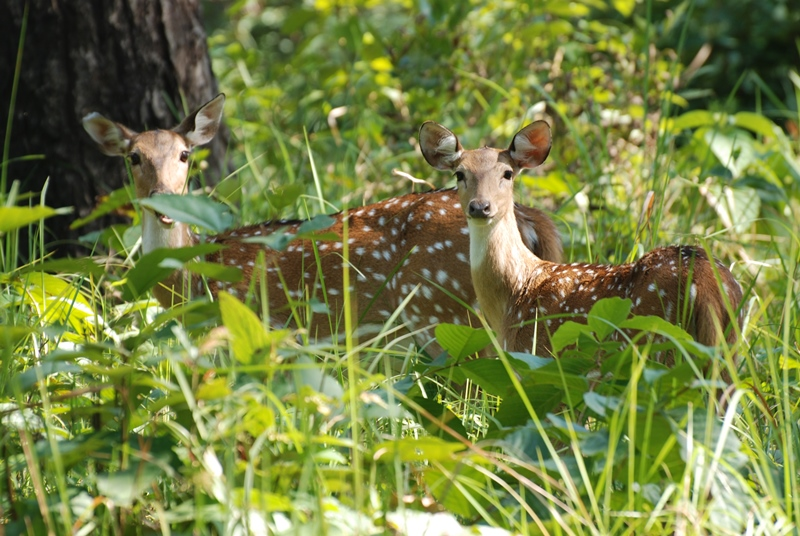
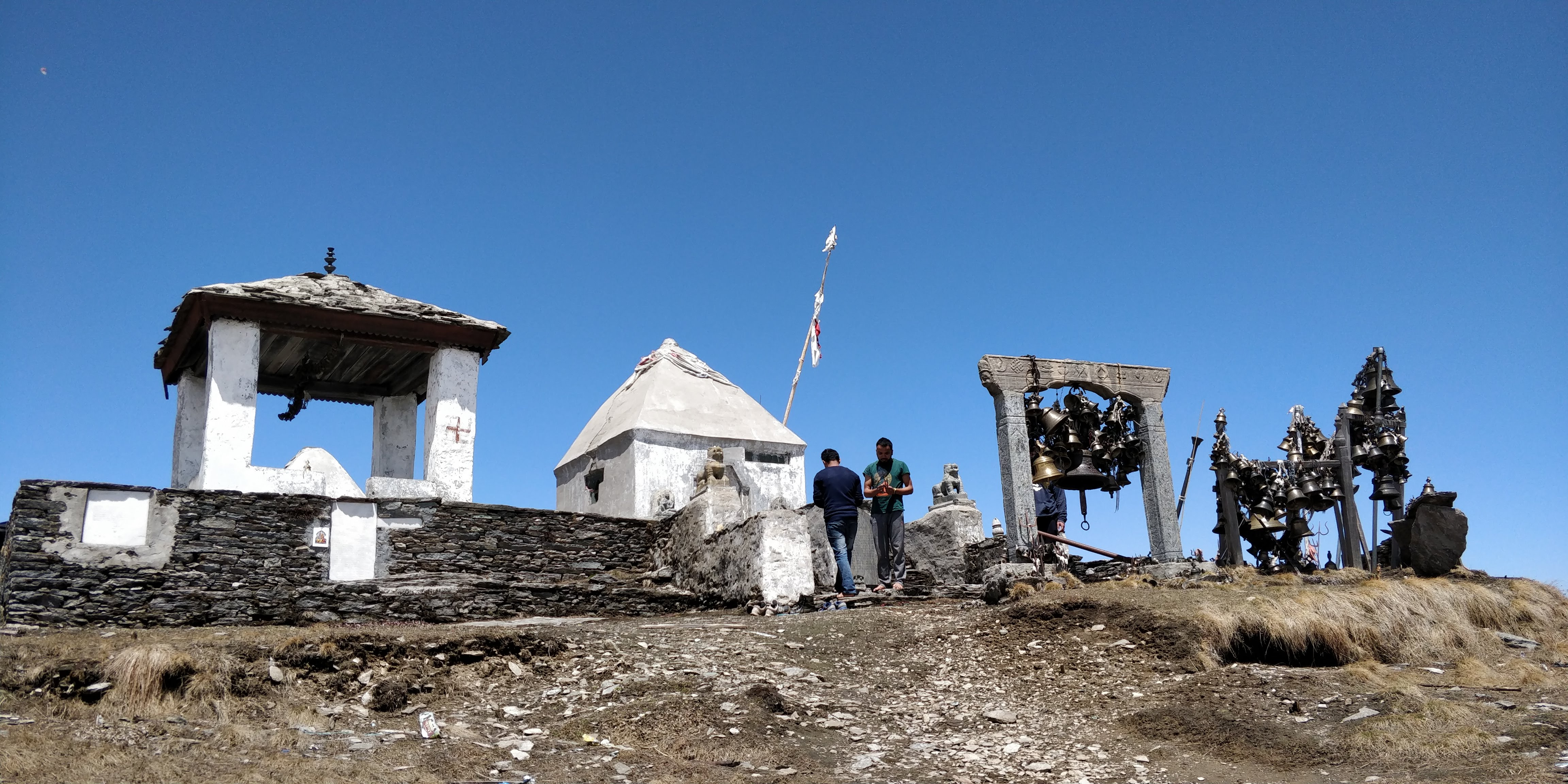
- Clockwise from top Saipal, Ghodaghodi Lake, Swamp deer at Shuklaphanta National Park, Badimalika Temple, Khaptad Lake, Api Himal

- Seal
- Etymology: Farwest Region
- Motto: Collaborate Locally to Compete Globally
- Location of Sudurpashchim Province (claimed Kalapani territory in light red)

- Divisions of Sudurpashchim Province (claimed Kalapani territory in Darchula District marked)
- Coordinates: 28°42′12″N 80°34′01″E
- Country: Nepal
- Formation: 20 September 2015
- Capital Temporary capital: Godawari; Dhangadhi
- Largest city: Dhangadhi
- Districts: 9

Government
  - Type: Self governing province
  - Body: Government of Sudurpashchim Province
  - Governor: Najir Miya
  - Chief Minister: Khag Raj Bhatta
  - High Court: Dipayal High Court
  - Provincial Assembly: Unicameral (53 seats)
  - Parliamentary constituency: House of Representatives (16 seats); National Assembly (8 seats)

Area (Note: 19,999.28 km^{2} (7,721.77 sq mi) including claimed territory.)
  - Province: 19,999.28 km^{2} (7,721.77 sq mi)
  - Rank: 6th
- Highest elevation ( Mount Api): 7,132 m (23,399 ft)
- Lowest elevation: 109 m (358 ft)

Population (2021)
  - Province: 2,694,783
  - Rank: 5th
  - Density: 134.7440/km^{2} (348.9854/sq mi)
  - Rank: 5th
  - Urban: 62.4%
  - Rural: 37.6%
- Demonym: Sudur Pashchimeli Nepali
- Time zone: UTC+5:45 (NST)
- Geocode: NP-SE
- Official language: Nepali
- Other Official language(s): 1. Doteli; 2. Tharu (Rana)
- HDI: 0.478 (low)
- Literacy: ▲76.2% (2024)
- Sex ratio: 91.25 ♂ /100 ♀ (2011)
- GDP: US$3.5 billion
- GDP rank: 6th
- Website: sudurpashchim.gov.np

Sudurpashchim Province (Nepali: सुदूरपश्चिम प्रदेश, romanized: Sudūrapaścima pradeśa, lit. 'Far-West Province') is one of the seven provinces established by the new constitution of Nepal which was adopted on 20 September 2015. It borders the Tibet Autonomous Region of China to the north, Karnali Province and Lumbini Province to the east, and India's states of Uttarakhand and Uttar Pradesh to the west and south, respectively. The province covers an area of 19,999.28 km^{2} (7,721.77 mi^{2}), or about 13.55% of the country's total area.

Initially known as Province No. 7, the newly elected Provincial Assembly adopted Sudurpashchim Province as the permanent name for the province in September 2018. As per a 28 September 2018 Assembly voting, the city of Godawari was declared the capital of the province, but Dhangadhi serves as the temporary capital. The province is coterminous with the former Far-Western Development Region, Nepal. The three major cities in terms of population and economy are Dhangadhi, Bhimdutta (Mahendranagar), and Tikapur.

== History ==
Topography of Sudurpashchim Province

Doti was an ancient kingdom in the far western region of Kumaon which was formed after the disintegration of the Katyuri Kingdom of Kumaon around the 13th century. Doti was one of eight different princely states the Katyuri Kingdom was divided into eight for their eight prince's and became different independent kingdoms; Baijnath-Katyuri, Dwarahat, Doti, Baramandal, Askot, Sira, Sora, Sui (Kali Kumaon). Later on, the whole land between Ramganga on the west (Uttarakhand) and the Karnali on the east (which divides the far western region from other parts of Nepal), came under the Raikas after the origin of Raikas of Katyuris in Doti. "Brahma Dev Mandi" at Kanchanpur District of Mahakali Zone was established by Katyuri king Brahma Dev.

=== Raikas of Doti ===
Niranjan Malla Dev was the founder of Doti Kingdom around the 13th century after the fall of the Katyuri Kingdom. He was the son of Last Katyuris of united Katyuris kingdom.

Kings of Doti were called Raikas (also Rainka Maharaj).

=== Mughal invasion ===
During the period of Akbar's rule in the 16th century, the Mughals had attacked the Raikas of Doti. They invaded Ajemeru, the capital of the Raika Kingdom. Ajemeru is now in Dadeldhura District of the far western region of Nepal. Hussain Khan, army chief of Akbar residing in Lucknow had led the attack. According to `Abd al-Qadir Badayuni (c. 1540–1615), Indo-Persian historian during Mughal Empire, Mughal Army chief of Lucknow, Hussian Khan, lured by the wealth and treasures of the kingdom of the Raikas, wanted to plunder the region, this being the motive behind the assault, but they did not succeed.

=== Khairgarh-Singhai State ===
Raja Deep Shahi was expelled from Nepal in 1790 A.D and on arriving at Terai of Oudh (now Lakhimpur Kheri District of Uttar Pradesh of India) he established Khairgarh-Singhai State in Khairigarh under British India.

== Geography ==
Sudurpashchim Province covers 19,539 km^{2} i.e. 13.22% of the total area of the country. In the total area of the province, the mountainous terrain is 7,932.834 square km. (40.60%), hilly terrain 6,748.7706 km^{2}. (34.54%) and Terai area is 4,857.3954 km^{2}. (24.86%) belongs to This province has more mountainous and mountainous terrain. This province is located in the far western part of the state of Nepal. Two districts of this province (Kailali and Kanchanpur) are located in Terai region, four (Doti, Dadeldhura, Achham, and Baitadi) are in hilly region and three (Darchula, Bajhang, and Bajura) are in the Himalayan region. Karnali River flows in the east, Seti River in the mid and Mahakali River flows to the west of this province.

In addition to its directly administered territory in Sudurpashchim Pradesh, Nepal claims the Indian-administered territories of Kalapani and northern Kuthi Valley, which it jointly calls "Kalapani–Lympiadhura territory". The Government of Nepal websites give the area of 19,999.28 km^{2} for the province including these territories.

=== Mountains ===
Mt. Api (7132 m.), Mt. Saipal (7025m), Bobaye(6,808m), Nampa (6755m), Om Parvat (5590m) and Jethi Bahurani (6850m) are the major mountain peaks of this province.

Highest peaks of Sudurpaschim Province
Mountains	Elevation (meters)	District	Range	Additional information
Api	7,132	Darchula District	Yoka Pahar Gurans Himal	First ascent in 1960 AD
Saipal	7,031	Bajhang District	Western Nepal Himalaya	First ascent in 1960 AD
Jethi Bahurani	6,850	Darchula/Bajhang	Himalayas	First ascent in 1978 AD
Bobaye	6,808	Darchula/Bajhang	Byas Rishi Himal	First ascent in 1996 AD
Nampa	6,755	Darchula	Gurans	First ascent in 1972 AD
Om Parvat	5,590	Darchula	Himalayas	First ascent in 2004 AD

== Government and administration ==
The Governor acts as the head of the province while the Chief Minister is the head of the provincial government. The Chief Judge of the Dipayal High Court is the head of the judiciary. The present Governor, Chief Minister and Chief Judge are Ganga Prasad Yadav (governor), Khag Raj Bhatta (chief minister) and Yagya Prasad Basyal. The province has 53 provincial assembly constituencies and 16 House of Representative constituencies.

Sudurpashchim Province has a unicameral legislature, like all of the other provinces in Nepal. The term length of the provincial assembly is five years. The Provincial Assembly of Sudurpashchim Province is temporarily housed at the District Coordination Committee Hall in Dhangadhi.

== Administrative subdivisions ==
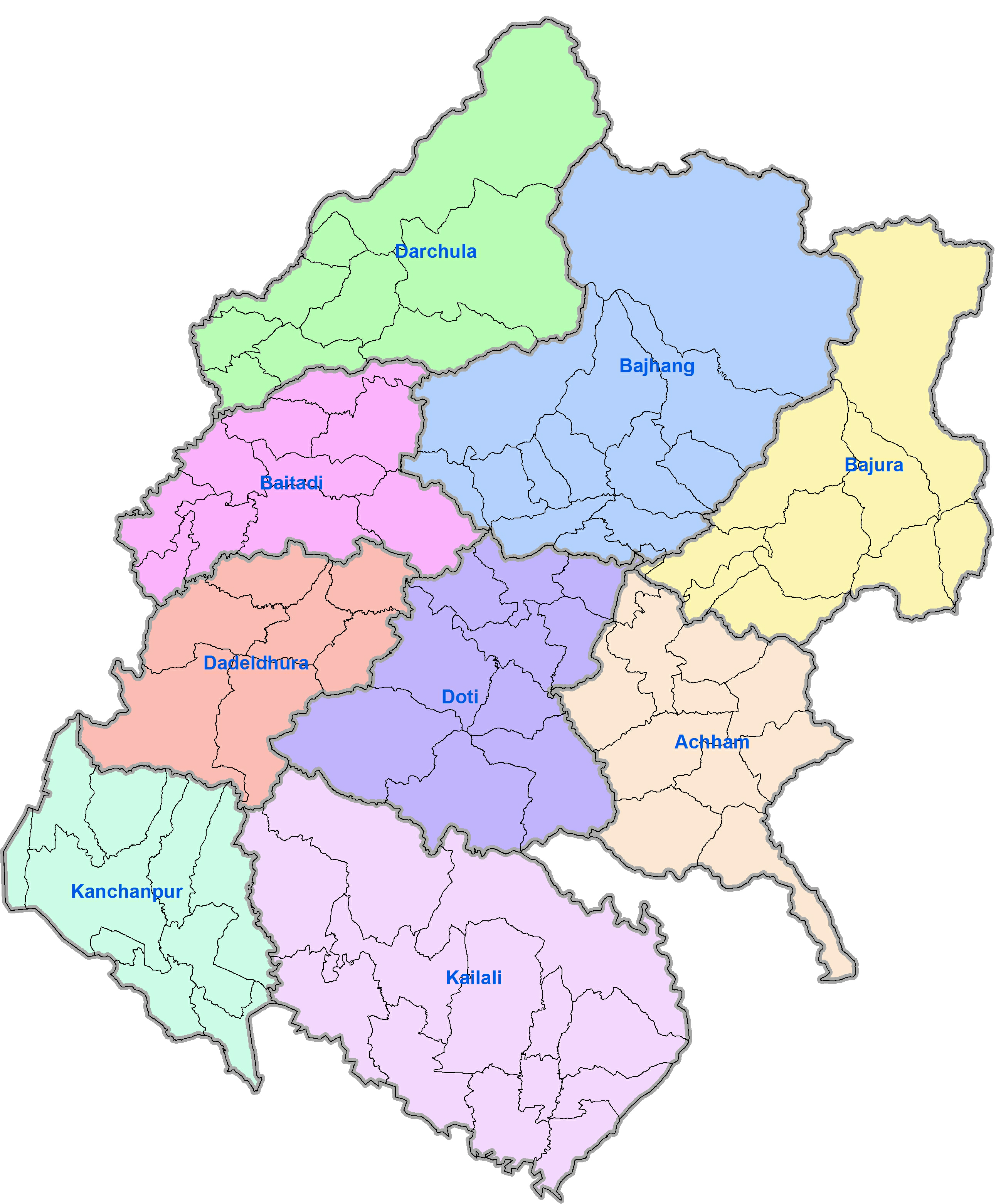
District map of Sudurpashchim Province

The province is divided into nine districts, which are listed below. A district is administrated by the head of the District Coordination Committee and the District Administration Officer. The districts are further divided into municipalities or rural municipalities. The municipalities include one sub-metropolitan city and 33 municipalities. There are 54 rural municipalities in the province.

1. Achham District
2. Baitadi District
3. Bajhang District
4. Bajura District
5. Dadeldhura District
6. Darchula District
7. Doti District
8. Kailali District
9. Kanchanpur District

== Tourism ==
=== Baidyanath Dham ===
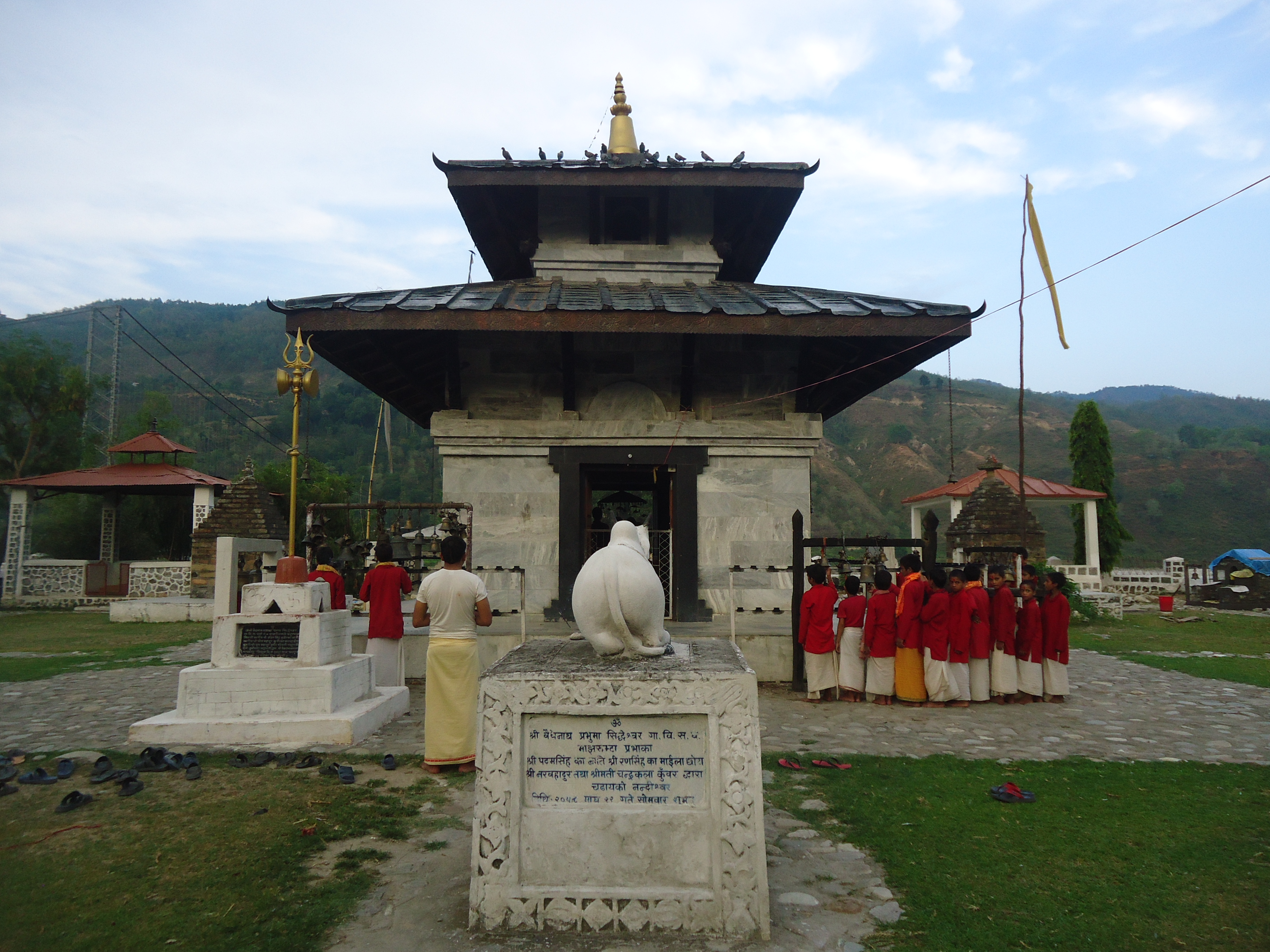
Baidyanath Dham

Baidyanath Dham, one of the four shrines of Nepal, is a shrine of Shiva located in Achham District in the confluence of the Budhi Ganga and Saraswati rivers in Achham district. The shrine has a school to teach Ved called Ved Bidyashram. In 2020, the government allocated NPR 2 million for Baidyanath Dham to upgrade Ved Bidyashram.

== Education ==
According to the census of 2021, Sudurpashchim's literacy rate is 76.2%. 83.6% of males and 69.4% of females are literate.

Sudurpaschim University is a university in Nepal, located in Mahendranagar, Kanchanpur. It was established in August 2010 (2067 BS) by the Act of the Constituent Assembly by the Government of Nepal. It came into operation in 2011, after the appointment of the university officials. Additionally, the Agriculture Dean and branch is served in Tikapur. Prime Minister of Nepal serves as the Chancellor of the university.

Shaheed Dashrath Chand National University of Health Sciences

Geta Medical College, which is located in Dhangadhi, Kailali district of Nepal, is set to be promoted as Nepal's first national health science university. The university will be named after Shaheed Dasharath Chand, a martyr in Nepal's struggle for democracy. Prime Minister Pushpa Kamal Dahal, also known as Prachanda, announced this during a program organized by Geta Medical College. By Ashadh 2080, 12 structures' construction projects are expected to be finished. The college's construction has cost a total of Rs 5.4 billion so far.

Kailali Multiple Campus

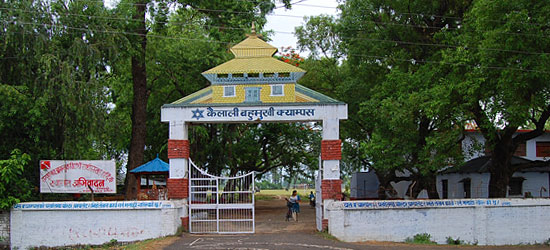
Kailali Multiple Campus

- Kailali Multiple Campus (Nepali: कैलाली बहुमुखी क्याम्पस) is one of the constituent campuses of Far-western University located in Dhangadi of western Nepal. The campus was established in 1980 as a constituent campuses of Tribhuvan University, however the affiliation was changed in 2021 based on government decision. The campus is recognized by University Grants Commission since 2075 BS (2018–2019).

Doti Multiple Campus

- Doti Multiple Campus (Nepali: डोटी बहुमुखी क्याम्पस) is one of the constituent campuses of Tribhuvan University located in Doti district of western Nepal. The campus was established in 1961(2017 BS). It is recognized by University Grants Commission (Nepal)

== Sports ==
- The Dhangadhi city has its own cricket league, Dhangadhi Premier League. Dhangadhi Rangsala with a capacity of 10,000+ spectators is the football stadium in the city. The Khaptad Gold Cup is held in the stadium. DPL is held on Fapla International Cricket Ground.

== Demographics ==
In the 2021 census, Sudurpaschim Province had a population of 2,694,783. 8.87% of the population is under 5 years of age. It has a literacy rate of 76.23% and a sex ratio of 1117 females per 1000 males.

=== Ethnic groups ===
Ethnicities/castes of Sudurpashchim Pradesh (2021)
1. Chhetri (41.8%)
2. Tharu (14.8%)
3. Hill Brahmin (12.7%)
4. Kami (10.8%)
5. Thakuri (4.87%)
6. Damai (3.76%)
7. Rana Tharu (3.05%)
8. Sarki (2.81%)
9. Magar (1.96%)
10. Other Hill Janjati (1.05%)
11. Others (2.49%)

Chhetri people are the largest community, and dominate in the hills. Other castes including Bahun, Kami and Thakuri also live here. In the plains, Tharu people are the indigenous people although nowadays the two plains districts have a majority of Pahari people.

=== Languages ===
Languages of Sudurpashchim Province (2021)
1. Nepali (42.4%)
2. Doteli (18.1%)
3. Tharu (14.8%)
4. Baitadeli (5.62%)
5. Achhami (5.14%)
6. Bajhangi (3.69%)
7. Rana Tharu (2.88%)
8. Bajureli (2.09%)
9. Darchuleli (1.69%)
10. Others (3.58%)

The vast majority of the population speaks language varieties closely related to Nepali, if not mutually intelligible. Eastern dialects such as Bajauri and Achhami are closer to the Khas Bhasha spoken in Karnali province. The main dialect in the province is Doteli, spoken in the central part of the province, which gradually gets closer to Kumaoni spoken on the Indian side of the border. Nearly the entire Terai population spoke Tharu until the 1950s, when many Doteli and Nepali speakers from the hills migrated to the Terai. The local Tharu variant has influence from Nepali and the Hindi dialects (mainly Khadi Boli and Awadhi) spoken in the plains to the south across the border. The largest Sino-Tibetan language is Magar, although there are still some speakers of Byangsi in the higher mountain regions near Tibet.

The Language Commission of Nepal has recommended Dotyali and Tharu as official language in the province. The commission has also recommended Baitadeli, Achhami, and Bajhangi to be additional official languages, for specific regions and purposes in the province.

=== Religion ===
Religion in Sudurpashchim Province (2021)
1. Hindu (97.4%)
2. Christianity (1.39%)
3. Buddhism (0.84%)
4. Other or not stated (0.34%)

Largest cities or towns in Sudurpashchim Province Central Bureau of Statistics
Rank		District	Pop.	Rank		District	Pop.
1	Dhangadhi	Kailali	147,741	11	Bhajani	Kailali	51,845
2	Mahendranagar	Kanchanpur	104,599	12	Bedkot	Kanchanpur	49,479
3	Godawari	Kailali	78,018	13	Shuklaphanta	Kanchanpur	46,834
4	Tikapur	Kailali	76,984	14	Mahakali	Kanchanpur	39,253
5	Ghodaghodi	Kailali	75,586	15	Purchaudi	Baitadi	39,174
6	Lamki Chuha	Kailali	75,425	16	Parshuram	Dadeldhura	34,983
7	Krishnapur	Kanchanpur	56,643	17	Dasharath Chand	Baitadi	34,575
8	Gauriganga	Kailali	55,314	18	Sanphebagar	Achham	33,788
9	Punarbas	Kanchanpur	53,633	19	Bungal	Bajhang	33,224
10	Belauri	Kanchanpur	53,544	20	Dipayal Silgadhi	Doti	32,941

== See also ==
- Far-Western Development Region, Nepal
- List of districts in Nepal
- Provinces of Nepal
