= Gurans Himal =

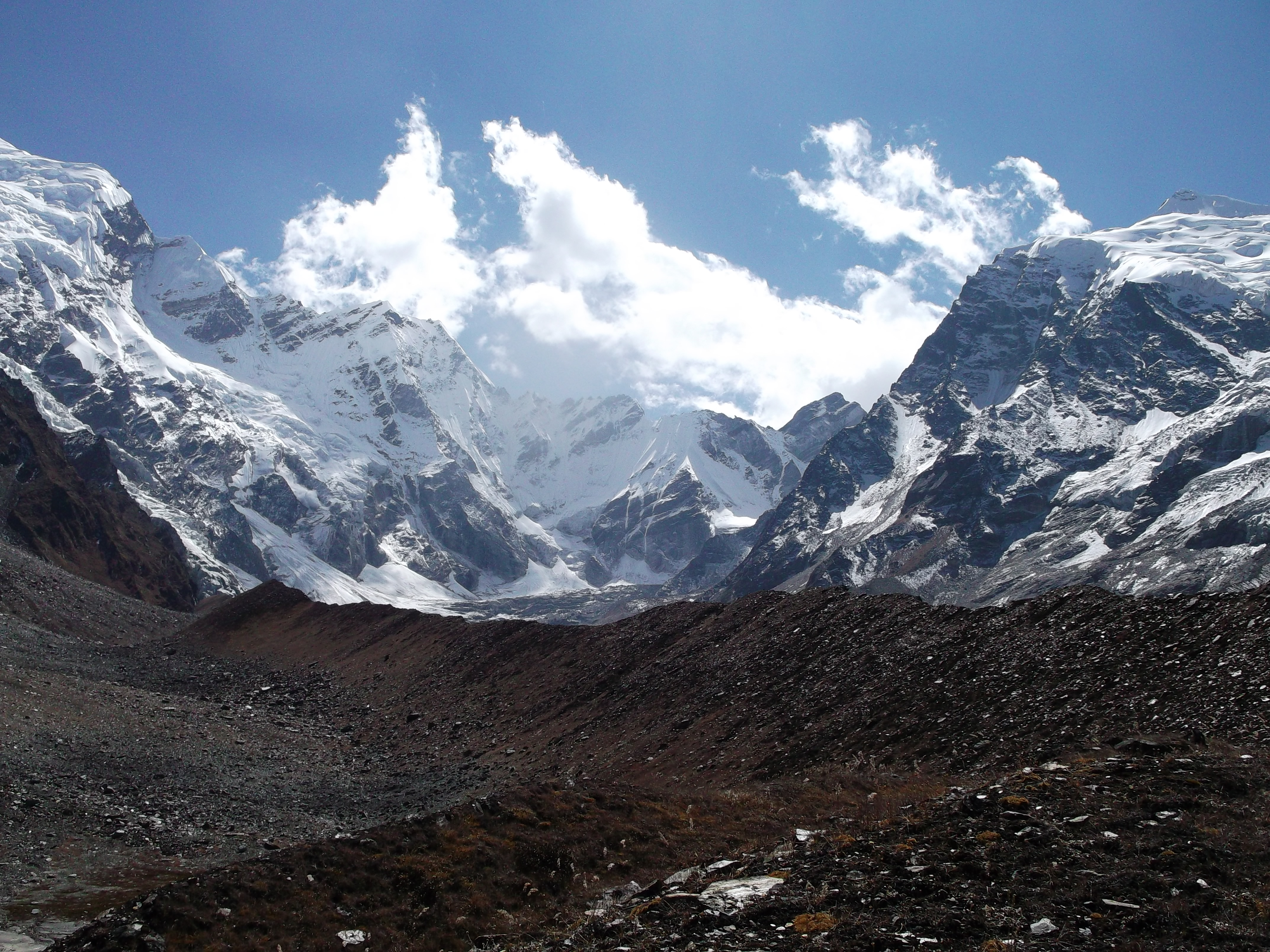
- Southern/western aspects of Api

Highest point
- Peak: Api
- Elevation: 7,132 m (23,399 ft)
- Coordinates: 30°00′15″N 80°56′00″E

Geography
- Location within Nepal
- Country: Nepal
- Parent range: Himalayas

The Gurans Himal is a small subrange of the Himalayas in far western Nepal. It is little-known, since it does not contain any 8000 metre peaks, or even any peaks above 7,200 metres. Its highest peak is Api, 7,132 m (23,399 ft), which, despite its relatively low height compared to the major Himalayan peaks, rises dramatically from a low base, as do the other significant peaks of the Gurans Himal.

Carter's classification of the Himalayas divides the Gurans Himal into two subsections. The Saipal Subsection lies east of the Seti River, and its highest peak is Api, 7,132 m (23,399 ft). The Yoka Pahar Subsection lies west of the Seti, and contains Api, 7,132 m (23,399 ft); Jethi Bahurani, 6,850 m (22,474 ft); Bobaye, 6,808 m (22,336 ft); and Nampa, 6,755 m (22,162 ft), among other peaks.
