= Jethi =

Surname list

Jethi is the surname of the following people

== Surname ==
- Deepak Jethi, Indian actor
- Karun Jethi (born in 1983), Canadian cricketer
- Vijay Jethi (born in 1994), Indian cricketer
- Navdeep Jethi (born in 1989), Book Author [ Voyage to Himavat and Necklace of Weapons]

== Given name ==
- Jethi Sipahimalani (1906-1978), Sindhi politician

== Place ==
- Jethi Bahurani, Himalayan mountain in Nepal
