= Koilabas =

Koilābās
- Village Development Committee
- Location in Nepal
- Coordinates: 27°41′50″N 82°31′34″E
- Country: Nepal
- Province: Lumbini Province
- District: Dang Deokhuri District

Population (2001)
  - Total: 1,561
- 322 households
- Time zone: UTC+5:45 (Nepal Time)

Koilabas is a bazaar town situated in Gadhawa Rural Municipality in Dang Deokhuri District in Lumbini Province of south-western Nepal. The town is situated on the southern edge of the Dudhwa Range of the Siwaliks, at Nepal's border with Uttar Pradesh 5 km from the village Jarwa on the other side. Indian and Nepalese nationals may cross the border unrestricted however there is a customs checkpoint for goods. Koilabas has regular bus service to Tulsipur on the Gorakhpur-Gonda Loop of Indian Railways.

From Koilabas, goods are transshipped over the Dudhwas to Dang and Deukhuri Valleys, then on into hill districts Pyuthan, Rolpa and Salyan. Before Nepal's east–west Mahendra Highway was built in the 1990s, Koilabas was also a transit hub. It was often easier if less direct to use Indian trains to travel east or west to reach other parts of Nepal than to traverse a seemingly endless series of north–south mountain valleys on foot.

Hindi or Awadhi are spoken natively by most inhabitants, with Nepali and Tharu widely understood.
