= Geography of Nepal =

Geography of Nepal (नेपाल)
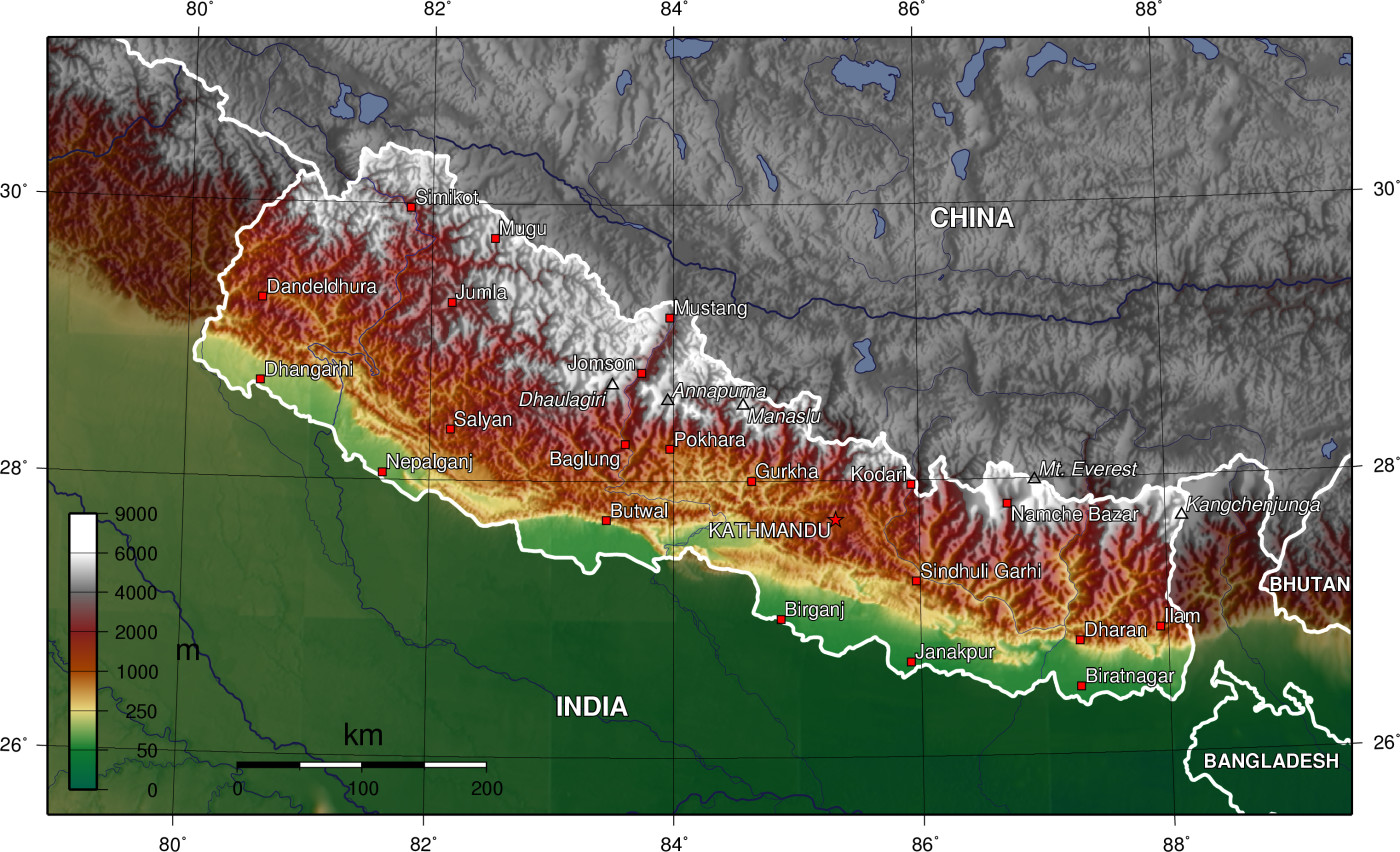
- Continent: Asia
- Region: Southern Asia coordinates = 28°00′N 84°00′E
- Area: Ranked 93rd
  - Total: 147,516 km^{2} (56,956 sq mi)
  - Land: 92.94%
  - Water: 7.06%
- Coastline: 0 km (0 mi)
- Borders: Total land borders: 2,926 km (1,818 mi); China (PRC): 1,236 km (768 mi); India: 1,690 km (1,050 mi)
- Highest point: Mount Everest; 8,848 m (29,029 ft)
- Lowest point: Mukhiyapatti Musharniya; 59 m (194 ft)
- Longest river: Karnali
- Largest lake: Rara Lake

Nepal measures about 880 kilometres (547 mi) along its Himalayan axis by 150 to 250 kilometres (93 to 155 mi) across. It has an area of 147,516 km^{2} (56,956 mi^{2}).

Nepal is landlocked by China's Tibet Autonomous Region to the north and India on the other three sides. West Bengal's narrow Siliguri Corridor separates Nepal from Bangladesh. To the east are Bhutan and India.

Nepal has a very high degree of geographic diversity and can be divided into three main regions: Terai, Hilly, and Himal. The Terai region, covering 17% of Nepal's area, is a lowland region with some hill ranges and is culturally more similar to parts of India. The Hilly region, encompassing 68% of the country's area, consists of mountainous terrain without snow and is inhabited by various indigenous ethnic groups. The Himal region, covering 15% of Nepal's area, contains snow and is home to several high mountain ranges, including Mount Everest, the world's highest peak. Nepal, with elevations ranging from less than 100 metres to over 8,000 metres, has eight climate zones from tropical to perpetual snow. The majority of the country's population resides in the tropical and subtropical climate zones. The tropical zone, below 1,000 metres, experiences frost less than once per decade and is suitable for growing various fruits and crops. The subtropical climate zone, from 1,000 to 2,000 metres, is the most prevalent and suitable for growing rice, maize, millet, wheat, and other crops. The temperate climate zone, from 2,000 to 3,000 metres, occupies 12% of Nepal's land area and is suitable for cold-tolerant crops. The subalpine, alpine, and nival zones have progressively fewer human settlements and agricultural activities.

Seasons are divided into a wet season from June to September and a dry season from October to June. The summer monsoon can cause flooding and landslides, while the winter monsoon is marked by occasional rainfall and snowfall. The diverse elevation results in various biomes, including tropical savannahs, subtropical and temperate forests, montane grasslands, and shrublands.

Nepal has three categories of rivers: the largest systems (Koshi, Gandaki/Narayani, Karnali/Goghra, and Mahakali), second category rivers (rising in the Middle Hills and Lower Himalayan Range), and third category rivers (rising in the outermost Siwalik foothills and mostly seasonal). These rivers can cause serious floods and pose challenges to transportation and communication networks. River management involves addressing flooding, sedimentation, and sustainable water sources for irrigation. Building dams in Nepal is controversial due to seismic activity, glacial lake formation, sedimentation rates, and cross-border equity issues between India and Nepal.

Nepal's land cover is dominated by forests, which cover 39.09% of the country's total geographical area, followed by agriculture areas at 29.83%. The hill region constitutes the largest portion of Nepal, with significant cultivated lands and natural vegetation. Forests in Nepal face deforestation due to over-harvesting of firewood, illegal logging, clearing for agriculture, and infrastructure expansion. As of 2010, 64.8% of the forested area in Nepal is covered by core forests of more than 500 ha in size. Deforestation and degradation are driven by multiple processes, including firewood harvesting, construction, urban expansion, and illegal logging.

Nepal has consistently been ranked as one of the most polluted countries in the world.

== Landform regions ==
For a country of its size, Nepal has tremendous geographic diversity. It rises from as low as 59 metres (194 ft) elevation in the tropical Terai—the northern rim of the Gangetic Plain, through beyond the perpetual snow line to 90 peaks over 7,000 metres (22,966 ft) including Earth's highest (8,848-metre (29,029 ft) Mount Everest or Sagarmatha). In addition to the continuum from tropical warmth to cold comparable to polar regions, average annual precipitation varies from as little as 160 millimetres (6.3 in) in its narrow proportion of the rainshadow north of the Himalayas to as much as 5,500 millimetres (216.5 in) on windward slopes, the maximum mainly resting on the magnitude of the South Asian monsoon.

Forming south-to-north transects, Nepal can be divided into three belts: Terai, Pahad and Himal. In the other direction, it is divided into three major river systems, east to west: Koshi, Gandaki/Narayani and Karnali (including the Mahakali along the western border), all tributaries of the Ganges river. The Ganges-Yarlung Zangbo/Brahmaputra watershed largely coincides with the Nepal-Tibet border, save for certain tributaries rising beyond it.

=== Himal ===
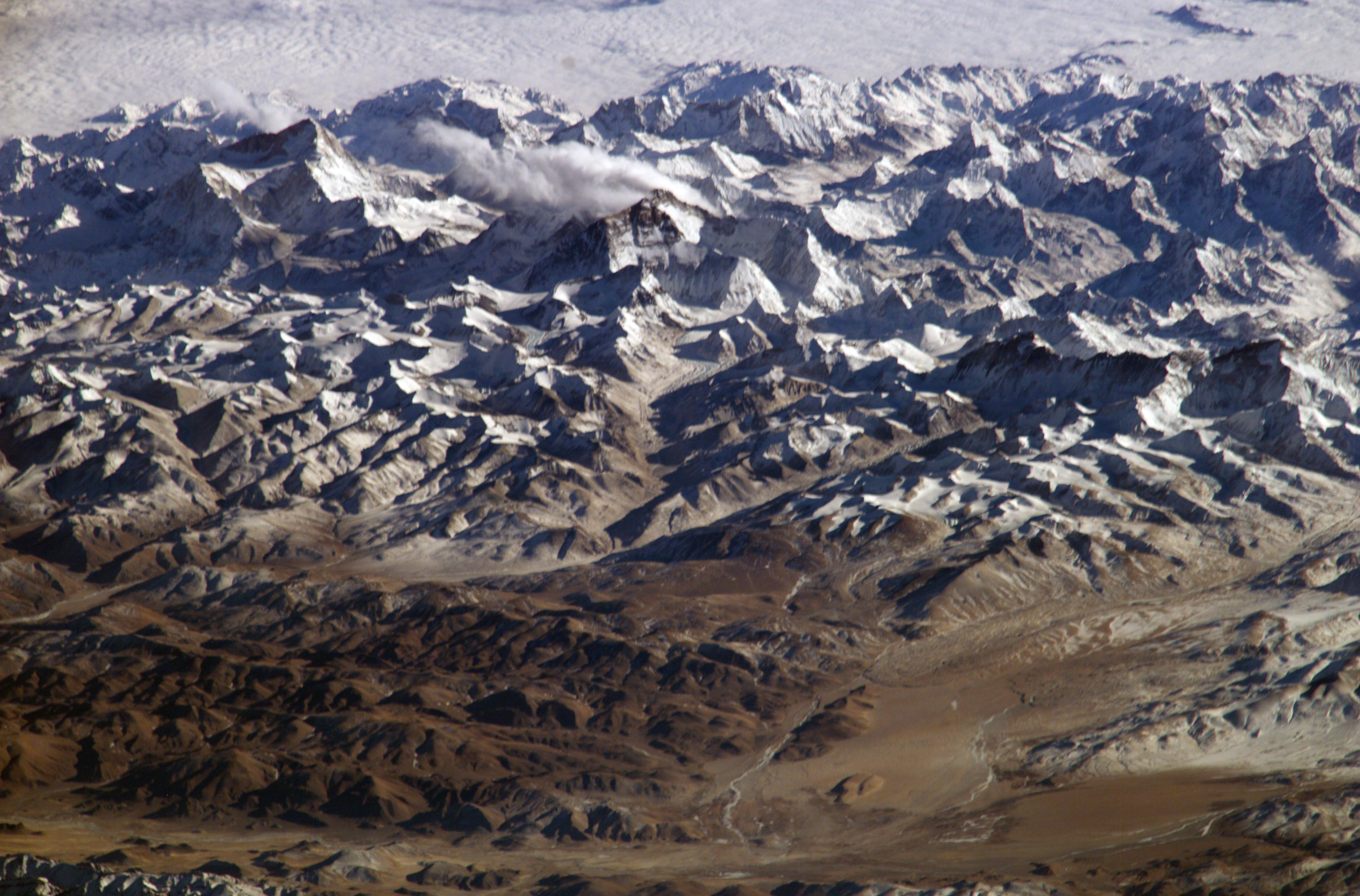
Perspective view of the Himalayas and Mount Everest as seen from space looking south-south-east from over the Tibetan Plateau. (annotated version)

Himal Region is a mountainous region containing snow. The Mountain Region begins where high ridges (Nepali: लेक; lekh) begin substantially rising above 3,000 metres (10,000 ft) into the subalpine and alpine zone which are mainly used for seasonal pasturage. By geographical view, it covers 15% of the total area of Nepal. A few tens kilometres further north the high Himalaya abruptly rise along the Main Central Thrust fault zone above the snow line at 5,000 to 5,500 metres (16,400 to 18,000 ft). Some 90 of Nepal's peaks exceed 7,000 metres (23,000 ft) and eight exceed 8,000 metres (26,247 ft) including Mount Everest at 8,848 metres (29,029 ft) and Kanchenjunga at 8,598 metres (28,209 ft).

There are some 20 subranges including the Kanchenjunga massif along with the Mahalangur Himal around Mount Everest. Langtang north of Kathmandu, Annapurna and Manaslu north of Pokhara, then Dhaulagiri further west with Kanjiroba north of Jumla and finally Gurans Himal in the far west.

Nepal’s highest mountains
Mountain	Height		Section	Location
Mount Everest (Highest in the world)	8,848 m	29,029 ft	Khumbu Mahalangur	Khumbu Pasanglhamu, Solukhumbu District, Province No. 1 (Nepal-China Border)
Kangchenjunga (3rd highest in the world)	8,586 m	28,169 ft	Northern Kanchenjunga	Phaktanglung / Sirijangha, Taplejung District, Province No. 1 (Nepal-India Border)
Lhotse (4th highest in the world)	8,516 m	27,940 ft	Everest Group	Khumbu Pasanglhamu, Solukhumbu District, Province No. 1 (Nepal-China Border)
Makalu (5th highest in the world)	8,462 m	27,762 ft	Makalu Mahalangur	Makalu, Sankhuwasabha District, Province No. 1 (Nepal-China Border)
Cho Oyu (6th highest in the world)	8,201 m	26,906 ft	Khumbu Mahalangur	Khumbu Pasanglhamu, Solukhumbu District, Province No. 1 (Nepal-China Border)
Dhaulagiri (7th highest in the world)	8,167 m	26,795 ft	Dhaulagiri	Dhaulagiri, Myagdi District, Gandaki Province
Manaslu (8th highest in the world)	8,163 m	26,759 ft	Mansiri Himal	Tsum Nubri, Gorkha District / Nashong, Manang District, Gandaki Province
Annapurna (10th highest in the world)	8,091 m	26,545 ft	Annapurna Massif	Annapurna, Kaski District / Annapurna, Myagdi District, Gandaki Province

==== Trans-Himalayan ====
The main watershed between the Brahmaputra (called Yarlung Tsangpo in Tibet) and the Ganges system (including all of Nepal) actually lies north of the highest ranges. Alpine, often semi-arid valleys—including Humla, Jumla, Dolpo, Mustang, Manang and Khumbu—cut between Himalayan sub ranges or lie north of them.

Some of these valleys historically were more accessible from Tibet than Nepal and are populated by people with Tibetan affinities called Bhotiya or Bhutia including the Sherpas in Kumbu valley near Mount Everest. With Chinese cultural hegemony in Tibet itself, these valleys have become repositories of traditional ways. Valleys with better access from the hill regions to the south are culturally linked to Nepal as well as Tibet, notably the Kali Gandaki Gorge where Thakali culture shows influences in both directions.

Permanent villages in the mountain region stand as high as 4,500 metres (15,000 ft) with summer encampments even higher. Bhotiyas graze yaks, grow cold-tolerant crops such as potatoes, barley, buckwheat and millet. They traditionally traded across the mountains, including Tibetan salt for rice from lowlands in Nepal and India. Since trade was restricted in the 1950s they have found work as high altitude porters, guides, cooks and other accessories to tourism and alpinism.

=== Hilly ===
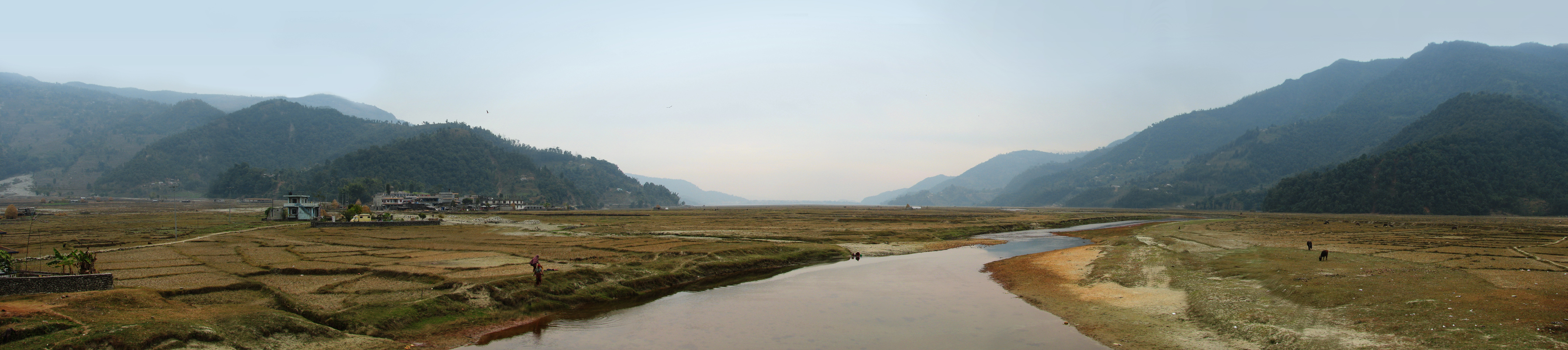
Middle Hills

Hilly Region is a mountain region which does not generally contain snow. It is situated to the south of the Himal Region (the snowy mountain region). This region begins at the Lower Himalayan Range, where a fault system called the Main Boundary Thrust creates an escarpment 1,000 to 1,500 metres (3,000 to 5,000 ft) high, to a crest between 1,500 and 2,700 metres (5,000 and 9,000 ft). It covers 68% of the total area of Nepal.

These steep southern slopes are nearly uninhabited, thus an effective buffer between languages and culture in the Terai and Hilly. Paharis mainly populate river and stream bottoms that enable rice cultivation and are warm enough for winter/spring crops of wheat and potato. The increasingly urbanised Kathmandu and Pokhara valleys fall within the Hill region. Newars are an indigenous ethnic group with their own Tibeto-Burman language. The Newar were originally indigenous to the Kathmandu valley but have spread into Pokhara and other towns alongside urbanised Pahari.

Other indigenous Janajati ethnic groups -— natively speaking highly localised Tibeto-Burman languages and dialects -— populate hillsides up to about 2,500 metres (8,000 ft). This group includes Magar and Kham Magar west of Pokhara, Gurung south of the Annapurnas, Tamang around the periphery of Kathmandu Valley and Rai, Koinch Sunuwar and Limbu further east. Temperate and subtropical fruits are grown as cash crops. Marijuana was grown and processed into Charas (hashish) until international pressure persuaded the government to outlaw it in 1976. There is increasing reliance on animal husbandry with elevation, using land above 2,000 metres (7,000 ft) for summer grazing and moving herds to lower elevations in winter. Grain production has not kept pace with population growth at elevations above 1,000 metres (3,300 ft) where colder temperatures inhibit double cropping. Food deficits drive emigration out of the Pahad in search of employment.

The Hilly ends where ridges begin substantially rising out of the temperate climate zone into subalpine zone above 3,000 metres (10,000 ft).

=== Terai ===
Terai is a low land region containing some hill ranges. Looking out for its coverage, it covers 17% of the total area of Nepal. The Terai (also spelt Tarai) region begins at the Indian border and includes the southernmost part of the flat, intensively farmed Gangetic Plain called the Outer Terai. By the 19th century, timber and other resources were being exported to India. Industrialisation based on agricultural products such as jute began in the 1930s and infrastructure such as roadways, railways and electricity were extended across the border before it reached Nepal's Pahad region.

The Outer Terai is culturally more similar to adjacent parts of India's Bihar and Uttar Pradesh than to the Pahad of Nepal. Nepali is taught in schools and often spoken in government offices, however, the local population mostly uses Maithali, Bhojpuri and Tharu languages.

The Outer Terai ends at the base of the first range of foothills called the Chure Hills or Churia. This range has a densely forested skirt of coarse alluvium called the Bhabar. Below the Bhabhar, finer, less permeable sediments force groundwater to the surface in a zone of springs and marshes. In Persian, terai refers to wet or marshy ground. Before the use of DDT this was dangerously malarial. Nepal's rulers used this for a defensive frontier called the char kose jhadi (four kos forest, one kos equaling about three kilometres or two miles).

Above the Bhabar belt, the Chure Hills rise to about 700 metres (2,297 ft) with peaks as high as 1,000 metres (3,281 ft), steeper on their southern flanks because of faults are known as the Main Frontal Thrust. This range is composed of poorly consolidated, coarse sediments that do not retain water or support soil development so there is virtually no agricultural potential and sparse population.

In several places beyond the Chure, there are dūn valleys called Inner Terai. These valleys have productive soil but were dangerously malarial except to indigenous Tharu people who had genetic resistance. In the mid-1950s DDT came into use to suppress mosquitos and the way was open to settlement from the land-poor hills, to the detriment of the Tharu.

The Terai ends and the Pahad begin at a higher range of foothills called the Lower Himalayan Range.

== Climate ==
Nepal map of Köppen climate classification zones

=== Altitudinal belts ===
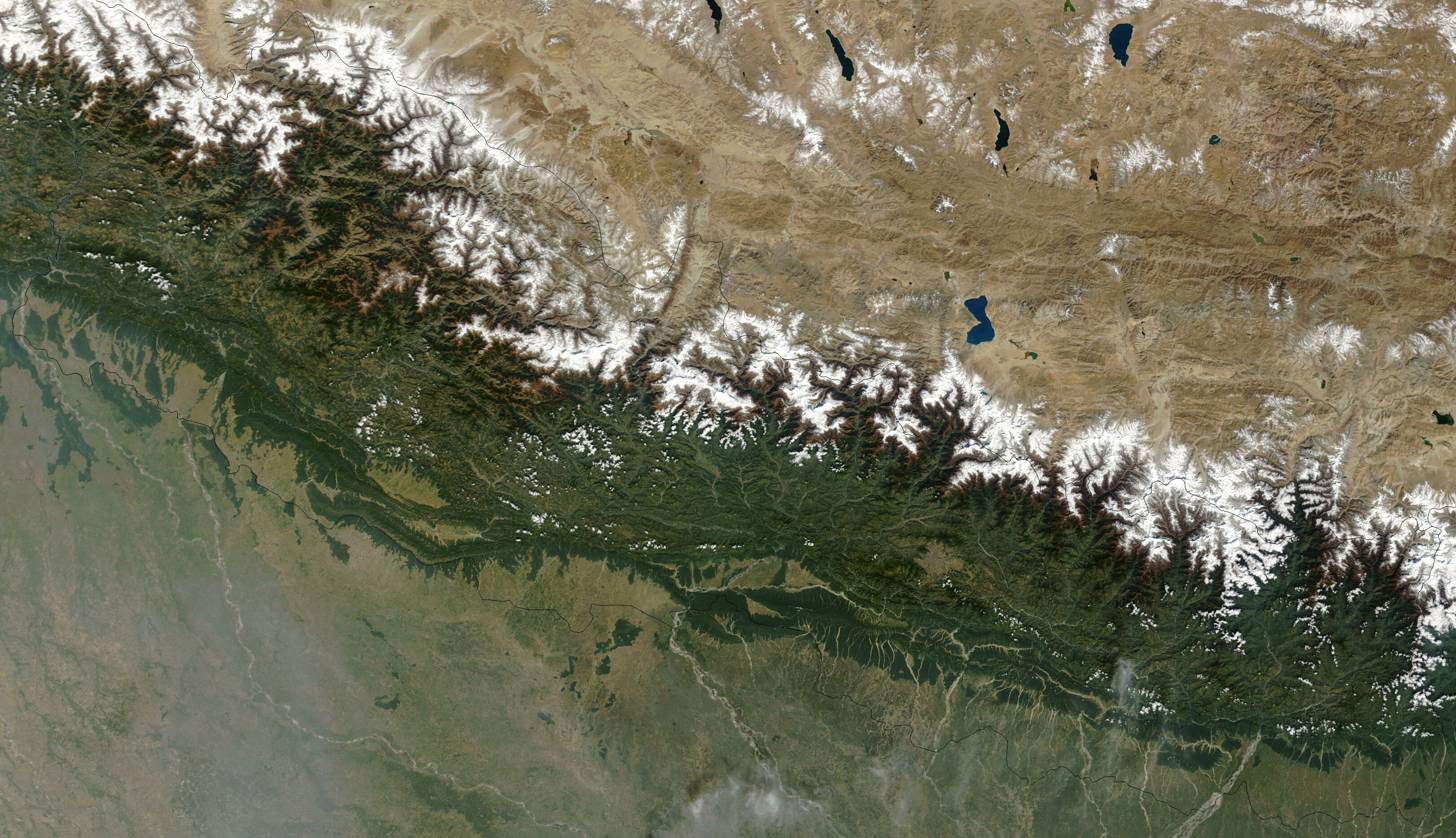
Satellite image of Nepal in October 2002

Nepal's latitude is about the same as that of the United States state of Florida, however with elevations ranging from less than 100 metres (300 ft) to over 8,000 metres (26,000 ft) and precipitation from 160 millimetres (6 in) to over 5,000 millimetres (16 ft) the country has eight climate zones from tropical to perpetual snow.

The tropical zone below 1,000 metres (3,300 ft) experiences frost less than once per decade. It can be subdivided into lower tropical (below 300 metres or 1,000 ft.) with 18% of the nation's land area) and upper (18% of land area) tropical zones. The best mangoes and well as papaya and banana are largely confined to the lower zone. Other fruit such as litchee, jackfruit, citrus and mangoes of lower quality grow in the upper tropical zone as well. Winter crops include grains and vegetables typically grown in temperate climates. The Outer Terai is virtually all in the lower tropical zone. Inner Terai valleys span both tropical zones. The Sivalik Hills are mostly upper tropical. Tropical climate zones extend far upriver valleys across the Middle Hills and even into the Mountain regions.

The subtropical climate zone from 1,000 to 2,000 metres (3,300 to 6,600 ft) occupies 22% of Nepal's land area and is the most prevalent climate of the Middle Hills above river valleys. It experiences frost up to 53 days per year, however, this varies greatly with elevation, proximity to high mountains and terrain either draining or ponding cold air drainage. Crops include rice, maize, millet, wheat, potato, stone fruits and citrus.

The great majority of Nepal's population occupies the tropical and subtropical climate zones. In the Middle Hills, "upper-caste" Hindus are concentrated in tropical valleys which are well suited for rice cultivation while Janajati ethnic groups mostly live above in the subtropical zone and grow other grains more than rice.

The Temperate climate zone from 2,000 to 3,000 metres (6,600 to 9,800 ft) occupies 12% of Nepal's land area and has up to 153 annual days of frost. It is encountered in higher parts of the Middle Hills and throughout much of the Mountain region. Crops include cold-tolerant rice, maize, wheat, barley, potato, apple, walnut, peach, various cole, amaranthus and buckwheat.

The Subalpine zone from 3,000 to 4,000 metres (9,800 to 13,100 ft) occupies 9% of Nepal's land area, mainly in the Mountain and Himalayan regions. It has permanent settlements in the Himalaya, but further south it is only seasonally occupied as pasture for sheep, goats, yak and hybrids in warmer months. There are up to 229 annual days of frost here. Crops include barley, potato, cabbage, cauliflower, amaranthus, buckwheat and apple. Medicinal plants are also gathered.

The Alpine zone from 4,000 to 5,000 metres (13,100 to 16,400 ft) occupies 8% of the country's land area. There are a few permanent settlements above 4,000 metres. There is virtually no plant cultivation although medicinal herbs are gathered. Sheep, goats, yaks and hybrids are pastured in warmer months.

Above 5,000 metres the climate becomes Nival and there is no human habitation or even seasonal use.

Arid and semi-arid land in the rainshadow of high ranges have a Transhimalayan climate. Population density is very low. Cultivation and husbandry conform to subalpine and alpine patterns but depend on snowmelt and streams for irrigation.

Precipitation generally decreases from east to west with increasing distance from the Bay of Bengal, source of the summer monsoon. Eastern Nepal gets about 2,500 mm (100 in) annually; the Kathmandu area about 1,400 mm (55 in) and western Nepal about 1,000 mm (40 in). This pattern is modified by adiabatic effects as rising air masses cool and drop their moisture content on windward slopes, then warm up as they descend so relative humidity drops. Annual precipitation reaches 5,500 mm (18 ft) on windward slopes in the Annapurna Himalaya beyond a relatively low stretch of the Lower Himalayan Range. In rainshadows beyond the high mountains, annual precipitation drops as low as 160 mm (6 in).

=== Seasons ===
The year is divided into a wet season from June to September—as summer warmth over Inner Asia creates a low-pressure zone that draws in moist air from the Indian Ocean—and a dry season from October to June as cold temperatures in the vast interior create a high-pressure zone causing dry air to flow outward. April and May are months of intense water stress when cumulative effects of the long dry season are exacerbated by temperatures rising over 40 °C (104 °F) in the tropical climate belt. Seasonal drought further intensifies in the Siwaliks hills consisting of poorly consolidated, coarse, permeable sediments that do not retain water, so hillsides are often covered with drought-tolerant scrub forest. In fact, much of Nepal's native vegetation adapted to withstand drought, but less so at higher elevations where cooler temperatures mean less water stress.

The summer monsoon may be preceded by a buildup of thunderstorm activity that provides water for rice seedbeds. Sustained rain on average arrives in mid-June as rising temperatures over Inner Asia creates a low-pressure zone that draws in moist air from the Indian Ocean, but this can vary up to a month. Significant failure of monsoon rains historically meant drought and famine while above-normal rains still cause flooding and landslides with losses in human lives, farmland and buildings.

The monsoon also complicates transportation with roads and trails washing out while unpaved roads and airstrips may become unusable and cloud cover reduces safety margins for aviation. Rains diminish in September and generally end by mid-October, ushering in generally cool, clear, and dry weather, as well as the most relaxed and jovial period in Nepal. By this time, the harvest is completed and people are in a festive mood. The two largest and most important Hindu festivals—Dashain and Tihar (Dipawali)—arrive during this period, about one month apart. The post-monsoon season lasts until about December.

After the post-monsoon comes the winter monsoon, a strong northeasterly flow marked by occasional, short rainfalls in the lowlands and plains and snowfalls in the high-altitude areas. In this season the Himalayas function as a barrier to cold air masses from Inner Asia, so southern Nepal and northern India have warmer winters than would otherwise be the case. April and May are dry and hot, especially below 1,200 metres (4,000 ft) where afternoon temperatures may exceed 40 °C (104 °F).

== Environment ==
The dramatic changes in elevation along this transect result in a variety of biomes, from tropical savannahs along the Indian border, to subtropical broadleaf and coniferous forests in the hills, to temperate broadleaf and coniferous forests on the slopes of the Himalaya, to montane grasslands and shrublands, and finally rock and ice at the highest elevations.

This corresponds to the Terai-Duar savannah and grasslands ecoregion.

Subtropical forests dominate the lower elevations of the Hill region. They form a mosaic running east–west across Nepal, with Himalayan subtropical broadleaf forests between 500 and 1,000 metres (1,600 and 3,300 ft) and Himalayan subtropical pine forests between 1,000 and 2,000 metres (3,300 and 6,600 ft). At higher elevations, to 3,000 metres (10,000 ft), are found temperate broadleaf forests: eastern Himalayan broadleaf forests to the east of the Gandaki River and western Himalayan broadleaf forests to the west.

The native forests of the Mountain region change from east to west as precipitation decreases. They can be broadly classified by their relation to the Gandaki River. From 3,000 to 4,000 metres (10,000 to 13,000 ft) are the eastern and western Himalayan subalpine conifer forests. To 5,500 metres (18,000 ft) are the eastern and western Himalayan alpine shrub and meadows.

=== Environmental issues ===
Natural hazards
Earthquakes, severe thunderstorms (tornadoes are rare), flooding and flash flooding, landslides, drought, and famine depending on the timing, intensity, and duration of the summer monsoons
Environment - current issues
Deforestation (overuse of wood for fuel and lack of alternatives); contaminated water (with human and animal wastes, agricultural runoff, and industrial effluents); wildlife conservation; vehicular emissions
Environment - international agreements
- Party to: Biodiversity, Climate Change, Climate Change-Kyoto Protocol, Desertification, Endangered Species, Hazardous Wastes, Law of the Sea, Ozone Layer Protection, Tropical Timber 83, Tropical Timber 94, Wetlands
- Signed, but not ratified: Marine Life Conservation
- Existing and proposed dams, barrages and canals for flood control, irrigation and hydroelectric generation

== River systems ==
Nepal has three categories of rivers. The largest systems -— from east to west the Koshi, Gandaki/Narayani, Karnali/Goghra and Mahakali—originate in multiple tributaries rising in or beyond the high Himalaya that maintain substantial flows from snowmelt through the hot, drought-stricken spring before the summer monsoon. These tributaries cross the highest mountains in deep gorges, flow south through the Middle Hills, then join in candelabra-like configuration before crossing the Lower Himalayan Range and emerging onto the plains where they have deposited megafans exceeding 10,000 km^{2} (4,000 mi^{2}) in area.

The Koshi is also called Sapta Koshi for its seven Himalayan tributaries in eastern Nepal: Indrawati, Sun Koshi, Tama Koshi, Dudh Koshi, Liku, Arun, and Tamor. The Arun rises in Tibet some 150 kilometres (100 mi) beyond Nepal's northern border. A tributary of the Sun Koshi, Bhote Koshi also rises in Tibet and is followed by the Arniko Highway connecting Kathmandu and Lhasa.

The Gandaki/Narayani has seven Himalayan tributaries in the centre of the country: Daraundi, Seti Gandaki, Madi, Kali, Marsyandi, Budhi, and Trisuli also called Sapta Gandaki. The Kali Gandaki rises on the edge of the Tibetan Plateau and flows through the semi-independent Kingdom of Mustang, then between the 8,000 metre Dhaulagiri and Annapurna ranges in the world's deepest valley. The Trisuli rises north of the international border inside Tibet. After the seven upper tributaries join, the river becomes the Narayani inside Nepal and is joined by the East Rapti from Chitwan Valley. Crossing into India, its name changes to Gandak.

The Karnali drains western Nepal, with the Bheri and Seti as major tributaries. The upper Bheri drains Dolpo, a remote valley beyond the Dhaulagiri Himalaya with traditional Tibetan cultural affinities. The upper Karnali rises inside Tibet near-sacred Lake Manasarovar and Mount Kailash. The area around these features is the hydrographic nexus of South Asia since it holds the sources of the Indus and its major tributary the Sutlej, the Karnali—a Ganges tributary—and the Yarlung Tsangpo/Brahmaputra. It is the centre of the universe according to traditional cosmography. The Mahakali or Kali along the Nepal-India border on the west joins the Karnali in India, where the river is known as Goghra or Ghaghara.

Second category rivers rise in the Middle Hills and Lower Himalayan Range, from east to west the Mechi, Kankai and Kamala south of the Kosi; the Bagmati that drains Kathmandu Valley between the Kosi and Gandaki systems, then the West Rapti and the Babai between the Gandaki and Karnali systems. Without glacial sources, annual flow regimes in these rivers are more variable although limited flow persists through the dry season.

Third category rivers rise in the outermost Siwalik foothills and are mostly seasonal.

None of these river systems supports significant commercial navigation. Instead, deep gorges create obstacles to establishing transport and communication networks and de-fragmenting the economy. Foot-trails are still the primary transportation routes in many hill districts.

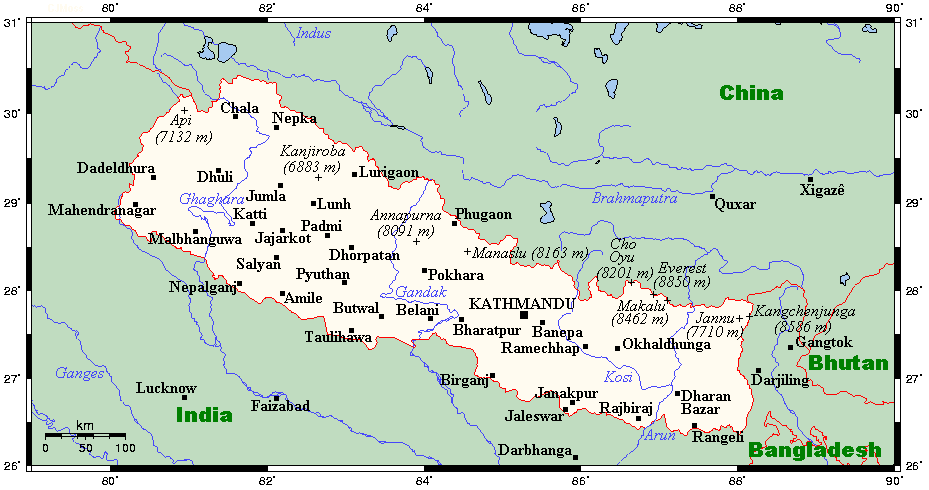
Nepal's towns, villages, rivers and peaks

=== River management ===
Rivers in all three categories are capable of causing serious floods. Koshi River in the first category caused a major flood in August 2008 in Bihar state, India after breaking through a poorly maintained embankment just inside Nepal. The West Rapti in the second category is called "Gorakhpur's Sorrow" for its history of urban flooding. Third category Terai rivers are associated with flash floods.

Since uplift and erosion are more or less in equilibrium in the Himalaya, at least where the climate is humid, rapid uplift must be balanced out by annual increments of millions tonnes of sediments washing down from the mountains; then on the plains settling out of suspension on vast alluvial fans over which rivers meander and change course at least every few decades, causing some experts to question whether manmade embankments can contain the problem of flooding. Traditional Mithila culture along the lower Koshi in Nepal and Bihar celebrated the river as the giver of life for its fertile alluvial soil, yet also the taker of life through its catastrophic floods.

Large reservoirs in the Middle Hills may be able to capture peak flows and mitigate downstream flooding, to store surplus monsoon flows for dry season irrigation and to generate electricity. Water for irrigation is especially compelling because the Indian Terai is suspected to have entered a food bubble where dry season crops are dependent on water from tube wells that in the aggregate are unsustainably "mining" groundwater.

Depletion of aquifers without building upstream dams as a sustainable alternative water source could precipitate a Malthusian catastrophe in India's food insecure states Uttar Pradesh and Bihar, with over 300 million combined population. With India already experiencing a Naxalite–Maoist insurgency in Bihar, Jharkhand and Andhra Pradesh, Nepalese reluctance to agree to water projects could even seem an existential threat to India.

As Nepal builds barrages to divert more water for irrigation during the dry season preceding the summer monsoon, there is less for downstream users in Bangladesh and India's Bihar and Uttar Pradesh states. The best solution could be building large upstream reservoirs, to capture and store surplus flows during the summer monsoon as well as providing flood control benefits to Bangladesh and India. Then water-sharing agreements could allocate a portion of the stored water to be left to flow into India during the following dry season.

Nevertheless, building dams in Nepal is controversial for several reasons. First, the region is seismically active. Dam failures caused by earthquakes could cause tremendous death and destruction downstream, particularly on the densely populated Gangetic Plain. Second, global warming has led to the formation of glacial lakes dammed by unstable moraines. Sudden failures of these moraines can cause floods with cascading failures of manmade structures downstream.

Third, sedimentation rates in the Himalaya are extremely high, leading to rapid loss of storage capacity as sediments accumulate behind dams. Fourth, there are complicated questions of cross-border equity in how India and Nepal would share costs and benefits that have proven difficult to resolve in the context of frequent acrimony between the two countries.

== Area ==
- Total: 147,516 km^{2} (56,956 sq mi)
- Land: 143,181 km^{2} (55,282 sq mi)
- Water: 4,000 km^{2} (1,544 sq mi)

Coastline
0 km (landlocked)
Elevation extremes
- Lowest point: Kechana Kawal, jhapa district 59 m
- Highest point: Sagarmatha (Mount Everest) 8,848 m

== Resources and land use ==
Natural resources
Quartz, water, timber, hydropower, scenic beauty, small deposits of lignite, copper, cobalt, iron ore
Land use
- Arable land: 16.0%
- Permanent crops: 0.8%
- Other: 83.2% (2001)
Irrigated land
11,680 km² (2003) Nearly 50% of arable land
Total renewable water resources
210.2 km^{3} (2011)

== Land cover ==
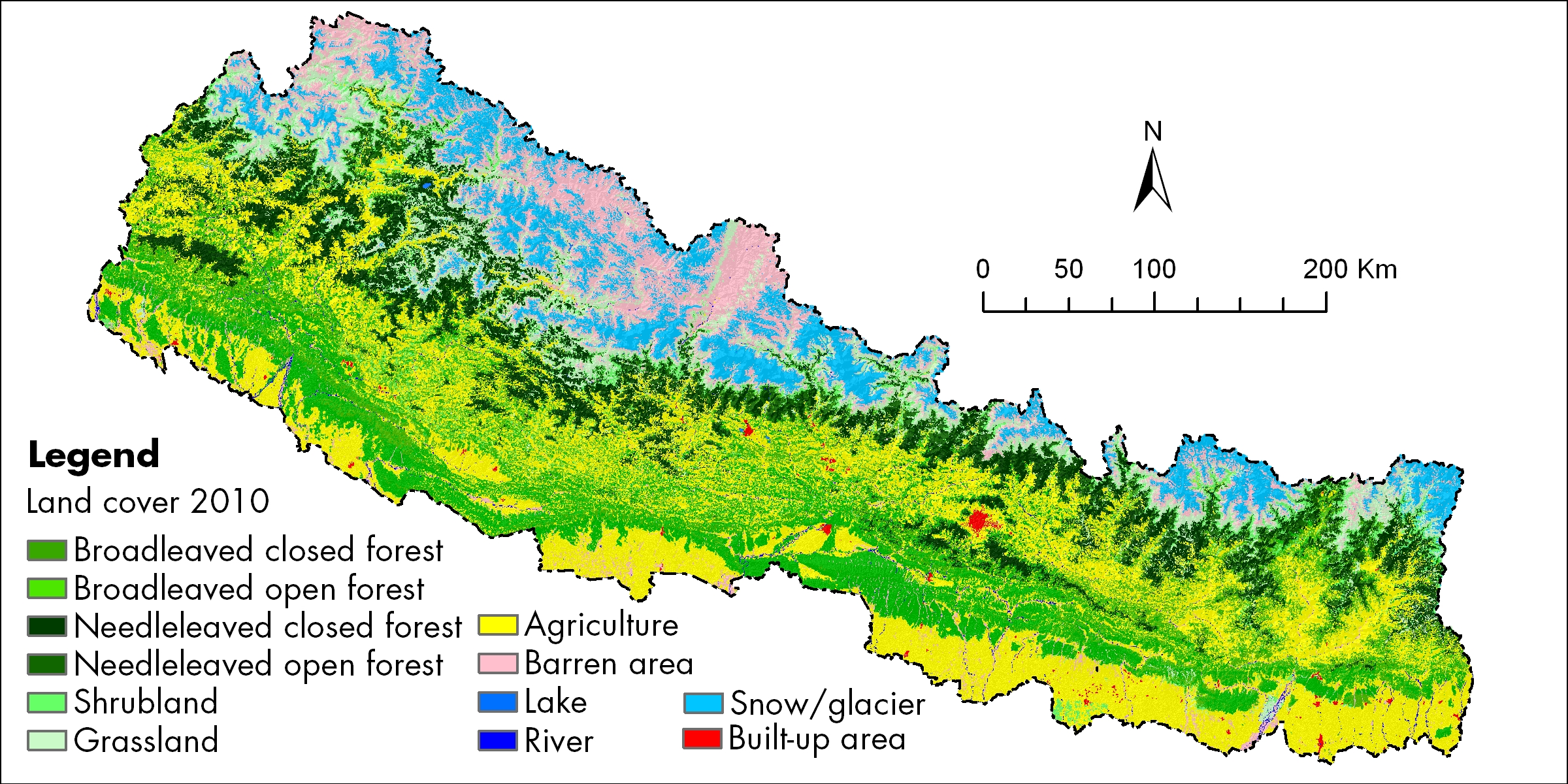
A land cover map of Nepal using Landsat 30 m (2010) data.

ICIMOD’s first and most complete national land cover database of Nepal prepared using public domain Landsat TM data of 2010 shows that show that forest is the dominant form of land cover in Nepal covering 57,538 km^{2} with a contribution of 39.09% to the total geographical area of the country. Most of this forest cover is broadleaved closed and open forest, which covers 21,200 km^{2} or 14.4% of the geographical area.

Needleleaved open forest is the least common of the forest areas covering 8267 km^{2} (5.62%). Agriculture area is significant extending over 43,910 km^{2} (29.83%). As would be expected, the high mountain area is largely covered by snow and glaciers and barren land.

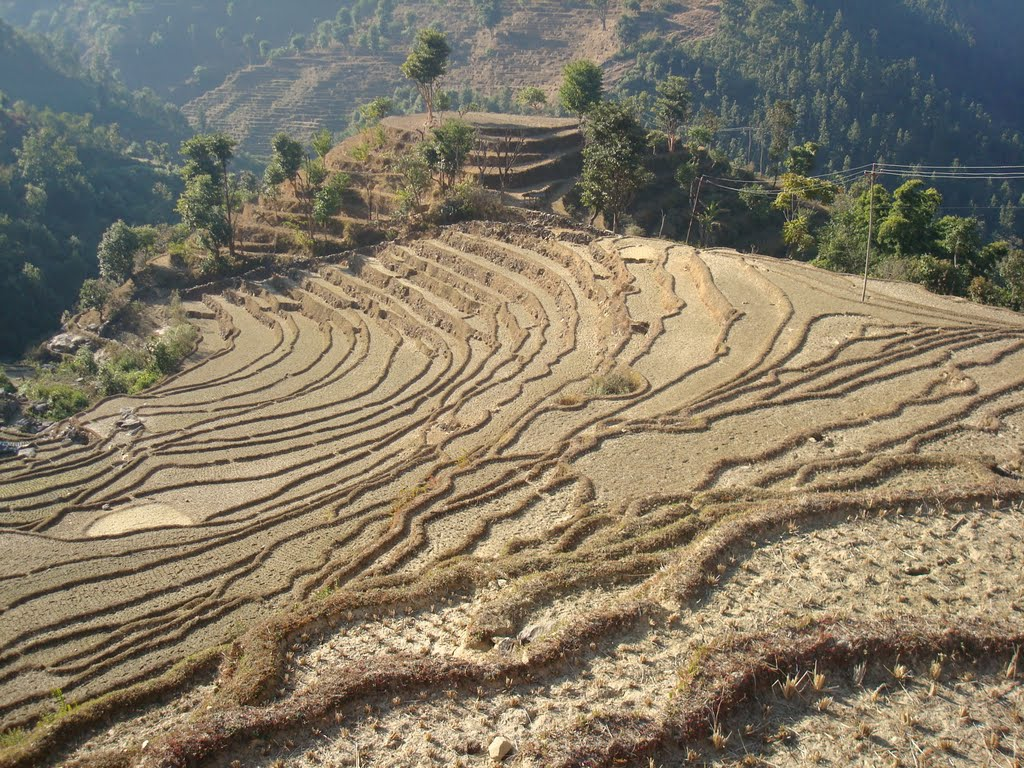
Terraced farmland in Nepal.

The Hill region constitutes the largest portion of Nepal, covering 29.5% of the geographical area, and has a large area (19,783 km^{2}) of cultivated or managed lands, natural and semi natural vegetation (22,621 km^{2}) and artificial surfaces (200 km^{2}). The Tarai region has more cultivated or managed land (14,104 km^{2}) and comparatively less natural and semi natural vegetation (4280 km^{2}). The Tarai has only 267 km^{2} of natural water bodies. The High mountain region has 12,062 km^{2} of natural water bodies, snow/glaciers and 13,105 km^{2} barren areas.

=== Forests ===
25.4% of Nepal's land area, or about 36,360 km^{2} (14,039 mi^{2}) is covered with forest according to FAO figures from 2005. FAO estimates that around 9.6% of Nepal's forest cover consists of primary forest which is relatively intact. About 12.1% Nepal's forest is classified as protected while about 21.4% is conserved according to FAO. About 5.1% Nepal's forests are classified as production forest. Between 2000 and 2005, Nepal lost about 2,640 km^{2} (1,019 mi^{2}) of forest. Nepal's 2000–2005 total deforestation rate was about 1.4% per year meaning it lost an average of 530 km^{2} (205 mi^{2}) of forest annually. Nepal's total deforestation rate from 1990 to 2000 was 920 km^{2} (355 mi^{2}) or 2.1% per year. The 2000–2005 true deforestation rate in Nepal, defined as the loss of primary forest, is −0.4% or 70 km^{2} (27 mi^{2}) per year. Forest is not changing in the plan land of Nepal, forest fragmenting on the "Roof of the World".

According to ICIMOD figures from 2010, forest is the dominant form of land cover in Nepal covering 57,538 km^{2} with a contribution of 39.09% to the total geographical area of the country. Most of this forest cover is broadleaved closed and open forest, which covers 21,200 km^{2} or 14.4% of the geographical area. Needleleaved open forest is the least common of the forest areas covering 8,267 km^{2} (5.62%). At national level 64.8% area is covered by core forests of > 500 ha size and 23.8% forests belong to patch and edge category forests. The patch forest constituted 748 km^{2} at national level, out of which 494 km^{2} of patch forests are present in hill regions. Middle mountains, Siwaliks and Terai regions have more than 70% of the forest area under core forest category > 500 ha size. The edge forests constituted around 30% of forest area of High Mountain and Hill regions. Forest Resource Assessment (FRA) which was conducted between 2010 and 2014 by the Ministry of Forest and Soil conservation with the financial and technical help of the Government of Finland shows that 40.36% of the land of Nepal is forested. 4.40% of the land has shrubs and bushes.

Deforestation is driven by multiple processes. Virtually throughout the nation, over-harvest of firewood remains problematic. Despite the availability of liquefied petroleum gas in towns and cities, firewood is sold more at energy-competitive prices because cutting and selling it is a fallback when better employment opportunities aren't forthcoming. Firewood still supplies 80% of Nepal's energy for heating and cooking. Harvesting construction timber and lopping branches for fodder for cattle and other farm animals are also deforestation/degradation drivers in all geographic zones.

Illegal logging is a problem in the Siwaliks, with sawlogs smuggled into India. Clearing for resettlement and agriculture expansion also causes deforestation as does urban expansion, building infrastructure such as schools, hospitals, electric transmission lines, water tanks, police and army barracks, temples and picnic areas.

In the Middle Hills road construction, reservoirs, transmission lines and extractive manufacturing such as cement factories cause deforestation. In the mountains building hotels, monasteries and trekking trails cause deforestation while timber-smuggling into the Tibet Autonomous Region and over-grazing cause degradation.

== Boundaries ==
- Total: 2,926 km
- Border countries: China 1,236 km, India 1,690 km

=== Border crossings with India ===
While India and Nepal have an open border with no restrictions on movement of their citizens on either side, there are 23 checkpoints for trade purposes. These are listed in clockwise order, east to west. The six in italics are also used for entry/exit by third country nationals.

Crossing Name	Crossing Location	Nepali town	District	Province	Indian town	District	State
Pashupatinagar	26°56′54″N 88°07′20″E	Pashupatinagar	Ilam	Province No. 1	Sukhiapokhri	Darjeeling	West Bengal
Mechi	26°38′41″N 88°09′43″E	Kakarbhitta	Jhapa	Province No. 1	Naxalbari (Panitanki)	Darjeeling district	West Bengal
	26°32′50″N 88°06′36″E	Bhadrapur	Jhapa district	Province No. 1	Galgalia	Kishanganj	Bihar
Biratnagar	26°24′09″N 87°15′57″E	Biratnagar	Morang	Province No. 1	Jogbani	Araria	Bihar
Sunsari	26°31′07″N 86°57′04″E		Sunsari	Province No. 1	Bhimnagar	Supaul	Bihar
Rajbiraj	26°27′00″N 86°47′34″E	Rajbiraj	Saptari	Province No. 2	Kunauli	Supaul District	Bihar
Siraha	26°36′22″N 86°08′14″E	Siraha	Siraha	Province No. 2	Jayanagar	Madhubani	Bihar
	26°39′29″N 86°04′04″E	Thadi Jhijha	Dhanusa	Province No. 2	Laukaha	Madhubani district	Bihar
Jaleshwar		Jaleswar	Mahottari	Province No. 2	Sursand	Sitamarhi	Bihar
		Malangawa	Sarlahi	Province No. 2	Sonbarsa	Sitamarhi district	Bihar
Gaur		Gaur	Rautahat	Province No. 2	Bairgania	Sitamarhi district	Bihar
Birganj		Birganj	Parsa	Province No. 2	Raxaul	East Champaran	Bihar
Parasi		Mahespur			Thutibari	Maharajganj	Uttar Pradesh
Bhairahawa		Siddharthanagar (Bhairahawa)	Rupandehi	Lumbini Province	Nautanwa	Maharajganj	Uttar Pradesh
Taulihawa-Siddharthnagar	27°27′30″N 82°59′40″E	Taulihawa	Kapilvastu	Lumbini Province	Khunwa	Siddharthanagar	Uttar Pradesh
Krishnanagar		Krishnanagar	Kapilvastu District	Lumbini Province	Barhni	Siddharthnagar district	Uttar Pradesh
Koilabas		Koilabas	Dang	Lumbini Province	Jarwa	Balrampur	Uttar Pradesh
Nepalganj		Nepalganj	Banke	Lumbini Province	Rupaidiha	Bahraich	Uttar Pradesh
Rajapur		Rajapur	Bardiya	Lumbini Province	Katerniyaghat	Bahraich district	Uttar Pradesh
		Prithivipur (Sati)	Kailali	Sudurpashchim Province	Tikonia	Lakhimpur Kheri	Uttar Pradesh
		Dhangadhi	Kailali District	Sudurpashchim Province	Gauriphanta	Lakhimpur Kheri district	Uttar Pradesh
		Bhim Datta (Mahendranagar)	Kanchanpur	Sudurpashchim Province	Banbasa	Champawat	Uttarakhand
Mahakali		Mahakali	Baitadi	Sudurpashchim Province	Jhulaghat (Pithoragarh)	Pithoragarh	Uttarakhand
		Darchula	Darchula	Sudurpashchim Province	Dharchula	Pithoragarh district	Uttarakhand

=== Border crossings with China ===
Ports of Entry According to 2012 Treaty
Crossing Name (Other Name)	Nepali Jurisdiction	Chinese Jurisdiction	Status	Crossing Location	Border elevation
Burang–Yari (Xieerwa)	Hilsa, Humla District	Burang, Burang County	Active	30°09′12″N 81°20′00″E	3,640 m (11,900 ft)
Lizi—Nechung (Kora La)	Lo Manthang, Mustang District	Zhongba County	Planned	29°19′24″N 83°59′09″E	4,620 m (15,200 ft)
Gyirong–Rasuwa	Rasuwa Gadhi, Rasuwa District	Gyirong, Gyirong County	Active	28°16′45″N 85°22′43″E	1,850 m (6,100 ft)
Zhangmu–Kodari	Tatopani, Sindhupalchok District	Zhangmu, Nyalam County	Active	27°58′24″N 85°57′50″E	1,760 m (5,800 ft)
Chentang–Kimathanka	Kimathanka, Sankhuwasabha District	Chentang, Dinggyê County	Planned	27°51′30″N 87°25′30″E	2,248 m (7,400 ft)
Ri'og–Olangchung Gola (Tipta La)	Olangchung Gola, Taplejung District	Ri'og, Dinggyê County	Planned	27°49′00″N 87°44′00″E	5,095 m (16,700 ft)

== See also ==
- Geology of Nepal
- List of mountains in Nepal
- Valleys of Nepal
