= Jarwa =

- village
- Location in Uttar Pradesh, India Jarwa (India)
- Coordinates: 27°39′N 82°31′E
- Country: India
- State: Uttar Pradesh
- District: Balrampur

Government
  - Body: Gram panchayat

Population
  - Total: 856

Languages
  - Official: Hindi
- Time zone: UTC+5:30 (IST)
- Vehicle registration: UP- 47
- Lok Sabha constituency: Shrawasti
- Vidhan Sabha constituency: Gainsari
- Website: up.gov.in

Jarwa is a village in the Uttar Pradesh province of northern India 5 kilometres south of the border with Nepal at Koilabas. Nepalese and Indian nationals may cross the border unrestricted, however there is a customs checkpoint for goods. Tulsipur is the nearest town inside India.
