= Bobaye =

Mountain in Nepal

Highest point
- Elevation: 6,808 m (22,336 ft)
- Listing: Mountains of Nepal
- Coordinates: 29°57′30″N 81°01′21″E

Naming
- Native name: बोबये चुली (Nepali)

Geography
- Country: Nepal
- Province: Sudurpashchim
- Districts: Darchula and Bajhang
- Parent range: Byas Rishi Himal

Climbing
- First ascent: 2 November 1996

Bobaye (Nepali: बोबये चुली) is a mountain in Sudurpashchim Province, Nepal. Bobaye has a summit elevation of 6,808 metres (22,336 ft) and it is part of the Byas Rishi Himal.

It was first climbed on 2 November 1996 by Tomaz Humar.
