= Seti River =

River in Nepal

Coordinates: 28.9661°N 81.1043°E

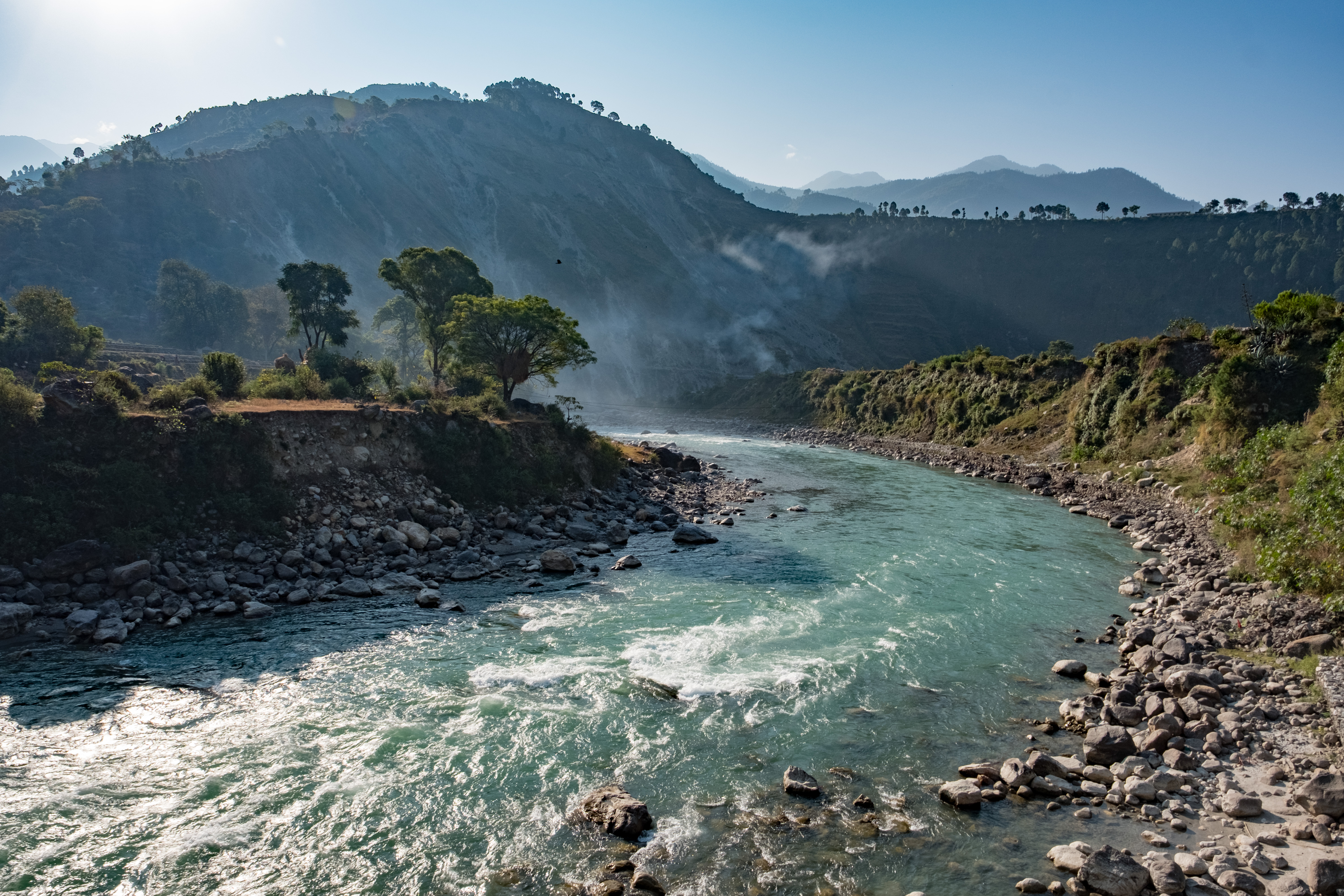
- Seti River in 2017

Physical characteristics
- Source
  - location: Slopes of Api and Nampa peaks

Basin features
- River system: Ghagra River

The Seti River is an important tributary of the Karnali river system that drains western Nepal.

== Course ==
The Seti originates from the snow fields and glaciers around the twin peaks of Api and Nampa in the south-facing slopes of the main Himalayas. The area is near the trijunction of the borders of Nepal, India (Kumaon, Uttarakhand), and China (Tibet). The river first flows in a south-easterly direction, then turns and flows in a south-westerly and finally south-easterly direction again before joining the Karnali or Ghaghara River. It has cut a spectacular gorge across the Mahabharat Range and appears to be lost amongst caves and tunnels for a short distance.
