= Api (mountain) =

Mountain in Darchula District, Nepal

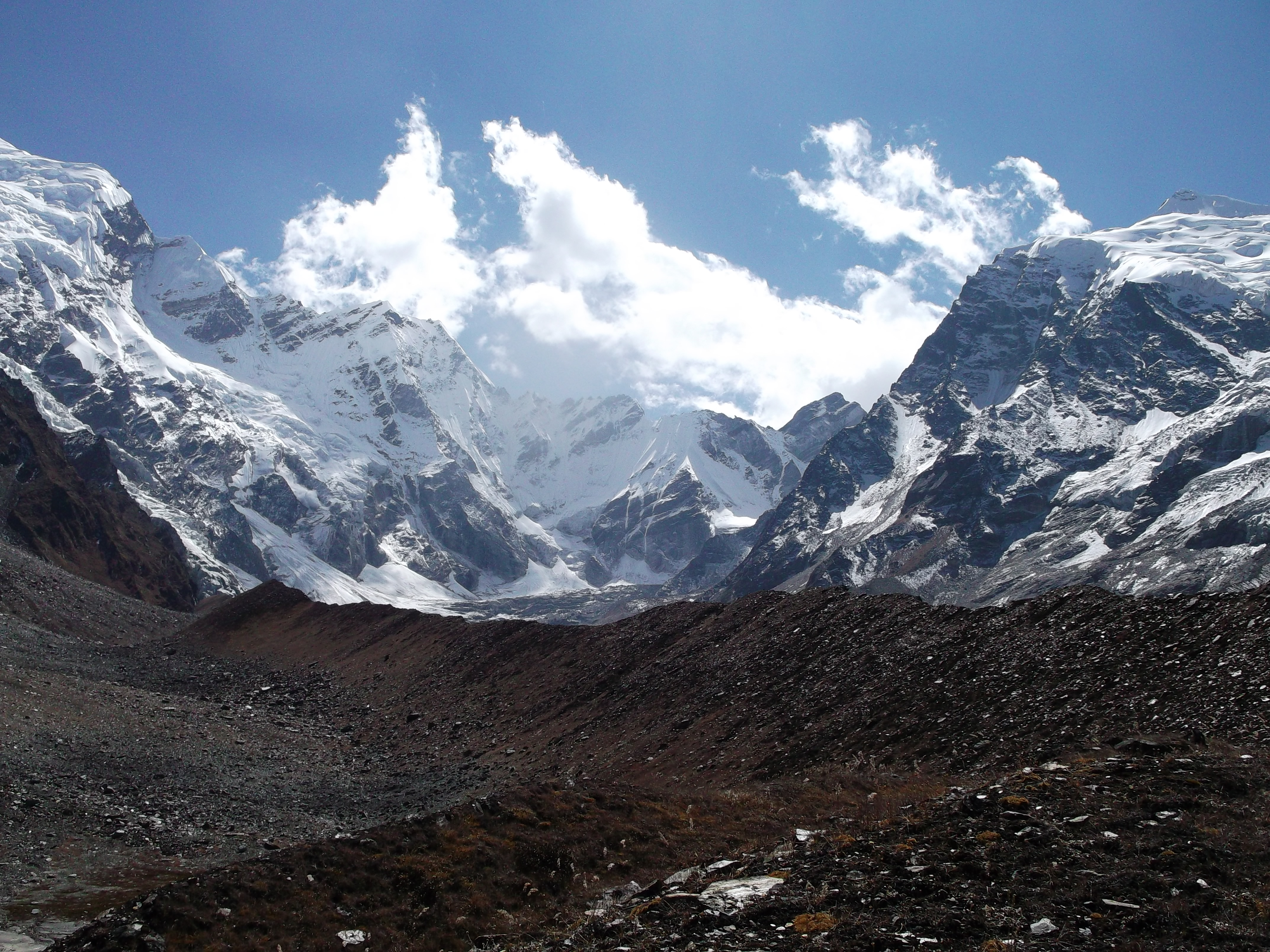
- Approached from the Mahakali Khola, the southern/western aspects of Api.

Highest point
- Elevation: 7,132 m (23,399 ft)
- Prominence: 2,040 m (6,690 ft)
- Listing: Ultras
- Coordinates: 30°00′15″N 80°56′00″E

Geography
- Location within Sudurpashchim Province Location within Nepal
- Country: Nepal
- District: Darchula District
- Parent range: Yoka Pahar Subsection, Gurans Himal, Himalayas

Climbing
- First ascent: 10 May 1960 by K. Hirabayashi, Gyaltsen Norbu
- Easiest route: rock/snow/ice climb

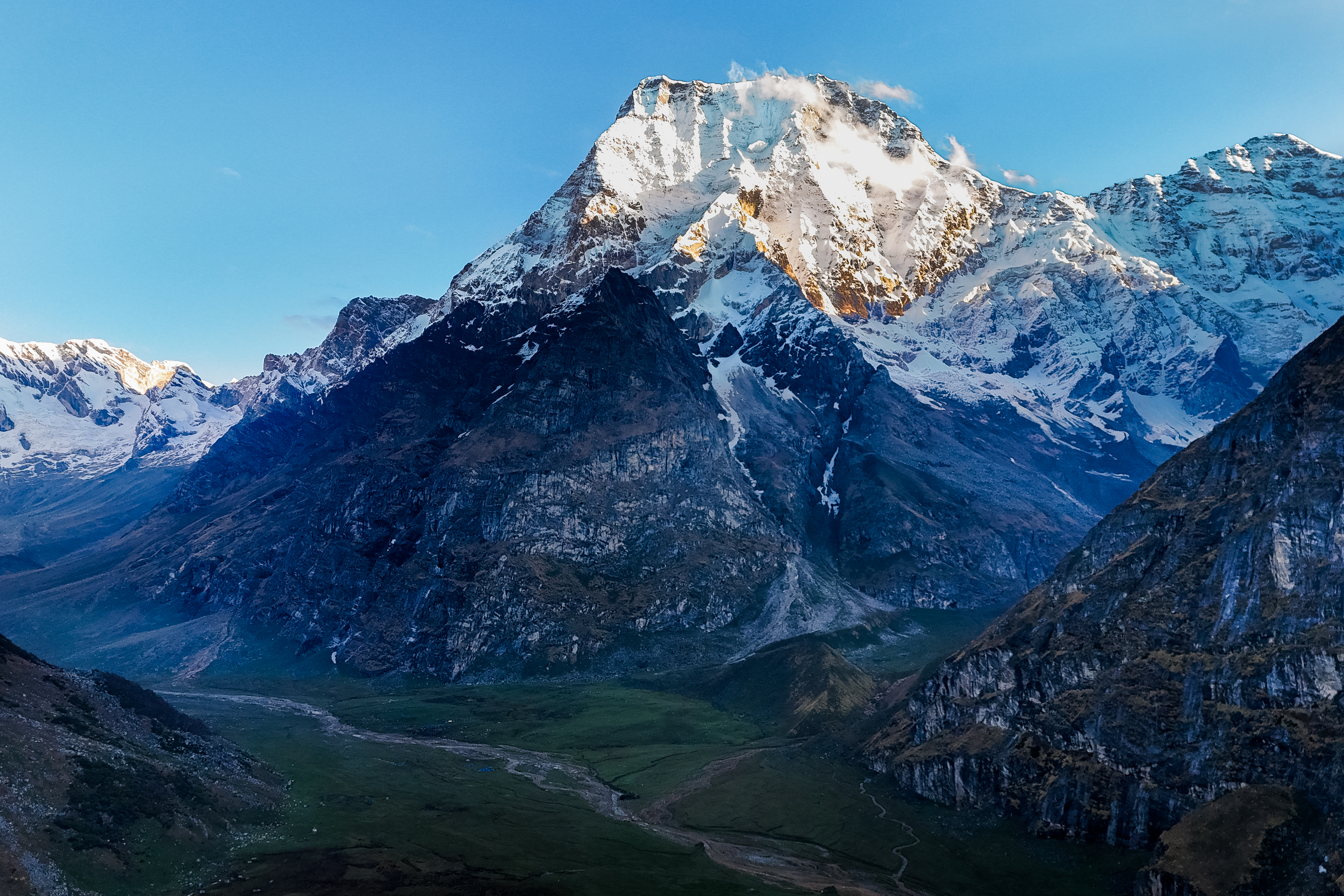
Api south face

Api, also known as Api Himal, is the highest peak in the Yoka Pahar section of the Gurans Himal, a subrange of the western Himalayas. It is located in Darchula District of Sudurpashchim Province, in the far northwestern region of Nepal, near the country's international border. Standing at an elevation of 7,132 metres (23,399 ft), Api is known for its dramatic rise from the surrounding terrain, making it one of the most prominent peaks in the region despite being relatively less frequented by climbers. It is a little-known peak in a rarely visited part of the Himalayas, but it rises dramatically over the low surrounding terrain.

== Notable features ==
Although low in elevation among the major mountains of Nepal, Api is exceptional in its rise above local terrain; the surrounding valleys are significantly lower than those surrounding most higher Himalayan peaks.

Api peak's south face rises 3,300 metres (10,830 ft) above its base.

== Climbing history ==
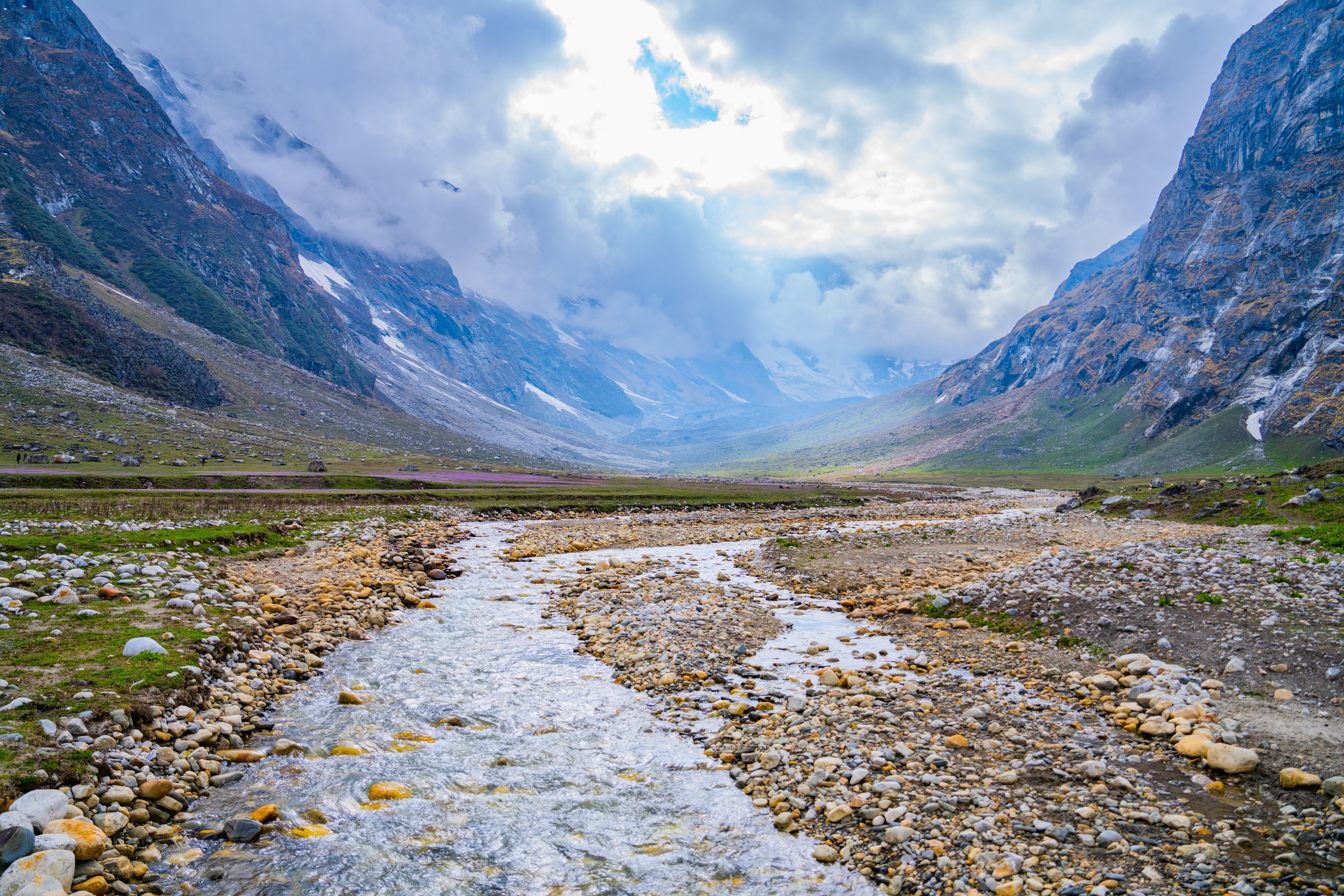
Api Bascamp(Darchula, Nepal)

The Api region was visited by Westerners in 1899, 1905 and 1936, but the peak was not attempted until 1953 on a visit by W. H. Murray a Scottish Mountaineer with John Tyson. This attempt was unsuccessful, as was another, by Italians, in 1954 which resulted in the death of two expedition members.

The first ascent of Api occurred in 1960. The Doshisha Alpine Society of Japan successfully completed the Northwest Face route attempted by the 1954 party.

In 1980, a British Army Mountaineering Association expedition made an attempt to climb the peak by the south face reaching within a few hundred metres of the summit.

On 24 December 1983, Polish climbers Tadeusz Piotrowski and Andrzej Bieluń made the first winter ascent. Bieluń had reached the summit first alone but did not return to camp.

The Himalayan Index lists three more ascents of the peak, in 1978, 1996, and 2001.

== See also ==
- List of ultras of the Himalayas
