= Jethi Bahurani =

Mountain in Nepal

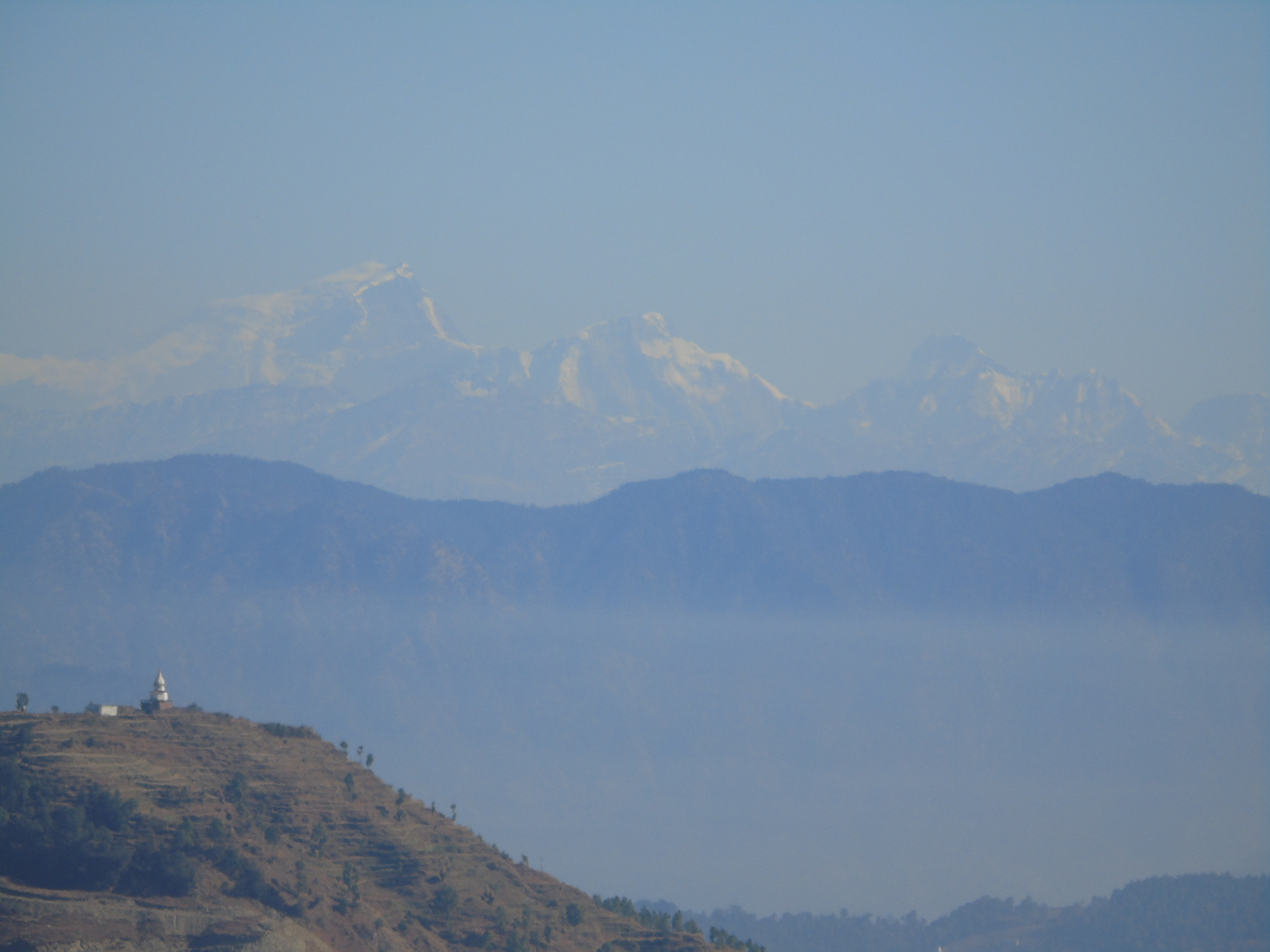
- Jethi Bahurani peak in Far Western Nepal

Highest point
- Elevation: 6,850 m (22,470 ft)
- Prominence: 1,558 m (5,112 ft)
- Listing: Ultra
- Coordinates: 29°53′00″N 81°02′27″E

Geography
- Location within Sudurpashchim Province Location within Nepal
- Location: Darchula District, Nepal
- Parent range: Himalayas

Jethi Bahurani is mountain in the Himalayas of Nepal. Located in Darchula District, it has a summit elevation of 6,850 meters above sea level.

== See also ==
- List of mountains in Nepal
- List of ultras of the Himalayas
