= Swargadwari Municipality =

Swargadwari Municipality स्वर्गद्वारी नगरपालिका
- Municipality
- Location of the municipality in Province Swargadwari Municipality (Nepal)
- Coordinates: 28.16°N 82.69°E
- Country: Nepal
- Province: Lumbini Province
- District: Pyuthan District
- No. of wards: 11
- Established: 10 March 2017
- Incorporated (VDC): Kochibang, Swargadwarikhal, Bhingri, Sari, Belbas, Barjibang and Gothibang
- Admin HQ.: Bhingri

Government
  - Type: Mayor–council
  - Body: Swargadwari Municipality Municipality
  - Mayor: Mr. Tek Bahadur Bhandari
  - Deputy Mayor: Mr. Min Raj Rana

Area
  - Total: 224.70 km^{2} (86.76 sq mi)

Population (2011)
  - Total: 30,940
- Time zone: UTC+05:45 (NPT)
- Website: swargadwarimun.gov.np

Swargadwari (Nepali: स्वर्गद्वारी) is a municipality located in Pyuthan District of Lumbini Province of Nepal. The municipality was established on 10 March 2017 merging the former Kochibang, Swargadwarikhal, Bhingri, Sari, Belbas, Barjibang and Gothibang The municipality is divided into 9 wards and the headquarter (admin centre) of the municipality declared at Bhingri. The municipality spans 224.70 square kilometres (86.76 sq mi) of area, with a total population of 30,940 individuals according to a 2011 Nepal census.
