= 2024 visit by Pope Francis to Indonesia =

2024 State Visit and Apostolic Journey of Pope Francis to Indonesia
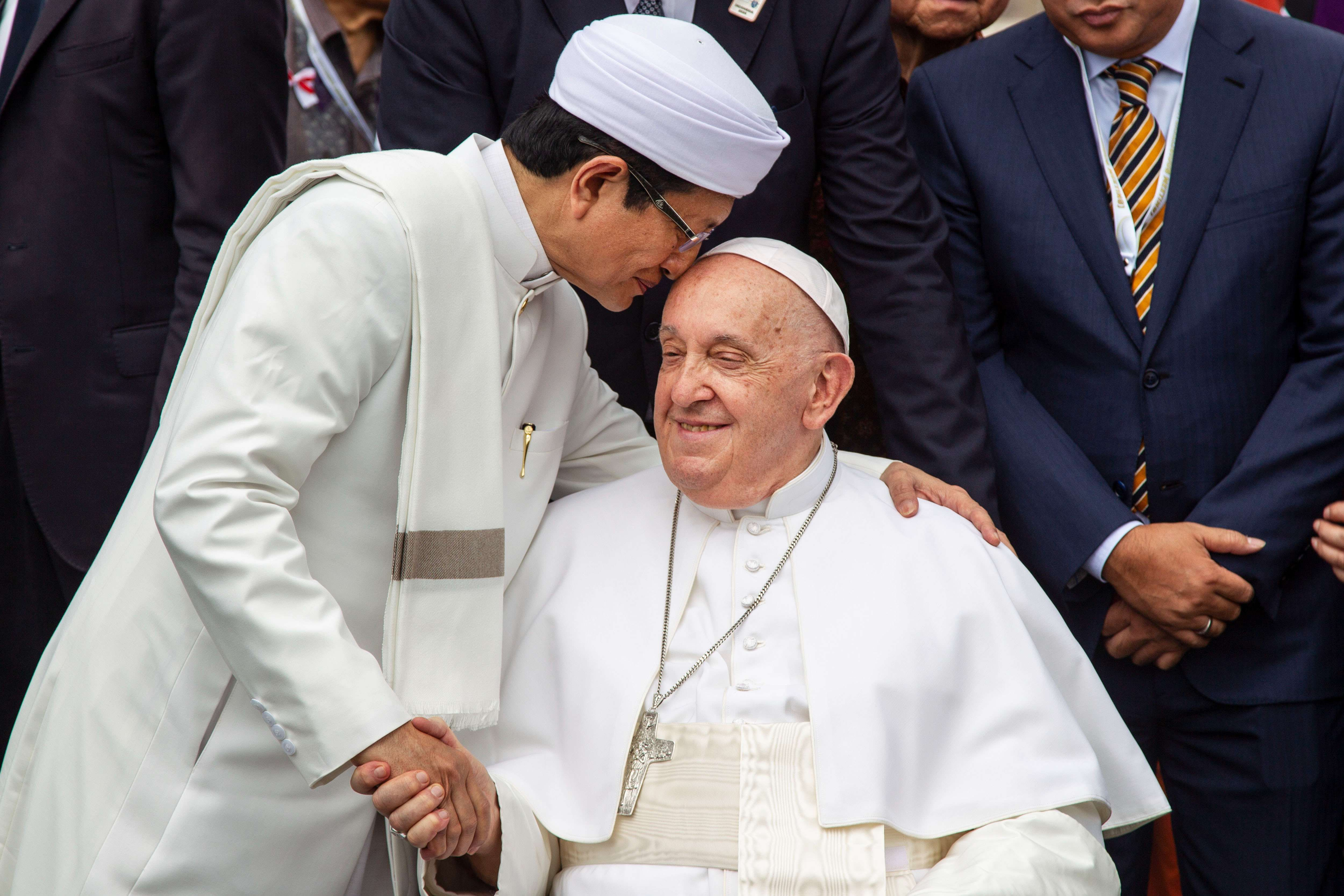
- Grand Imam Nasaruddin Umar kisses the forehead of Pope Francis
- Date: 3–6 September 2024
- Location: Jakarta
- Theme: Faith, Fraternity and Compassion (Indonesian: Iman, Persaudaraan dan Bela Rasa)
- Organized by: Holy See; Bishops' Conference of Indonesia; Government of Indonesia
- Website: Official website

Pope Francis made a pastoral and state visit to Jakarta, Indonesia, from 3 to 6 September 2024. He became the third pontiff to visit the country, following Paul VI on 3‒4 December 1970 and John Paul II on 8‒12 October 1989. The theme of his visit was "Faith, Fraternity, and Compassion" (Indonesian: Iman, Persaudaraan dan Bela Rasa).

== Background ==
=== Invitation and planning ===
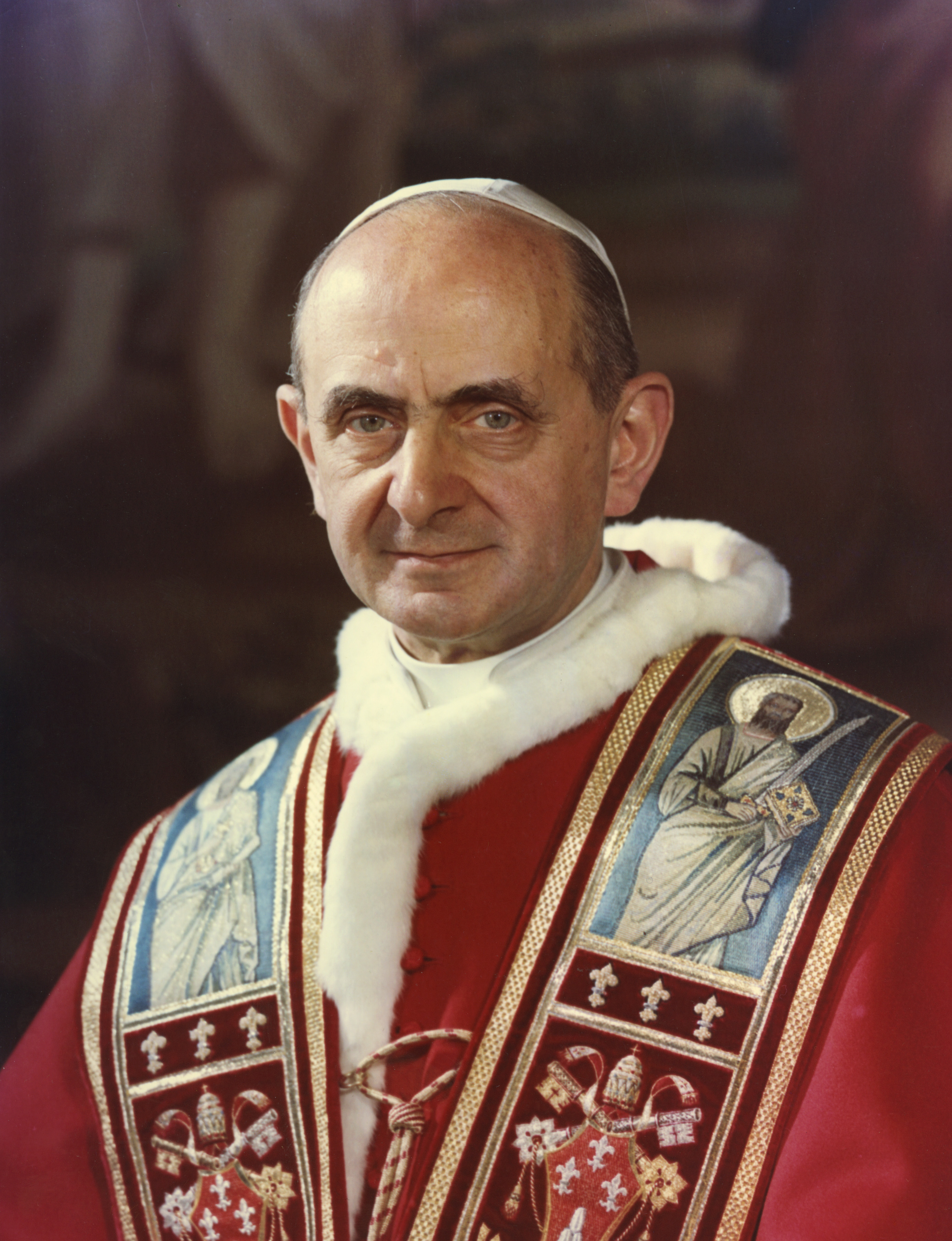
Pope Paul VI and Pope John Paul II are the only two popes to have visited Indonesia before Pope Francis.

Pope Francis himself was originally set to visit Indonesia in 2020, as part of an apostolic journey also including East Timor and Papua New Guinea. The visit aimed to promote interfaith dialogue, especially significant given Indonesia's status as the largest Muslim-majority country. The visit was expected to strengthen ties between diverse religious communities, particularly between Catholics and Muslims. However, the visit was canceled due to the COVID-19 pandemic. Travel restrictions, health concerns, and the need to avoid large gatherings forced the Vatican to adjust plans. No rescheduled date was announced at the time, with future plans dependent on the global situation.

In 2024, the Indonesian government, through President Joko Widodo, extended an official invitation to the Holy See for the visit. This invitation was officially conveyed on 25 March 2024, by Archbishop Piero Pioppo, the Apostolic Nuncio to Indonesia. The four-day visit to Indonesia, lasting from 3-6 September, marks his 45th international trip, making it the longest of his papacy. Previously, some sources stated that Pope Francis will also visit East Nusa Tenggara and West Kalimantan. However it was later outed from the schedule for conciseness.

== Agenda ==
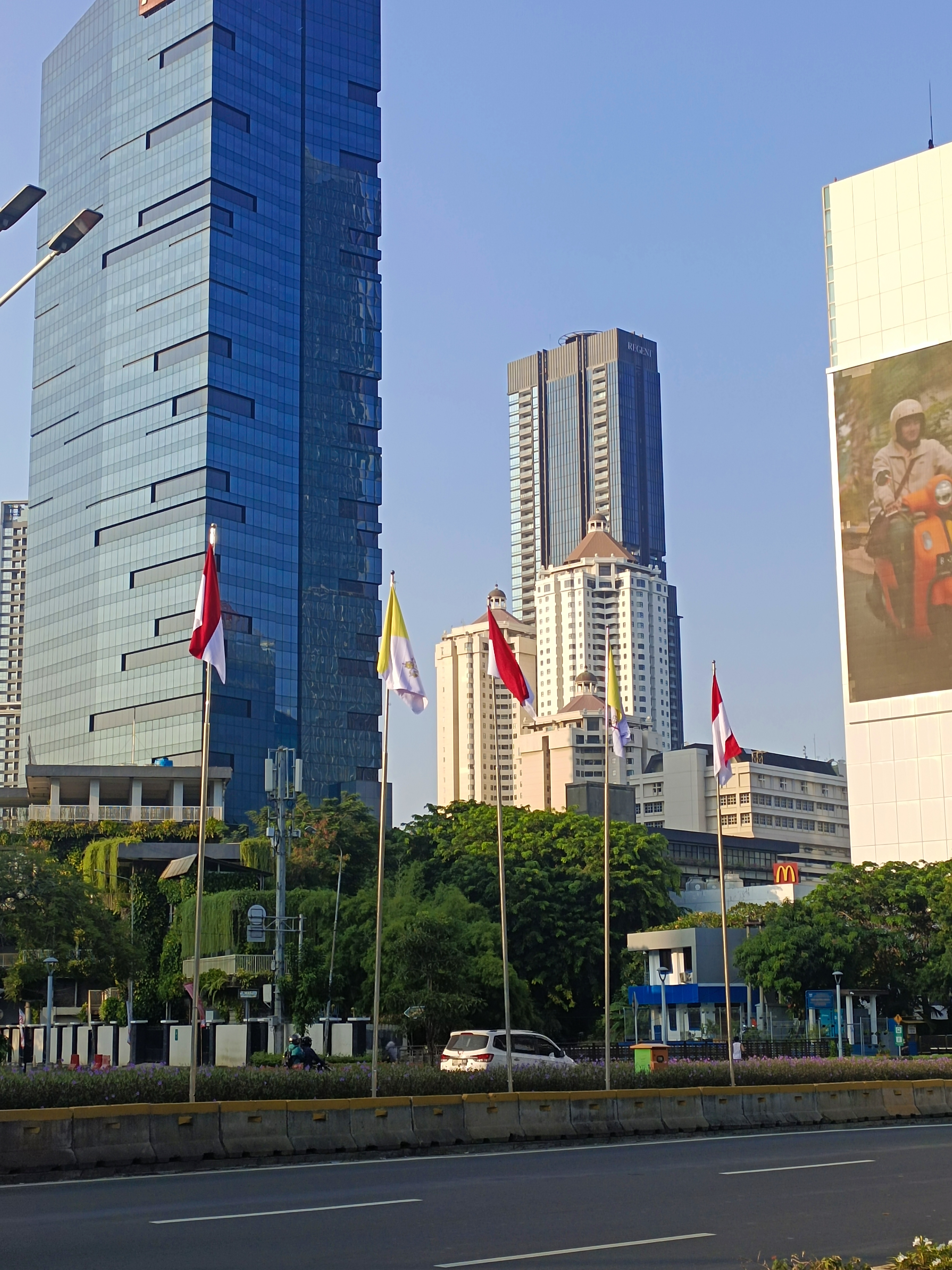
The Indonesian flag and the Vatican flag flew on Jalan Jenderal Sudirman during the Pope's visit.

Based on official information released by the Bishops' Conference of Indonesia, the agenda of Pope Francis's agenda while in Indonesia as confirmed by the Holy See Press Office are:

=== Monday, 2 September 2024 ===
Departure from Leonardo da Vinci International Airport, Fiumicino, Rome to Jakarta

=== Tuesday, 3 September 2024 ===
Official welcome by the Indonesian Government at Soekarno-Hatta International Airport

=== Wednesday, 4 September 2024 ===
- Official welcoming ceremony in the courtyard of the Merdeka Palace, Jakarta
- Honorary Visit to the President of Indonesia, Joko Widodo
- Meeting with government, civil society and the diplomatic corps at the Istana Negara Hall
- Private Meeting with Members of the Jesuit Society at the Apostolic Nunciature to Indonesia (Vatican Embassy)
- Meeting with Indonesian Bishops, Priests, Deacons, Consecrated Life Workers, Seminarians and Catechists at Jakarta Cathedral
- Meeting with Young Scholas of Scholas Occurrentes at Grha Pemuda

=== Thursday, 5 September 2024 ===
- Interfaith meeting at Istiqlal Mosque and visit to the Tunnel of Friendship, signing of Istiqlal 2024 Joint Declaration
- Meeting with Beneficiaries of Charitable Organisations at the Bishops' Conference of Indonesia Office
- Presiding over Holy Mass at Gelora Bung Karno Main Stadium

=== Friday, 6 September 2024 ===
Departure ceremony from Soekarno-Hatta International Airport to Port Moresby, Papua New Guinea

== Departure and reception ==
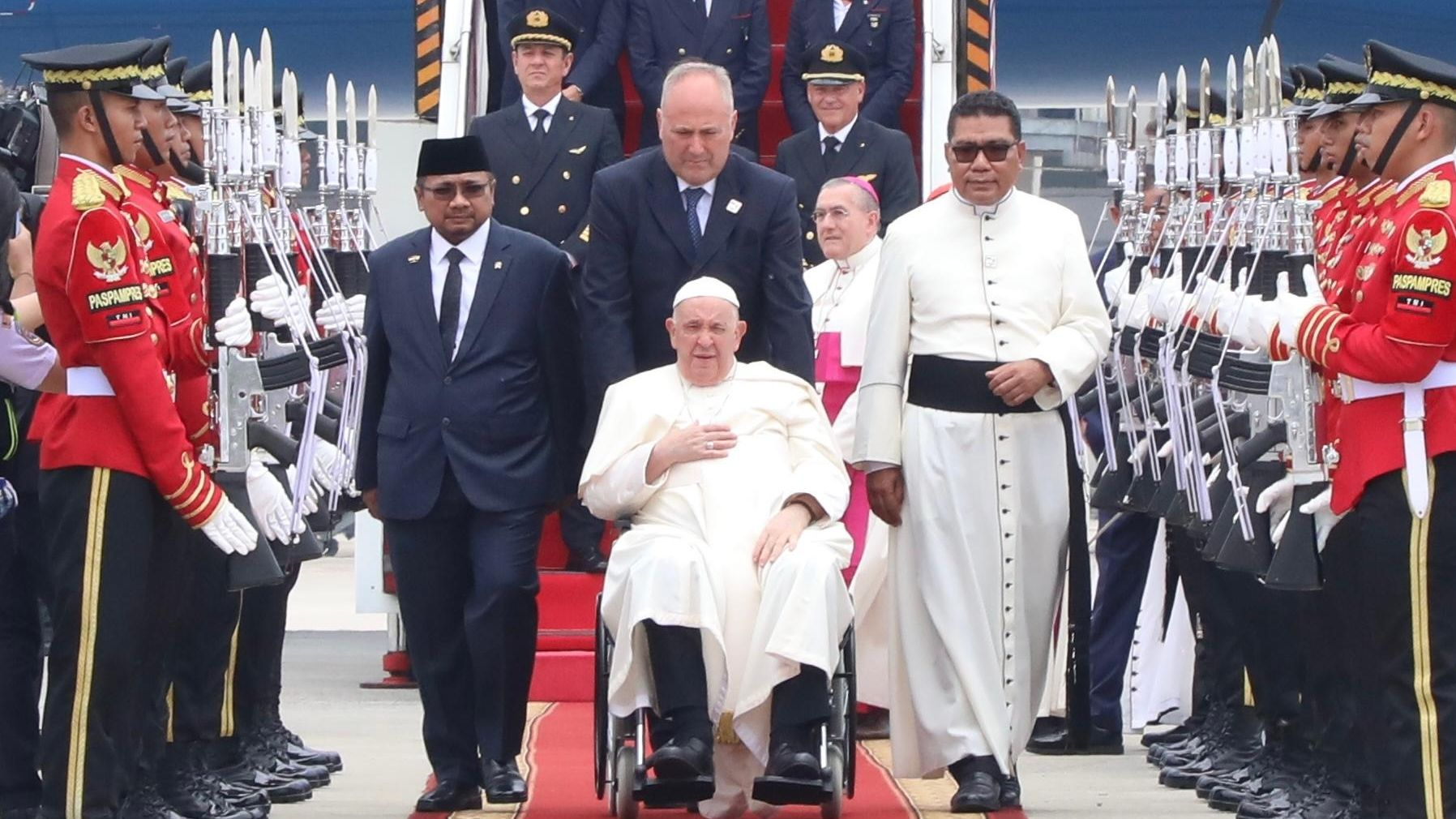
Welcoming Pope Francis at Soekarno-Hatta Airport by Minister of Religious Affairs, Yaqut Cholil Qoumas.

On Monday, 2 September 2024, Pope Francis departed from Leonardo da Vinci International Airport, Fiumicino, Rome to Jakarta at approximately 17:32 CEST (UTC+02:00). The journey covered more than 10,800 kilometres and took almost 13 hours. He used a commercial aircraft run by ITA Airways with flight code AZ4000. The flight is also referred to as 'Shepherd One'. The aircraft used was an Airbus A330-941 with register code EI-HJS, traveling on an ITA Airways commercial aircraft. During the flight to Jakarta, the Pope greeted around 85 journalists on board, thanking them personally. Several journalists presented him with meaningful gifts, including a replica of a historical inscription from Xian, a torch used by refugees, and a red football shirt in memory of an 11-year-old boy, symbolizing his commitment to compassion, solidarity, and the protection of migrants and refugees. Pope Francis's decision to use a commercial ITA Airways jet for his apostolic visit to Indonesia was met with widespread praise from Indonesian social media and media outlets. With many lauded his "humble" approach to the visit. Inspired by the Pope, President Joko Widodo chose to use the Toyota Kijang Innova Zenix minivan as a form of respect for Pope Francis's simplicity. And so his presidential cars such as the Mercedes Benz S600 Guard or Toyota Alphard were ditched in preference to the Kijang Innova Zenix for certain activities during the pope's visit to Indonesia.

=== Arrival in Indonesia ===
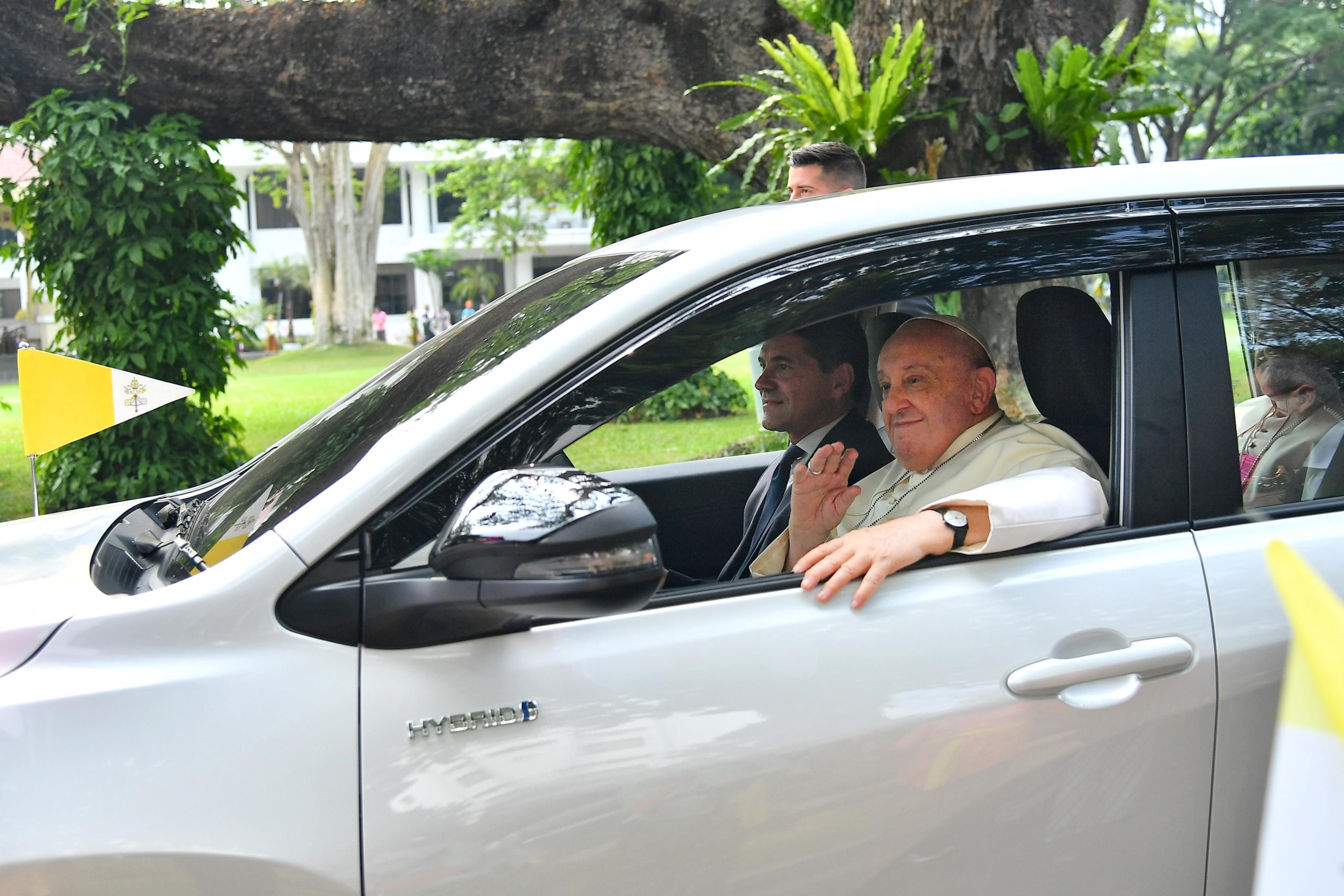
Pope Francis arrives at the Merdeka Palace in a Toyota Kijang Innova Zenix minivan after refusing to use a luxury car. Opting to be driven in a car used by everyday Indonesians.

Upon his arrival in Indonesia at 11.19 am (UTC+07:00), Pope Francis was welcomed by the Minister of Religious Affairs of the Republic of Indonesia, Yaqut Cholil Qoumas. He was also welcomed by Member of the Presidential Advisory Council of the Republic of Indonesia, Gandi Sulistiyanto and Indonesian Ambassador to the Holy See of the Vatican, Michael Trias Kuncahyono. A number of clergy who also picked up Pope Francis included the Apostolic Nuncio to Indonesia, Piero Pioppo, the Archbishop of Jakarta, Ignatius Cardinal Suharyo, and the Chairman of the Indonesian Bishops‘ Conference (KWI), Antonius Subianto Bunjamin, O.S.C., as well as the Secretary of the Vatican Embassy in Indonesia, Msgr Michael Andrew Pawlowicz. The Pope then received a ‘Bhinneka Tunggal Ika’ flower arrangement made of vegetables, fruits, and herbs from Indonesia, symbolising Indonesia as an agrarian country. He then sat at the front in a Kijang Innova Zenix. The Pope then headed to the Nunciatura (Embassy of the Holy See of the Vatican) located at Jalan Medan Merdeka Timur, Jakarta, where he was staying during his visit to Jakarta. Along the way across Jalan Jenderal Sudirman and Jalan M.H. Thamrin, he opened the glass of his car and greeted the people standing on the roadside.

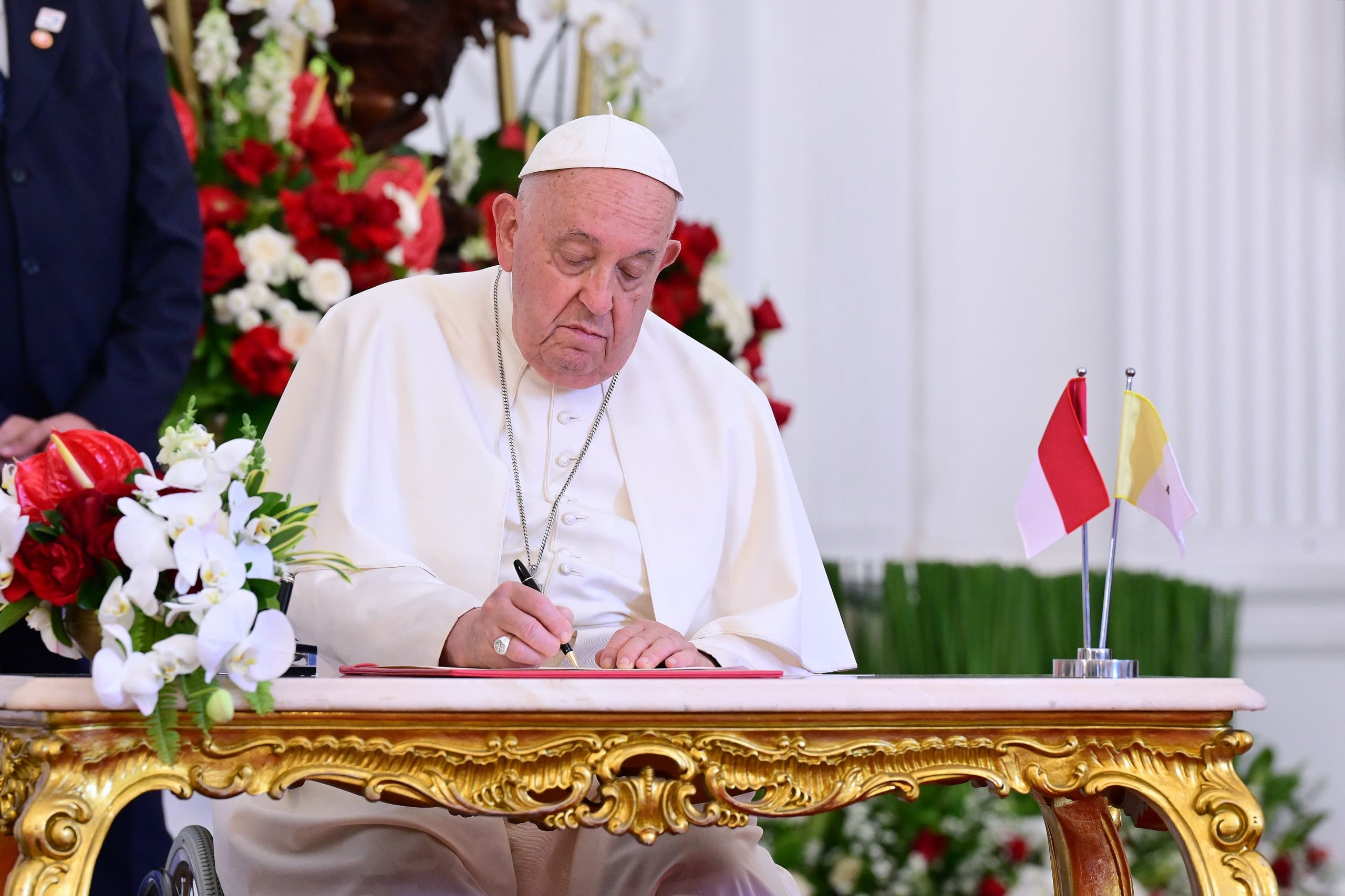
Pope Francis fills the guest book at the Merdeka Palace.

The following day, on 4 September 2024, Pope Francis visited the Merdeka Palace, where he attended a state ceremony with President Joko Widodo. He was welcomed by the Nusantara Guard and a number of children dressed in traditional Indonesian clothes. The Vatican anthem 'Inno e Marcia Pontificale' and the Indonesian national anthem 'Indonesia Raya' were played, accompanied by a 21-gun salvo. Pope Francis filled out a guest book, in which he wrote;

"Immersed in the beauty of this land, a place of encounter and dialogue between different cultures and religions, I wish the Indonesian people growth in faith, fraternity, and compassion. God bless Indonesia!"

— Pope Francis, On his visit to Indonesia, as written in the palace guest book.

The officials accompanying each head of state were previously introduced. Officials accompanying President Joko Widodo included Minister of Defence and President-Elect Prabowo Subianto; Coordinating Minister for Human Development and Culture, Muhadjir Effendy; Minister of Foreign Affairs, Retno Marsudi; Minister of State Secretary, Pratikno; Minister of Religious Affairs, Yaqut Cholil Qoumas, Cabinet Secretary, Pramono Anung; and Indonesian Ambassador to the Holy See, Michael Trias Kuncahyono. The Pope was accompanied by a number of Holy See officials, including Luis Antonio Cardinal Tagle, Pro-Prefect of the First Evangelisation Section of the Dicastery for Evangelization; Archbishop Edgar Peña Parra, Substitute for General Affairs at the Secretariat of State of the Holy See; and Archbishop Paul Richard Gallagher, Secretary of the Section for Foreign Relations and International Organisations at the Secretariat of State of the Holy See.

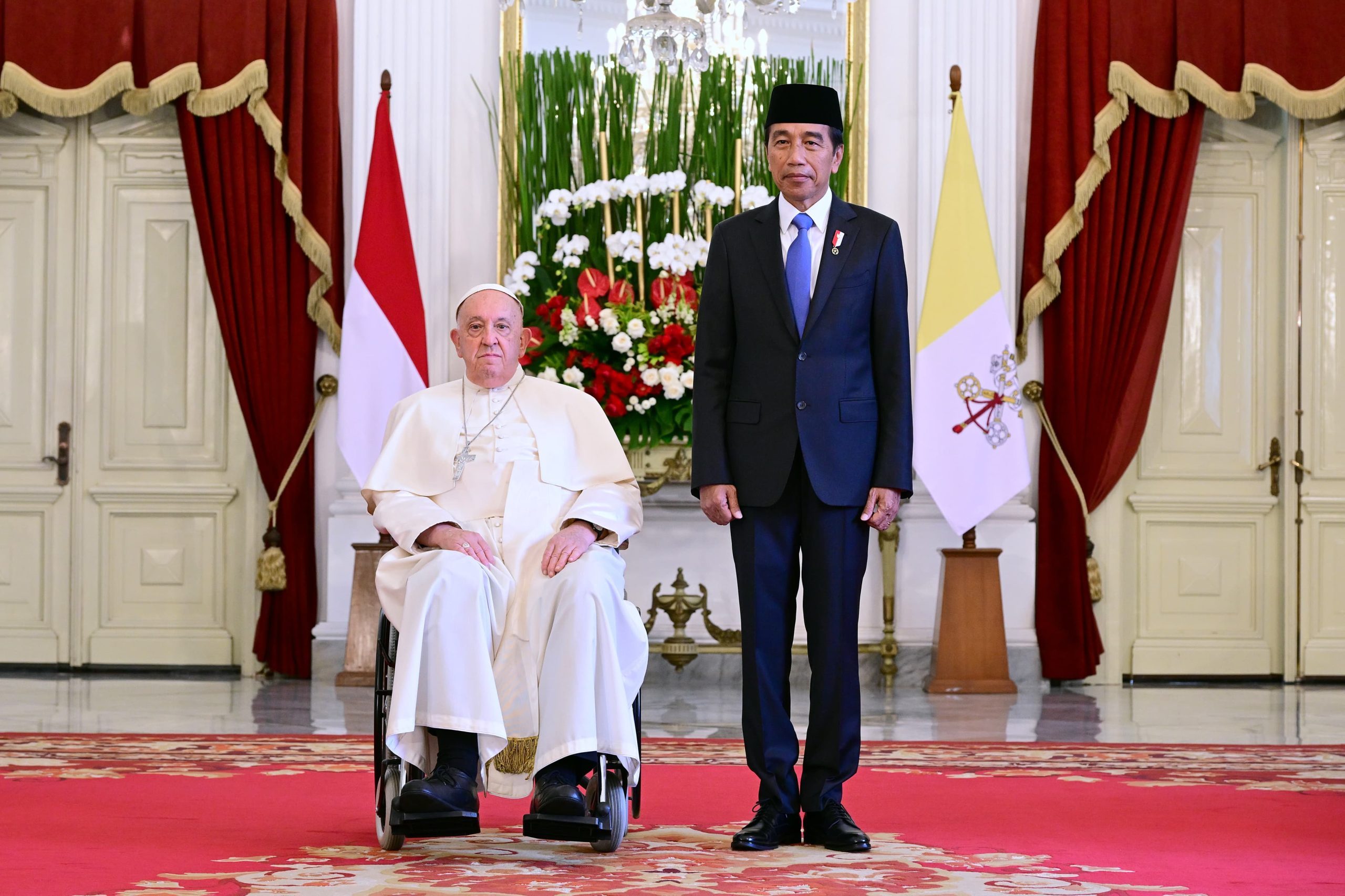
Pope Francis with President Joko Widodo at the Merdeka Palace.

Pope Francis and President Joko Widodo then held a brief meeting on the veranda of the Merdeka Palace. The Pope then met with a number of government officials, civil society, and the diplomatic corps at the State Palace. During the meeting, Pope Francis mentioned Bhinneka Tunggal Ika as a reflection of Indonesia's diversity and also the Preamble of the 1945 Constitution of the Republic of Indonesia by referring to the presence of God mentioned in the text.

== Meeting with members of the clergy ==
On the afternoon of 4 September 2024, Pope Francis, the first Jesuit pope, held a closed meeting with the clergy of the Society of Jesus in Indonesia. The meeting was held at the Apostolic Nunciature for Indonesia. The meeting was attended by around 200 Jesuits. Some of the Jesuits present included the Archbishop Emeritus of Jakarta, Julius Cardinal Darmaatmadja, S.J.

In the afternoon, Pope Francis headed to the Church of Our Lady of the Assumption for a meeting (audience) with Indonesian bishops, priests, deacons, consecrated people, seminarians, and catechists, totalling around 1,200 people. The Pope's presence was welcomed with a traditional angklung ensemble. He then entered the Cathedral Church by first kissing the cross and sprinkling holy water given by the Cathedral's Head Priest, Fr. P. Albertus Hani Rudi Hartoko, S.J. During the meeting, the Pope gave a catechesis on the three words that became the theme of his visit to Indonesia, namely faith, brotherhood, and compassion. Before giving his catechesis, several testimonies were delivered, among others by R.D. Florens Maxi Un Bria (Chairman of UNIO Indonesia/the association of diocesan priests in Indonesia), Sr. Rina Rosalina, M.C. (nun), Nikolas Wijaya (catechist/teacher of Catholic Religious Education at SMA Regina Pacis Bogor), and Agnes Natalia (catechist/teacher of Catholic Religious Education at SMA Santa Ursula Jakarta).

== Meeting with the laity ==
After a meeting at the Jakarta Cathedral Church, the Pope met with a number of activists of the Scholas Occurrentes organisation. The organisation is a global youth education movement founded by Pope Francis in 2013 in Argentina. The meeting took place at the Grha Pemuda located in the Jakarta Cathedral complex. During the meeting, a Scholas Occurentes volunteer from Buton Regency, Ana Nuraulia, gave her testimony. The meeting was also attended by Minister of Education, Culture, Research and Technology, Nadiem Makarim, and his wife, and child. Indonesian Coordinating Minister for Maritime Affairs and Investment, Luhut Binsar Pandjaitan, gave the Pope a mangrove tree seedling. The Pope blessed the seedlings and gave land and water for the mangroves. On 8 September 2024, the seedlings were sent and planted in the Kura Kura Special Economic Zone, Denpasar, Bali.

On the afternoon of 5 September 2024, Pope Francis met with beneficiaries of the charity organisation as well as a number of people with disabilities. The meeting was held in the Henry Soetio Hall of the Indonesian Bishops' Conference Building. The Laetitia Disability Choir, a choir of people with disabilities under the auspices of the Archdiocese of Jakarta, sang a number of songs during the meeting. The meeting was also part of the 100th anniversary of the founding of the Indonesian Bishops‘ Conference (KWI), which was held without celebration and received appreciation from Pope Francis.

== Interfaith meeting ==
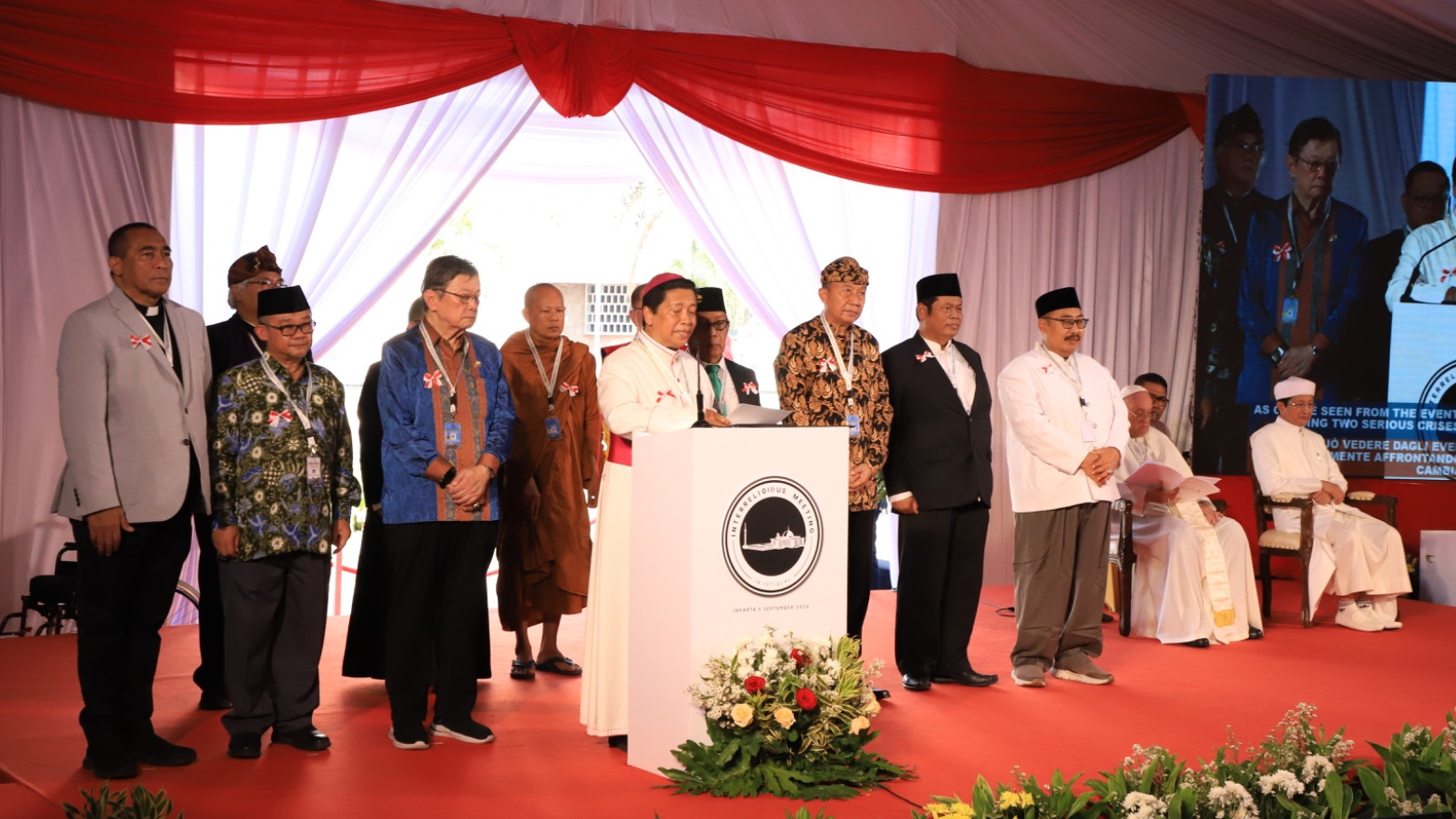
Reading of the Istiqlal Joint Declaration by interfaith figures

On the morning of 5 September 2024, Pope Francis visited the Istiqlal Mosque, the largest mosque in Southeast Asia. He met with the Grand Imam of the Istiqlal Mosque, Nasaruddin Umar. This meeting was also attended by a number of Indonesian officials and scholars. His presence was welcomed with the accompaniment of marawis by 12 boys. Pope Francis visited and blessed the Tunnel of Friendship. The Tunnel of Friendship connects the Istiqlal Mosque with the Jakarta Cathedral Church as a sign of friendship and solidarity between Muslims and Christianity. The Pope then attended an interfaith meeting. The meeting began with the reading of the Quran. The Quranic verses were recited by Kayla Nur Syahwa Syakhila, a female hafizah for the visually impaired. In braille, she recited the Surah Al-Baqarah verse 62 and Surah Al-Hujurat verse 13. Both of these verses were recited as it held importance about faith, tolerance, and living together. The Surah Al-Baqara 2:62 had a meaning about anyone among the followers of the heavenly religions who believes in Allah and the Last Day, will experience a heart free from fear and sadness. Similarly, Surah Al-Hujurat 49:13 addresses the total equality of humankind, emphasizing the significance of coexisting amid differences with the goal of understanding and mutual recognition among different people.

R.D. Mikail Endro Suseno, Episcopal Vicar for Community Affairs of the Diocese of Bogor then recited the parable of the Good Samaritan from the Gospel of Luke chapter 10 verses 25-37. During the meeting, the signing of the Istiqlal 2024 Joint Declaration was also attended by interfaith leaders. The text was read by the Chairman of the Commission for Interreligious Relations and Trust of the Indonesian Bishops Conference, Christophorus Tri Harsono (Bishop of Purwokerto) and the Head of the Riayah Division of the Istiqlal Mosque Ismail Cawidu. Deputy Minister of Religion, Saiful Rahmat Dasuki gave souvenirs to the Pope in the form of friendship coins and a replica of the Istiqlal Mosque. As Pope Francis was preparing to leave the mosque after a group photo session, Nasaruddin Umar leaned over and kissed the Pope on the forehead. In return, Pope Francis grasped Nasaruddin Umar's hand, kissed it, and held it to his cheek.

== Eucharist Celebration ==
The Eucharistic celebration took place on the afternoon of September 5, 2024 at the Bung Karno Stadium. The mass was attended by more than 80,000 Catholics from various regions in Indonesia.

=== Preparation before mass ===
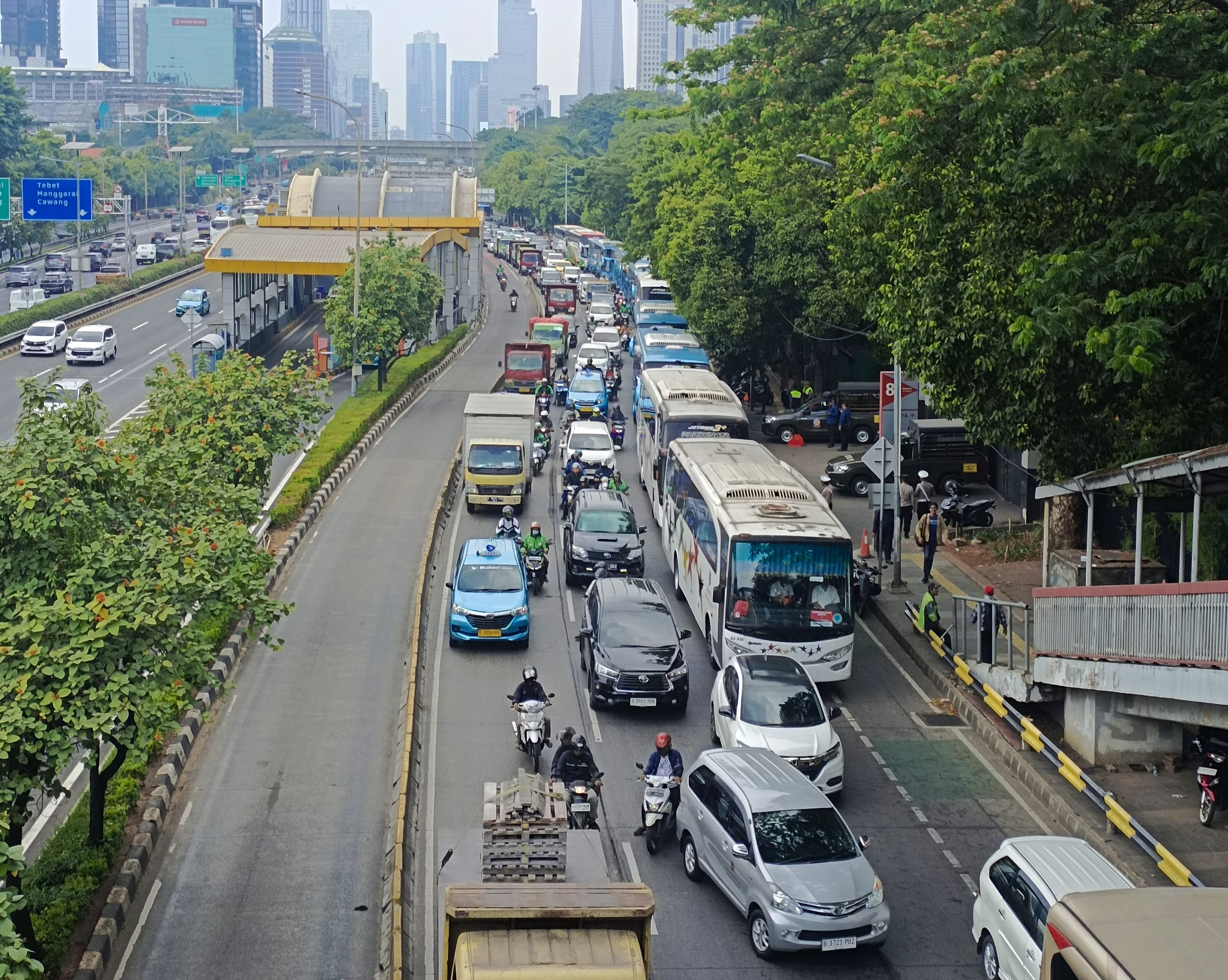
Arrival of a number of buses in a traffic jam, carrying groups of people who want to attend the Mass.

Parishioners had begun registering through their dioceses and parishes starting in July 2024. Parishioners then received wristbands with QR codes that would be scanned upon entering the Gelora Bung Karno Main Stadium and Madya Stadium complexes. Parishioners who attended from various regions came using buses prepared by their respective parishes and groups. There are nine parking pockets prepared by the Indonesian National Police.

The monks and nuns of the Carmelitae Sancti Eliae Congregation living in Cikanyere prepared for the presence of the Pope through 24 hours of non-stop prayer during 3-6 September 2024. On 29 June 2024, the Solemnity of Saints Peter and Paul, the Indonesian Bishops' Conference launched a prayer for the Holy Father's apostolic visit. The prayer was released in Bahasa Indonesia and English.

=== Pre-mass activities ===
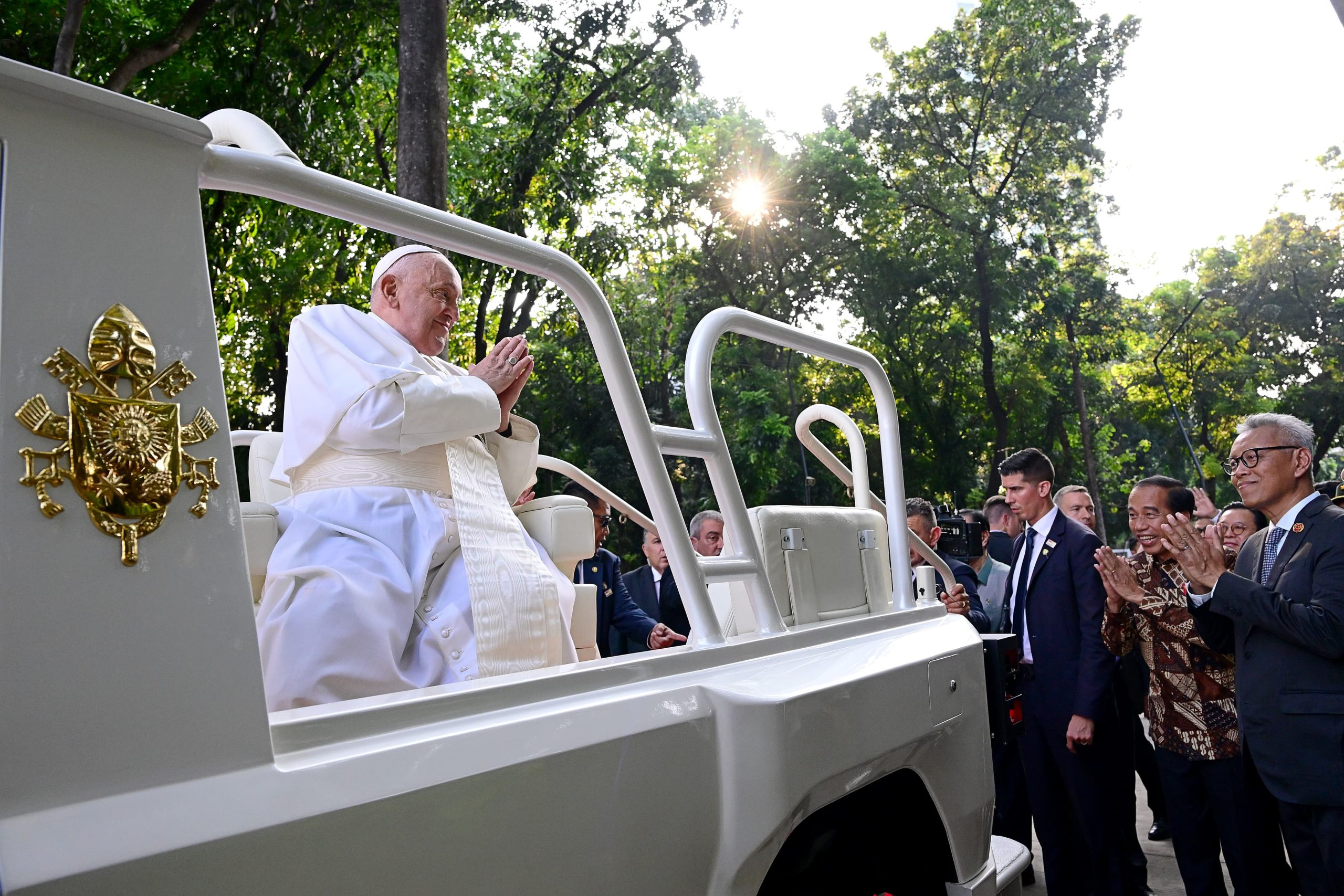
Pope Francis greets Jokowi the final time prior to the Holy Mass at Gelora Bung Karno Stadium and his departure to Papua New Guinea

Before the mass, a number of activities were held. The pre-mass activities were guided by two priests, R.D. Yustinus Ardianto and Andreas Subekti, and one sister, Sr. Hetwika Maweikere, S.J.M.J. At the beginning of the activities, the national anthem Indonesia Raya was sung by all the attendees. A number of welcome videos were played, including from the Chairman of the Committee Ignasius Jonan, the Chairman of the Bishops' Conference of Indonesia (KWI), Antonius Subianto Bunjamin, O.S.C., the Apostolic Nuncio to Indonesia, Piero Pioppo, and the Archbishop of Jakarta, Cardinal Ignatius Suharyo Hardjoatmodjo. Remarks were also delivered by Indonesian President Joko Widodo. Several songs were also performed by various groups. Twelve students sang national songs, including Tanah Airku, Indonesia Pusaka, Satu Nusa Satu Bangsa, and Rayuan Pulau Kelapa. Singers Angel Pieters and Louis Bertrand sang Goodness of God, while Lyodra Ginting and R.P. Aloysius Tamnge, M.S.C. performed Make Me a Channel of Your Peace. This song refers to the Prayer of Saintt Francis which is associated with Francis of Assisi. A talk on the visit of Pope Francis was given by three bishops, Kornelius Sipayung, O.F.M. Cap. (Archbishop of Medan), Cyprianus Hormat (Bishop of Ruteng), and Petrus Canisius Mandagi, M.S.C. (Archbishop of Merauke). Devotional activities such as Prayer with Taizé chants and Prayer of the Rosary were also conducted. The Taizé prayer was interspersed with some quotes of Pope Francis delivered to the public on several occasions, while the Prayer of the Rosary used the Events of Light. During the pre-mass activities, a drizzle of rain fell around the Gelora Bung Karno complex, although it later subsided.

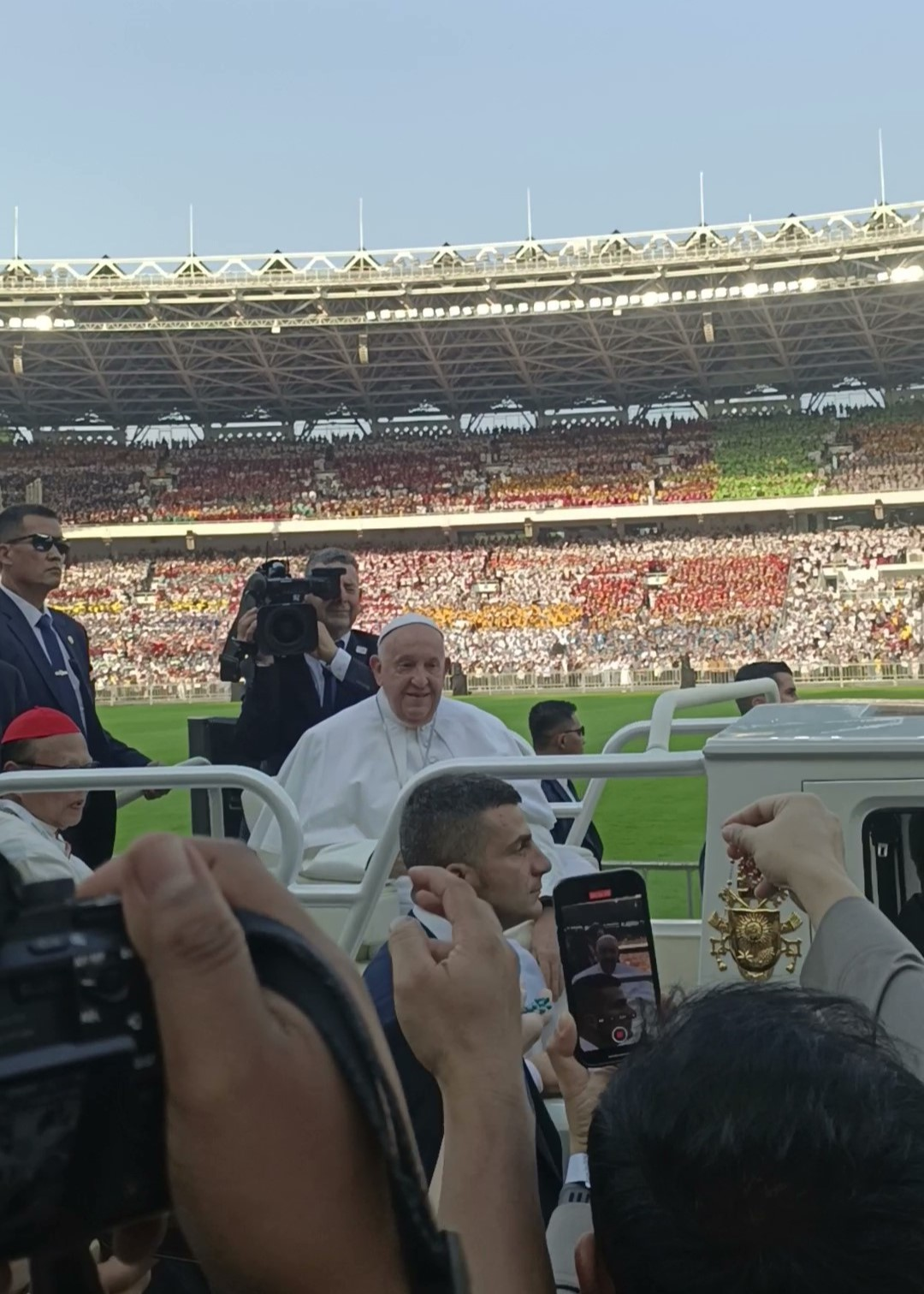
The Holy Father greeting the congregation while touring around the Gelora Bung Karno Main Stadium.

Indonesian President Joko Widodo met with Pope Francis shortly before Pope Francis met the congregation. Joko Widodo was accompanied by a number of officials, including Coordinating Minister Luhut Binsar Panjaitan, National Police Chief Listyo Sigit Prabowo, and TNI Commander Agus Subiyanto. Pope Francis then travelled around to meet the congregation at the Madya Stadium, before later greeting the congregation at the Gelora Bung Karno Main Stadium. While travelling around, Pope Francis used a Maung car made by Pindad, which was named Maung MV3 Popemobile. While the Pope was travelling around, the congregation chanted Viva Il Papa and Viva Papa Francesco, as well as the song Kristus Jaya (Victorious of Christ) and the song Ave-Ave (Di Lourdes di Gua) (Ave-Ave (In The Cave of Lourdes)). Before the mass, the congregation prepared themselves through a silentium which created silence at the mass location.

=== Conduct of the mass ===
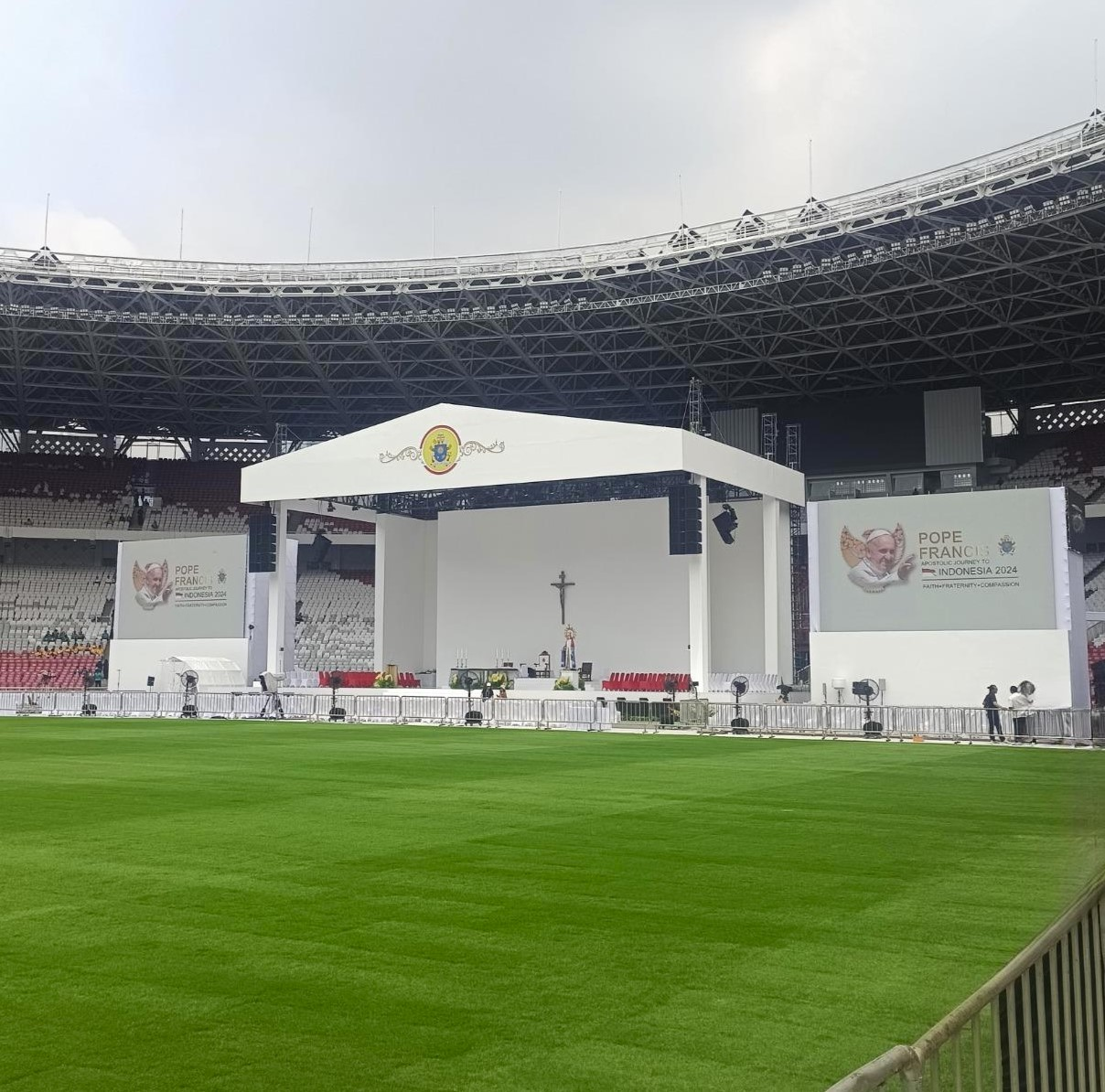
The stage used for mass

On 5 September, the Church celebrates Saint Teresa of Calcutta, so this Eucharistic Celebration is celebrated within the framework of the commemoration of Saint Teresa of Calcutta. The Eucharistic celebration begins as the liturgical officers and the bishop march towards the altar from the sacristy. Pope Francis uses a pluviale (corkscrew) in this Eucharistic Celebration. Both the pluviale, the chasuble, and the liturgical dress used by the clergy show the ornamentation of the Cross of the Archipelago. This cross represents the archipelago by combining various regional motifs, including Dayak (Kalimantan), Sumba (East Nusa Tenggara), Asmat (Papua), and Batak (North Sumatra), with the addition of Balinese and Javanese ornaments. The procession was accompanied by a number of Indonesian songs, such as Dengan Gembira (How Joyful), Kau Dipanggil Tuhan (Thou Called by God), even Bergemarlah dan Bersukaria (Rejoice and Gladful). The procession was carried out by about 60 bishops who were present, as well as a number of priests and liturgical officers. Arriving in front of the altar, Cardinal Suharyo dedicated the altar and the statue of Maria Mother of All Tribes located near the altar. Pope Francis opened the mass with the sign of the cross and a greeting said in Latin. The Pope uttered the words ‘Saya mengaku’ ('I confess' in Bahasa Indonesia) which began the declaration of penance. The Lord Have Mercy on Us (Kyrie) and Glory (Gloria) were performed in Bahasa Indonesia, followed by the Opening Prayer said by the Pope in Latin.

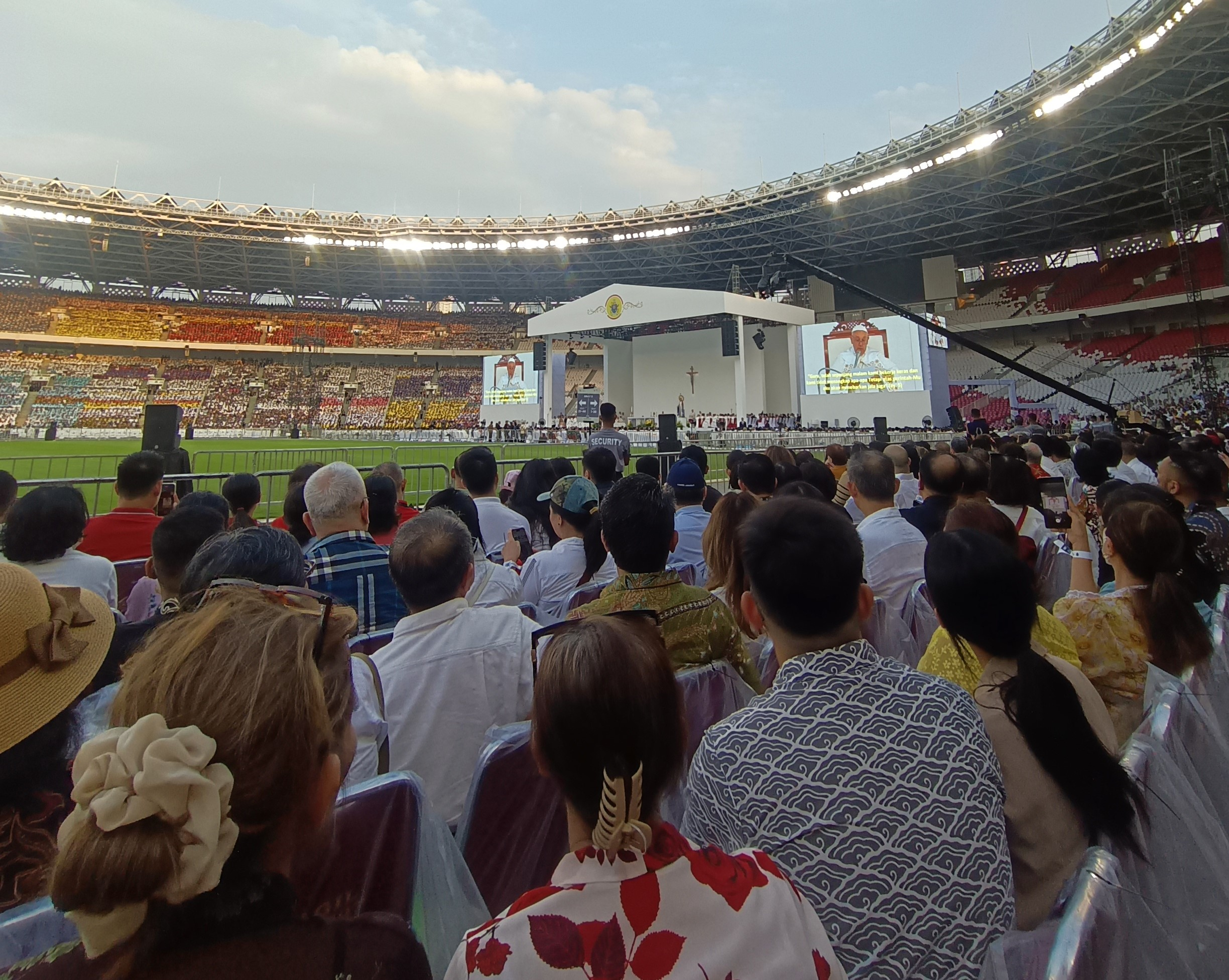
Pope Francis gave the homily in Italian

The First Reading was taken from the Apostle Paul's First Letter to the Corinthians, Chapter 3. The reading was performed by a blind man, Bernadus Dustin, who read using braille. The Psalm that followed was Psalm 24 performed by Athanasia Paramita Ika Rosarie. The Gospel reading was taken from the Gospel of Luke, Chapter 15 which tells the story of Simon Peter returning to the sea, after being instructed by Jesus to ‘go to the deep’, even though they had not caught any fish when they worked all night. All three readings were read in Indonesian. The homily was delivered by Pope Francis in Italian. The Universal Prayer was organised by a group of six people, in the six regional languages of Indonesia, namely Javanese, Toraja, Manggarai, Batak Toba, Dayak Kanayatn, and Marind.

The Eucharistic Liturgy begins with the preparation of the offering, during which the offering materials are brought before Pope Francis. The Preparation of the Offering is accompanied by a number of songs, including T'rimalah ya Bapa (Accept it, God) and Di Pulau Samadi (In Samadi Island) that originated from the Indonesian catholic book, the Madah Bakti, and also the song Kami Unjukkan, Kami Sembahkan (We Show, We Present) which was sung at a Mass presided over by Pope John Paul II at the same location in 1989. The Eucharistic Liturgy was presided over by Cardinal Suharyo who delivered the prefaces and the Eucharistic Prayer III in Latin, while the Lord's Prayer and the acclamations leading up to the reception of communion were chanted in Bahasa Indonesia. At the altar, Cardinal Suharyo was accompanied by KWI Chairman, Antonius Subianto Bunjamin, O.S.C. (Bishop of Bandung) and KWI First Vice Chairman, Adrianus Sunarko, O.F.M. (Bishop of Pangkalpinang). At the time of the consecration, Pope Francis stood on his chair while extending his right hand. The congregation then received communion, accompanied by a number of songs including Aku Rindu Akan Tuhan (I Long for the Lord), Tuhan Bentengku (Lord My Fortress), Sungguhlah Indah Rumah-Mu (How Beautiful is Thou House), and Dikau Tuhan dan Kawanku (Praise to You, Lord). The day before, a concelebrated Mass was held at the Gelora Bung Karno Main Stadium and at the Madya Stadium to consecrate the host that was given to the people at this mass.

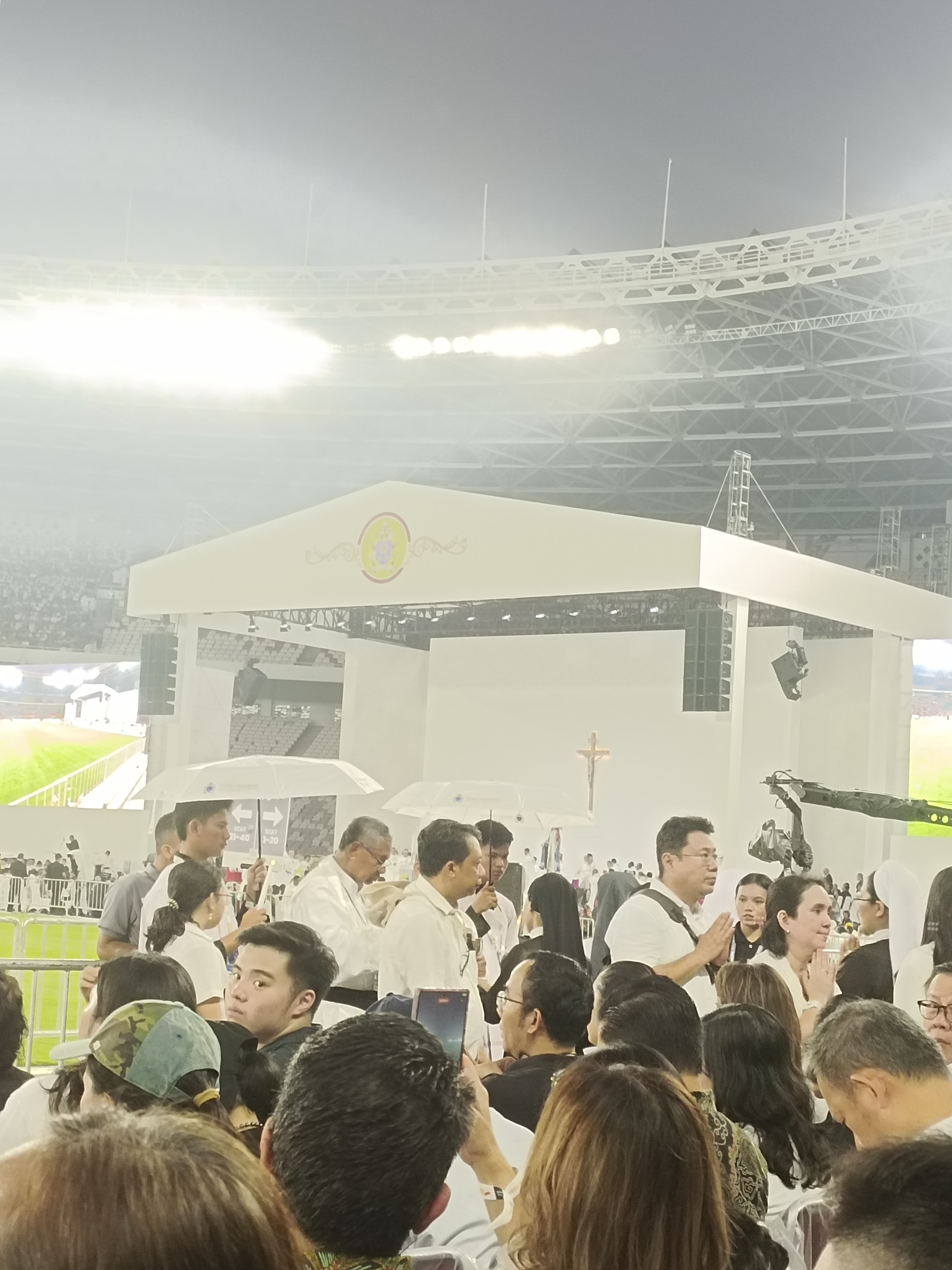
Receiving Communion at the Pope's Mass in Jakarta

At the end of the mass, Cardinal Suharyo gave a speech and Pope Francis then gave a short speech. The Pope emphasised the words ‘fate chiasso’ which can be interpreted contextually as an invitation to proclaim the Gospel with zeal and courage. Pope Francis then gave his blessing at the end of the Mass in Latin. He then prayed in front of the statue of Mary, Mother of All Tribes, as the congregation sang the Marian Antiphon, Salve Regina. Previously, the congregation had also been encouraged to sing Salve Regina at the end of the Eucharistic celebrations ahead of the Pope's presence. The choir, led by conductor R.P. Constantius Eko Wahyu Djoko Santoso, O.S.C. with organist R.P. Harry Singkoh, M.S.C., performed a number of closing songs such as Jadilah Saksi Kristus (Be Witnesses of Christ) and Nafas Iman (Breath of Faith) that accompanied the procession out.

=== After mass activities ===
Singer Lyodra Ginting returned to perform a song, The Prayer, in collaboration with Prihartono ‘Anton’ Mirzaputra who is the vocalist of Jamaica Cafe. Lyodra again collaborated with a number of priests to perform the song Doa Kami which was popularised by JPCC Worship and created by Sari Simorangkir. A number of nuns performed the song I Will Follow Him. The congregation then began to leave the Gelora Bung Karno Complex after Pope Francis left the location.

== Departure to Papua New Guinea ==
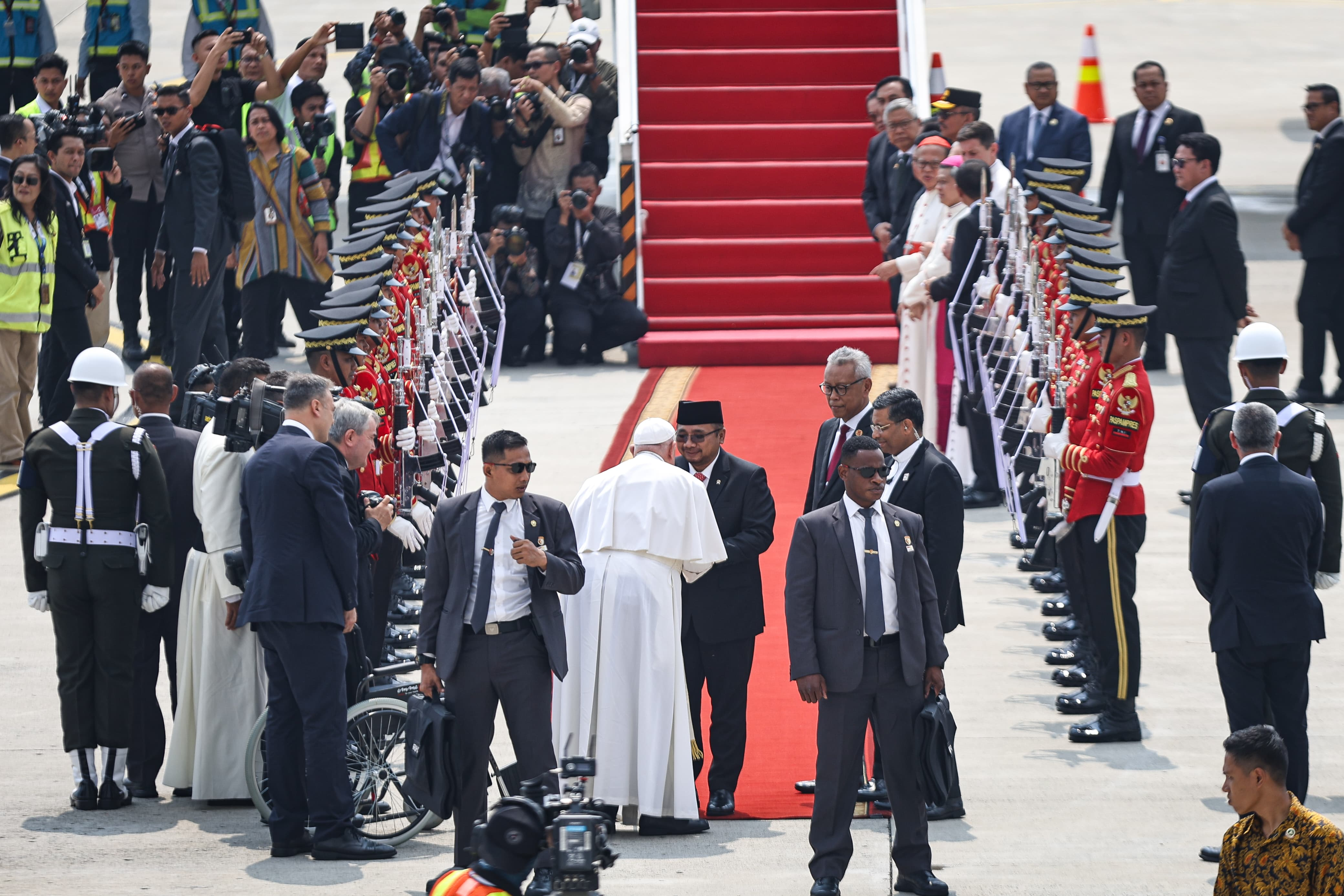
Pope Francis left Jakarta and flew to Port Moresby, Papua New Guinea.

On the morning of Friday 6 September 2024, Pope Francis departed for Papua New Guinea to continue his apostolic visit. He travelled from the Embassy of the Holy See to Soekarno-Hatta International Airport. He travelled by a commercial Garuda Indonesia flight to Port Moresby International Airport, located in Papua New Guinea's capital city of Port Moresby. The flight used an Airbus A330-900 neo aircraft (PK-GHE) with flight code GA 7780. Upon arrival at Soekarno-Hatta Airport, the Pope was welcomed by Minister of Religious Affairs, Yaqut Cholil Qoumas, Member of the Presidential Advisory Council, Gandi Sulistiyanto, and Indonesian Ambassador to the Holy See Michael Trias Kuncahyono one last time. As well as Garuda Indonesia President Director Irfan Setiaputra, and Chairman of the Visit Committee, Ignasius Jonan. Jakarta Archbishop Ignatius Cardinal Soeharyo and Bandung Bishop and KWI Chairman Antonius Subianto Bunjamin, O.S.C., along with the Apostolic Nuncio to Indonesia, Piero Pioppo were also present to escort the Holy Father. Pope Francis took the time to greet and bless a number of officials at Soekarno-Hatta Airport before boarding the plane. The flight took off at around 10.30 a.m. (UTC+07:00) and arrived in Papua New Guinea at 19.08 UTC+10:00 after travelling more than 4,500 kilometres. On the flight, Pope Francis chose a menu of Indonesian fried rice to be served on the flight.

== Security ==
During Pope Francis's visit to Indonesia, the Indonesian National Police deployed a total of 4,520 personnel to ensure order and security. This force includes 1,077 personnel from the National Police Headquarters and 3,443 personnel from the Jakarta Metro Police. The security operation, named Operation Tribrata Jaya 2024, was scheduled to last for six days, from 2 September to 7 September 2024.

=== Assassination plot ===
From the period of 2‒3 September 2024, Indonesian National police under Detachment 88, thwarted a plot by ISIS-linked terrorists to assassinate Pope Francis during his visit to Jakarta. Until 5 September, Detachment 88 initiated raids across various locations including Bangka Belitung, West Sumatra, West Java, and the vicinity of the Jakarta Metropolitan Area. Some were found with weapons such as bows and arrows, drones, and ISIS leaflets, even flags and logos. At the end of the operation, about 7 militants were arrested. The militants were reportedly angered by the Pope’s visit to Jakarta’s Istiqlal Mosque and the government’s request for TV stations to temporarily to broadcast the Pope's visit for Catholic Indonesians over the Islamic call to prayer at Magrib during his visit. Detachment 88 initially caught notice of the militants after observing the suspects spread Islamic radical propaganda, committing to shootings at the Merdeka Palace, and bomb threats over the pope's visit in social media, even to suggesting to burn the places visited by the Pope. Some were unaffiliated with each other, and some shared ISIS related imagery. Detachment 88 immediately took preventative action as mandated by Law Number 5 of 2018 concerning handling or countering terrorism. The police later advised Indonesians to filter information and be wise in social media. Investigation is ongoing over the assassination plot.

== See also ==
- Catholic Church in Indonesia
- List of pastoral visits of Pope Francis
