= Saris (disambiguation) =

Saris can refer to:

- Saris, gender identity in Talmudic Jewish tradition
- Saris, former Palestinian Arab village in Israel
- Šariš, Region in northeastern Slovakia
- Veľký Šariš, eastern Slovakia
- Šariš, a beer from Šariš Brewery, largest brewery in Slovakia
- Saris, Western Finland, village in Finland
- Saris (surname)
- the plural of Sari (Indian female costume)

== See also ==
- Sari (disambiguation)
