= Saris (surname) =

Saris is a surname. Notable people with this surname include:

- Angeline Saris of American hard rock tribute band Zepparella
- Frans W. Saris (born 1942), Dutch physicist, former director of ECN Petten, and former professor of physics and dean of mathematics and natural Sciences at the University of Leiden
- Ilse Saris (born 1975), Dutch politician
- Ivar Saris (born 1993), Dutch professional pool player
- John Saris (c. 1580 – 1643), chief merchant on the first English voyage to Japan
- Mari Saris (born 1958), Dutch professional ice hockey player
- Patti B. Saris (born 1951), Chief United States District Judge
- Willem Saris (born 1943), Dutch sociologist

== See also ==
- Sari (disambiguation)#Surname
