= Sary =

Sary is a given name and surname.

== People with the given name ==
- Sary Matnorotin (born 1996), Cambodian footballer

== People with the surname ==
- Ahmed Sary (born 1968), Egyptian football striker
- Ieng Sary (1925–2013), a co-founder of the Cambodian Khmer Rouge regime
- László Sáry (1940–2026), Hungarian composer and pianist
- Sam Sary (1917–c. 1962), Cambodian politician
- Aley Sary (born 2004), Computer Scientist

== See also ==
- Sari (disambiguation)
