= Nili Brosh =

Israeli-American guitarist

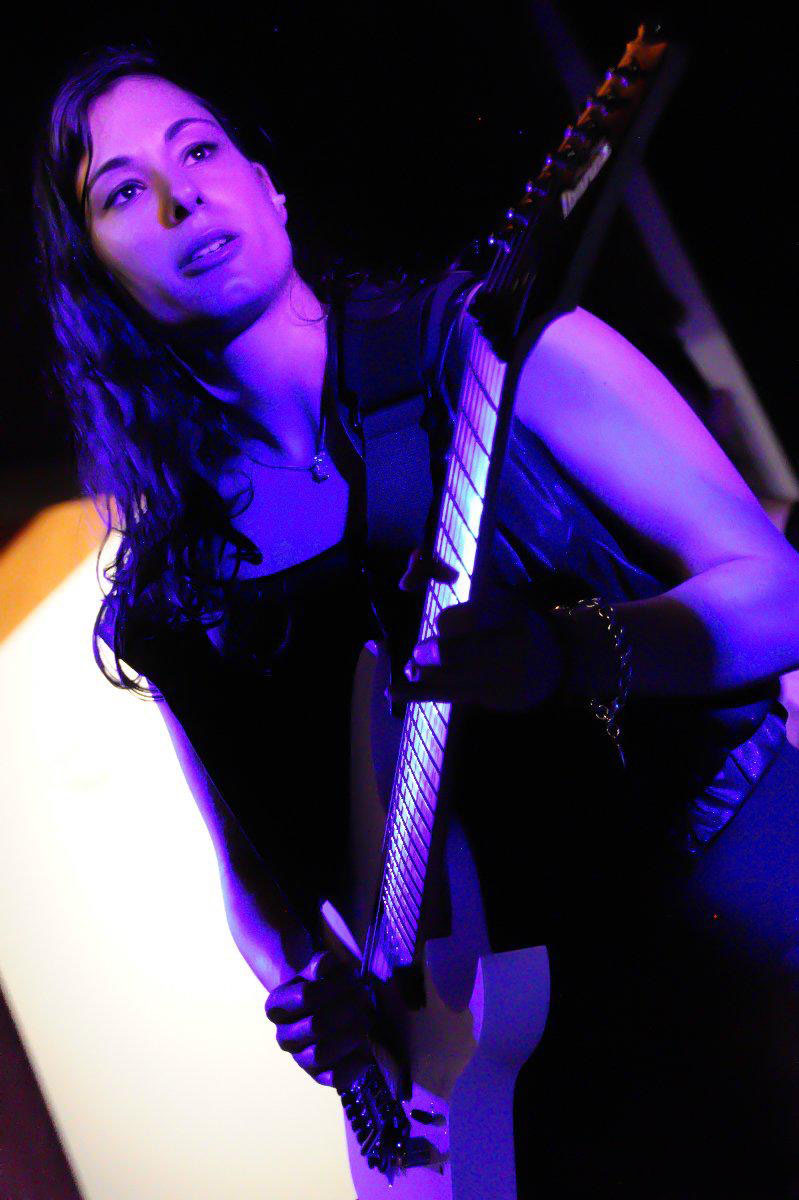

Background information
- Born: August 13, 1988 (age 38); Rishon LeZion, Israel
- Genres: Instrumental rock; heavy metal; hard rock
- Occupations: Musician, songwriter
- Instrument: Guitar
- Years active: 2009–present
- Website: nilibrosh.com

Nili Brosh is an Israeli guitarist known for having performed and/or recorded with Danny Elfman, Cirque du Soleil, Steve Vai,Andy Timmons, Guthrie Govan, DragonForce, and The Iron Maidens.

== Early life ==
Brosh was born in Rishon LeZion, Israel, the fourth child and only daughter of first-generation Israeli parents. Inspired by her brother, Ethan Brosh, Brosh started taking classical guitar lessons at the age of 7, later discovering the band Extreme and moving onto electric guitar at the age of 12. That same year, Brosh's family moved to Boston, MA, where she eventually went to Berklee College of Music.

== Career ==
Brosh graduated from Berklee College of Music in 2009, and immediately began teaching in the college's summer guitar programs. The following year she released her debut album, Through The Looking Glass, featuring a guest solo by Andy Timmons. Also in 2010, she started performing with The Iron Maidens, as well as making guest appearances with Stu Hamm, Andy Timmons, and The Aristocrats.

=== With Tony MacAlpine ===
In 2011 Brosh began working with Tony MacAlpine. The following year, Brosh joined MacAlpine's touring solo band along with bassist Bjorn Englen and drummer Aquiles Priester. The MacAlpine band toured America and Europe, while Brosh continued working on her second album, A Matter of Perception.

In 2014 Brosh performed in MacAlpine's Concrete Gardens Live DVD at EMG Pickups TV, playing songs from MacAlpine's album Concrete Gardens along with drummer Aquiles Priester, bassist Pete Griffin, and guest soloist Jeff Loomis. She also joined the band for the same year's Maximum Security tour.

=== Sidewoman/solo career ===
In 2013, Brosh played rhythm guitar for her brother Ethan Brosh, opening on Yngwie Malmsteen's Spellbound tour. The following year, while continuing to play with Tony MacAlpine, Brosh released her second album, A Matter of Perception. The album features several rhythm section heavyweights such as drummers Virgil Donati, Marco Minnemann, and Aquiles Priester, and bassists Stu Hamm and Bryan Beller. Throughout the next few years, Brosh focused on giving guitar clinics as well as performing her original music with her band (bassist Eli Marcus, guitarist Alon Mei-Tal, and drummer Ray Rojo), and writing a lesson column for Premier Guitar magazine. In 2017, Brosh joined bassist Alphonso Johnson's band, along with drummer Chester Thompson.

In 2019, Brosh prepared for the release of her new album Spectrum by giving an Ibanez clinic tour in Canada, and performing her music on tour dates with Batten-Menn-Brosh - a trio show she created with Jennifer Batten and Gretchen Menn. She also played on Beller's album Scenes From The Flood, on the track "World Class" alongside John Petrucci. Later on in the year, Brosh joined virtual melodic death metal band Dethklok for a performance at Adult Swim Festival in Los Angeles. Brosh continued to perform with Dethklok post-pandemic, including performances in 2022, 2023 co-headlining Babyklok tour with BABYMETAL, and 2024-2025 dates such as Mutilation on a Spring Night tour, Headbanger’s Boat, Mexico City MXMF fest, and Awaken Australia and Europe Tours.

Brosh released her music video and single "Primal Feels" on September 3, 2019, followed by the release of her third album, Spectrum, on December 20, 2019. She released the music video and single "Estranged", in August 2020, as well as singles "Song for Hope" and "Lavender Mountains" in May 2023.

Brosh participated in Joe Satriani's G4 v6 and John Petrucci's Guitar Universe 5.0, which took place in Las Vegas in January 2023 and August 2025, respectively. She toured her original material in Europe on the 2024 "Too Real to Fake" Tour. The same year she performed Barbie: The Movie at Hollywood Bowl, and also teamed up with The Newton Brothers to record guitars on the classic theme arranged for X-Men '97.

Brosh has endorsements with Ibanez Guitars, Mesa Amps, and EMG Pickups.

=== With Cirque du Soleil ===
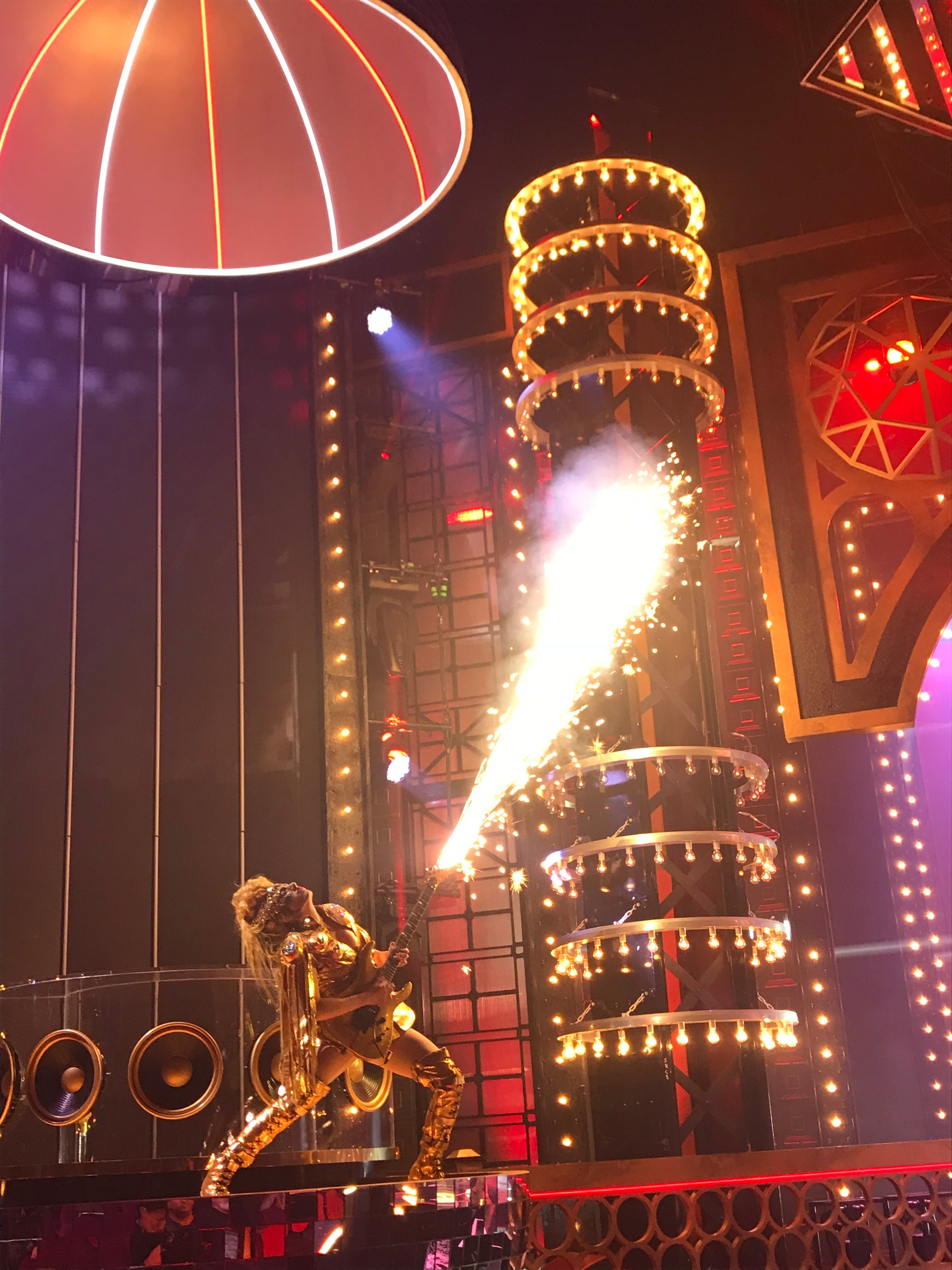
Brosh with Cirque du Soleil in 2018

In 2017, Brosh joined the cast of Cirque du Soleil's production "Michael Jackson ONE", a resident show in Mandalay Bay, Las Vegas. Playing a feature character entitled "The Muse", Brosh played the iconic guitar solos from Michael Jackson's music while shooting fire out of her guitar. She succeeded Gina Gleason in the role upon the latter joining Baroness. The show runs on a schedule of ten shows a week, which Brosh was a part of for the following two years. While with Cirque, she also performed at the Life is Beautiful festival in Las Vegas, Paramount Network's TV show Lip Sync Battle, as well as the national anthem for the Vegas Golden Knights. She left the roster in March 2019, and returned in 2022 as part-time Muse.

=== With Danny Elfman ===
In 2020, Brosh joined Danny Elfman's band with the intention of performing at Coachella 2020, which was cancelled due to the COVID pandemic. Subsequently, she recorded guitars on Elfman's 2021 and 2022 releases Big Mess and Bigger. Messier. (featuring remixes by Trent Reznor, Iggy Pop, and others), and performed with Elfman at his famed 2022 Coachella and Hollywood Bowl performances. In 2023-2025, Brosh performed with Elfman on additional 'From Boingo, to Batman, to Big Mess, and Beyond' California dates, as well as the Nightmare Before Christmas shows at the Hollywood Bowl.

== Discography ==
Studio albums

- Through the Looking Glass (2010)
- A Matter of Perception (2014)
- Spectrum (2019)
- Eventide (2026)

=== Through the Looking Glass ===
All music is composed by Nili Brosh.

All Tracks
No.	Title	Length
1.	"The House of Tomorrow"	2:10
2.	"Lost in Suburbia"	4:59
3.	"Hat Tricks"	6:03
4.	"High Strung"	5:05
5.	"Through the Looking Glass"	5:32
6.	"Placebo"	4:23
7.	"Wafer"	5:08
8.	"Never Be Enough"	4:35
9.	"Typsy Gypsy"	4:54

=== A Matter of Perception ===
All music is composed by Nili Brosh, except where noted.

All Tracks
No.	Title	Length
1.	"A Matter of Perception"
2.	"The Spring Tune"
3.	"Double Entendre"
4.	"Exit Strategy"
5.	"Silence of Saturday"
6.	"The Chase"
7.	"Eli"
8.	"Adaptable Creatures"
9.	"Alien Hip Hop" (Virgil Donati, arranged for guitar by Nili Brosh)
10.	"Yolanda"

=== Spectrum ===
All music is composed by Nili Brosh.

All Tracks
No.	Title	Length
1.	"Cartagena"	2:07
2.	"Andalusian Fantasy"	4:45
3.	"Circus Wedding"	3:07
4.	"Rachel in Paris"	3:24
5.	"Solace"	6:23
6.	"Retractable Intent"	4:14
7.	"Desert Deja Vu"	5:47
8.	"Djentrification"	5:06
9.	"Primal Feels"	4:46
10.	"Resistance Piece"	4:58

=== Singles ===
- 1. "Estranged" - 2020
- 2. "Song for Hope" - 2023
- 3. "Lavender Mountains" - 2023

Guest Appearances

- 2014: Aquiles Priester, Gustavo Carmo - Our Lives, 13 Years Later (guitar solo on "The Bucket is Full)
- 2017: Jay Matharu - These Clouds Are So Undisciplined! (guitar solo on "Breathe In, Breathe Out")
- 2019: Bryan Beller - Scenes From The Flood (melodies on "World Class")
- 2021: Waldheim Official Cinematic - Magic: The Gathering
- 2021: Danny Elfman - Big Mess
- 2022: Danny Elfman - Bigger. Messier.
- 2022: Jan Rivera - Existential Paranoia (on "The Encounter")
- 2023: Steph Goyer - Painted Sky (guitar solo on "Painted Sky")
- 2024: The Newton Brothers - X-Men '97 Theme
- 2024: Bear McCreary - The Singularity (guitar solo on "Rage Child")

Compilation albums

- 2017: She Rocks, Vol. 1 - "A Matter of Perception"

Video Albums

- 2015: Tony MacAlpine - Concrete Gardens - Live at EMGtv

== See also ==
- The Iron Maidens
- Dethklok
- Cirque du Soleil
- Tony MacAlpine
- Danny Elfman
