= She Rocks, Vol. 1 =

2017 compilation album featuring female rock guitarists

Compilation album by Various artists
- Released: January 20, 2017
- Genre: Rock
- Length: 55:10
- Label: Favored Nations

She Rocks, Vol. 1: A Collection of Kick-Ass Guitar Goddesses is a 2017 compilation album featuring female rock guitarists, released by Favored Nations Entertainment on January 20, 2017. The album was produced by Brad Tolinski and Steve Vai. The cover art was designed by Laura B. Whitmore.

== Track listing ==
1. Orianthi – "Transmogrify"
2. Yasi Hofer – "Cosmic Stars"
3. Kat Dyson – "U Know What I Like"
4. Sarah Longfield – "The Taxi Time Travel Task Force"
5. Lita Ford w/ Lez Zeppelin – "The Lemon Song"
6. Jennifer Batten – "In the Aftermath"
7. Nita Strauss – "Pandemonium"
8. Steph Paynes – "The Sun at Her Eastern Gate"
9. Nili Brosh – "A Matter of Perception"
10. Gretchen Menn – "Scrap Metal"
11. Yvette Young – "Hydra"

== See also ==
- Women in rock
