= Sari (disambiguation) =

A sari is a female garment in the Indian subcontinent.

Sari may also refer to:

== Places ==
- Sari, Iran, provincial capital of Mazandaran
  - Sari County, a county in Mazandaran
- Sari, Ardabil, a village in Ardabil Province, Iran
- Sari Kuchakeh, a village in Lorestan Province, Iran
- Sari Miri, a village in Lorestan Province, Iran
- Kalateh-ye Sari, a village in South Khorasan Province, Iran
- Sari, Zanjan, a village in Zanjan Province, Iran
- Sari, Nepal, a V.D.C. and town in Pyuthan district, Nepal
- Nav Sari, city in Gujarat, India

== People ==
=== Surname ===
- Abdelhaq Sari, Canadian politician
- Georges Sari (1925 – 2012), Greek author and actress
- Laila Sari (1935 – 2017), Indonesian comedian and singer
- Morad Sari (born 1973), French-Algerian kickboxer
- Riri Fitri Sari (born 1970), Indonesian computer engineer and academic
- Sirkka Sari (1920 – 1939), Finnish actress
- Sarı, a Turkish surname

=== Given name ===
- Sari Essayah (born 1967), Finnish race walker and politician
- Sari Furuya (born 1990), Japanese biathlete
- Sari Grönholm (1980), Finnish snowboarder
- Sari Kaasinen, Finnish musician, co-founder of the folk-music band Värttinä
- Sari Laine (born 1962), Finnish karateka
- Sari Lennick (born 1975), American actress
- Sari Simorangkir (born 1975), Indonesian contemporary Christian singer and songwriter
- Sari van Veenendaal (born 1990), a Dutch footballer
- Zsa Zsa Gabor (1917 – 2016), born Sári Gábor, Hungarian-American actress
- Sari, a Hebrew variety of the female given name Sarah

== Acronyms and abbreviations ==
- Serotonin antagonist and reuptake inhibitor (SARI), a class of pharmaceuticals used as antidepressants
- Severe Acute Respiratory Infection (SARI) or influenza-like illness, a medical diagnosis
- Simplified Airway Risk Index (SARI), a risk score for predicting difficult tracheal intubation
- Cataratas del Iguazú International Airport (ICAO code: SARI)
- Scientists for Accurate Radiation Information, a pro-nuclear-power organization

== Other ==
- Sari (operetta) or Der Zigeunerprimas, an operetta by Emmerich Kálmán
- Sari temple, an 8th-century Buddhist temple in Yogyakarta, Indonesia
- Sari Sumdac, a fictional character in the TV series Transformers: Animated

== See also ==
- 5ARI or 5α-Reductase inhibitor, a type of antiandrogen drug
- Sari-sari store, a type of convenience store in the Philippines
- Saari (disambiguation)
