= Sarı =

Sarı (IPA: [ˈsaɾɯ]) is the Turkish word for "yellow" or "blond". It may refer to:

== Surname ==
- Adem Sarı (born 1985), Turkish footballer
- Ali Sarı (born 1986), Turkish taekwondo practitioner
- Hasan Ahmet Sarı (born 1992), Turkish footballer
- Hızır Sarı (born 1951), Turkish sports wrestler
- Veysel Sarı (born 1988), Turkish footballer
- Yunus Sarı (born 1991), Turkish martial artist
- Yusuf Sari (born 1998), Turkish footballer

== Nickname ==
- Sari Saltik (died 1297/1298), semi-legendary Turkish dervish
- Sarı Süleyman Pasha (died 1687), Ottoman statesman of Bosnian origin

== Other uses ==
- Battle of Sari Bair (1915), final battle of the Gallipoli campaign
- Sari Gelin, the name for a number of folk songs

== See also ==
- Sari (disambiguation)
