= Saari =

Saari may refer to

- Saari (name)
- Saari, Finland, a former municipality
- Saari, Estonia, a village
- Saari or Tsari, a place near Skardu now in Gilgit-Baltistan, Pakistan; site of the 1948 Action at Tsari during the Indo-Pakistani war of 1947–1948
- Saari language in Cameroon
- Tarujen Saari, a Finnish folk-rock group

== See also ==
- Sari (disambiguation)
