= Sarah Longfield =

American musician and YouTuber

- Education: Minneapolis College of Art and Design
- Occupations: Musician; internet personality
- Years active: 2007–present
- Musical career
- Genres: Heavy metal; alternative metal; progressive metal; instrumental rock
- Instruments: Guitar; drums; vocals; synthesizer; ukulele
- Label: Season of Mist

YouTube information
- Channel: SarahLongfield
- Genres: Vlog; music
- Subscribers: 249 thousand
- Views: 20.4 million
- Last updated: November 9, 2025
- Website: www.sarahlongfield.art

Sarah Longfield is an American YouTuber, musician, and multi-instrumentalist based in Madison, Wisconsin. She is known for her two-handed tapping style of playing and the use of an eight-string guitar.

== Career ==
Longfield started her YouTube channel in 2007. She gained popularity after collaborating with Rob Scallon on a series of metal covers performed on ukulele. In 2012, she formed her band, The Fine Constant, with whom she has released two albums. The band performs with Longfield on her solo tours. They have toured with acts such as Marty Friedman, Angel Vivaldi, and Polyphia.

In 2017, Longfield contributed a track to She Rocks, Vol. 1, a compilation released by the record label Favored Nations. In 2018, she signed with label Season of Mist and released the album Disparity. She produced the album herself. The label also reissued her prior album, Collapse // Expand.

Longfield was named on a list of "15 of the World's Greatest Seven- and Eight-String Guitarists" by Guitar World in 2018. In 2019, her signature series guitar was developed by Strandberg Guitars.

In 2021, Longfield joined John 5 on tour. She went on a hiatus to pursue a college degree, completing her Furniture Design program at Minneapolis College of Art and Design. In November 2023, Longfield and Eric Collier released the single Glimpse of the Finale as Chrome Coda. In 2024, she was working on a new solo album.

== Discography ==
Studio albums

- Myriad (2012) – as The Fine Constant
- Woven in Light (2015) – as The Fine Constant
- Collapse // Expand (2017)
- Disparity (2018)

Extended plays

- Zeal (2011)
- Par Avion (2012)
- Oneiric EP (2013)
- Kikiria (2014)
- Velvet Nectar (2016)
- Dusk (2020)

Collaborations

- She Rocks, Vol. 1 (2017) – Various artists
