= Gretchen Menn =

American guitarist and composer

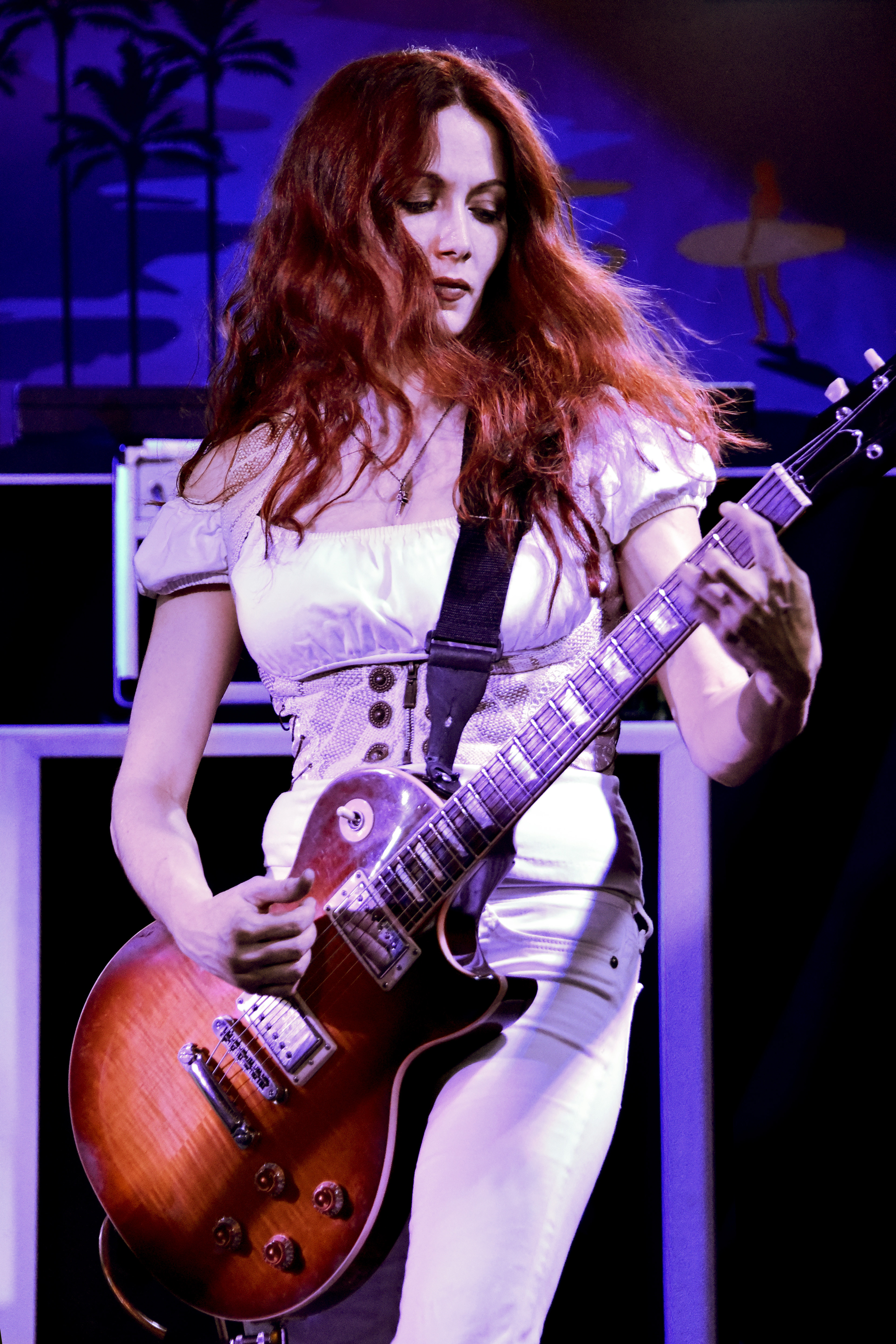
- Gretchen Menn performing with Zepparella at the Malibu Guitar Festival 2017

Background information
- Born: Gretchen Menn
- Genres: Rock, progressive, instrumental
- Instruments: Electric and acoustic Guitar
- Website: www.gretchenmenn.com

Gretchen Menn is an American guitarist and composer who has her own original instrumental work and is also the lead guitarist for Zepparella, an all-female Led Zeppelin tribute band. She was included in Guitar Player Magazine's '50 Sensational Female Guitarists' and Guitar Player Magazine's '50 Years of Extraordinary Players.' In 2017 she was one of 11 female guitarists selected to contribute a track onto She Rocks, Vol. 1, a compilation released on Steve Vai’s label: 'Favored Nations'. In 2017 she was nominated by readers of Vintage Guitar Magazine as 'Artist of the Year', alongside Allan Holdsworth, Steve Vai, Dan Auerbach, Rik Emmett, and Andy Timmons. She has provided lessons for Acoustic Guitar Magazine, JamPlay - an online guitar lesson provider, and has been a 3-time counselor at Rock and Roll Fantasy Camps.

== Biography and early playing ==
Menn started playing guitar as a teenager. She attended Smith College, earning a Bachelor of Arts degree in music while studying classical guitar with Phillip de Fremery.

== Zepparella ==
Menn is an original member of Zepparella, a Led Zeppelin tribute band founded in 2004 which currently performs nationwide.

== Solo career ==
Menn's first solo album Hale Souls was released in July 2011. Her second solo album, Abandon All Hope, was released in December 2016.

== Discography ==
=== Solo ===
- Abandon All Hope (2016)
- Hale Souls (2011)

=== Zepparella ===
- Live at Sweetwater (2016)
- Zepparella (2014)
- A Pleasing Pounding (2008)
- Live at 19 Broadway (2005)

=== Lapdance Armageddon ===
- Lapdance Armageddon (2010)

=== Francis Bakin ===
- Conversation with Francis Bakin (2009)

=== Sticks and Stones ===
- Unbreakable Strings (2007)

=== The House of More ===
- The House of More (2006)
