= Bhingri =

Bhingri भिंगृ, भिङ्ग्री
- Village Development Committee
- Location in Nepal
- Coordinates: 28.16°N 82.69°E
- Country: Nepal
- Region: Mid-Western
- Zone: Rapti Zone
- District: Pyuthan District
- VDC: Bhingri

Population (2001 Census)
  - Total: 4,209
- 907 households
- Time zone: UTC+5:45 (Nepal Time)

Bhingri is a Village Development Committee in Pyuthan, a Middle Hills district of Rapti Zone, western Nepal.

== Villages in VDC ==
		Ward	Lat.	Lon	Elev.
Barhamure	बाह्रमुरे		28°09'N	82°40'E	1,221m
Bartan	बर्तान		28°11'N	82°39'E	1,370
Bhingrikot	भिङ्ग्रिकोट		28°08'N	82°42'E	1,205
Bhingrikot Apchaur	भिङ्ग्रिकोट आँपचौर	1	28°08'N	82°42'E	1,289
Dandakharka	डाँडाखर्क	6	28°08'N	82°40'E	1,490
Dhanchaur	धनचौर		28°10'N	82°42'E	695
Gabdhara	गाबधारा		28°11'N	82°40'E	850
Goganpani	गोगनपानी		28°08'N	82°41'E	1,485
Jaluki	जलुकी		28°09'N	82°43'E	630
Keshpur	केशपुर		28°11'N	82°41'E	1,125
Kimchaur	किमचौर	9	28°11'N	82°42'E	690
Kitdhara	किटधारा		28°10'N	82°40'E	1,170
Kunauta	कुनौटा		28°08'N	82°43'E	690
Laphe	लाफे		28°07'N	82°43'E	810
Lungsarkot	लुङसारकोट		28°10'N	82°41'E	950
Madanpur	मदनपुर	9	28°10'N	82°42'E	750
Mathillo Malarani	माथिल्लो मालारानी		28°10'N	82°40'E	1,550
Neware	नेवारे	8	28°11'N	82°40'E	1,192
Pallo Lungsarkot	पल्लो लुङसारकोट		28°11'N	82°41'E	1,051
Rakabang	राकाबाङ		28°08'N	82°41'E	1,285
Rumale	रुमाले		28°08'N	82°41'E	1,718
Sund	सुँड		28°09'N	82°43'E	690
Swargadwari	स्वर्गद्वारी		28°07'N	82°41'E	2,070
Tallo Bhingri	तल्लो भिङ्ग्री		28°09'N	82°43'E	690
Tamdhar	तामधार		28°09'N	82°40'E	1,245
Upallo Bhingri	उपल्लो भिङ्ग्री	3	28°09'N	82°42'E	750
