= Gothibang =

Gothibang गोठीबाङ
- Village Development Committee
- Location in Nepal
- Coordinates: 28.10°N 82.73°E
- Country: Nepal
- Region: Mid-Western
- Zone: Rapti Zone
- District: Pyuthan District
- VDC: Gothibang

Population (2001 Census)
  - Total: 4,190
- 798 households
- Time zone: UTC+5:45 (Nepal Time)

Gothibang is a town and Village Development Committee in Pyuthan, a Middle Hills district of Rapti Zone, western Nepal.

== Etymology ==
In Khamkura Gothi is a small, primitive mine. Bang means a field or pasture, high enough for the climate to be temperate, subalpine or even alpine.

== Villages in VDC ==
		Ward	Lat.	Lon	Elev.
Bajipur	बाजिपुर	6	28°08'N	82°44'E	715m
Chhedpakha	छेडपाखा		28°06'N	82°45'E	1,136
Danda Kateri	डाँडा कटेरी		28°06'N	82°43'E	1,190
Dandagaun	डाँडागाउँ	8	28°06'N	82°42'E	1,610
Dandathar	डाँडाथर		28°06'N	82°43'E	1,040
Dhapkholagaun	धापखोलागाउँ		28°05'N	82°43'E	1,490
Dharampa	धरमपा		28°05'N	82°43'E	1,730
Dibang	दिबाङ		28°06'N	82°46'E	730
Gadhi	गढी	3	28°06'N	82°45'E	1,150
Ghorkhandi	घोरखण्डी		28°07'N	82°42'E	1,710
Gothibang	गोठीबाङ		28°07'N	82°44'E	707
Judapata	जुडापाटा	2	28°07'N	82°45'E	630
Jugena	जुगेना		28°07'N	82°41'E	1,610
Laphe	लफे	7	28°07'N	82°43'E	1,350
Maurikholagaun	मौरीखोलागाउँ		28°06'N	82°42'E	1,230
Namrikot	नम्रीकोट		28°06'N	82°45'E	1,010
Patihalna	पातिहाल्ना		28°06'N	82°44'E	790
Punyadip	पुण्यदिप		28°05'N	82°44'E	1,310
Sikhre	सिख्रे		28°07'N	82°43'E	952
Simle	सिम्ले		28°07'N	82°43'E	1,450
