= Zepparella =

American tribute rock band

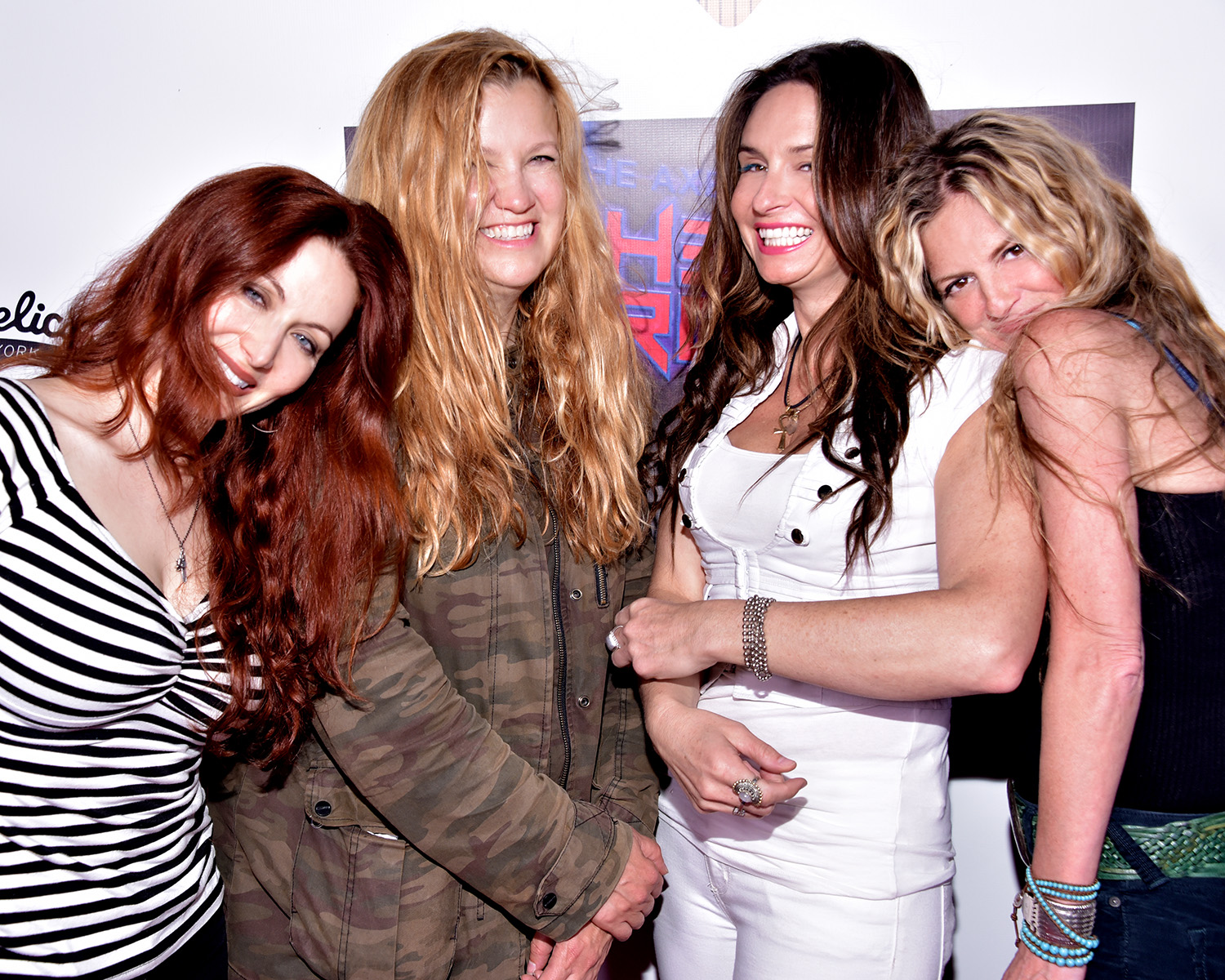
- Gretchen Menn, Clementine, Angeline Saris, and Noelle Doughty. 2017

Background information
- Origin: San Francisco, California, U.S.
- Genres: Hard rock; blues rock; folk rock
- Years active: 2004–present
- Labels: WhatAreRecords? (2008) Bonny Boy Records, (2005)
- Members: Clementine, drums; clemthegreat.com: Gretchen Menn, lead guitar; gretchenmenn.com: Holly West, bass guitar; hollywestmusic.com: Anna Kristina, vocals; annakristina.com
- Past members: Angeline Saris, bass guitar; angelinesaris.com: Noelle Doughty, vocals; facebook.com/noellephoenixryder: Nila Minnerok, bass player; Miaya Shambry, vocals; facebook.com/Miaya-Shambry
- Website: zepparella.com

Zepparella is an all-female American Led Zeppelin tribute band founded in 2005 in San Francisco, California by the band's drummer, Clementine. The current band consists of lead vocalist Anna Kristina, guitarist Gretchen Menn, bassist Holly West and drummer Clementine.

The original members were Anna Kristina, Gretchen Menn, Nila Minnerok and Clementine. In 2011, the lead singer was replaced by Miaya Shambry and the bass player by Angeline Saris; soon after the lead singer changed again and Noelle Doughty took the place. In 2017, Anna Kristina came back as lead singer and after some time Angeline Saris decided to leave the band. Holly West replaced her on bass guitar.

Zepparella released a self-titled 10-song studio album in 2014, and three live albums: Live at 19 Broadway in 2005, A Pleasing Pounding on WhatAreRecords? in 2010, and Live at Sweetwater in 2016.

The band has produced several videos. "When the Levee Breaks," was released in 2010 with over 20 million YouTube views; "Dazed and Confused," released in 2012, with over 1.8 million YouTube views; and "Kashmir," released in 2019, with over 1 million YouTube views.

Steve Vai performed with Zepparella at the Malibu Guitar Festival in Malibu, California on May 19, 2017.

== Equipment ==
Gretchen Menn - Lead Guitar: Music Man Silhouette and Silhouette Special; Sadowsky Nylon String Electric; DiMarzio Pickups, cables, straps; Bi-Onyx amp and cabinet; Engl Special Edition E 670 EL 34 1977 Marshall JMP amp; Two Rock half-stack; Providence guitar effects pedals

Clementine - Drummer: 1973 Ludwig kit, 24-20-18-14. Paiste Bonham reissue; Paiste 2002 cymbals; Ludwig SupraPhonic snare.

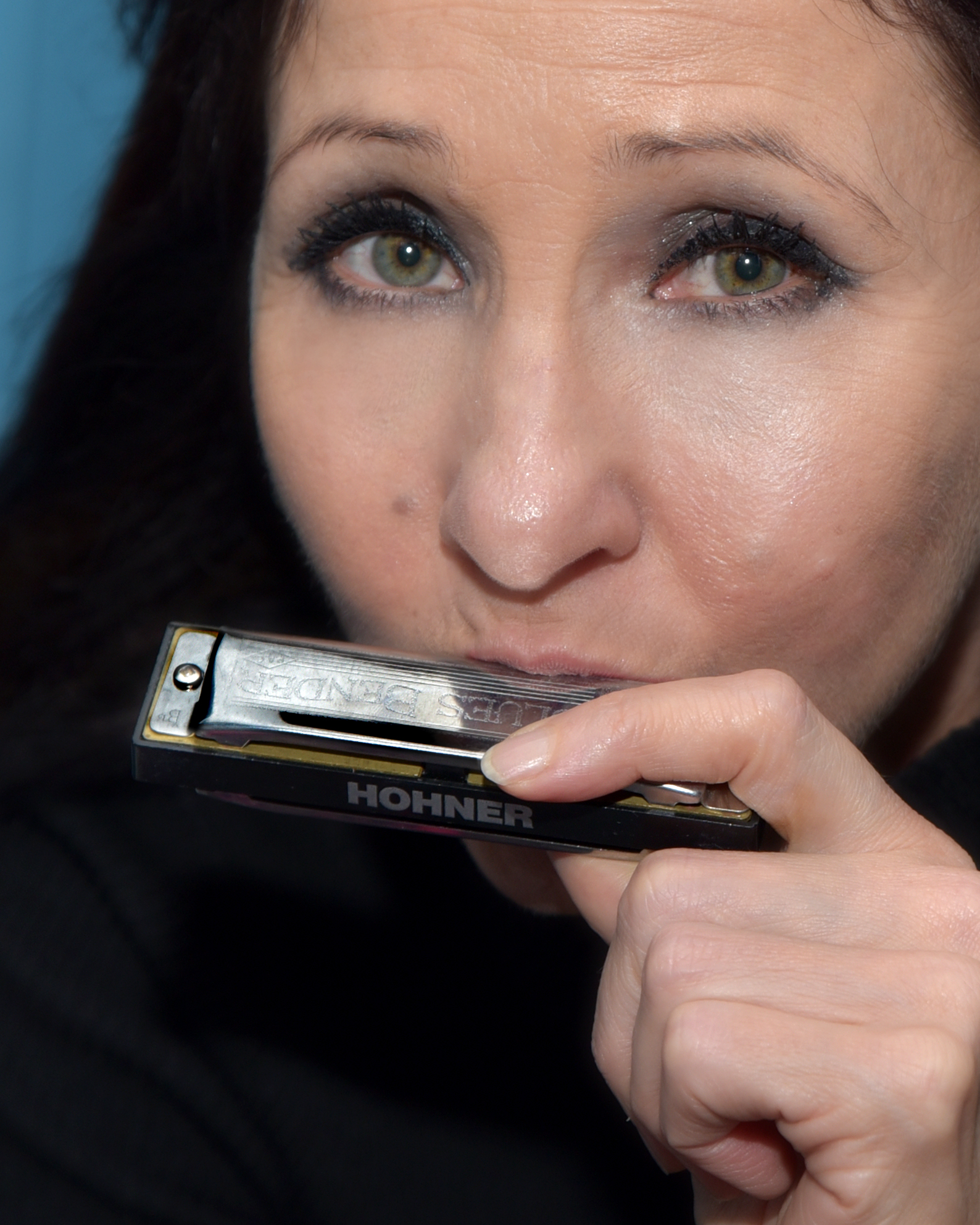
Anna Kristina

== Discography ==
- Live at 19 Broadway - live (2005)
- A Pleasing Pounding - live (2007/2010)
- Zepparella - a 10-song studio album (2014)
- Live at Sweetwater - live (2016)
- Zeppelin Forever - 9-track studio album (2025)
