= Belbas =

Belbas बेलबास
- Village Development Committee
- Location in Nepal
- Coordinates: 28.16°N 82.75°E
- Country: Nepal
- Region: Mid-Western
- Zone: Rapti Zone
- District: Pyuthan District
- VDC: Belbas

Population (2001 Census)
  - Total: 5,333
- 1,171 households
- Time zone: UTC+5:45 (Nepal Time)

Belbas is a Village Development Committee in Pyuthan, a Middle Hills district of Rapti Zone, western Nepal.

== Etymology ==
Bel (Nepali: बेल) - an edible fruit-producing tree species, sacred to Lord Shiva and central to a coming of age ceremony for Newar girls.
Bas (Nepali: बास) - resting place or camp.
Thus a resting place with Bel trees.

== Villages in VDC ==
| | | Ward | Lat. | Lon | Elev. |
|---|---|---|---|---|---|
| Basel Tol | बसेल टोल | | 28°09'N | 82°46'E | 1,050m |
| Belbas | बेलबस | 1 | 28°09'N | 82°45'E | 1,235 |
| Bhainsi Lote | भैंसी लोटे | | 28°11'N | 82°45'E | 1,650 |
| Chheda | छेडा | | 28°11'N | 82°45'E | 1,625 |
| Dahachaur | दहचौर | | 28°08'N | 82°44'E | 650 |
| Darenta | दरेन्टा | | 28°10'N | 82°47'E | 1,425 |
| Deurali | देउराली | | 28°10'N | 82°47'E | 1,857 |
| Dhandhara | धानधारा | | 28°10'N | 82°47'E | 1,318 |
| Ghustung | घुस्टुङ | | 28°08'N | 82°44'E | 628 |
| Gurumpa | गुरुम्पा | | 28°09'N | 82°46'E | 1,470 |
| Jhupakot | झुपाकोट | | 28°10'N | 82°45'E | 1,745 |
| Kep | केप | | 28°10'N | 82°44'E | 1,138 |
| Khaireni | खैरेनी | | 28°08'N | 82°45'E | 770 |
| Nalsing | नलसिङ | | 28°09'N | 82°43'E | 712 |
| Nangja | नाङजा | | 28°10'N | 82°46'E | 1,405 |
| Nigala | नाङजा | | 28°09'N | 82°45'E | 1,210 |
| Ninyu | निन्यु | | 28°12'N | 82°44'E | 1,570 |
| Orla | ओर्ला | | 28°11'N | 82°44'E | 1,319 |
| Ranitar | रानीटार | | 28°09'N | 82°44'E | 710 |
| Salabang | सालाबाङ | | 28°10'N | 82°46'E | 1,610 |
| Sikhre | सिख्रे | | 28°10'N | 82°44'E | 1,128 |
| Sotre | सोत्रे | 5 | 28°09'N | 82°44'E | 689 |
| Tapa | तापा | 8 | 28°09'N | 82°43'E | 685 |
| Tapakot | तापाकोट | | 28°10'N | 82°44'E | 1,219 |
| Thapakharka | थापाखर्क | 2 | 28°10'N | 82°45'E | 1,570 |
| Timile | तिमिले | 1 | 28°09'N | 82°46'E | 1,310 |
