= Sari Miri =

Sari Miri ساري ميري
- Village
- Location within Iran
- Coordinates: 33°27′22″N 47°37′01″E
- Country: Iran
- Province: Lorestan
- County: Kuhdasht
- Bakhsh: Central
- Rural District: Kuhdasht-e Jonubi

Population (2006)
  - Total: 418
- Time zone: UTC+3:30 (IRST)
  - Summer (DST): UTC+4:30 (IRDT)

Sari Miri (Persian: ساري ميري, also Romanized as Sārī Mīrī; also known as Sarimiri) is a village in Kuhdasht-e Jonubi Rural District, in the Central District of Kuhdasht County, Lorestan Province, Iran. At the 2006 census, its population was 418, in 83 families.
