= Barjibang =

Barjibang बर्जिबाङ
- Village Development Committee
- Location in Nepal
- Coordinates: 28.13°N 82.77°E
- Country: Nepal
- Region: Mid-Western
- Province: Lumbini Province
- District: Pyuthan District
- VDC: Barjibang

Population (2001 Census)
  - Total: 1,975
- 392 households
- Time zone: UTC+5:45 (Nepal Time)

Barjibang is a village and Village Development Committee in Pyuthan, a Middle Hills district of Lumbini Province, western Nepal.

== Villages in VDC ==
		Ward	Lat.	Lon	Elev.
Barjibang	बर्जिबाङ	2	28°08'N	82°46'E	966m
Chalnetar	चाल्नेटार		28°07'N	82°45'E	650
Dahachaur	दहचौर	4	28°07'N	82°46'E	690
Damar	दमार		28°07'N	82°46'E	666
Dandagaun	डाँडागाउँ		28°08'N	82°47'E	1,210
Dhanchaur	धनचौर		28°08'N	82°46'E	1,005
Ghustung	घुस्तुङ		28°07'N	82°46'E	590
Jhakeli	झकेली		28°08'N	82°46'E	870
Kamire	कमिरे		28°08'N	82°47'E	985
Maudhara	मौधारा		28°08'N	82°46'E	985
Pallo Maudhara	पल्लो मौधारा		28°08'N	82°45'E	910
Pedi	पेदी		28°08'N	82°46'E	910
Simenikholagaun	सिमेनीखोलागाउँ		28°09'N	82°47'E	1,501
Takura	टाकुरा		28°07'N	82°47'E	635
Thulchaur	ठूलचौर		28°09'N	82°47'E	1,530
AMILADHARA	अमिल्धारा	9	28°07'N	82°45'E	610
