= Satu Nusa Satu Bangsa =

Single by Liberty Manik (Writer)
- Genre: Anthem
- Songwriter: Liberty Manik

Satu Nusa Satu Bangsa (transl. One Native Land, One Nation) is an Indonesian national song created by Liberty Manik, and the song was first played via radio broadcasts in 1947.

== Lyrics and structure ==
Original

Satu nusa
Satu bangsa
Satu bahasa kita

Tanah air
Pasti jaya
Untuk s'lama-lamanya

Reff :
Indonesia pusaka
Indonesia tercinta
Nusa bangsa
Dan Bahasa
Kita bela bersama

Translation

One Native Land
One Nation
Our language is one

The Motherland
Will be Glorious
For Forever and ever

Reff :
The Sacred Indonesia
The Beloved Indonesia
Native land, nation
and language
We will support it together

"Satu Nusa Satu Bangsa" is performed andante moderato in 4/4 time.
