= Sari Simorangkir =

Indonesian musician

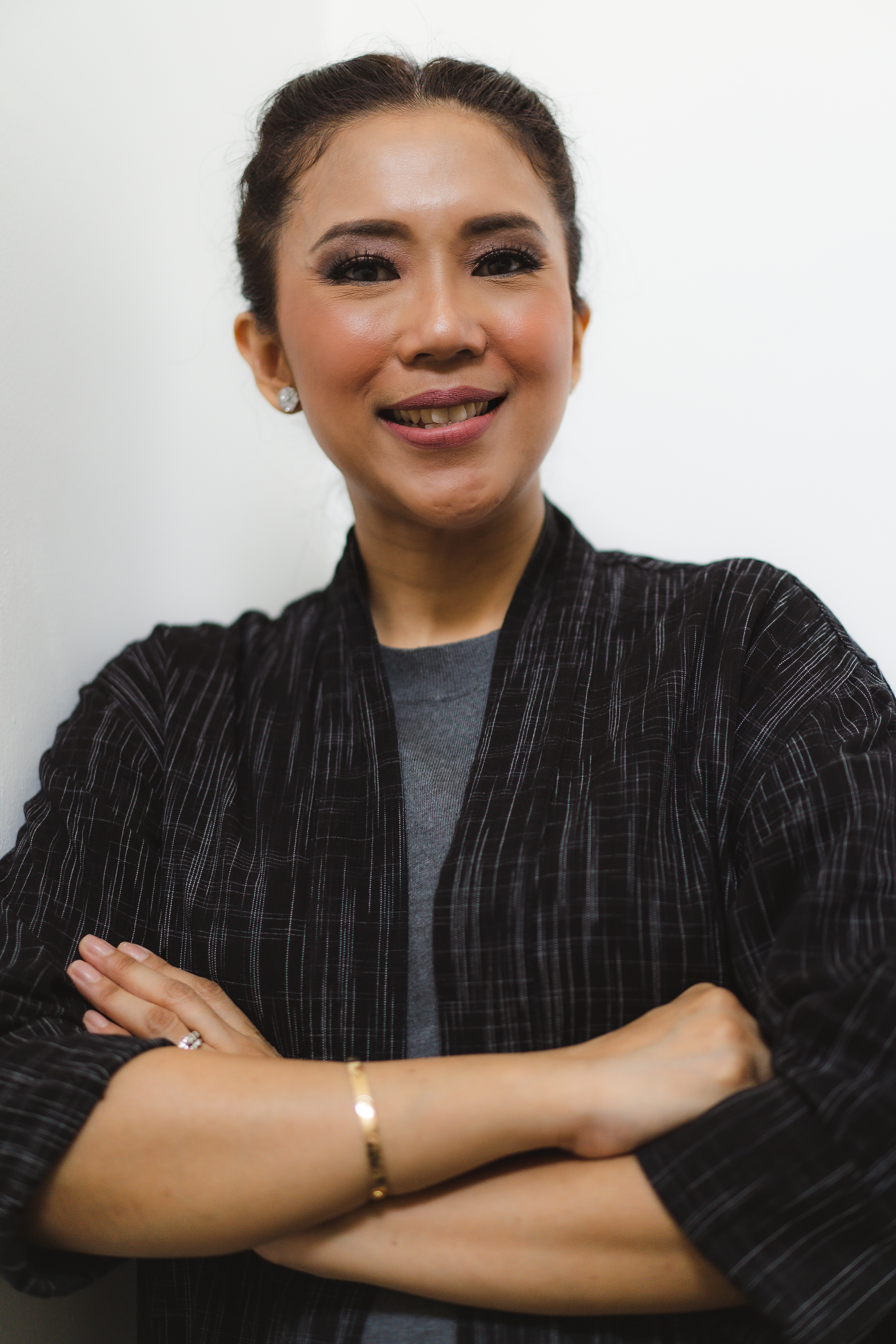

Background information
- Born: Sari Simorangkir; March 31, 1975 (age 51); Semarang, Indonesia
- Genres: Contemporary Christian, contemporary worship
- Occupation: Singer-songwriter
- Instrument: Vocals
- Years active: 1990–present
- Website: sarisimorangkir.com

Sari Simorangkir (born March 31, 1975) is an Indonesian contemporary Christian music singer and songwriter. She is commonly called "Sari". She is best known as one of the JPCC Worship was previously True Worshipers vocalists. Gifted with enormous singing talent, Sari has released many solo albums and many other records with various artists. Her songs have become anthems of worship in churches nationwide.

Sari has been influenced by Michael W. Smith, Crystal Lewis, Yolanda Adams, and secular singers such as Whitney Houston, Mariah Carey, Lydia Imaniar, and Sting. Even though she loves R&B, soul, and blues, Sari realizes that pop suits her best.

== Biography ==
=== Early life ===
Sari Simorangkir was born in Semarang to Batak parents D.N. Simorangkir and Tiur Ida Simanjuntak. As her father worked at Pertamina, Sari was raised in five different cities in Indonesia, including Semarang, Makassar, and finally Jakarta, where she finished her high school education. She has two siblings Fredrick and Sammy.

She began to sing in 1990 when she was in senior high school. She was encouraged by her parents to take part in singing contests such as Cipta Pesona Bintang and Asia Bagus. Though she did not win, she became very motivated to sing.

=== Voice of Generation ===
About two years later Sari and her colleagues created a music band named Ezra. In 1992 the name was changed to VOG, Voice of Galilea, before it changed again to Voice of Generation when they made their second album, Tutur kata. She was one of the band's vocalists, along with Viona Paays, Franky Sihombing (who also played bass guitar), and later Sydney Mohede, when he joined the group on the second album.

In the late 1980s, when the world of Christian spiritual music had not evolved to the point it is today, VOG wanted to make more contemporary alternative music for the younger generation of Christians. They made songs that contained positive messages and were universal, and so were liked by all circles. Their first two albums were Kusadari and Tutur Kata. Their songs appeared on "The Song Chart" of the radio stations in Jakarta.

The VOG formation of the first album, Kusadari, was:

- Franky Sihombing (bassist/vocalist)
- Erwin Badudu (keyboardist)
- Ucok Radjaguguk (keyboardist)
- Amos Cahyadi (drummer)
- Thomas B Handoyo (guitarist)
- Viona Paays (vocalist)
- Sari Simorangkir (vocalist)

The VOG formation of the second album, Tutur Kata, was:

- Franky Sihombing (bassist/vocalist)
- Ucok Radjaguguk (keyboardist)
- Amos Cahyadi (drummer)
- Thomas B Handoyo (guitarist)
- Viona Paays (vocalist)
- Sari Simorangkir (vocalist)
- Sidney Mohede (vocalist)

Their second album was the last before they disbanded. In October 2009, VOG held a reunion concert.

=== True Worshippers / JPCC Worship ===
In her community named JPCC (Jakarta Praise Community Church) (kind of God's servant community), Sari met acquaintances who would later be part of True Worshippers, such as Sidney Mohede, Ucok Radjaguguk, and Daniel Sigarlaki. She learned many things about singing and songwriting from this community. In 1996, they officially established True Worshippers with Mohede (her partner in VOG) as the founder. Sari made a major contribution as lead vocalist, along with Ruth Sahanaya and Sidney Mohede, to this group.

== Solo projects ==
Sari also has solo projects. The first and second albums weren't so successful due to their genre, R&B. Churches considered that R&B music was not suitable to be used as worship anthems in Indonesia. Sari decided to make the third album more in the pop style. The third and fourth albums successfully sold about 30.000 copies. Sari later knew that pop songs are the easiest to be sung by churches in Indonesia. She also knew that lyrics about human relationships are not considered anthems of worship in churches. Later, she tended to make songs about the relationship of God and people as His]servants.

As of 2013, she has produced 12 albums.

The title of her fifth album, 31:31, was inspired by her birthday (March 31), her age when she completed this album, and the completion date of this album production (March 31).

Her eighth album, Sari 8, was named in accordance with the order of the album.

=== Albums ===
- 1999: Besar setia-Mu
- 1999: Sari
- 2002: Memuji-Mu
- 2004: Touch
- 2005: 31:31
- 2007: Forever Grateful
- 2008: I Believe
- 2008: Sari 8
- 2009: Stronger
- 2011: Allegro
- 2011: the Creator
- 2013: Manifest
- 2015: Yang Terbaik
- 2016: Light Up Christmas
- 2017: Best of Sari
- 2018: SOVEREIGN
- 2019: TUHAN YANG BESAR (Sari Simorangkir album)

Notable songs include "Yang Terbaik", "Kaulah Segalanya", "Bagi Tuhan Tak Ada Yang Mustahil", "Karya Terbesar", "Dengan SayapMu", "Hati Hamba", "Hanya Kau Tuhan", "Aku Percaya", "Tidak Dengan Tangan Hampa" (medley Persembahanku), "Yesusku Dahsyat", and "Dengan Sayap-Mu".

== Awards and nominations ==
In 2005, Sari received three awards from Indonesian Gospel Music Award of Excellence 2005 for her works:

- "Karya terbesar" as Song of the Year
- Touch as Album of the Year
- Collaboration with Sammy Simorangkir as Duo or Group of the Year

== Personal life ==
In 1997, Sari and Handy Iskandar Sinaga were married. They have two children named Sharon and Sandy

Now Sari is busy with her ministry and taking care of her family. She looks forward to releasing more albums with her own style of music, bringing more flavors to Indonesian Christian music. She hopes to have a solo concert. "I hope to see myself in the next five years as a more mature and stronger person, continuing what I've been doing to bless people."
