= Sari, Nepal =

Sari सारी
- Village Development Committee
- Location in Nepal
- Coordinates: 28.19°N 82.71°E
- Country: Nepal
- Region: Mid-Western
- Province: Lumbini Province
- District: Pyuthan District
- VDC: Sari

Population (2001 Census)
  - Total: 3,590
- 727 households
- Time zone: UTC+5:45 (Nepal Time)

Sari is a town and Village Development Committee in Pyuthan, a Middle Hills district of Lumbini Province, western Nepal.

== Cities in this Ward ==
		Ward	Lat.	Lon	Elev.					
Dandagaun	डाँडागाउँ		28°12'N	82°43'E	1,310m					
Danphedhara	डाँफेधारा		28°12'N	82°42'E	1,190					
Gaekharka	गाएखर्क		28°11'N	82°44'E	990					
Jholgaun	झोलगाउँ		28°11'N	82°43'E	1,178					
Kholakhet	खोलाखेत		28°12'N	82°42'E	735					
Maubari	मौबारी		28°11'N	82°42'E	995					
Saunepani	साउनेपानी		28°12'N	82°44'E	1,690					
Sisneri	सिस्नेरी		28°12'N	82°44'E	1,850					
Syani lekh	स्यानी लेख	8	28°11'N	82°44'E	1,510					
Tahar Dhik	टाहार ढिक		28°11'N	82°42'E	745					
Takura	टाकुरा		28°10'N	82°43'E	785					
Talla Sari	तल्ला सारी		28°11'N	82°43'E	756	Talla Sari	तल्ला सारी	Tallo Tol (Pragati Tole)	28°10'23"N	82°42'15"E
Upalla sari	उपल्ला सारी		28°11'N	82°42'E	810					
