= Lausha =

Lausha लौसा
- Location within Nepal
- Coordinates: 27°40.2′N 83°17.2′E
- Country: Nepal
- Development Region: Western
- Province: Lumbini Province
- District: Rupandehi
- VDC: Gajedi
- Ward No.: 1
- Time zone: UTC+5:45 (Nepal Time)

Lausha (Nepali: लौसा) is a small village located in Gajedi VDC of Nepal, about one kilometer south of Mahendra Highway in the direction to Lumbini along Gautam Buddha Highway. Around 3000 inhabitants live in the village, the population is sparsely distributed. The village is surrounded by community forest from east and west. On the north side of this village Sainamaina resides, where people from this village go for shopping. The north part of this city is gate to reach other main cities such as Murgiya, Saljhandi, Tamnagar, Butwal etc. This small village is easily accessible from Butwal via Jeep, Micro-buses, Tempo, they are available every 10 minutes. Even from Basgadhi, a neighboring village, there are chances to get E-Rickshaw, Mayuri etc. to reach this village. The newly built road, is of good quality, will not be difficult to reach using private motorcycle, or even bicycles.

Although this village is not so well known in Nepal, the two popular and renowned lakes Lausha Taal and Gajedi Taal belong to this village. The village is getting more support from VDC for reconstruction of the area to make it more comfortable for tourists. The construction of the road along the village has already begun, the goal being to reach to Lumbini (just 18 kilometers south of Lausha). Lumbini, where Lord Buddha was born, is a holy place for Buddhists.
