= Siddhababa–Dovan rockfall =

Landslide in Nepal

Siddhababa–Dovan rockfall refers to a hazardous geological zone along the Siddhartha Highway in Palpa District, western Nepal, between the villages of Siddhababa and Dovan near Butwal. This stretch has repeatedly experienced rockfall and landslide events due to its steep slopes and complex geology.

== Geology and cause ==
This road section cuts through the Sivalik Hills, characterized by alternating layers of hard sandstone and softer mudstone. High-angle slopes (70°–85°), adverse discontinuities in the rock mass, coupled with heavy monsoon rains, seismic activity, and erosion, make the area prone to plane and wedge failures, debris flows, and gully erosion.

== Incidents ==
- August 2015: A bus swept away killing 3.
- January 2016: A person travelling in a Jeep was killed by a sudden rockfall.
- September 2017:Two persons died when a landslide buried a car and a truck.
- July 2018: Two people in a motorbike were killed.
- September 2019: a rockfall struck a jeep near Siddhababa, resulting in one fatality and injuring others.

== Mitigation efforts ==
Mitigation efforts by the Nepal Department of Roads, supported by international agencies, include:

- Construction of a 1126 m Siddhababa bypass tunnel to bypass the high-risk slope section.
- Installation of rock sheds and rockfall barriers: approximately 1,500 m² of rock shed constructed, with additional protections planned
- Structural protections based on academic rockfall modeling studies, including rockfall barriers, netting, sheds, and rock bolting

== See also ==
- Shrawan Danda landslide
