= Shrawan Danda =

Settlement in Butwal, Nepal

Shrawan Danda is a hill in the North-eastern part of Butwal city in Nepal. The hill is settled by about 10,000 residents. Geologically, the hill lies in the Siwalik region. The stability of the hill has been questioned by several researchers, however, the settlement has not been moved. The unstable zone of Shrawan Danda vulnerable to landslide has an area of about 1.5 km^{2}. The altitude of the landslide zone from 200 to 750m and is covered by thin vegetation. There are several tension cracks on the crown. The zone is considered highly risky against earthquake due to presence of Main Frontal Thrust and Main Boundary Thrust in the immediate vicinity.

== 1998 landslide ==
The torrential rainfall on mid August 1998, triggered a landslide on 29 August and 5 September 1998. One person was killed in the landslide and five people were injured in the Jyotinagar and Laxminagar area. In total about 60 houses were damaged. The loss in infrastructure was calculated to be about NPR 58 millions.

== 2021 landslide ==
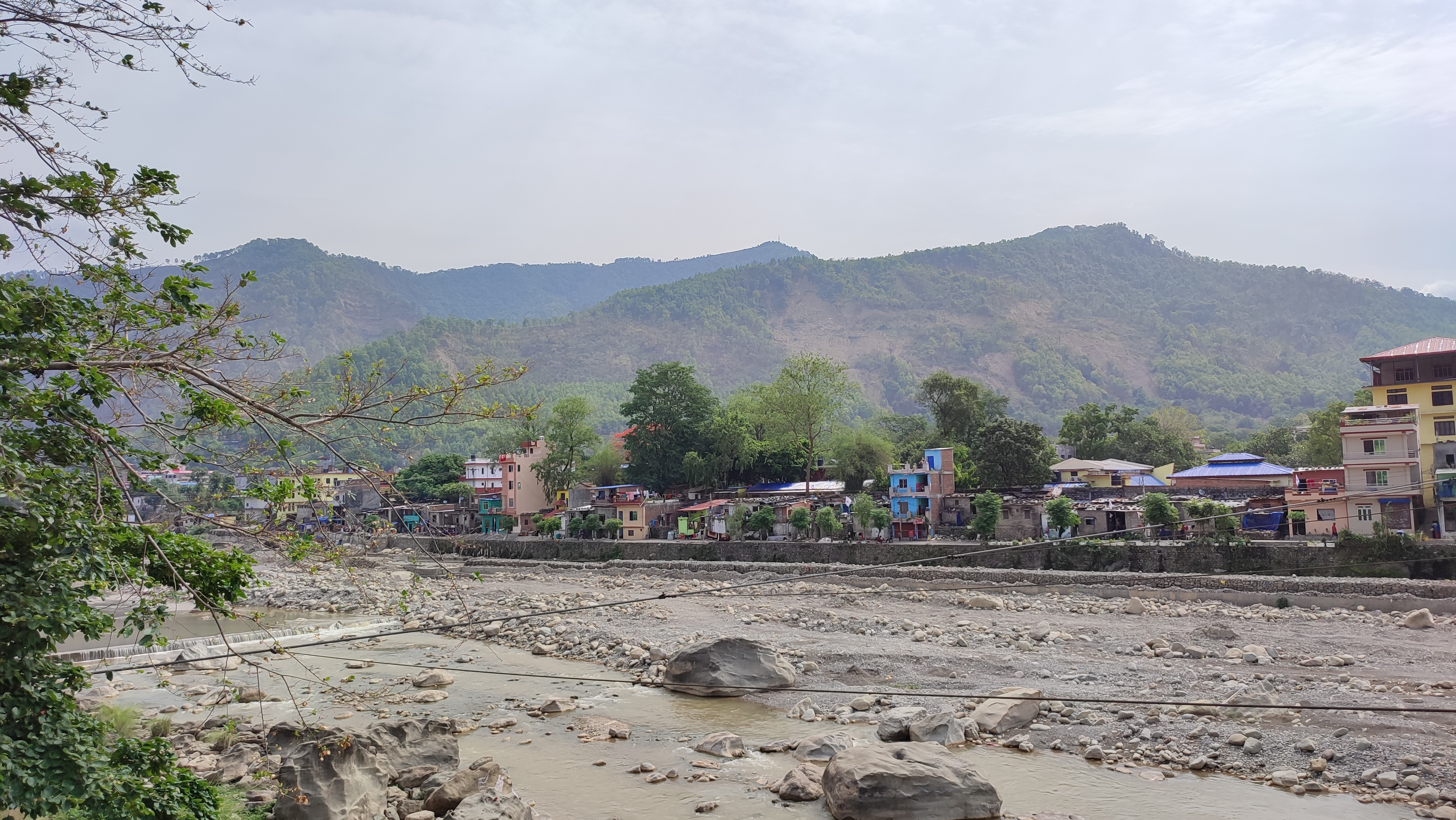
View of landslide from Tinau River

In August 2021 morning, landslide was triggered due to rainfall. About 11 houses were damaged by the landslide after it hit the settlement.

== See also ==
- Siddhababa–Dovan rockfall
