= Satyawati Temple =

Satyawati temple
- सत्यावती मन्दिर
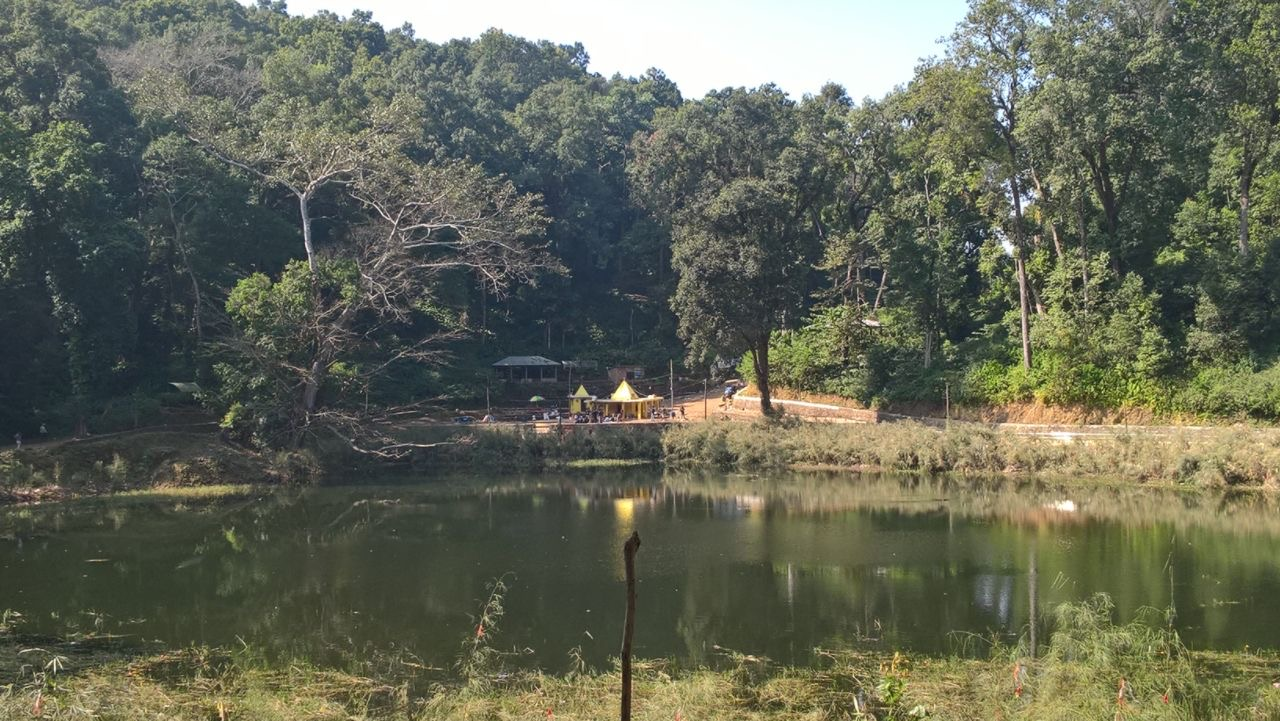

- Location in Nepal

Religion
- Affiliation: Hinduism
- District: Palpa
- Deity: Satyavati
- Festivals: Kartik Mela, Bala Chaturdasi

Location
- Location: Butwal
- Country: Nepal
- Interactive map of Satyawati temple
- Coordinates: 27.7598°N 83.5357°E

Satyawati temple (Nepali: सत्यावती मन्दिर) is located at Satyawati village of Palpa district in Nepal. The temple is located at an elevation of 1400 m near a sacred lake called Satawati Tal. The temple is dedicated to Magar community goddess Satyawati. There is another small lake nearby called Budhi Satyawati (बुढी सत्यावती). About 300,000 people from Nepal and India, mostly Hindus, visit the temple annually. The temple can be accessed though one of many foot trails; the main trail starts at the bridge of Jhumsa (Sisne River) in Siddhartha Highway, about 30-km south from Tansen and 19 km north of Butwal.

== Religious significance ==
Every year, a one night festival is held on the full moon day of (Kartik) October–November at Satyawati Lake, south of Tansen. According to the legend, on this night, the Goddess Satyawati fulfills the wishes of the pilgrims who circle the lake three times and shout out their wishes. People then take a holy bath in the lake and sacrifice animals and birds. People must shout their wishes because it is believed that the goddess is bad in hearing and the pilgrimages must shout to make her hear their wishes.

In the old days, the worship was done before sunrise by inserting a Lingaa(a short stem of bamboo) in the lake and returning home before the dawn. However, recently people have started to worship in daylights too.

== Conservation efforts ==
When the water is sufficient in the Satyawati lake, migratory birds spend a few days in this area. Owing to the environmental, religious and touristic significance, the local government and UNDP have developed masterplan to conserve the lake and renovate the temples.
