= Siddha Baba Temple =

Shiva temple in Nepal

- Siddhababa Mandir
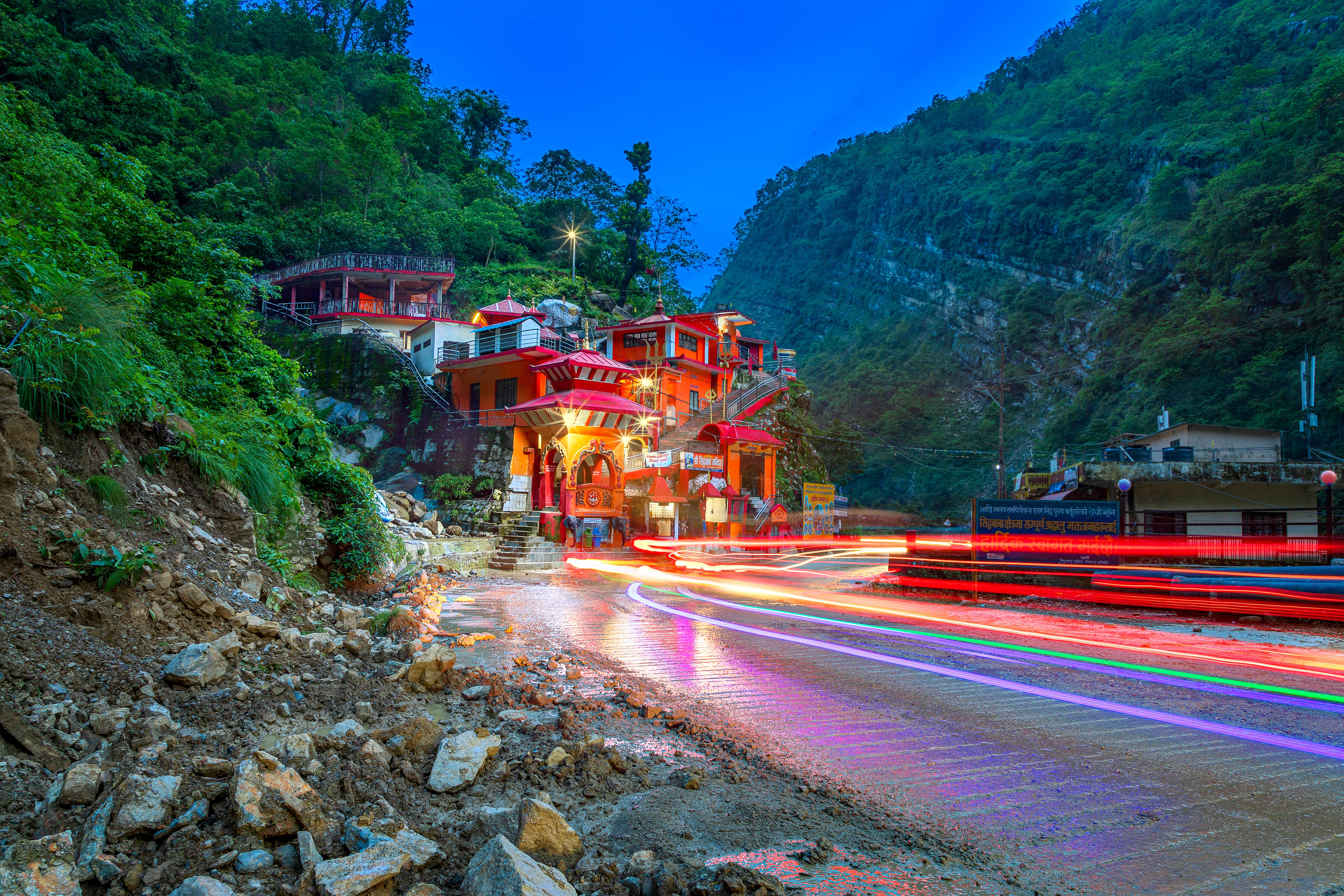

- Location in Nepal

Religion
- Affiliation: Hinduism
- District: Palpa
- Deity: Shiva
- Festivals: Shivaratri, Teej, Bala Chaturdashi etc.

Location
- Location: Butwal
- Country: Nepal
- Interactive map of Siddha Baba Temple
- Coordinates: 27°43′19.06″N 83°28′7.11″E

Siddha Baba Temple (Nepali: श्री सिद्धबाबा मन्दिर) is a Hindu temple of Shiva located near the city of Butwal, Dobhan-5, Palpa district of Nepal. The temple is visited by the people all over Nepal and mostly by the Hindus of Palpa and Rupandehi and neighboring districts. It is believed that the wishes of the devotees who visit the temple comes true. There is a tradition to release a pigeon when a person's wish is fulfilled. This tradition has contributed to large number of pigeon population around the temple.

Hindu people worship at the temple of Siddha Baba during the days of Saturday, Monday and various religious festivals directly and indirectly connected to god Shiva. During the festivals of Shivaratri, a large numbers of Hindus go to the temple for worship.

== Location ==
The temple of Siddha Baba lies in Dobhan-5, Palpa district, Nepal at a distance of about 2 km from Butwal Sub-metro city. The temple is located at left bank of Tinau Riveron the way to Pokhara via Siddhartha Highway.

A small river named Chidiya Khola flows near the temple. The pilgrimage considers water from this river as holy.

== History ==
According to the legend, the temple is believed to be a place of penance of King Bhartrihari, the elder brother of king Vikramaditya-the king who started Bikram Sambat.

Currently, the temple had been registered in the office of District Administration, Palpa in 1998.

== Surrounding ==
Besides, Shiva, the temple houses other deities such as Ganesh, Nag, Mansa Devi and Bishwokarma. A akhand dhuni (continuous holy fire) is located inside the temple. There is a dharmashala (rest house) and a place for performing shradha, parking places, and other public amenities in the temple premises.
