= Lions Eye Hospital =

Hospital in Rupandehi, Nepal

Lions Eye Hospital is an eye hospital established in November 1996, located at Lions Chowk, Butwal-4, Rupandehi district, Nepal.

The hospital is running in its own building constructed by the Lions Club of Butwal. The hospital has 40 beds and 29 staff members.

== History ==
Initially, the hospital was supported by Lumbini Eye Institute (LEI) providing visiting services twice a week. In 2008, the local supporters of Lions Club of Butwal and LEI signed a MOU to support and provide surgical services at the hospital.

== Services ==
The hospital provides following services

- OPD examination
- Refraction service
- Cataract and other surgeries
- ophthalmologist service
- Spectacles sales service ( low cost)
- medicine sales
- Diagnostic screening camps
- School children screening camps
- Eye care awareness training and programs
