= Semalar =

Semalar, Butwal Sub-metropolitan City Ward no. 14,15,16 & 17 सेमलार 0
- sub-metropolitan city
- Location in Nepal
- Coordinates: 27.67°N 83.40°E
- Country: Nepal
- Province: Lumbini Province
- District: Rupandehi District

Government
  - Type: Butwal Sub-metro city

Population (1991)
  - Total: 8,636
- Time zone: UTC+5:45 (Nepal Time)

Semalar is a village settlement nearby Butwal in Rupandehi District in Lumbini Province of southern Nepal. At the time of the 1991 Nepal census it had a population of 8,636 people living in 1,124 individual households. Here is a Shiv temple more than hundred years old located at btl 16 narainapur village and newly made mini phewa Tal, you can ride small boat.
