= Danapur-Kuchira, Nepal =

Danapur Kuchira (Nepali: कुचेरा) is a small village belongs to Kanchan Rural Municipality aka Kanchan Gaupalika ward number 1. Kuchira, actually being a part of Danapur village, is very famous for being the location of the popular Gajedi Taal. This place is developing day by day as being a popular tourist destination.

The area has transitioned from a relatively remote location into a developing tourist destination. In recent years, infrastructure has expanded to include hotels and restaurants catering to visitors, and accessibility has improved via a road connection to the East-West highway.
