= Kanti Higher Secondary School =

Government-run community school in Lumbini Pradesh, Nepal

Coordinates: 27.707°N 83.465°E

- कान्ति उच्च माध्यमिक विद्यालय
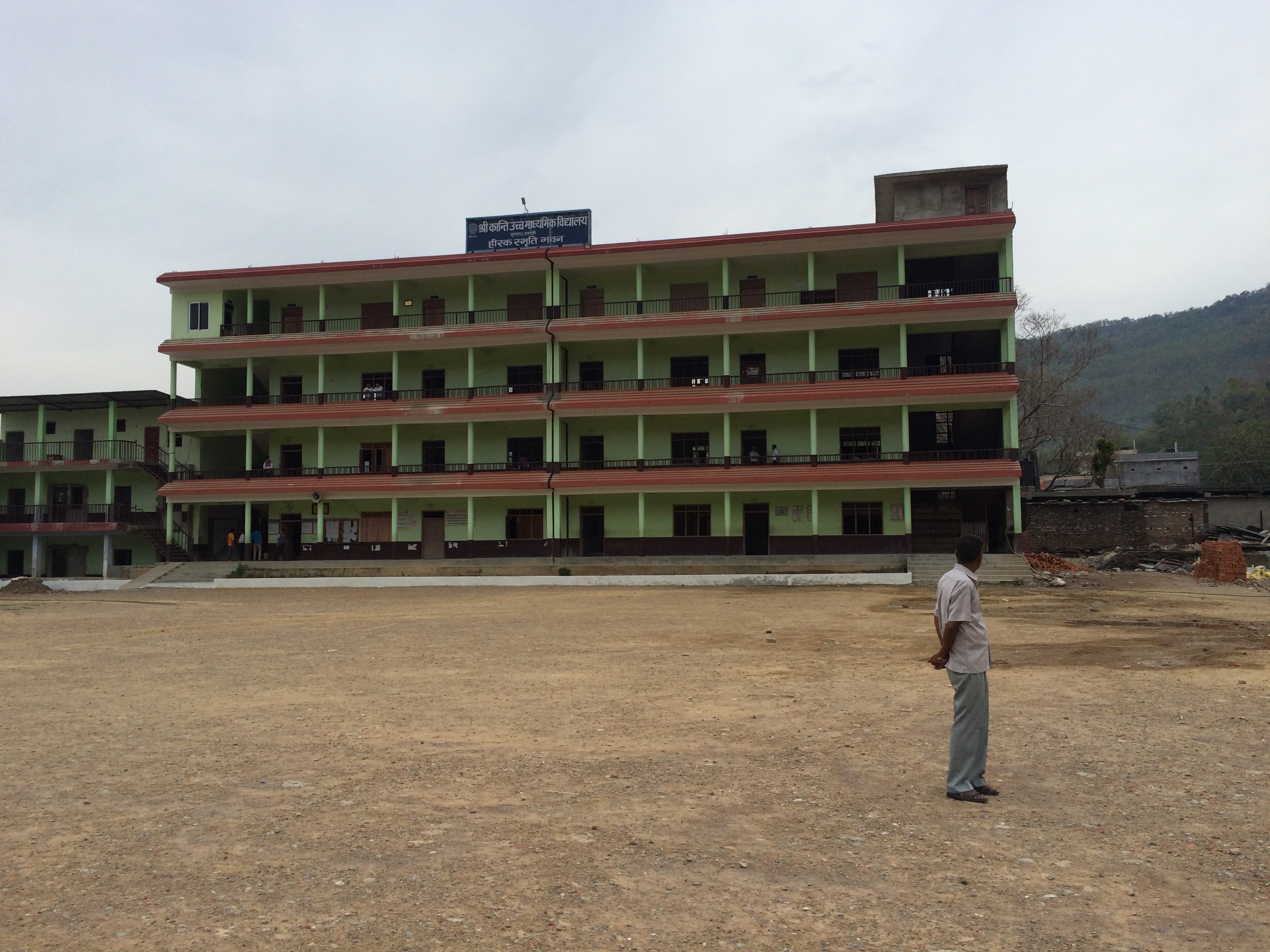

Location
- Butwal, Hatbazzar line Lumbini Pradesh; Nepal

Information
- Other name: कान्ति उच्च माध्यमिक विद्यालय
- Type: Government-run community school
- Established: 1953 A.D. / 2010 B.S.
- School board: National Examination Board (Nepal)
- School district: Rupandehi
- Authorizer: Government of Nepal
- Principal: Govinda Gnawali
- Staff: Approx 220
- Faculty: Approx 20
- Grades: 10+2
- Gender: Coeducational
- Age range: All Ages
- Enrollment: Approx 5200
- Language: English And Nepali
- Campus type: Urban
- Website: kanti.edu.np

Kanti Higher Secondary School (Nepali: कान्ति उच्च माध्यमिक विद्यालय ) is a government community school in Butwal, Nepal. The school is one of few "खुला विद्यालय"or Open School Which offers distance and open learning programs. Its aim is to expand access to higher education for those who may not be able to attend traditional universities. Its aim is to expand access to higher education for those who may not be able to attend traditional universities. Its degrees are equivalent to those from others schools. The school was established in 2010 B.S. The school partially rents the space for the commercial business to raise fund to run the school and provide scholarships to the students.

== Awards ==
- The school received best community school award in 2072BS amongst schools of western Nepal.
