= Tinau Hydropower Plant =

Hydropower station in Nepal

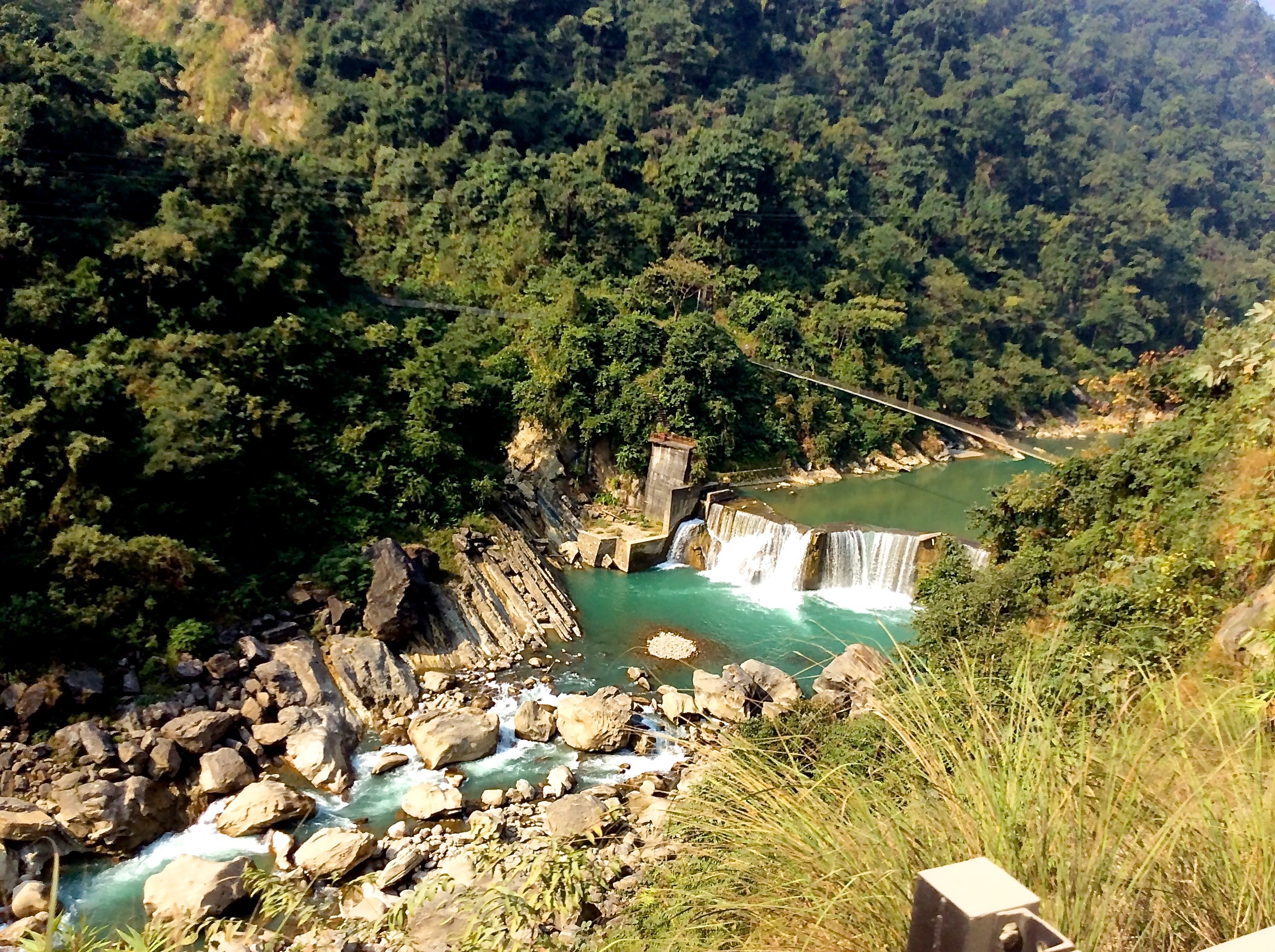

- Location within Nepal
- Official name: Tinau Hydropower Plant
- Country: Nepal
- Coordinates: 27.7390°N 83.4620°E
- Purpose: Power
- Status: Operational
- Owner: Nepal Electricity Authority

Dam and spillways
- Type of dam: Gravity
- Impounds: Tinau River

Tinau Hydropower Plant
- Coordinates: 27.7390°N 83.4620°E
- Commission date: 2038-01-01 BS
- Type: Run-of-the-river
- Turbines: 2 Francis-type hotizotal turbines
- Installed capacity: 1.024 MW

Tinau Hydropower Plant (Nepali: तिनाउ जलविद्युत आयोजना, Tinau Jalbidyut Ayojana) is a run-of-river hydro-electric plant located in Rupandehi District of Nepal. The flow from Tinau River is used to generate 1.024 MW electricity.

The plant was constructed in the leadership of Odd Hoftun. It was commissioned in 1978 with two 250-kW turbine-generators with total capacity of 500-kW. The project was later upgraded to 1.024 MW in assistance from ADB. The project has 2.462 km long tunnel, underground desilting chamber, and semi-underground powerhouse. The weir is 10 m high and 63 m long. The design flow is 2.5 m^{3}/s. The power plant was initially owned by Butwal Power Company, a private company that constructed the plant. After the expiry of licence, the ownership was transferred to Nepal Electricity Authority (NEA).

The plant had suffered damage due to flood in 1983.

== Significance ==
The plant is considered instrumental to train Nepali Technicians/Engineers in various disciplines such as tunnelling, hydropower construction.

== Gallery ==
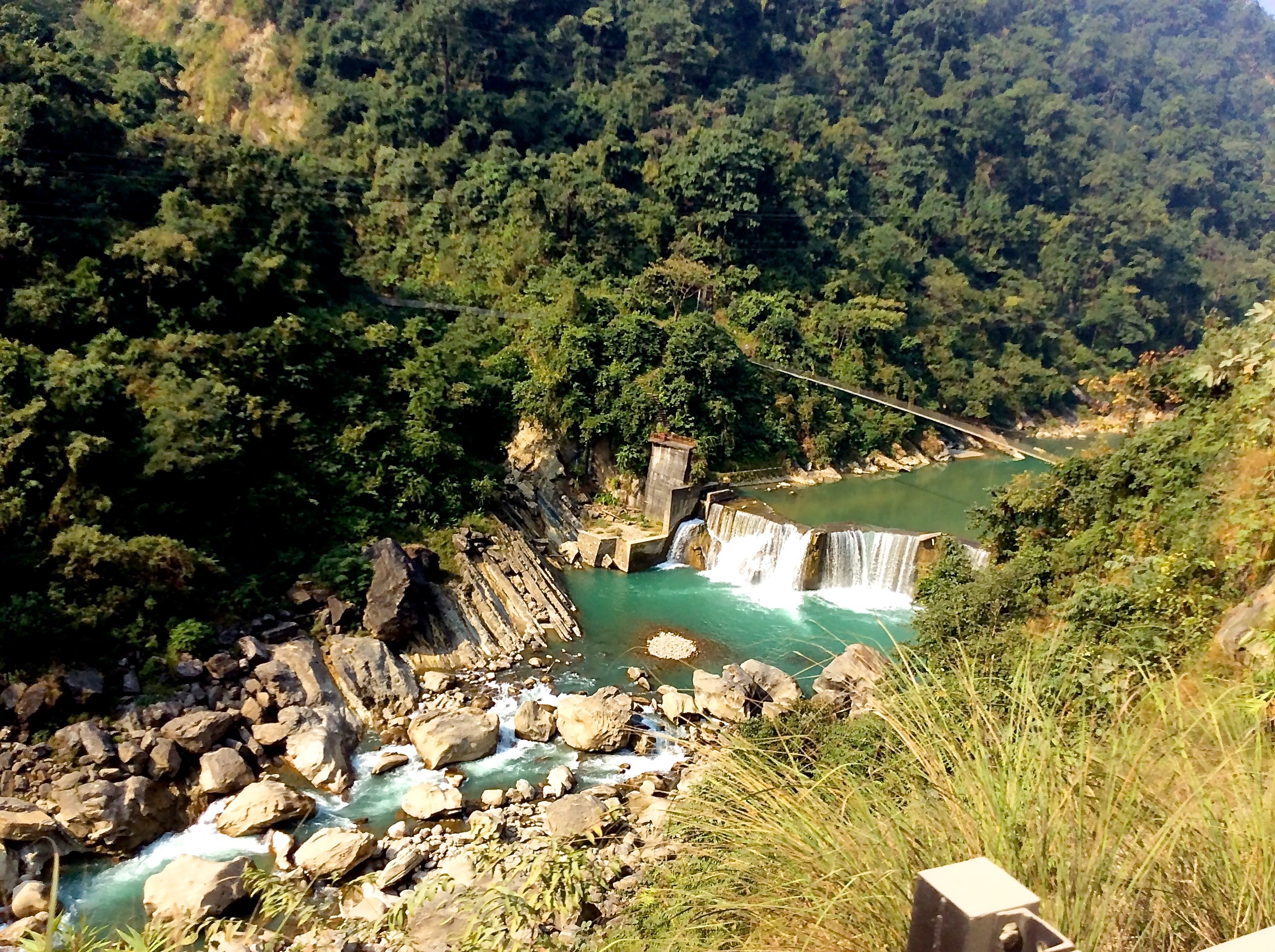
Intake view

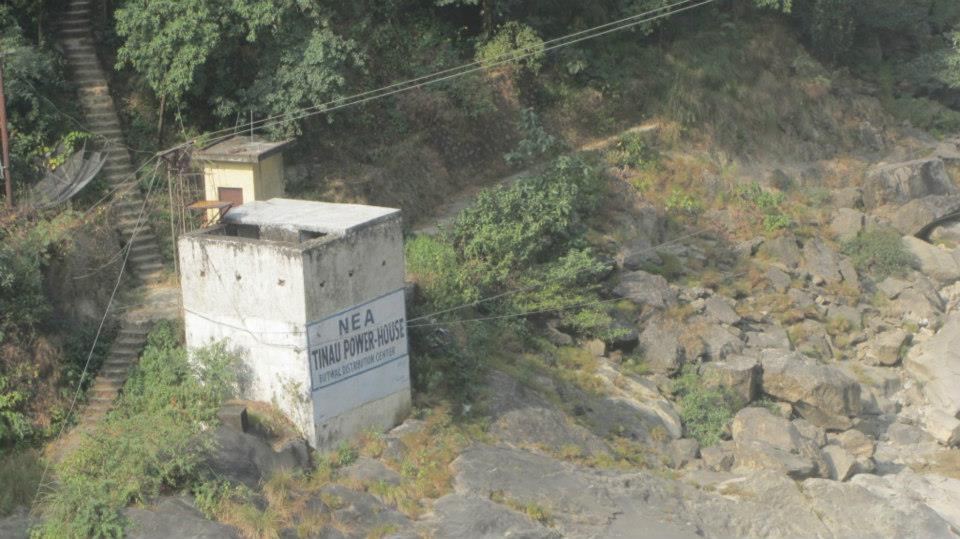
Underground Powerhouse location

== See also ==
List of power stations in Nepal
