= Siddhababa Tunnel =

Under construction highway tunnel in Nepal

Overview
- Location: Lumbini Province, Nepal
- Status: Under construction
- Route: NH 47

Operation
- Work began: December 2023
- Traffic: Automotive

Technical
- Length: 1.126 kilometres (0.700 mi)
- No. of lanes: Two (one in each direction)

Siddhababa Tunnel (Nepali: सिद्धबाबा सुरुङ) is a highway tunnel, currently under-construction, along the Butwal-Palpa section of the Siddhartha Highway in Nepal. The total length of the tunnel is 1,126 m (3,694 ft). The tunnel features double lanes, an 8.5 m (28 ft) width, and sidewalks to facilitate pedestrian safety.

== Construction project ==
The project is being completed by China State Construction Engineering Corporation for around NPR 7.34 billion. The project is scheduled to be finished by March 2027. Construction was delayed after the 2026 Nepal–Tibet floods swept away electromechanical equipment in transport to the construction site. As of September 2026, construction is 69.57% complete.

The initial cost estimate of the project is about NPR 10 billion.

== See also ==
- List of tunnels in Nepal
