= Manimukunda Sen Park =

Public park in Butwal, Nepal

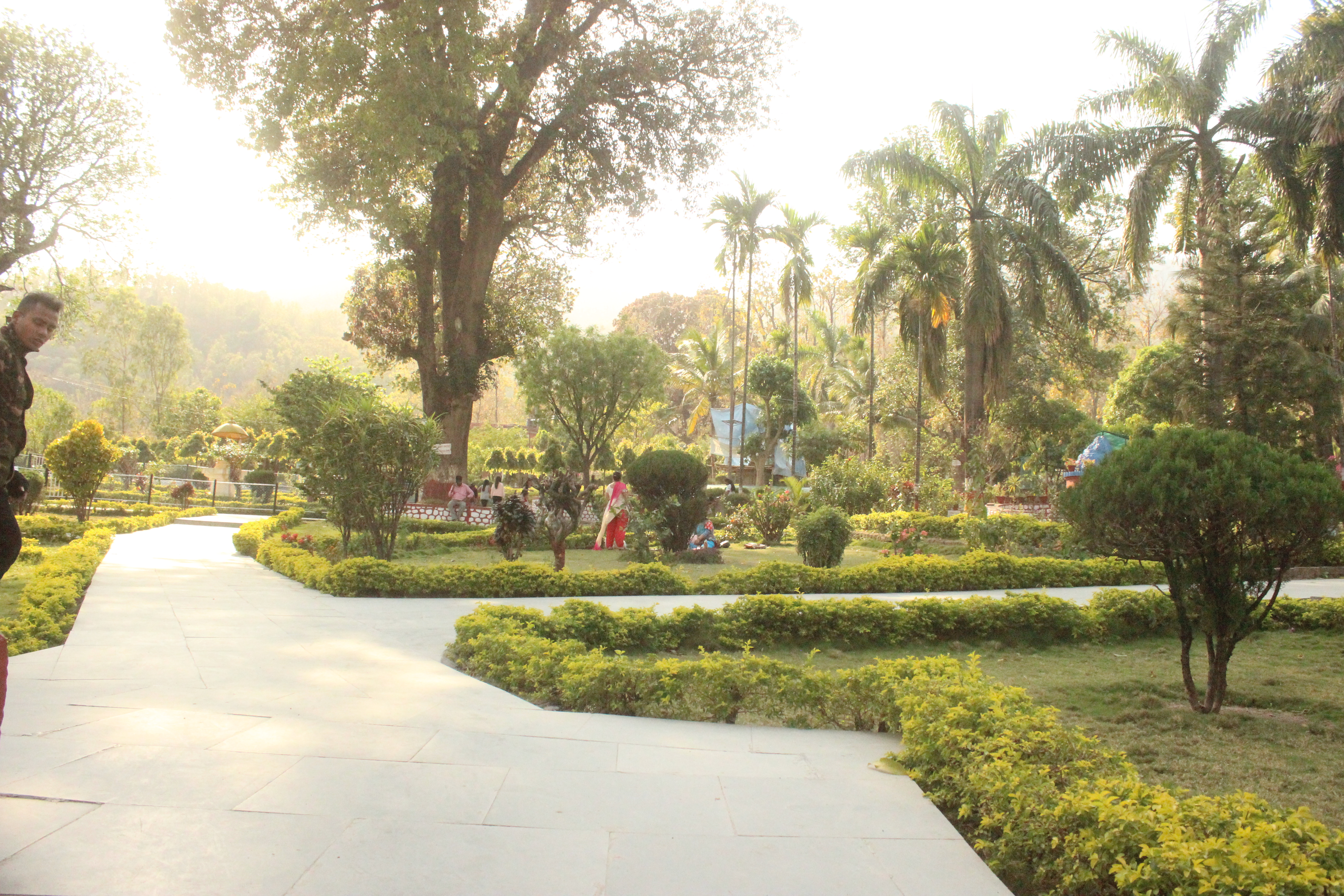
- View of Manimukunda Sen Park
- Interactive map of Manimukunda Sen Park
- Location: Butwal, Rupendehi
- Coordinates: 27.7062962°N 83.455195°E
- Operator: Manimukund Sen Udyan Conservation Committee

Manimukunda Sen Park (Nepali: माणिमुकुन्द उद्यान), locally known as Phulbari (Nepali: फुलबारी), is a historic site and a major tourist attraction in Rupandehi district of Nepal. The park houses a ruin of palace of king Manimukunda Sen of medieval Palpa Kingdom. The park is located in western side of Butwal city. About 800,000 tourists visit this park anuualy out of which more than 100,000 are Indian tourists. The park is spread over an area of 16 bigahs of land.

== History ==
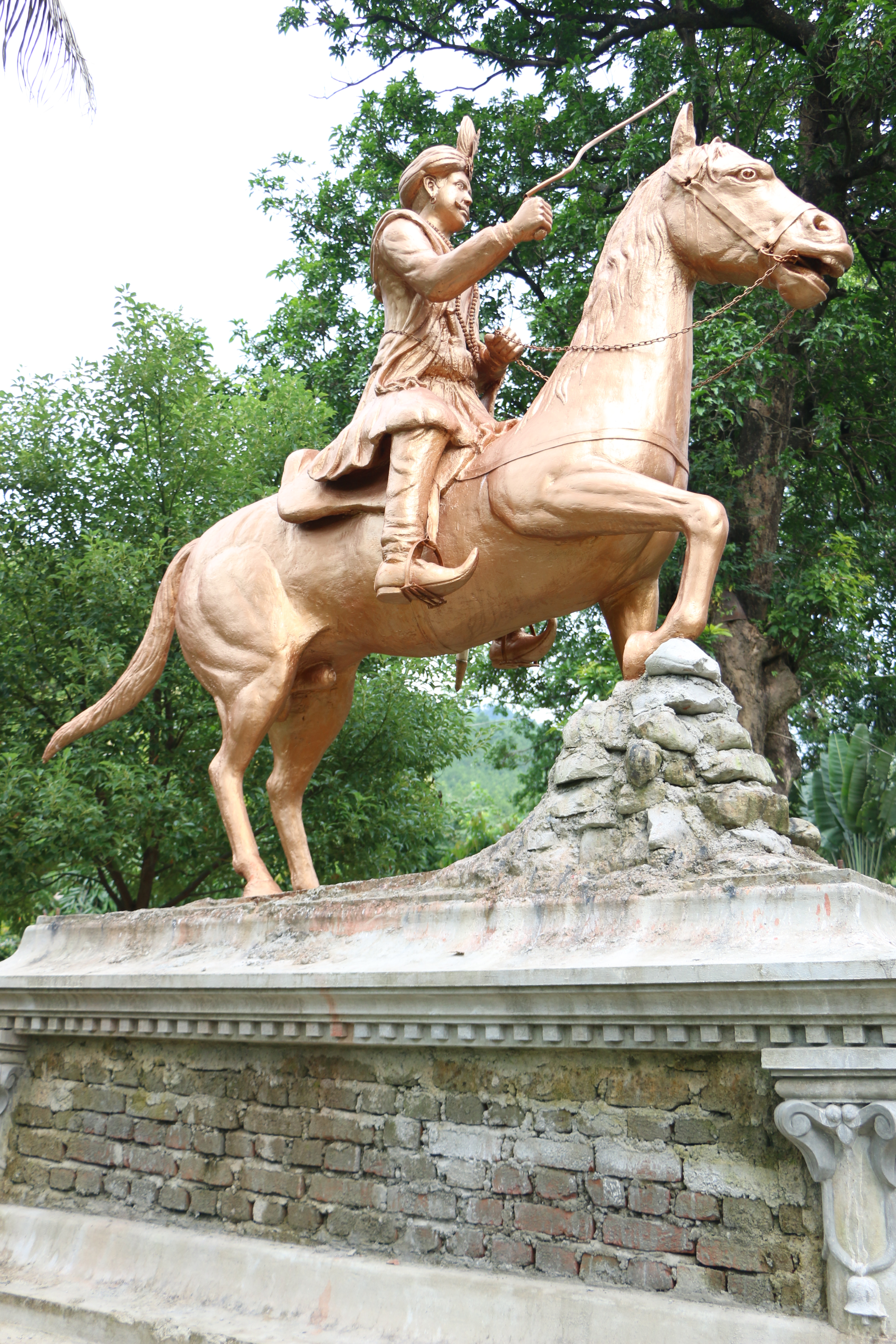
Statue of Mani Mukunda Sen in the park

The garden is believed to be constructed in 16th century. In 1575 BS (1518–1519), king Manimukunda Sen of Palpa kingdom, build a winter palace in this area. After the Palpa Kingdom was merged with the kingdom of Nepal in 1863 BS, the palace and the park was abandoned and turned in to ruins.

=== Revival ===
In 2037 BS (1980–1981), the Butwal Nagar Panchyat led by Munnilal Shakya, started to renaissance the garden for its historic importance. To attract national level attention, the park was named Aishwarya Park after the name of Queen Aishwarya. Before that time, the place had turned into a waste disposal site of Butwal Municipality.

After the initiation of 2037 BS (1980–1981), some revival was done. The journalists of that time including Suryalal and Dil Sahni wrote about the historic importance of the place and its link with Jeetgarhi area. In 2049 BS (1992–1993), after the establishment of the multi-party democratic system, Surya Prasad Pradhan provided funds to reconstruct the park. Pradhan was a mayor at that time. The area was cleaned and beautification works were started. Community fund were collected by Prasad Uday and Rishi Gyawali for the reconstruction work. In the time of mayor Bhoj Prasad Shrestha, in 2054 BS (1997–1998) Manimukund Sen Udyan Conservation Committee was formed. Since then the park was formally named as Manimukund Sen Park. The committee was given status of an autonomous organization in 2065 BS (2008–2009).

A regional level zoo is under construction inside the park.
