= Padma Chaitya Bihar =

Buddhist monastery in Butwal, Nepal

Padma Chaitya Vihar
- पद्म चैत्य विहार
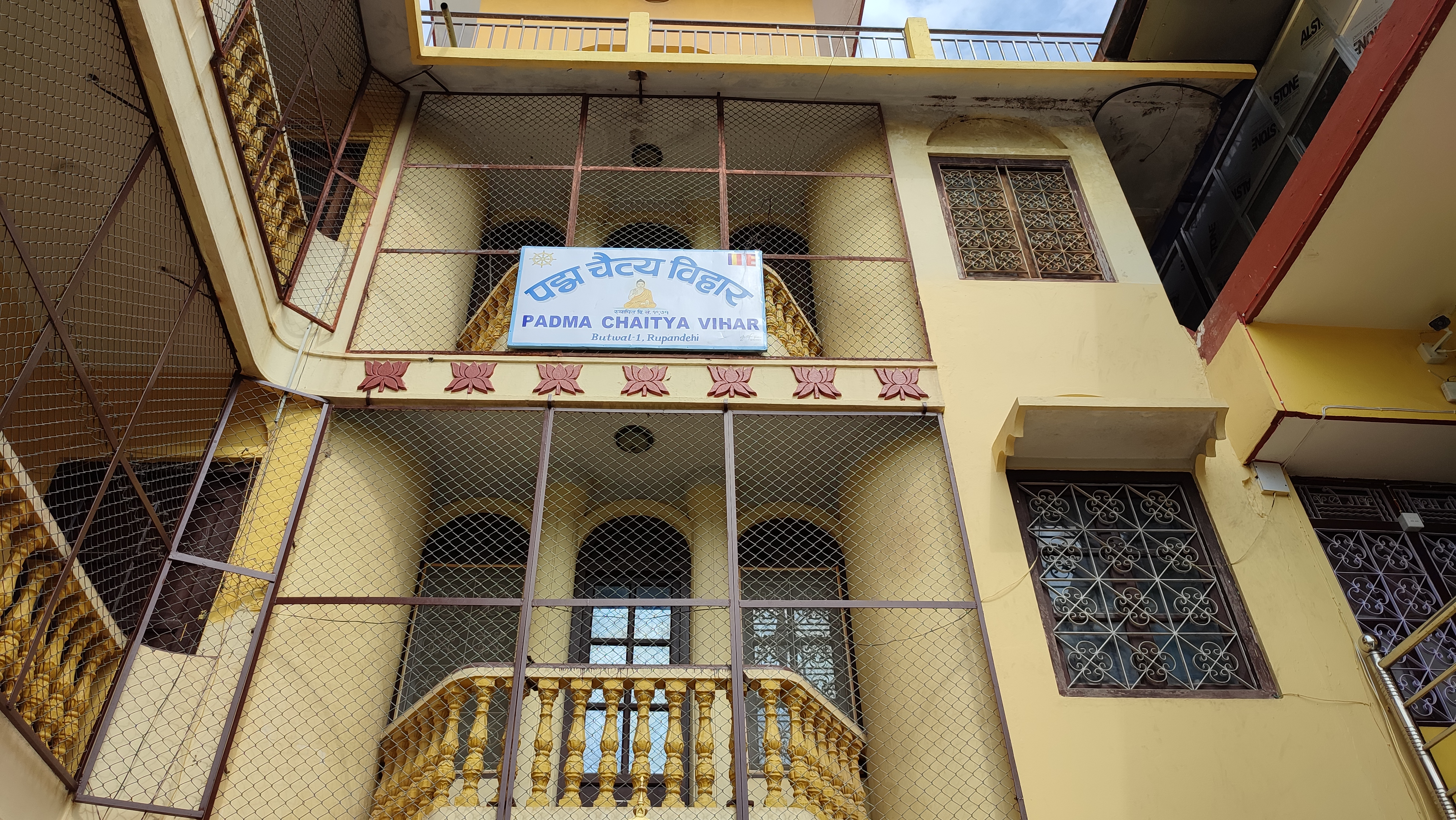

Religion
- Affiliation: Buddhism

Location
- Location: Butwal
- Country: Nepal
- Interactive map of Padma Chaitya Vihar
- Coordinates: 27.7065°N 83.457°E

Padma Chaitya Vihar is a Buddhist monastery located in Butwal, Nepal. It was established in 1971 BS (1914–1915) when the Newar people came for settlement in this area. It is believed that the monastery was established before any significant settlement occurred in Butwal. The monastery is funded by the local and international volunteers.
