= Tamnagar =

Coordinates: 27°51′0″N 85°32′0″E

Tamnagar तामनगर
- subdivision of Butwal Municipality
- Motto: 27°41'04.7"N 83°23'49.9"E
- Interactive map of Tamnagar
- Country: Nepal
- Province: Lumbini Province
- District: Rupandehi District

Population (1991)
  - Total: 5,786
- Time zone: UTC+5:45 (Nepal Time)

Tamnagar is a former Village Development Committee (VDC) and now part of Butwal Sub-Metropolitan municipality in Rupandehi District in Lumbini Province of southern Nepal. At the time of the 1991 Nepal census it had a population of 5786 people living in 1129 individual households.
