= Lumbini Provincial Hospital =

Hospital in Butwal, Lumbini, Nepal

Lumbini Provincial Hospital लुम्बिनी प्रादेशिक अस्पताल
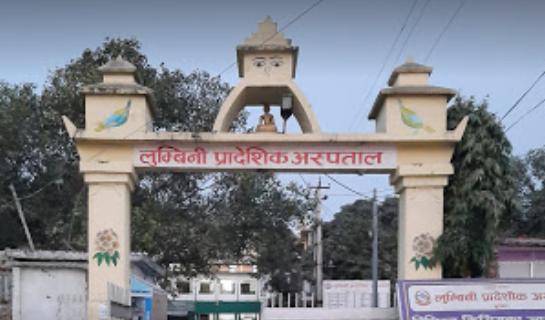

Geography
- Location: Butwal, Lumbini Province

Organisation
- Type: Provincial Level Hospital

History
- Former name: Lumbini Zonal Hospital
- Opened: 1967 BS (1910–1911)

Links
- Website: https://lphospital.lumbini.gov.np/

Lumbini Provincial Hospital (Nepali: लुम्बिनी प्रादेशिक अस्पताल) is a government hospital located in Butwal in Lumbini Province of Nepal. The hospital is considered a crucial resource for healthcare to poor citizens who cannot afford private hospitals.It has extended its services from Lumbini Zone to Lumbini Province. It is referred as one of the biggest hospital in Nepal. Indian people living near the Indo-Nepal border also takes advantage of this hospital service.

== History ==
Late Prime Minister Chandra Sumsher JB Rana had established a small 6 bedded dispensary for Royal Palace station in 1967 BS (1910–1911). This small dispensary was upgraded with time. The present hospital came in operation in 2020 BS (1963–1964) with 50 beds.

The bed number was later increased to 200 to meet the demand of local people served by 29 doctors, 31 nurses giving service to 19 people per day on average.
