= Eden English Boarding High School =

Eden English Boarding School
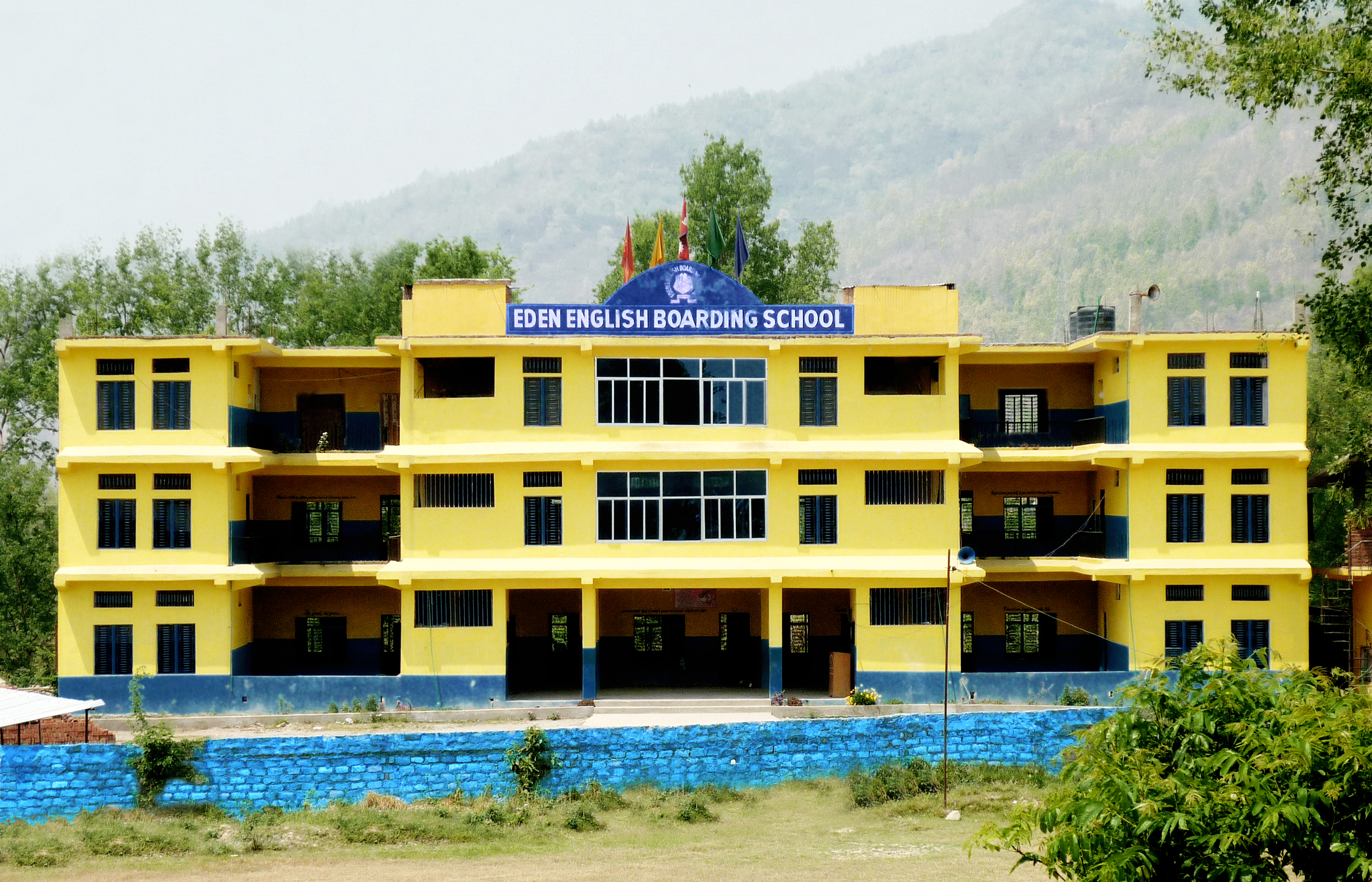
- Front view of school

Location
- Butwal, Rupandehi District; Nepal
- Coordinates: 27°41′02.2″N 83°26′49.9″E

Information
- Type: Coeducational
- Language: English

Eden English Boarding High School (Nepali: ईडन इंग्लिश बोर्डिगं हाई स्कूल) is a school located in Butwal city, Rupandehi District. Though the school is located on Butwal Sub-metro but focuses on the students to be collected from mid-urban communities of nearby areas.

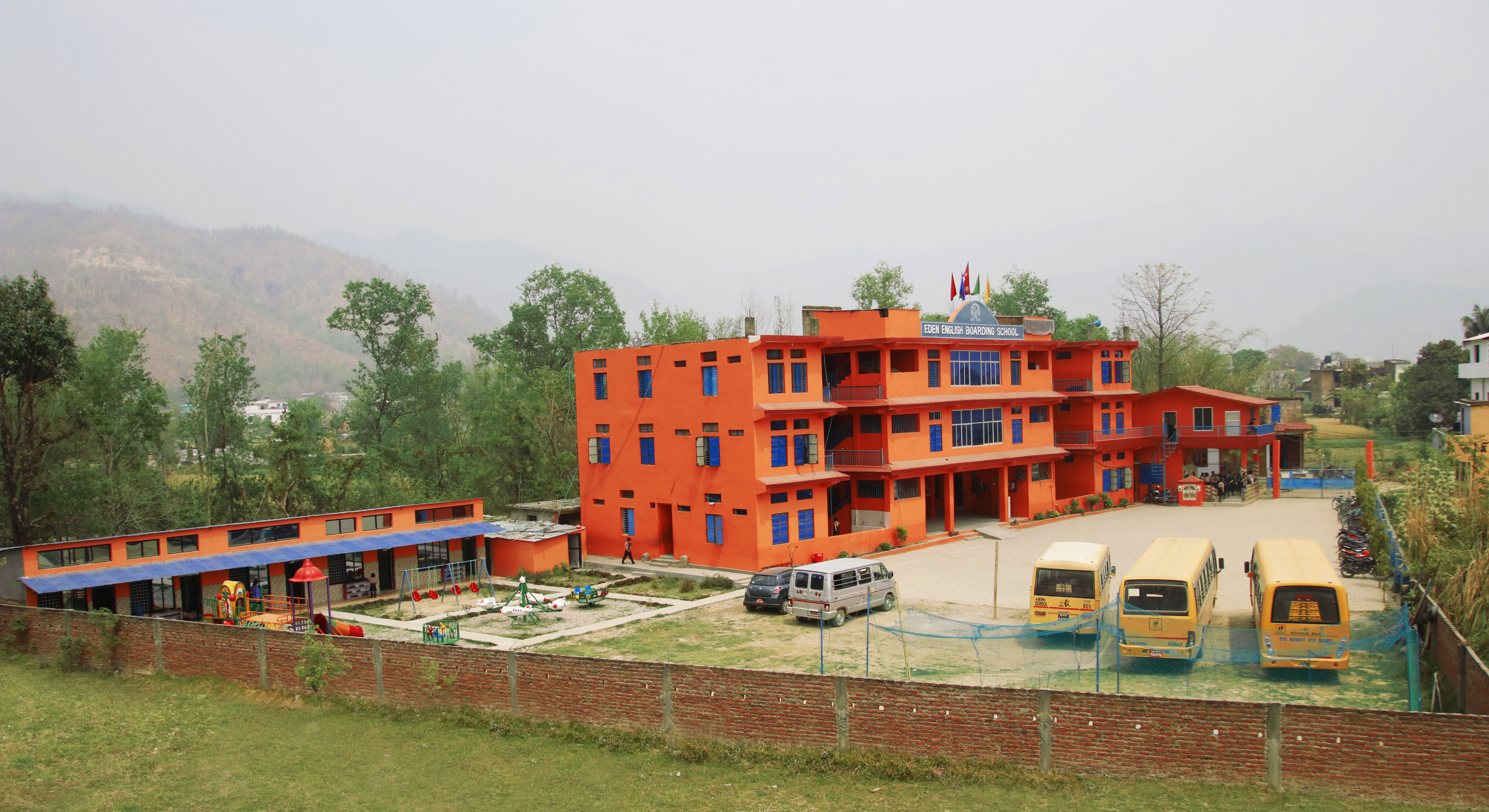
School building after the renovation work done in 2075 BS (2018/2019)

== See also ==
- Education in Nepal
- Higher Secondary Education Board
