= Butwal =

Sub-Metropolitan City, Rupandehi Nepal

Butwal बुटवल
- Sub-Metropolitan City
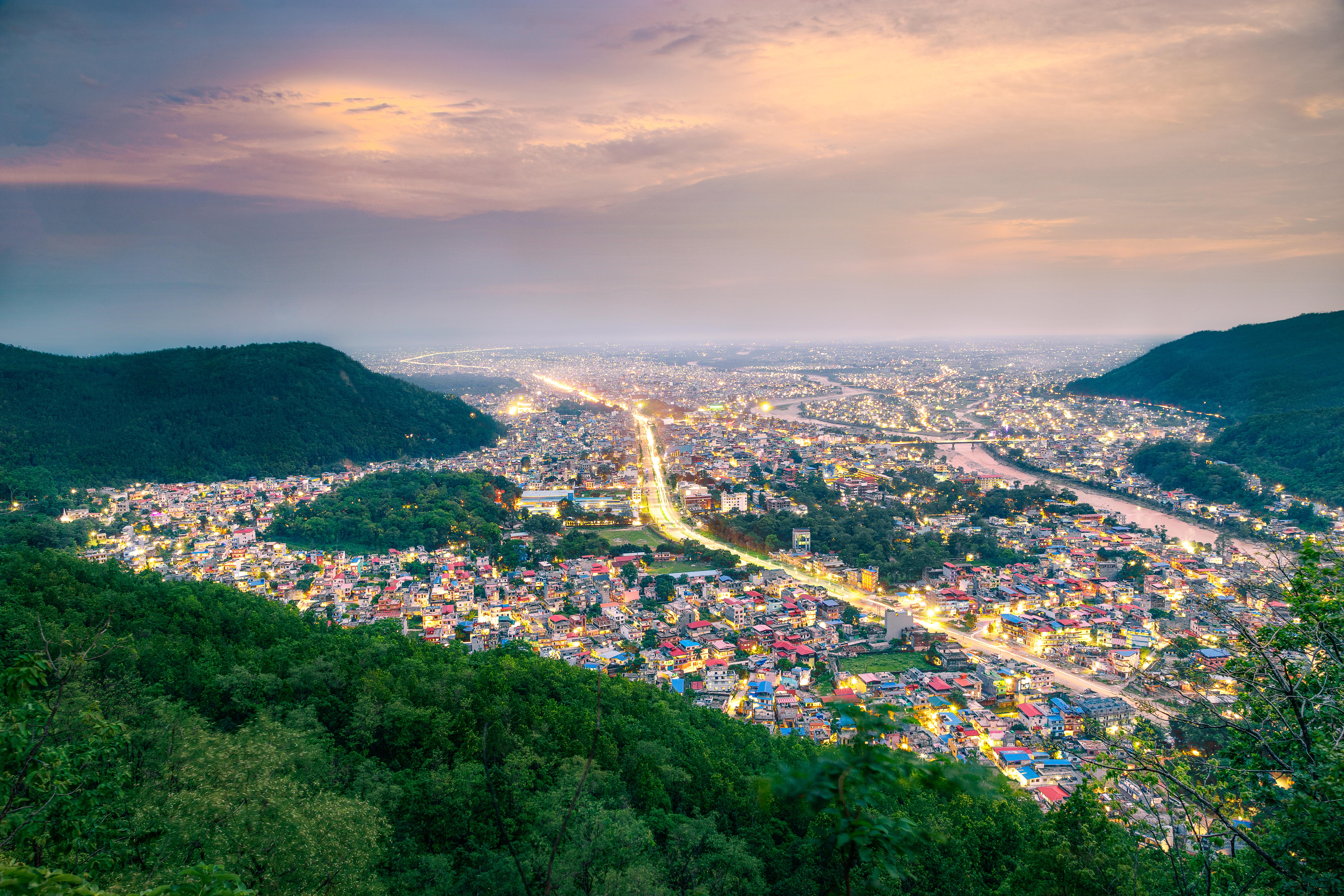
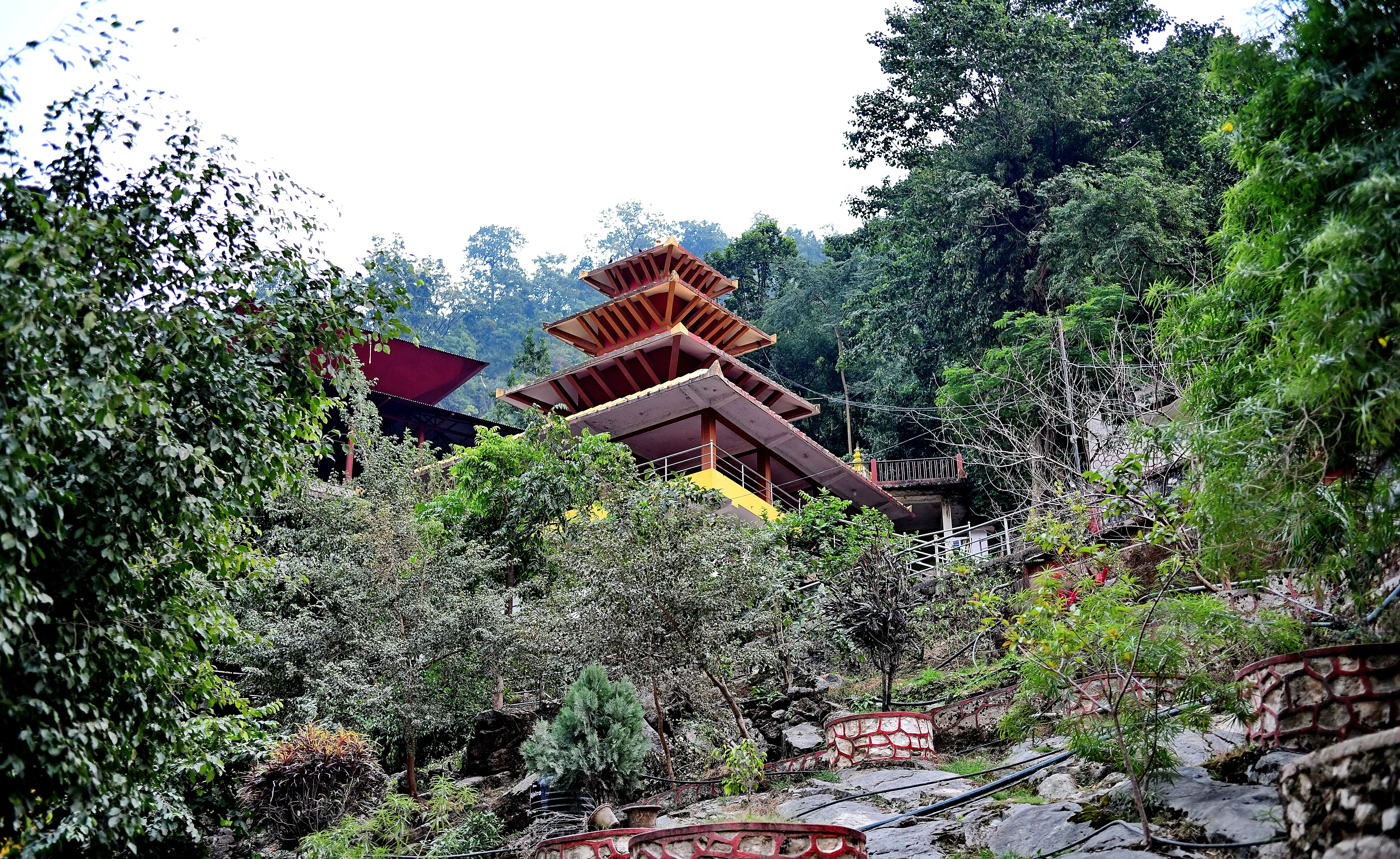
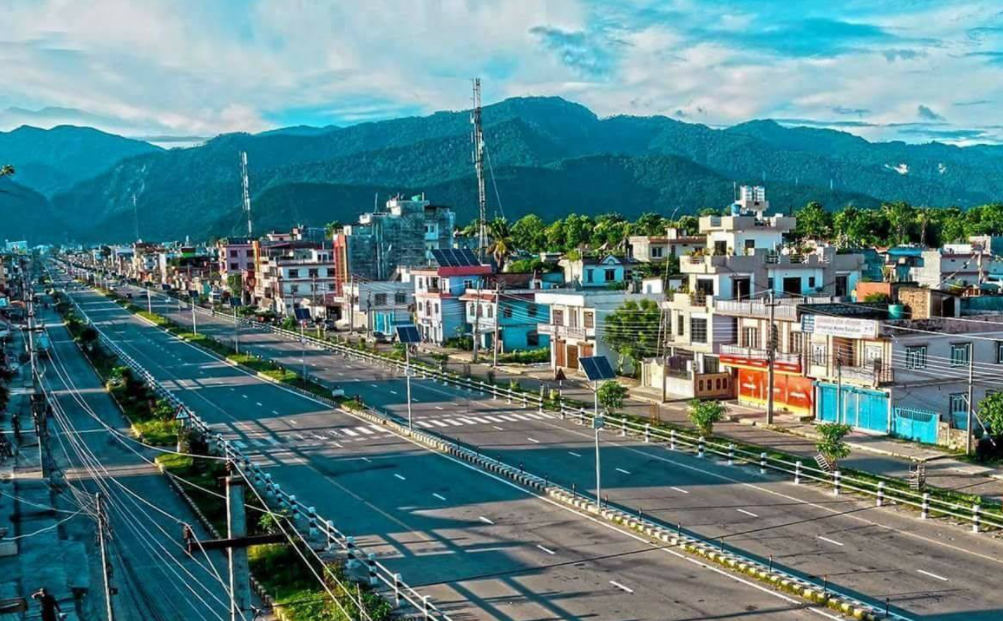
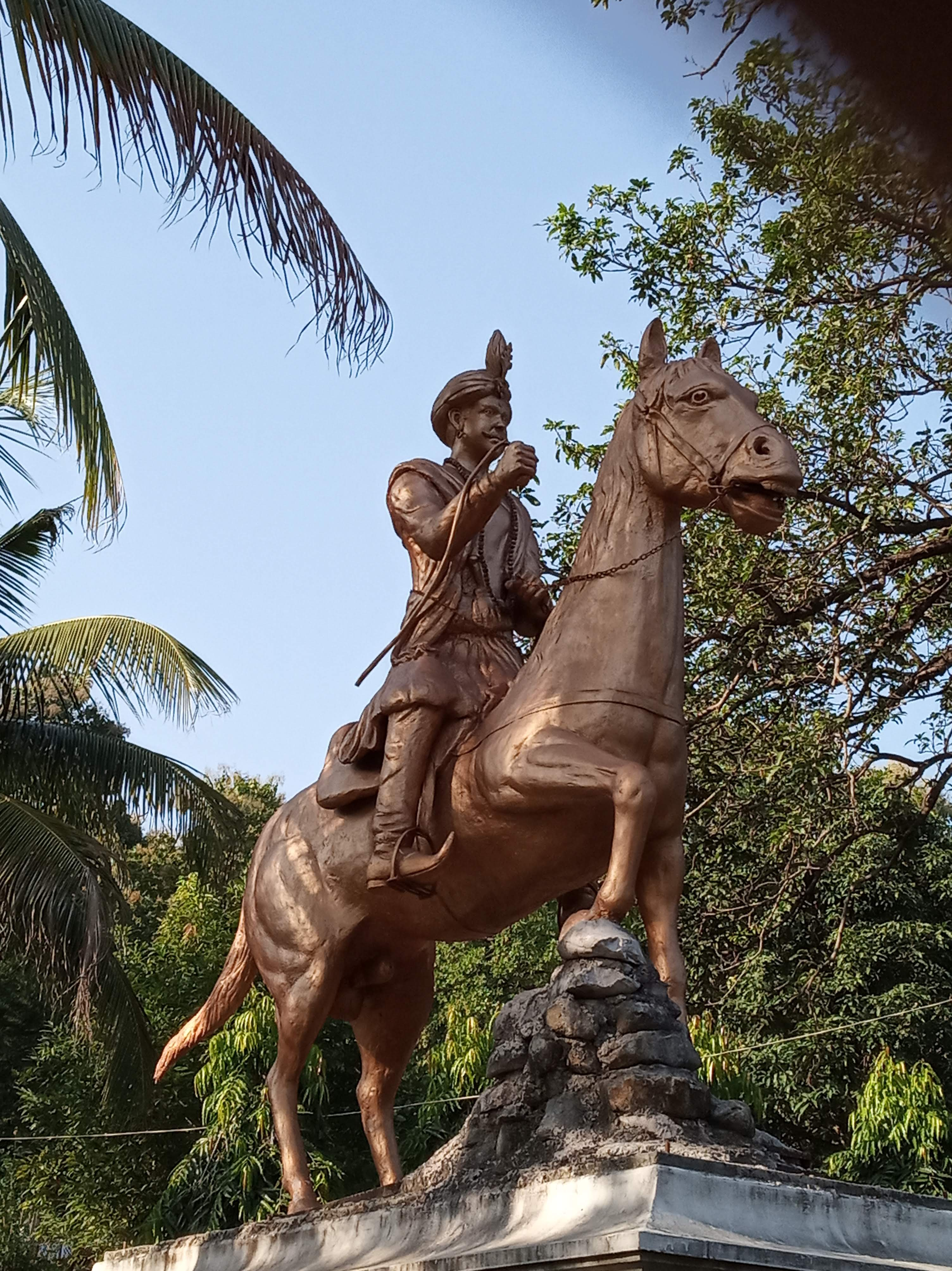
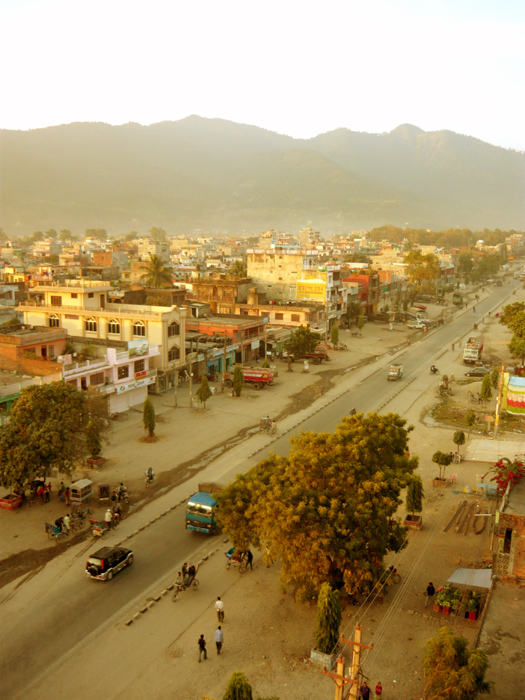
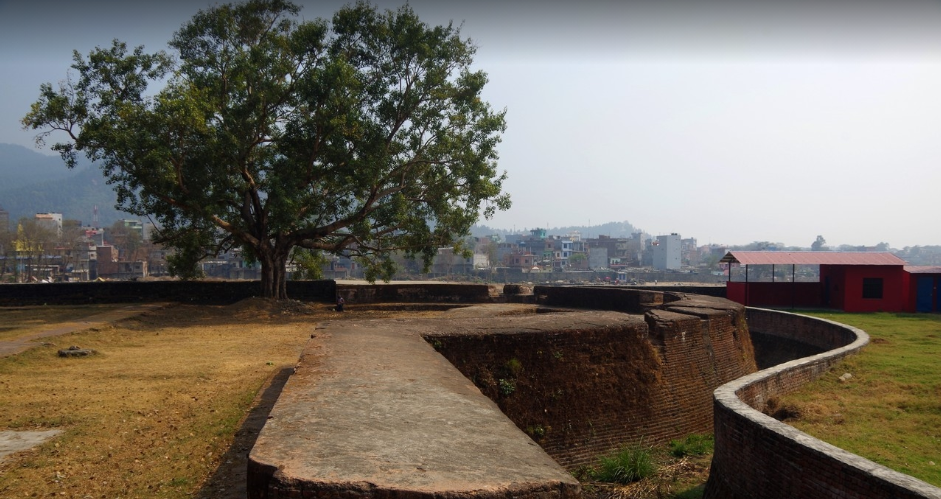
- Clockwise from top: Butwal, Siddhababa Temple, Siddhartha Rajmarga, Manimukundasen, Butwal, Jit Gadhi
- Etymology: derived from Batauli Bazaar
- Location of Butwal in province Butwal (Nepal)
- Coordinates: 27.70°N 83.466°E
- Country: Nepal
- Province: Lumbini
- District: Rupandehi
- Metropolitan: Butwal

Government
  - Mayor: Khel Raj Pandey (Congress)
  - Deputy Mayor: Sabitra Devi Aryal (CPN(UML))

Area
  - Total: 101.61 km^{2} (39.23 sq mi)
- Elevation: 150 m (490 ft)

Population (2021 Nepal census)
  - Total: 195,054
  - Rank: 12th (Nepal); 2nd (Lumbini Province)
  - Density: 1,920/km^{2} (5,000/sq mi)
  - Ethnicities: Magar Thakuri Newar Tharu Kami Gurung Damai Chhetri Bahun
- 2021 Nepal census
- Time zone: UTC+5:45 (NST)
- Post code: 32907
- Area code: 071
- Website: butwalmun.gov.np

Butwal (Nepali: बुटवल), officially Butwal Sub-Metropolitan City (Nepali: बुटवल उपमहानगरपालिका), previously known as Khasyauli (Nepali: खस्यौली), is a sub-metropolitan city and economic hub in Lumbini Province in West Nepal. As of 2021, Butwal has a city population of 195,054.

The city is one of the tetra-cities of rapidly growing Butwal-Tilottama-Bhairahawa-Devdaha urban agglomeration primarily based on the Siddhartha Highway in West Nepal with a total urban agglomerated population of 4,74,541. It is one of the fastest-growing cities in Nepal for health, education, construction, communication, trade, and banking sectors. It has highway connections to the Indian border at Sunauli and to the hilly towns in Tansen and Pokhara valley, and holds the title of being "The Best City in Nepal" five times in a row.

Geographically, Butwal is at the intersection of Nepal's two different National Highways, Mahendra Highway and Siddhartha Highway. It connects western Nepal with the capital Kathmandu through the highway and air links (via Gautam Buddha International Airport at Siddharthanagar). The city stands beside the bank of Tinau River, and at the northern edge of the Terai plain below the Siwalik Hills. Its name, Butwal was derived from Batauli Bazaar, the town's oldest residential area which is located on the western bank of the Tinau River.

Butwal was officially declared as a sub-metropolitan city on 2 December 2014 AD by combining two neighboring VDCs Motipur and Semlar. The sub-metropolitan city is currently headed by Nepali Congress leader Khel Raj Pandey.

== History ==
=== Prehistory ===
Fossils of ancient hominoids Ramapithecus were found near the Tinau (Tilottama) River, also known as paari Butwal, as early as 1932, including a 10.1-million-year-old tooth.

=== Medieval history ===
In medieval time Butwal was known as Khasauli as it was believed to be established by Khas king. Later after the collapse of the Khasa empire it was ruled by the Sen kings of Palpa when it developed as a trading point between hilly people and plain people. In the 17th century Palpa with Butwal was annexed by Gorkha Empire. Butwal was also a place where a major battle of the Anglo-Nepalese war was fought i.e. Battle of Jitgadi Fort where the Gorkha army led by Ujir Singh Thapa beat the British forces.

=== Modern history ===
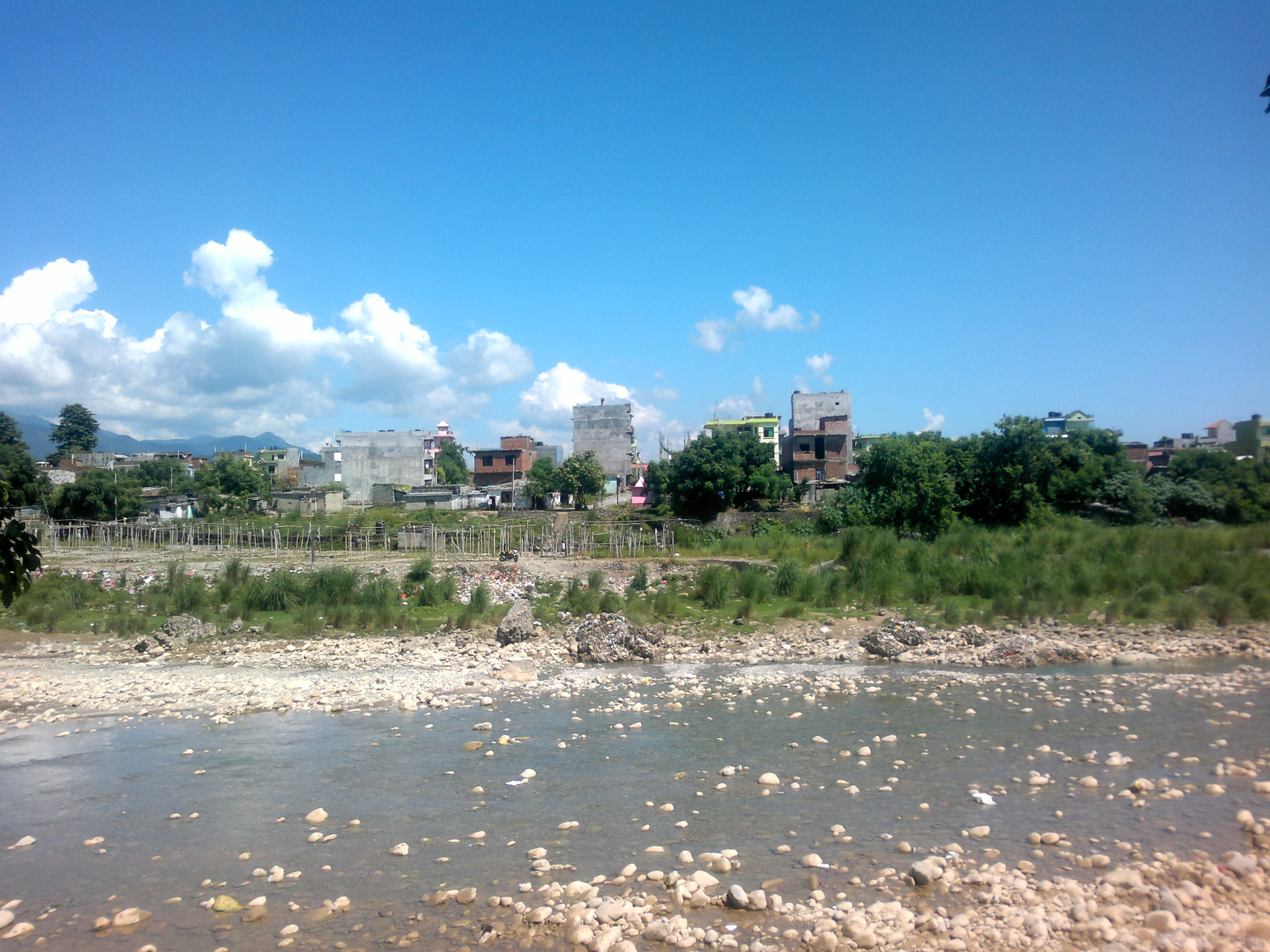
As recently as 1950, Butwal was a minor village on the western bank of Tilottama River (also known as Tinau)

The area was a loose settlement that acted as a trading post between the hilly districts of the Lumbini zone and the Indian plains. Thus, historically Butwal connected Nepali Pahari people with their Indian neighbors. As the British East India Company annexed Awadh from its hereditary rulers while the Shah Dynasty attempted to annex the Terai, Butwal became one of the bones of contention leading to the Gurkha War 1814–16 AD.

When King Tribhuvan fled to India in 1950 during the revolt against the Rana dynasty he traveled through Butwal. Then it was little more than a village on the western bank of Tilottama River (also known as Tinau).

Butwal is a relatively newly urbanized area, emerging and growing rapidly only since 1960 AD. With the completion of the Siddhartha Highway (H10) in 1968 AD, starting from the border at Sunauli through Butwal to Pokhara and then in1990s Mahendra Highway(H01) across the full east–west expanse of Nepal's Terai. Butwal has made tremendous progress in the country.

Today

== Demographics ==
The population of Butwal is 91,733 (census 2015 AD), according to the present stage the population is rapidly increasing with around 150,000 and above and consists of people of mixed groups and castes; these include Pahari immigrants from nearby hill districts especially Palpa, Arghakhanchi, Parbat, Gulmi, Syangja and also local people from Terai origin.

The population distribution in different wards in 2011 was as follows:

Ward No.	Households	Population	Male	Female
1	205	980	489	491
2	189	1053	520	522
3	240	1337	664	673
4	1491	6487	3353	3134
5	3039	10842	5476	5366
6	2,368	9,603	4,995	4,608
7	669	3202	1725	1477
8	1,598	6,787	3,470	3,317
9	2631	10597	5019	5578
10	3175	11942	5856	6086
11	2445	9170	4723	4447
12	1114	24361	2092	22269
13	7258	28193	13834	14359
14	1566	6542	3101	3441
15	1674	7366	3491	3875
16	778	3566	1640	1926
17	****	****	****	****
18	****	****	****	****
19	****	****	****	****
20	****	****	****	****
21	****	****	****	****
22	****	****	****	****
Total	29662	118462	58808	59654

Religion in Butwal (2011)
Religion	Percent
Hinduism	89%
Buddhism	7%
Islam	2%
Others	1%

=== Caste and Ethnic groups ===
Caste and Ethnic groups in Butwal
1. Hill Brahman (30.0%)
2. Magar (19.0%)
3. Chhetri (14.0%)
4. Newar (8.00%)
5. Tharu (7.00%)
6. Kami (5.00%)
7. others (18.0%)

The largest single caste and ethnic groups in butwal is Hill Brahman, who makes 30% of the population, Magar with 19% comes to second place, Other ethnic groups in butwal includes the Chhetri (14%),Newar (8%), Tharu (7%), and others various ethnic groups makes(23%) of the population.

Broad Caste and Ethnicity category (2011 Census)
Broad Ethnic Category	Sub Category	Linguistic Family	Population Percentage
Khas Aryan (Pahari Caste Groups)	Khas Brahmin, Chhetri, Kami, Thakuri, Damai Sarki, Sanyasi/Dasnami	Indo-Aryan	53.9%
Janajati (Pahari Tribal Groups)	Magar, Tamang, Gurung, Sherpa, Rai, Limbu etc.	Sino-Tibetan	24.1%
Newar (Kathmandu Valley Caste Groups)	Newari Brahmin, Shrestha, Tamrakar, Newar Buddhist, Maharjan, Rajkarnikar etc.	Indo-Aryan And Sino-Tibetan	7.6%
Adibasi (Terai Indigenous Groups)	Tharu, Rajbanshi, Tajpuriya etc.	Indo-Aryan And Sino-Tibetan	6.6%
Madeshi (Terai Caste Groups)	Yadav, Brahmins, Chamar, Kushwaha, Musahar, Kurmi, Dhanuk etc.	Indo-Aryan	2.4%
Muslim	-	Indo-Aryan	2.2%
Others	-	-	1.5%

=== Languages ===
Languages in Butwal
1. Nepali (73.0%)
2. Magar (8.00%)
3. Tharu (5.00%)
4. Newari (5.00%)
5. Others (9.00%)

At the time of the 2021 Census of Nepal, Nepali 152,970 78.7% Magar Dhut 13,309 6.8% Tharu 9,549 4.9% Nepalbhasha 5,912 3.0% Bhojpuri 4,534 2.3% Gurung 2,742 1.4% Hindi 2,030 1.0% Maithili 749 0.4%

== Economy ==
Butwal is mostly a commercial and trading city, an upcoming link city for the nearby tourist spots. The GDP of Butwal was about US$1 billion in 2018, making it one of the major cities in Nepal. The economy of Butwal centers around trade, services, and industries. The old trading spots are Traffic Chowk, BP Chowk, Amarpath, Raj Margh Chaurah, and Nepalgunj Road. Besides modern shopping, a traditional form of the market called Haat Bazar similar to greengrocer runs twice a week on Wednesdays and Saturdays. It has the second largest vegetable market in the country called Butwal Sabji Mandi in local terms. All kinds of traders, farmers, and entrepreneurs sell goods and vegetables directly to retail & wholesale customers in a busy market setup.

Service aspects of the economy are mainly centered on banking, education, transportation, health sectors and logistics. Butwal has emerged as a major logistics hub in Nepal. Thus, increasing numbers of people are involved in these sectors for their jobs. The Hotel industry is one example of this, as Hyatt Hotels opened a location located at the intersection of the Mahendra and Siddhartha highways. This takes the city from a transit city into a commercial hub, paving other worldwide businesses to locate here.

With the growing infrastructure of the internet, e-marketing has been on the rise in small and medium-sized businesses. A study shows that 98% of respondents said they have used social media as an e-marketing tool in their business. This shows the growing economy in this region due to social media and the widespread use of internet access.

Butwal is also a connecting city between nearby tourist towns of Tansen, Kapilvastu, and Lumbini. It is the gateway to nearby cities of Sunwal, Pokhara, and Bharatpur. It is also a busy land route to enter Nepal from India for tourists and others. Thus, Butwal is witnessing huge investments in the hospitality sector as well. To boost up tourism and MICE opportunities, the government plans to set up an international conference center at Ramnagar in Butwal. All these developments hint towards a large economic potential for the development of the region.

One recent development in this region is the Lumbini Cable Car, connecting the Rupandehi and Palpa districts. This has been a symbol of tourism has it has allowed access to other temples in the region where it wasn't accessible before. With the rise of tourism, the city's economy has risen in recent years.

The private commerce and trade in Butwal are united under the umbrella of the Butwal Chamber of Commerce & Industry (BuCCI). Audhyogig Byapar Mela-Butwal is an industrial exhibition held in Butwal. This exhibition is organized annually in the month of Poush (generally December–January) and is one of the largest of its kind in Nepal.

== Health ==
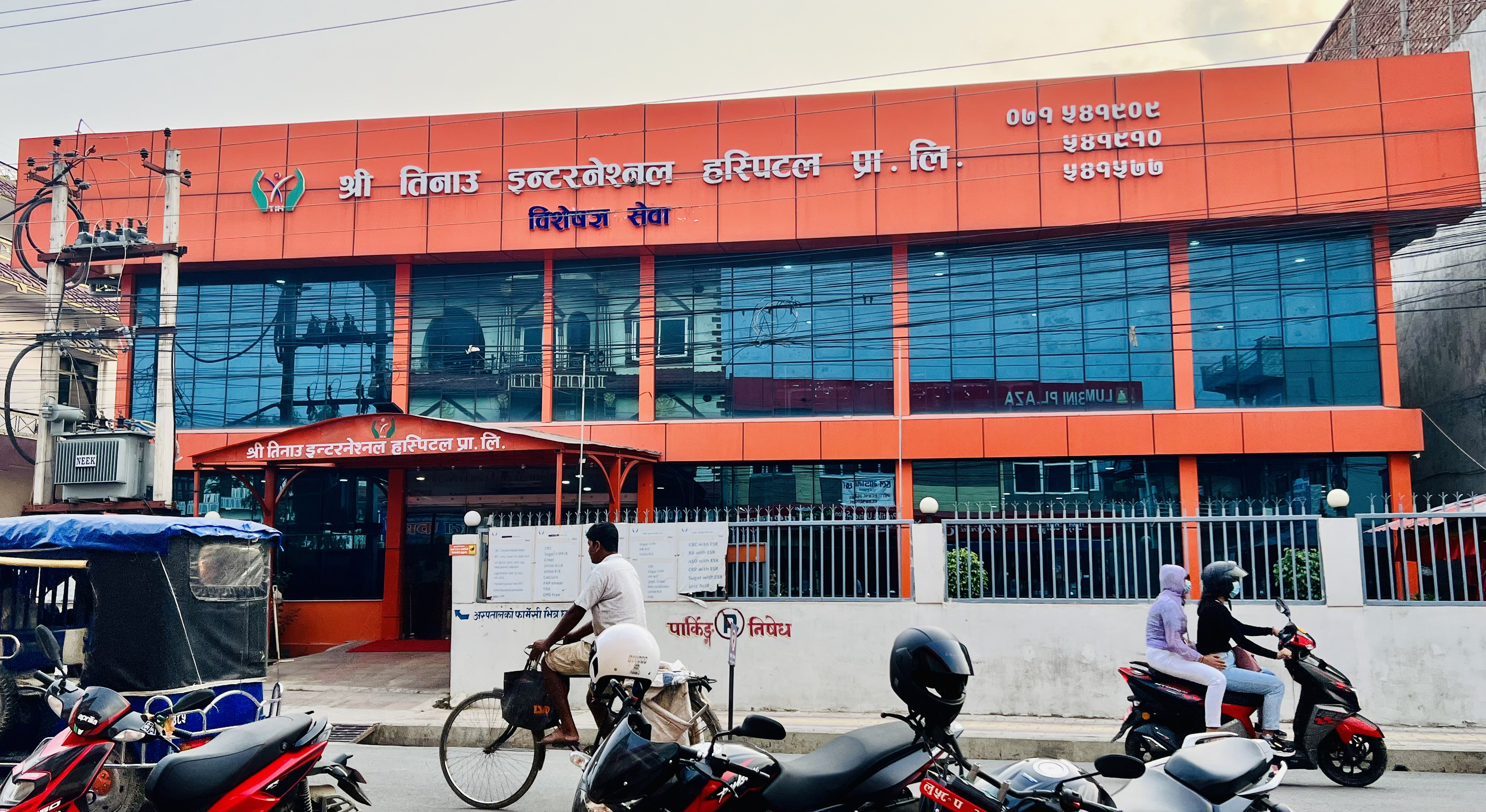
Tinau International Hospital in Sukkhanagar, Butwal

Butwal is home to Lumbini Provincial Hospital, one of the oldest hospitals in this region, which is considered a crucial resource for healthcare to poor citizens who cannot afford private hospitals. Originally established by Chandra Sumsher, the present hospital came in operation in 2020 BS (1963–1964) with 50 beds. Patients from far-western regions and hilly regions to the north including Palpa, Gulmi, Arghakhanchi come to seek specialized care at different hospitals in the city.

== Transport ==
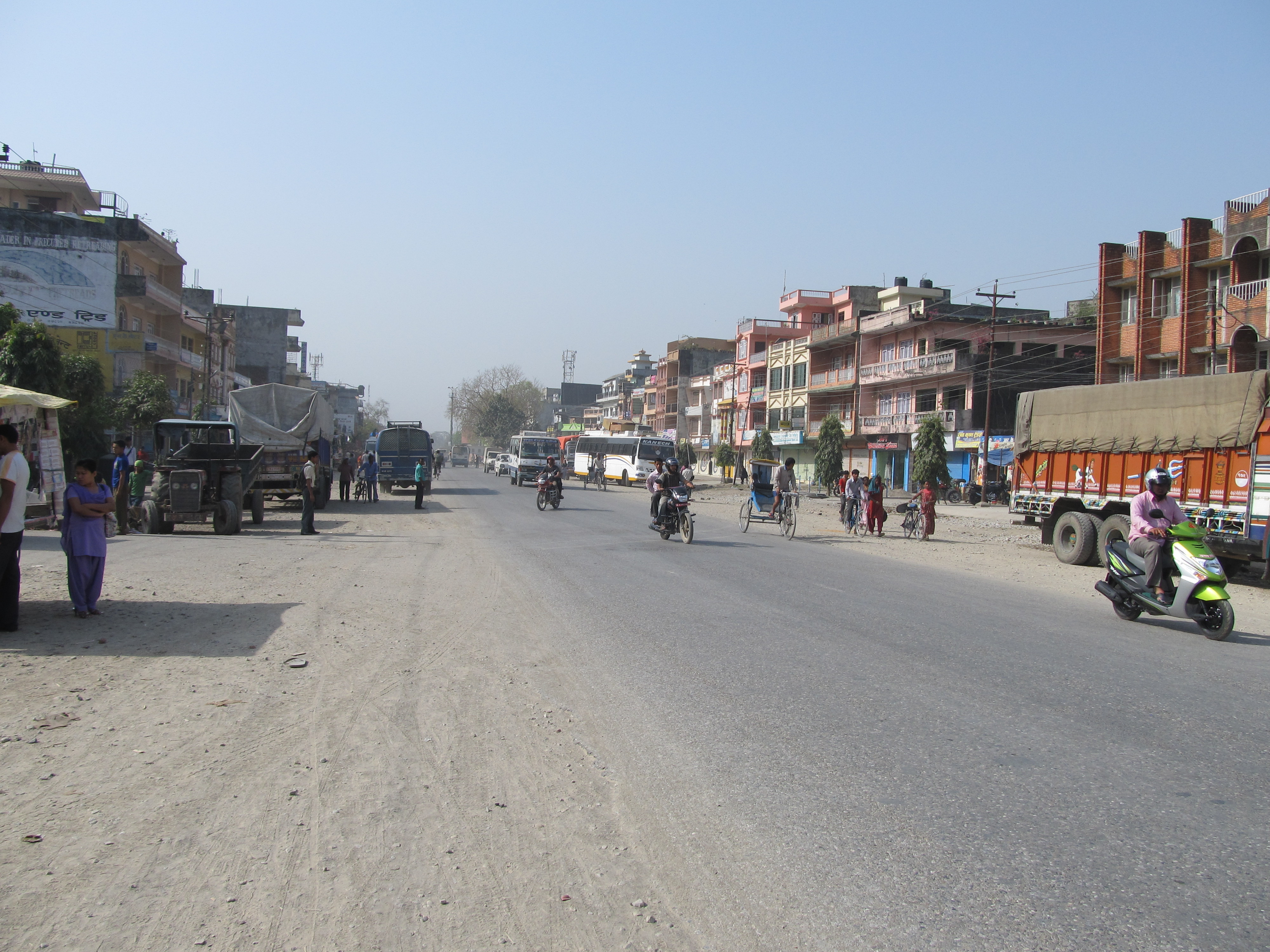
The Mahendra Rajmarg (East-West-Highway) is an important thoroughfare in Butwal

This city dominates any other city in terms of the number of bus services in Nepal. Until 2003, most of the fleet was older large buses; since then operators have added newer minibuses popularly called micro. Older jeeps are used to take people to nearby hilly regions. Rickshaws are used for short-distance urban transport. Motorcycles are a common means of personal transportation around town. The number registered has increased from 1,200 in 1999 to 80,000 in 2008.

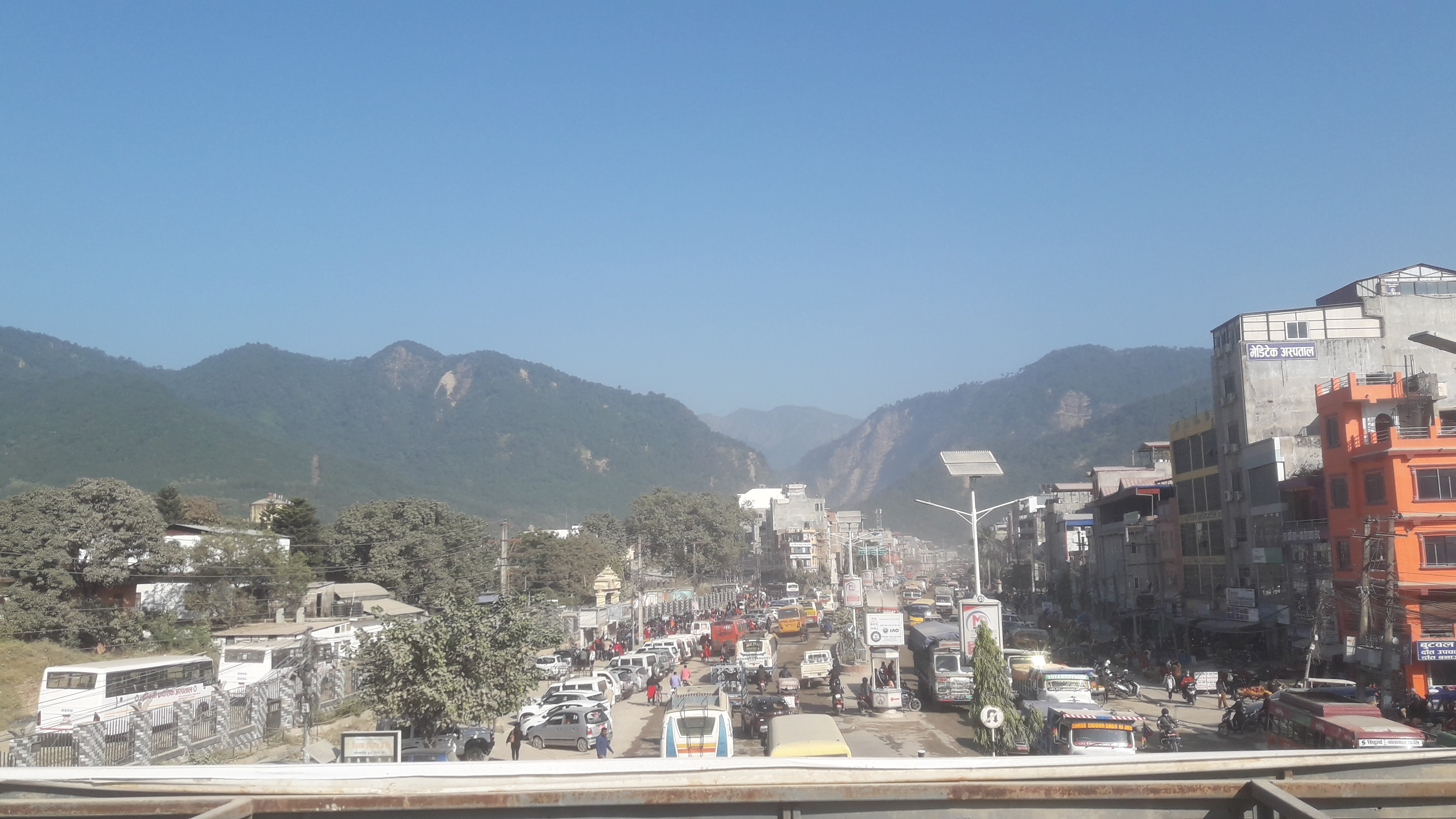
Movement of Transport Vehicles on Butwal Road

Nearly 100 buses depart everyday to Kathmandu from Butwal Bus Terminal. Besides the capital Kathmandu, the bus services are also frequently available to other major cities of Pokhara, Dharan, Kakarbhitta, Janakpur, Birgunj, Hetauda, Bharatpur, Tansen, Siddharthanagar, Dang, Nepalgunj, Dhangadi, and Mahendranagar.

== Education ==
Butwal is set to be an educational hub in the Rupandehi district. The literacy rate in the city is considered to be high. It has held the record for Nepal Top students in SLC as well as the HSEB examination numerous time

- Butwal Bahumukhi Campus, Golpark
- Eden English Boarding School, Naharpur
- Kanti Higher Secondary School, Haatbazar Line
- Butwal Technical Institute, Golpark

A study conducted showed that 40.8% of the people have an undergraduate degree in the city, while 30.4 percent up the people have up to secondary education (grade 10). And another 14.8% of the people hold a postgraduate degree.

== Places of interest ==
- Devdaha - A municipality in Rupandehi District of Nepal, the ancient capital of Koliya Kingdom, located 7 km east of Lumbini and east of Butwal and shares a border with Nawalparasi district on the east side. It is identified as the maternal home of Queen Mayadevi, Prajapati Gautami and Princess Yasodhara. Shitalnagar Khairani, Bhawanipur, Bairimai, Kan yamai, Khayardanda are some sites for visitors.
- Gajedi Taal - A lake located about 21 km west of Butwal. Lausha village of Gajedi VDC. A few hillocks and landscapes make it more artistic and adventurous. It is well known as a spot for picnics, gatherings, and boating in the lake.
- Jitgadi - A fortress during Angol Nepal war, Narayan temple built by (1864 B.S.) Hanuman temple and Shivalaya of Hanumagngadhi, Jalabinayak M9ehadev temple, Narayan Temple, Siddababa temple, Nuwakot, etc. are centers of attraction in Butwal.
- Murgiya Jharbaira (Bolbom Dham) - is about 13 km west from Butwal city centre. The Temple of Lord Shiva (Parroha Parmeshower Bolbam Dham) is situated here and is a holy site for Hindu Followers.
- Manimukunda Sen Park (Phulbari) - The winter palace of Palpali Sen clan. There are ruins and antiquities of the palace of Manimukunda Sen, an ancient Palpali king, containing 6 large rooms as well as a royal residence, administrative, and grandeur of Butwal. Siddharthanagar and other neighboring villages of Rupandehi district can be seen from here at night. His Majesty's Government, the archaeological department has attempted to maintain it since 1991. Now, Butwal municipality has formed a council for the conservation of Manimukunda Sen Park to conduct the Phulbari Development Programme and attempt to make it a tourist resort.
- Sainamaina - Located about 12 km. west from Butwal and to North from Banakatti, Sainamaina is an open museum. Among the different Gramas villages of Shakya King, it was in the samgrama site. An Indian queen (Begum Hazrat Mahal of Awadh) came to this area with her soldiers and porters (‘Sena’ and Mena’) because of the British disturbance in her kingdom and finally, this area came to be known as Saina Maina. It is a treasure trove of ancient ruins and antiquities: statues of dancing saints, ruins of palace, well etc.
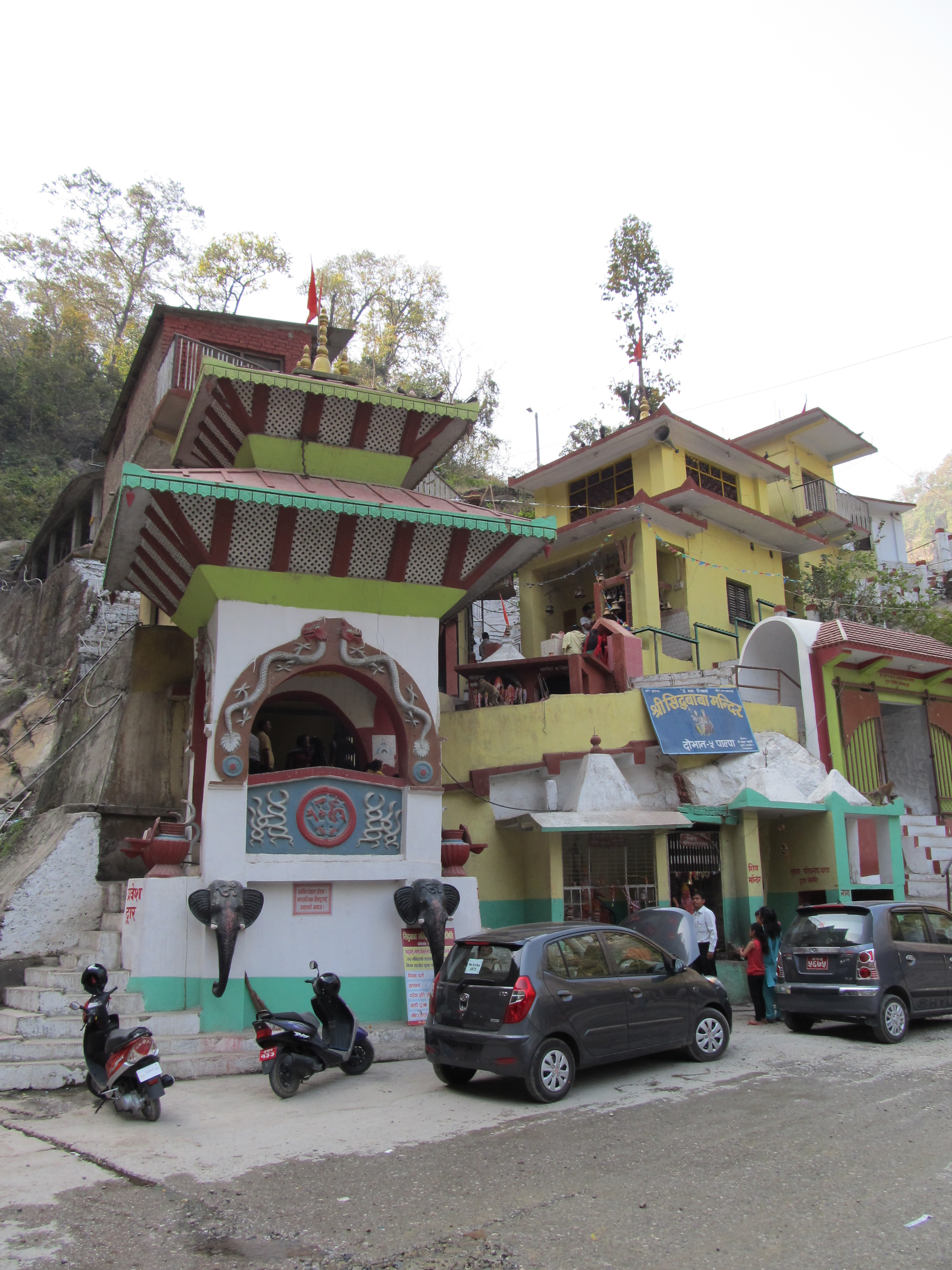
  Siddha Baba Temple
- Siddha Baba Temple - Lies on the outskirts of Butwal Sub-Metro, in Palpa District. The area near this temple is prone to landslides. The temple is overcrowded by devotees during the festival of Shiva Ratri, Nepali New Year (Bikram Sambat-B.S), and weekends. (See photo)
- Banbatika Forest Resort - This is a kind of forest park opened for locals which lie in the Tilottama Municipality adjacent to Butwal Sub-Metropolitan. Usually known for picnic spots and a small zoo for visitors and Research Centre.
- Lumbini - The Birthplace of Gautama Buddha. The Mecca for Buddhist followers in Nepal & all over the world. Lumbini is situated 40 km south-west of Butwal and is known as the birthplace of Lord Gautam Buddha.
- Padma Chaitya Bihar a century old Buddhist monastery in the right bank of Tinau River.

== Climate ==
Climate data for Butwal
Month	Jan	Feb	Mar	Apr	May	Jun	Jul	Aug	Sep	Oct	Nov	Dec	Year
Average precipitation mm (inches)	16.4 (0.65)	16.7 (0.66)	21.9 (0.86)	22.8 (0.90)	93.5 (3.68)	392.5 (15.45)	704.9 (27.75)	598.8 (23.57)	409.7 (16.13)	110.5 (4.35)	9.6 (0.38)	12.0 (0.47)	2,409.3 (94.85)
Source: Japan International Cooperation Agency

== Notable people ==
- Bishnu Prasad Paudel, Deputy Prime Minister of Nepal and Member of Parliament
- Cool Pokhrel, Singer and musician
- Surakshya Panta, Model and actress
- Birendra Agrahari, Singer
- Kushal Bhurtel, National Cricket player
- Kushal Malla, National Cricket player
- Rahul Vishwakarma, National Cricket player
- Basanta Thapa, National Football Player

== Events ==
- Tillotama Gold Cup is a national level football championship held annually in Butwal

== See also ==
- Shrawan Danda, neighbourhood in Butwal city affected by landslide
- Kathmandu
- Pokhara
- Sunwal
- Biratnagar
- Dharan
- Birgunj
- Bhairahawa
- Bharatpur, Nepal
