= Motipur, Rupandehi =

Coordinates: 27°40′N 83°26′E

Motipur मोतीपुर
- Village Development Committee
- Interactive map of Motipur
- Country: Nepal
- Province: Lumbini Province
- District: Rupandehi District

Population (1991)
  - Total: 5,601
- Time zone: UTC+5:45 (Nepal Time)

Motipur is a Village Development Committee in Rupandehi District in Lumbini Province of southern Nepal. At the time of the 1991 Nepal census it had a population of 5601 people residing in 927 individual households. It is now combined with Butwal municipality to form Butwal sub-metropolitan city.
