= Siwalik region =

Region in Nepal

Siwalik is a highland region between the Mahabharat and Chure mountain ranges in Nepal.

The region has huge deposits of calcium carbonate and of important minerals such as iron, sulfur, and copper; the deposits however, are generally of sub-economic grades that currently are not worth exploiting. The Siwalik Hills are regarded as the most tectonically dynamic zone of the Himalaya, the region is uplifting at a rate of 3–4 mm per year. This is consistent with an uplift rate of approximately 3–4 kilometres per million years, which in turn implies that the formation is geologically young and tectonically exceptionally active; the underlying rocks are therefore weak and easily eroded. The hills extend in a narrow east-west belt, only some 15–20 km in width, which marks the northern boundary of the plains of Terai and the southern boundary of Middle-hill Mountains.

The region is important for two reasons in particular. Firstly, it is the prime source of sediments for the plain of Terai — torrents flowing down the steep gradients erode material from the fragile rock and transport it downstream. The streams slow down as they flow onto the plain, and in consequence they deposit their burden of silt, thereby filling or clogging the streambeds and raising their levels. This aggravates flooding problems in the plains. On the positive side, however, the silt replenishes the nutrient content of the soil of the downstream lowland plains, which produce more than 80% of Nepal's food production.

The second important aspect of the significance of the Siwalik region and associated concerns, is that it supports dense sub-tropical forest. Deforestation is increasing in consequence of demands for timber, firewood, and litter from the local population. In spite of its protective cover of vegetation, the Siwalik is subject to severe erosion that creates gullies and promotes landslides. This is partly because of the crumbly texture of its pedology and partly because of the intensity of the regional rainfall. The effects of tectonic uplift may also contribute to the problem, but studies to establish their contribution currently are inadequate. The erosion is of primary concern, both as the main source of sediments and of associated hazards such as debris flows, and the progression of erosion is accelerating the decrease and degradation of the forest resources.

Siwalik rocks are the upper tertiary rocks which are exposed in himalayan foothill zone extending from hardwar in UP to Assam. These are also described as Siwalik group.
