= Tinau =

Coordinates: 27°45′N 83°31′E

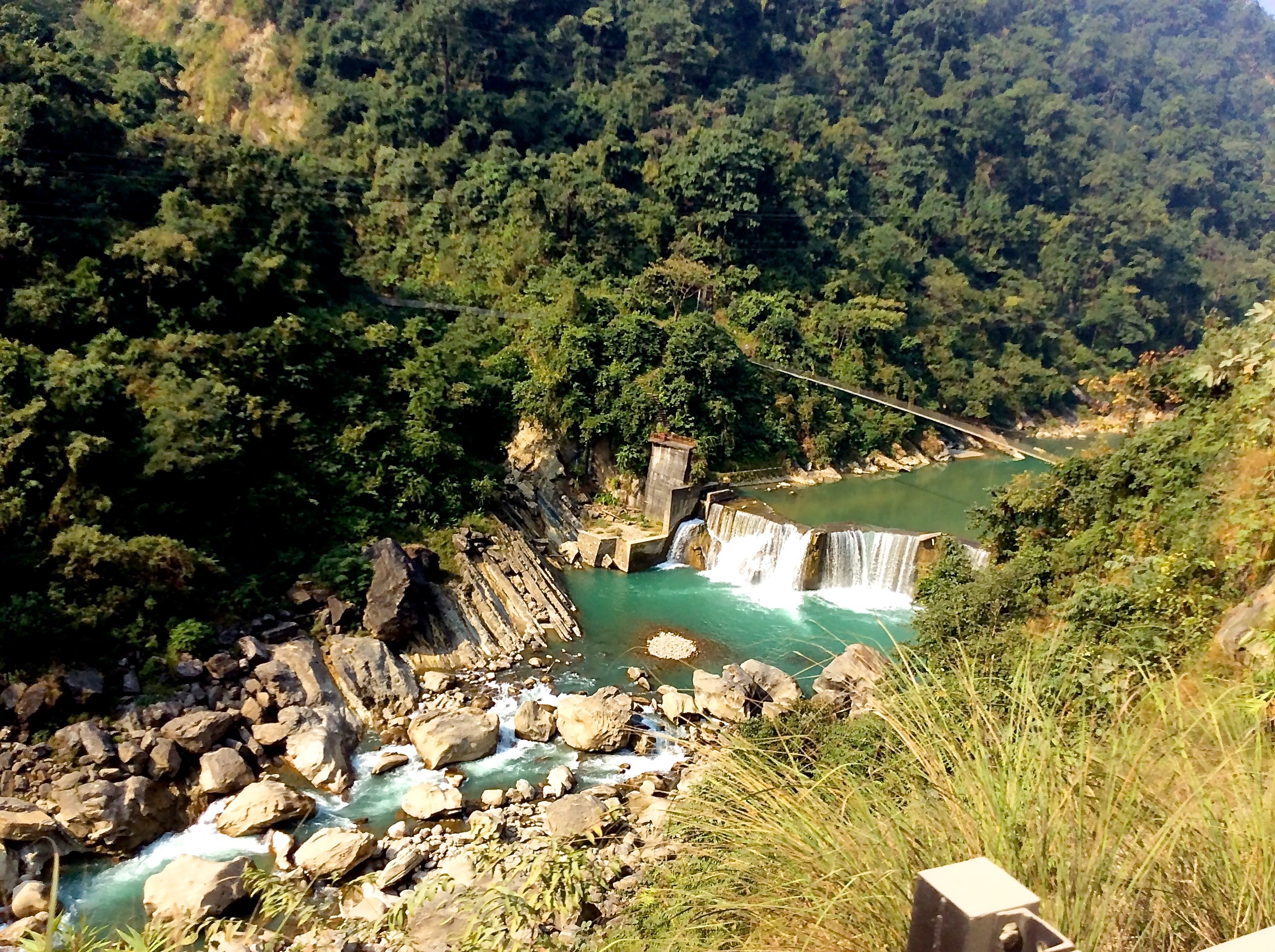
- Native name: तिनाउ (Nepali)

Location
- Country: Nepal
- Region: Lumbini Province
- District: Rupendehi, Palpa
- Municipality: Butwal

Physical characteristics
- Source: Churia Range
  - location: Palpa, Nepal
  - elevation: 300 m (980 ft)
- Mouth
  - location: Palpa
- Length: 95 km (59 mi)
- Discharge
  - minimum: 2.2 m^{3}/s (78 cu ft/s)
  - maximum: 2,500 m^{3}/s (88,000 cu ft/s)

Basin features
- Tributaries
  - left: Chidiya Khola
  - right: Dovan Khola

The Tinau is a river originating from the Mahabharat Mountains and flowing through the Siwalik Hills and Terai Plain at Butwal, Nepal before joining the Ganges.

== River morphology ==
The main stem of the Tinau River originates at an altitude of 1300m. The length of the Tinau is 95 km starting from Palpa to Indo-Nepal Border at Marchawar. The catchment area of the river is about 1081 sq. km up to the border of which 412 km^{2} (41200 ha.) are in the Terai and 669 km2 of mountainous area.

== River flow ==
The minimum flow of the river is about 2.2 m3/s in April while the calculated 100 years return period flow in 2500m3/s.

The maximum recorded flow at DHM station no 390 is as follows:

View chart definition.

Year	Maximum Flow (m3/s)
1964	417
1965	2200
1966	1180
1967	1950
1968	2000
1969	600
1984	390
1985	325
1986	644
1987	580
1988	565
1989	457
1990	260
1991	288
1992	134

== Floods ==
1981

In 1981, there was a huge flood that destroyed two suspension bridges and the powerhouse shaft of Himal Hydro.

2007

In the flood of 2007 at least 500 households of Butwal municipality were displaced.

2008

In 2008, due to outburst of embankment, about 250 households were displace in Butwal municipality due to the flood.

== Water use ==
=== Hydropower ===
Tinau Hydropower Plant
