= Gajedi =

Gajedi गजेडी
- Village development committee
- Location in Nepal
- Coordinates: 27.65°N 83.29°E
- Country: Nepal
- Province: Lumbini Province
- District: Rupandehi District

Population (1991)
  - Total: 7,751
- Time zone: UTC+5:45 (Nepal Time)

Gajedi is a village development committee in Rupandehi District in Lumbini Province of southern Nepal. At the time of the 1991 Nepal census it had a population of 7751 people living in 1310 individual households. This place is near Lumbini, the birthplace of Gautama Buddha. It is also known for the scenic Gajedi Lake.
