= Gajedi Taal =

Lake in Nepal

- गजेडी ताल (Nepali)
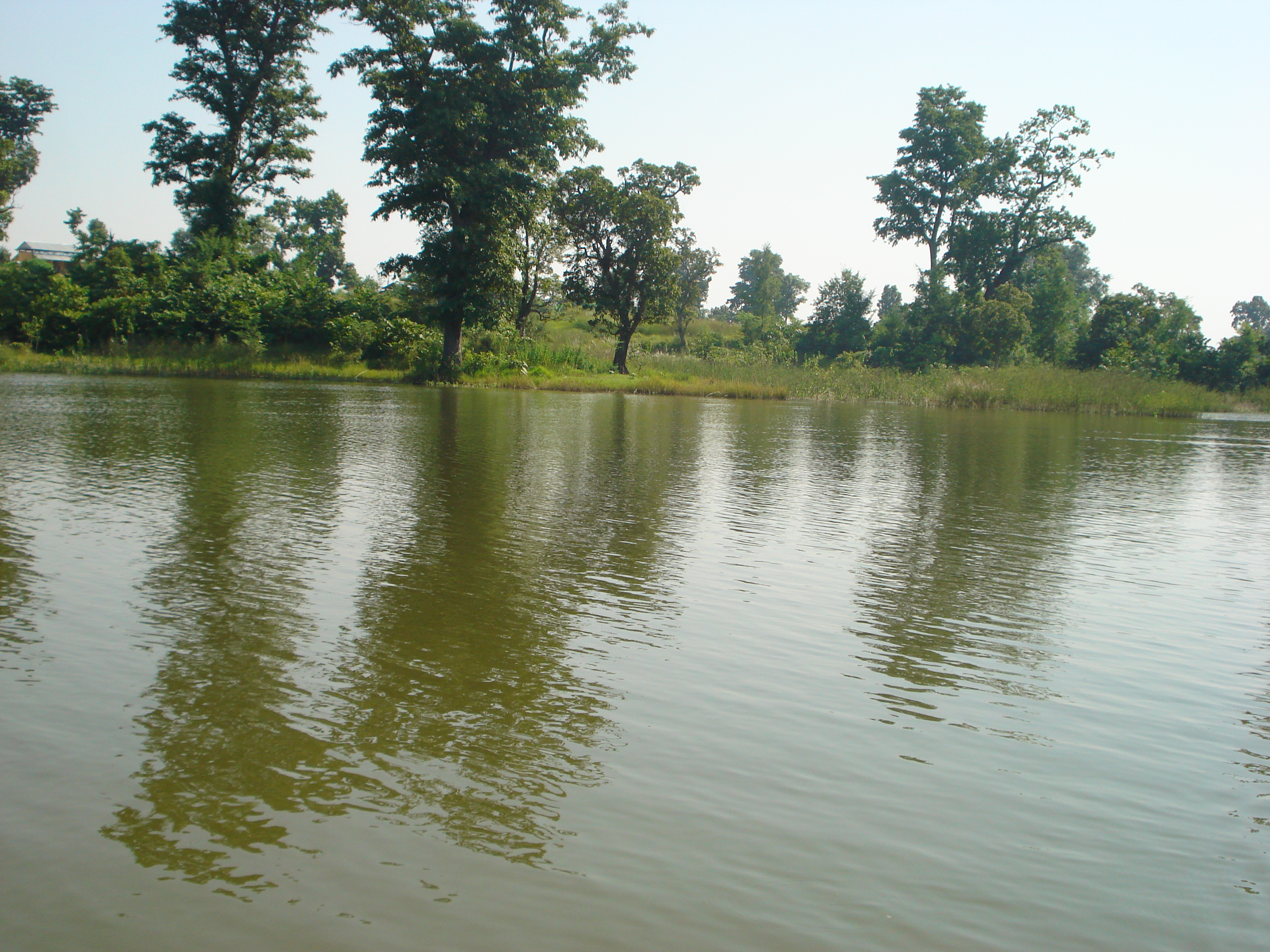
- View of Gajedi Taal

- Location within Nepal
- Location: Danapur-Kuchira, Nepal
- Coordinates: 27°39.74′N 83°16.55′E
- Type: lake

Gajedi Taal is a lake in Gajedi village of southern Nepal spreads over 4.5 km^{2} (1.7 sq mi) and is surrounded by forest. It lies just 3 km (1.9 mi) south of Mahendra Highway.

== Location ==
Gajedi Taal is located in Kanchan Rural Municipality, previously Gajedi VDC.

== See also ==
- List of lakes of Nepal
