= Siddhartha Highway =

Road in Nepal

Siddhartha Highway सिद्धार्थ राजमार्ग
- राष्ट्रिय राजमार्ग ४७
- National Highway 47
- Siddhartha Highway in red

Route information
- Maintained by MoPIT (Department of Roads)
- Length: 182 km (113 mi)

Major junctions
- From: Belahiya, Nepal
- To: Pokhara, Nepal

Location
- Country: Nepal

Highway system
- Roads in Nepal
← NH46	→ NH48

Siddhartha Highway (Nepali: सिद्धार्थ राजमार्ग), or NH47 (previously: H10) is a major highway in Nepal that connects the Terai region in southern Nepal with the mountain region in northern Nepal. The highway starts at the Nepal–India border near Siddharthanagar and terminates at Pokhara. It intersects with the east–west Mahendra Highway at Butwal.

Construction of the highway was started in 1964 and completed in 1971. It was inaugurated by King Birendra on 9 May 1972 (25 Baisakh 2029 BS) in Pokhara. Built with Indian financial assistance, the highway consists of about 34 bridges with the longest bridge over the Kali Gandaki River in Ramdi. The highway takes its name from Siddhartha Gautam (Gautama Buddha).

== Route description ==
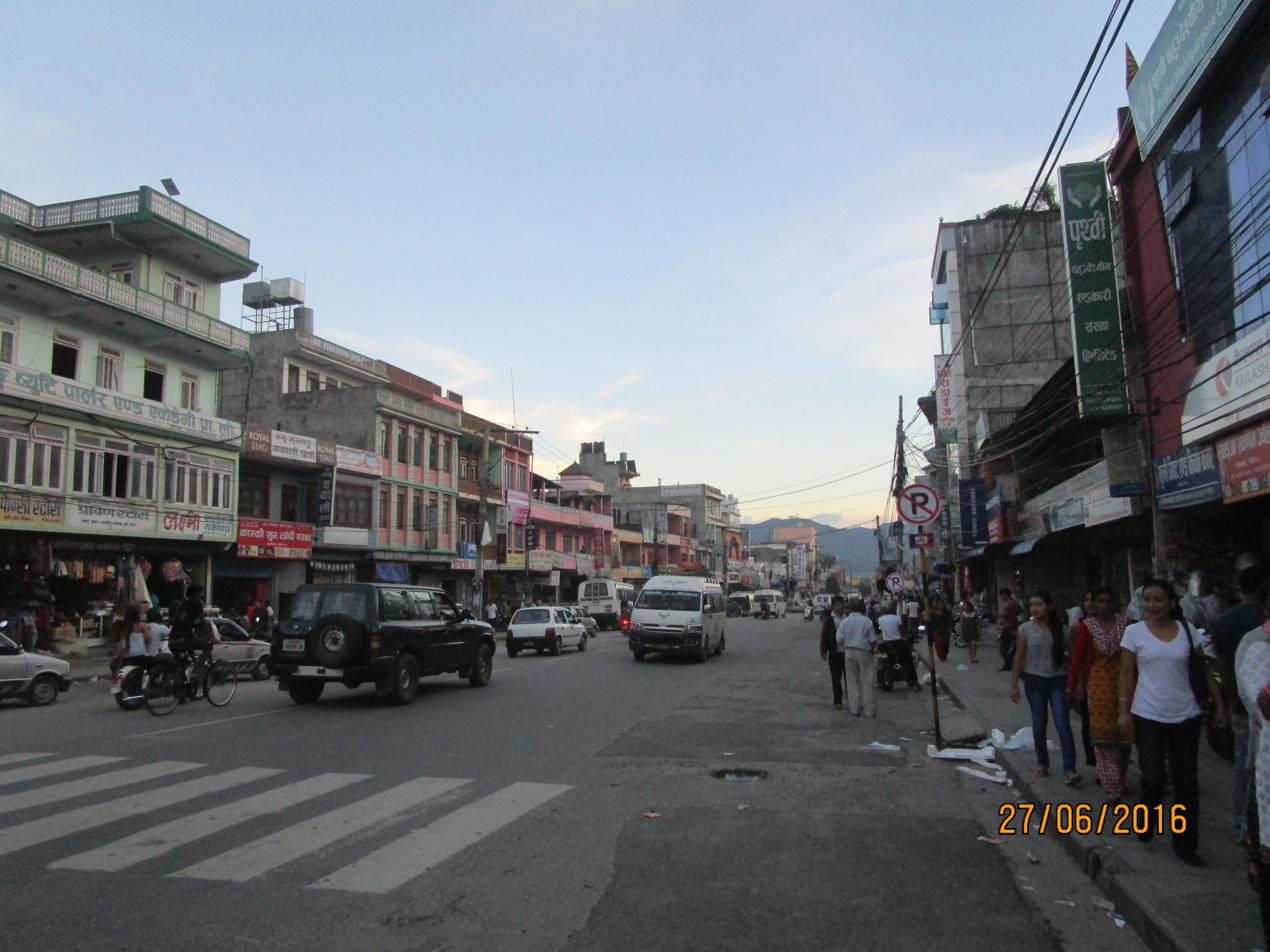
Siddhartha Highway

The length of the highway is 181 kilometres (112 mi). The major settlements on the highway are Siddharthanagar, Butwal, Tansen, Waling, Putalibazar, Syangja and Pokhara.

The Butwal–Palpa section of this road consists of rocky terrain and frequent rock-fall which sometimes causes fatal accidents.

The road is considered among the five busiest highways in Nepal. It is mainly used for transportation of food and agricultural products. People who want to travel to Pokhara generally do not use this highway because of the large number of narrow curves and the poor quality of the road.

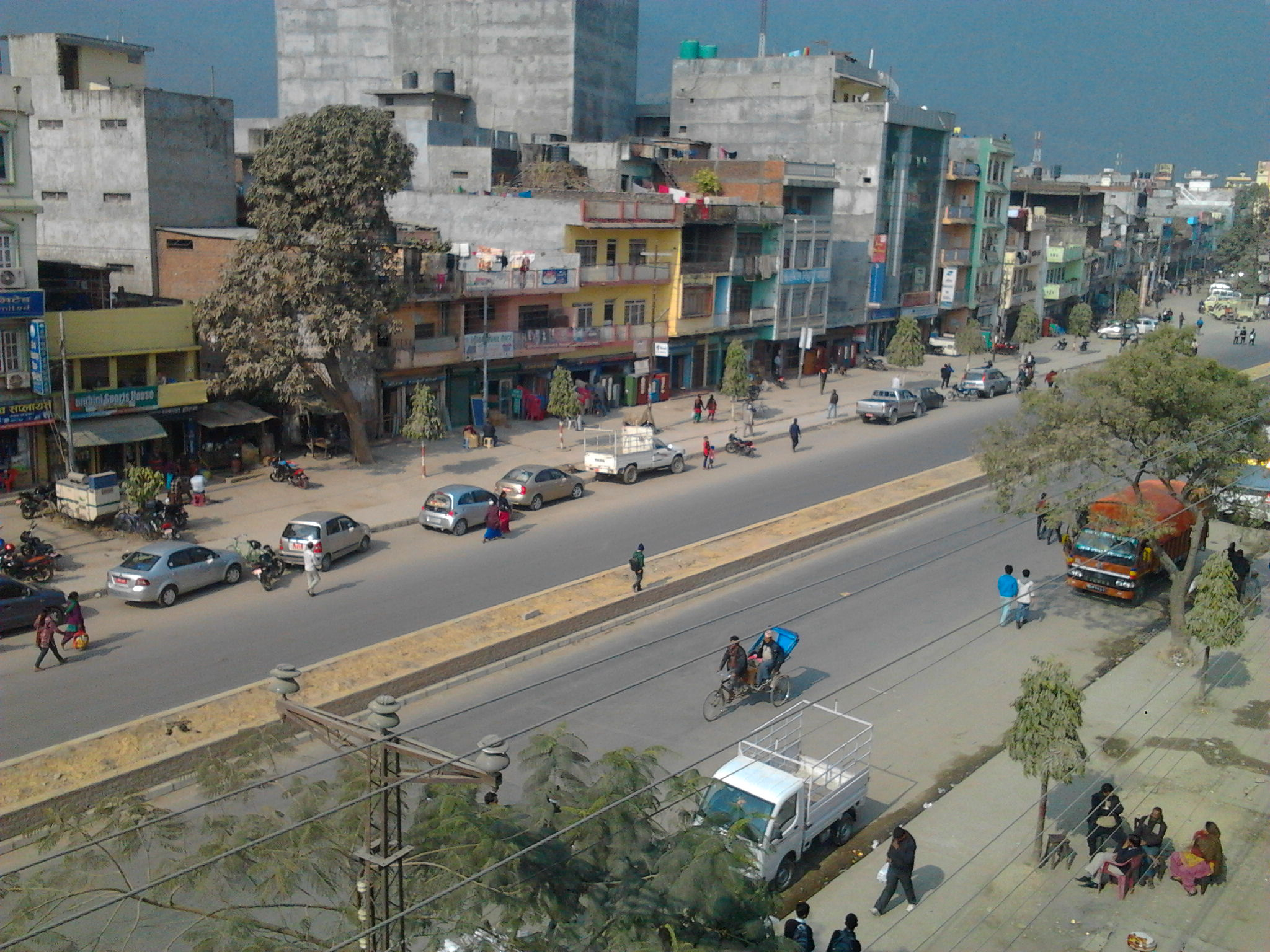
Butwal

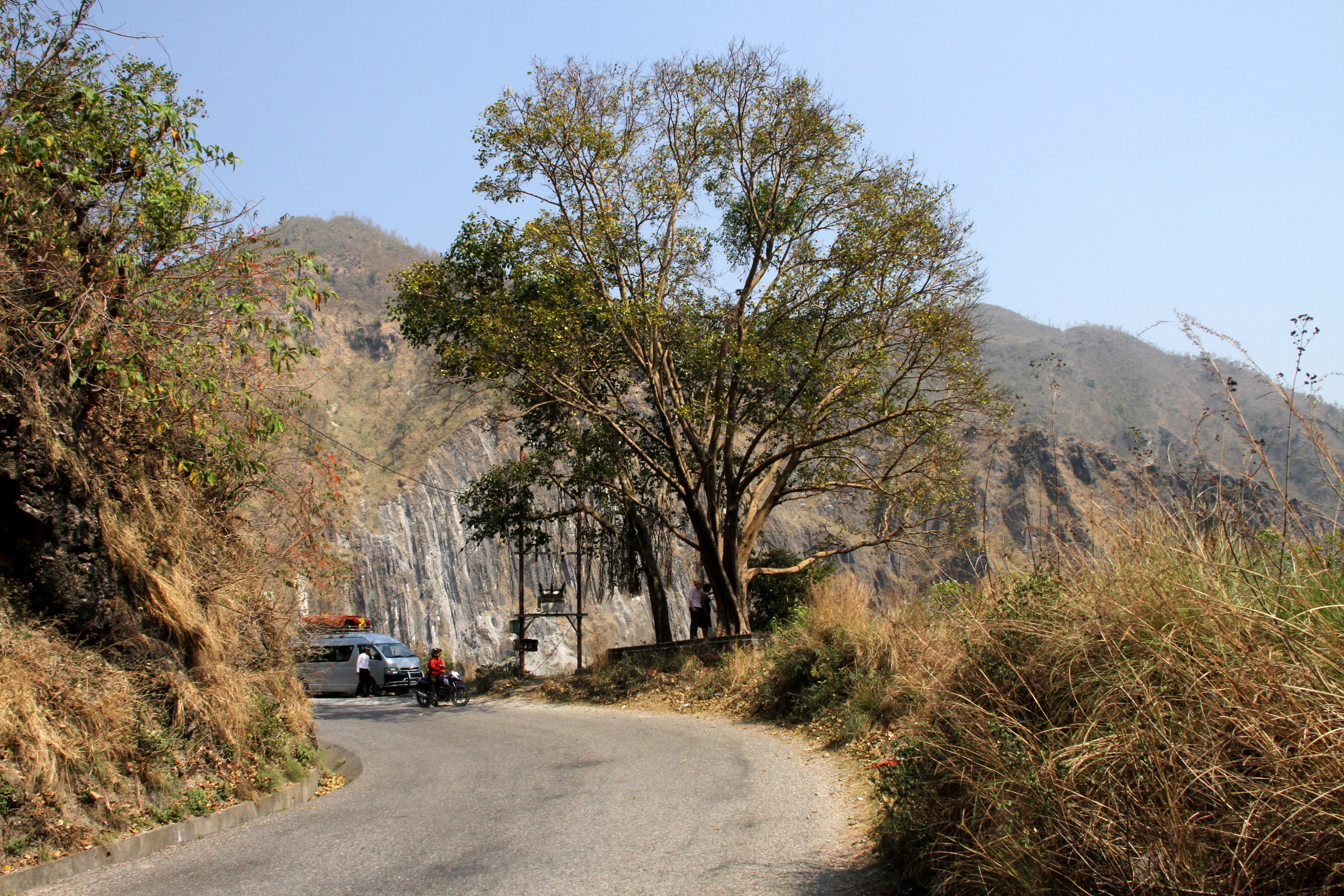
Near Tansen

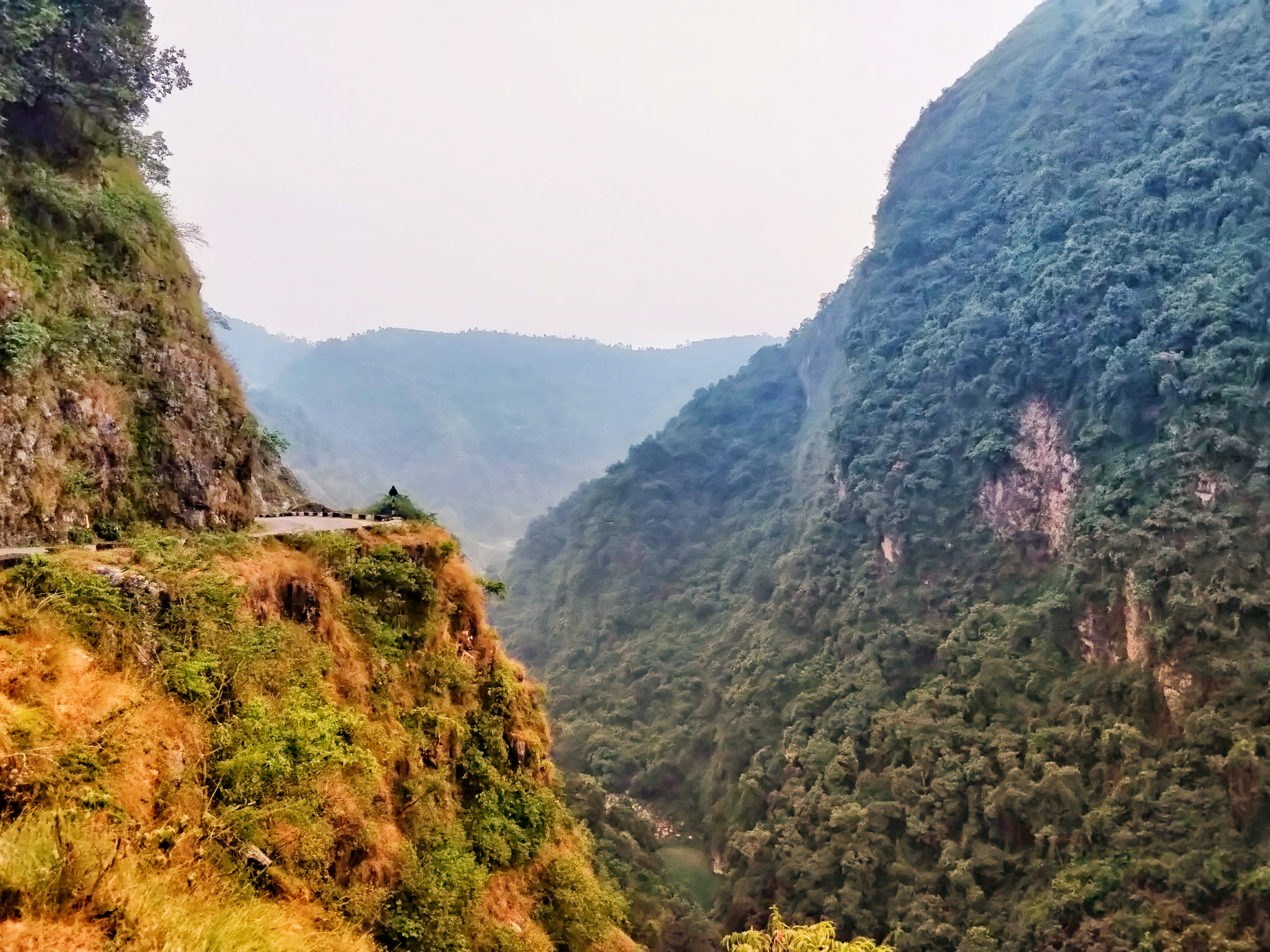
Near Galyang

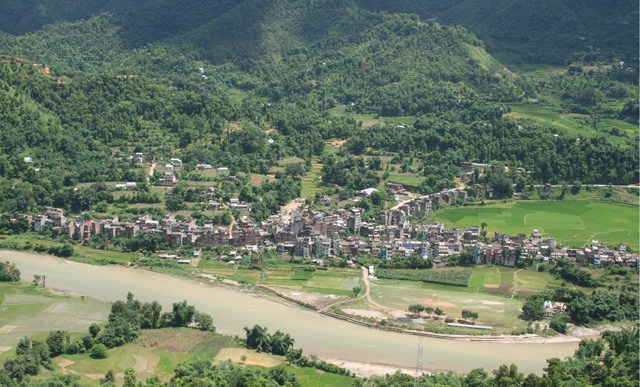
Waling

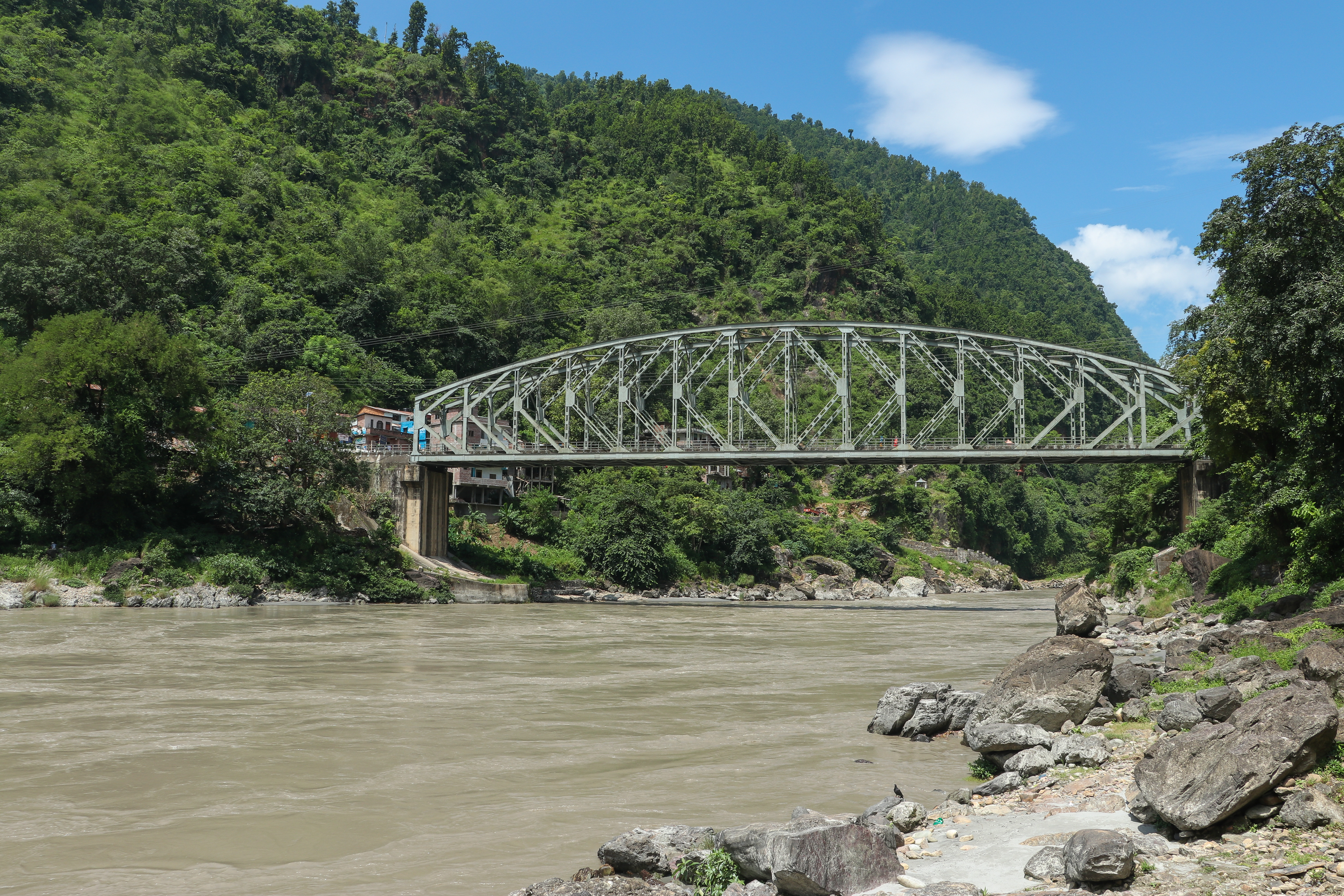
Bridge over Kaligandaki river

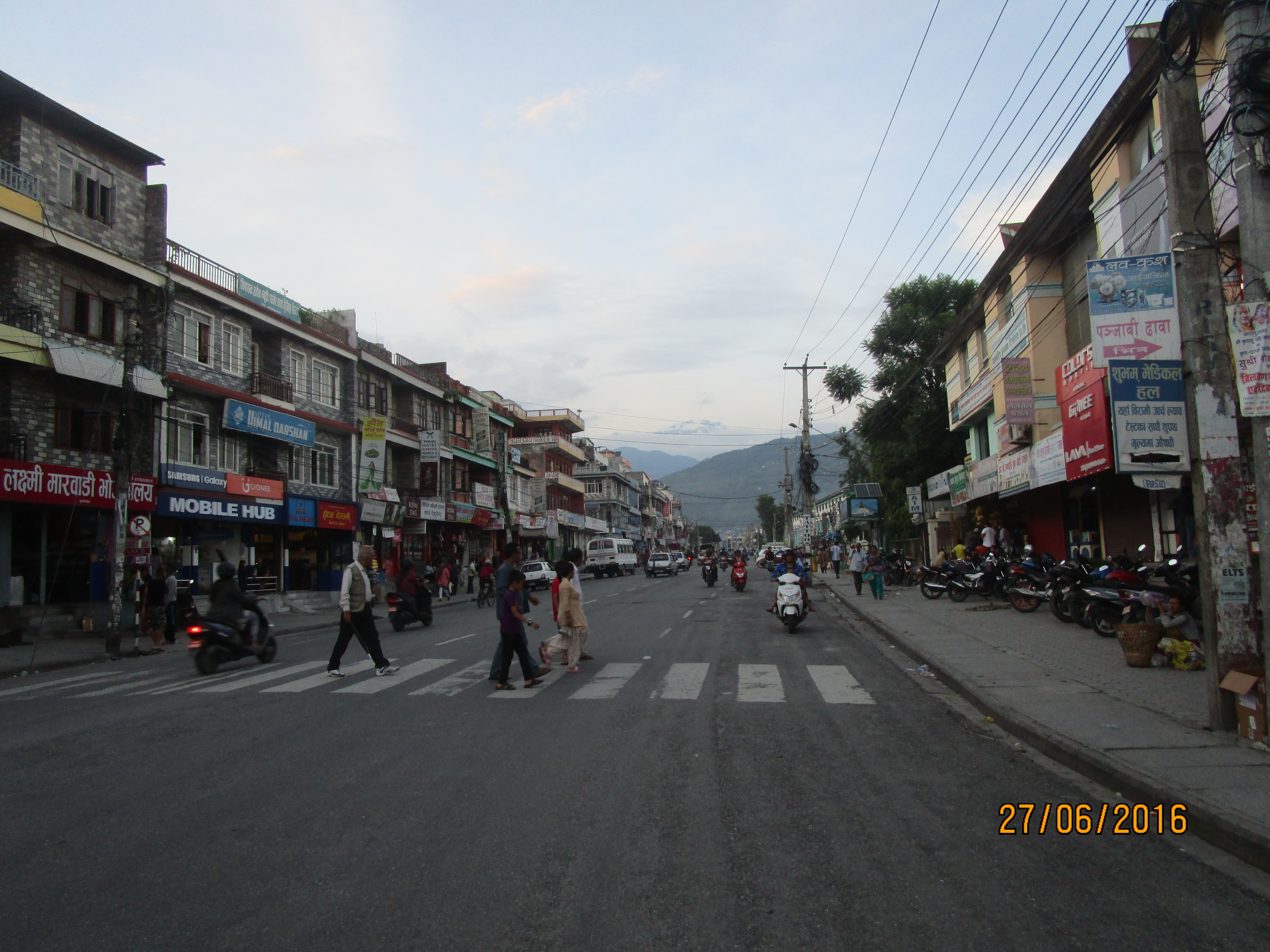
Pokhara

== See also ==
- List of national highways in Nepal
