= Christianity in Nepal =

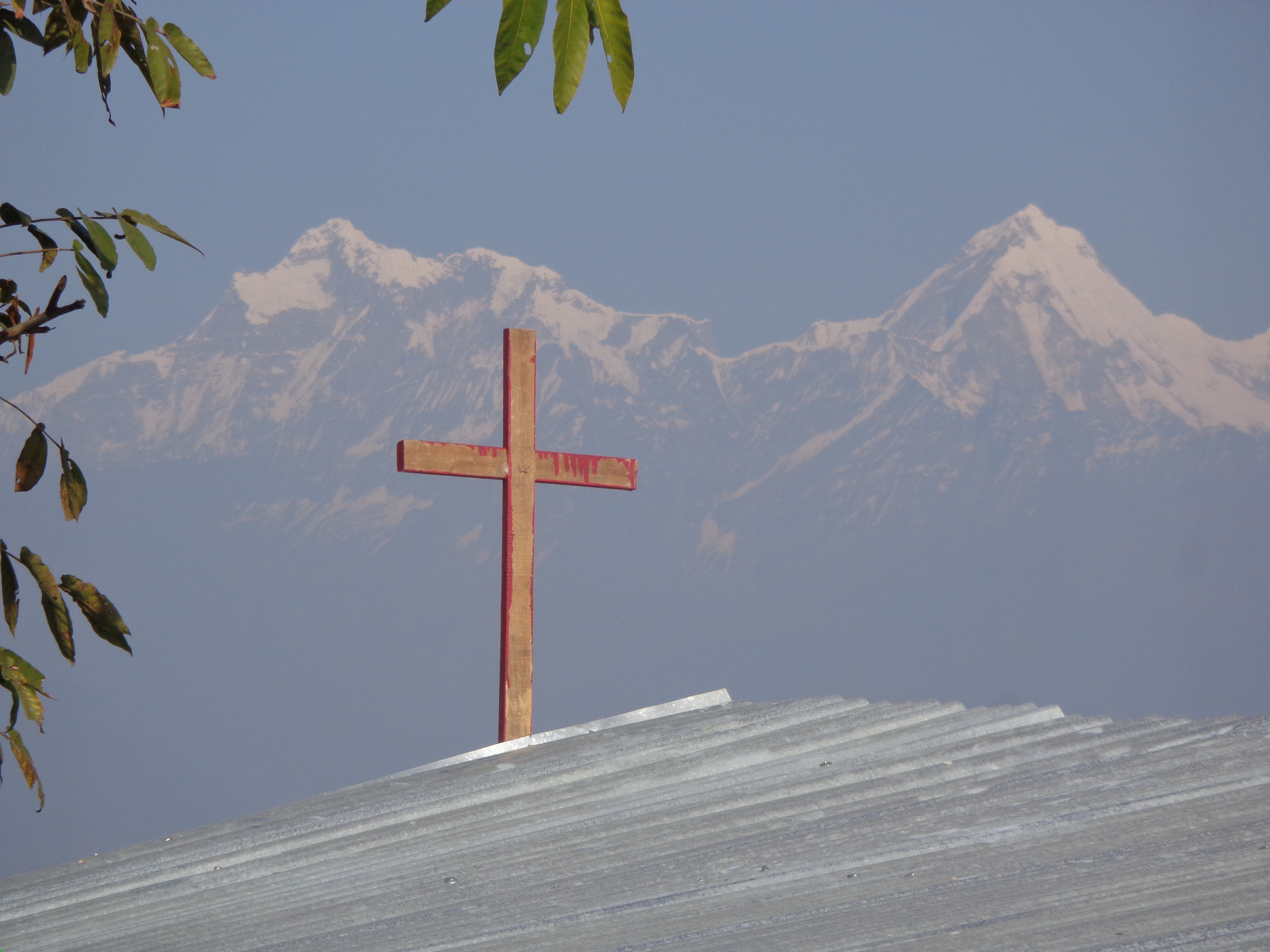
A Nepali church

Christianity is, according to the 2021 census, the fifth most practiced religion in Nepal, with 512,313 adherents or 1.8%, up from 2011 when there were 375,699 adherents or 1.4% of the population. Many informed observers have estimated that there are at least 1 million Nepali Christians. According to some Christian groups, there may be as many as 3 million Christians in Nepal, constituting up to 10% of the country's population. A report by Gordon Conwell Theological Seminary identified the Nepali church the fastest growing in the world. The vast majority of Nepali Christians are evangelical Protestants (if evangelical is defined broadly to include charismatics and Pentecostals); there is also a small Catholic population of roughly 10,000.

The first Christian mission to Nepal was established in 1715 by Catholic Capuchin friars, who worked in the Kathmandu Valley. The Capuchins were expelled following Nepal's unification in 1768–69, and Christian groups were officially banned from the country for the next two centuries. After the revolution of 1951, foreign missionaries were permitted to enter Nepal to perform social service work, but proselytization and conversion were still legally prohibited. It was only after the introduction of multi-party democracy in 1990, and the relaxation of restrictions on conversion, that the Nepali church began to grow rapidly, but attempts to convert others remain illegal as of 2023.

The expansion of Christianity is a controversial subject in Nepal, and Nepali Christians have been subject to sporadic violence and widespread social exclusion. It is frequently reported in Nepali media and political discourse that missionaries offer the poor material incentives to convert, like what's happening in India, but research has indicated that most Nepali Christians convert for reasons other than contact with missionaries.

Nepal's constitution-writing process of 2006–2015, and the 2007 designation of the country as a secular state, intensified controversies surrounding Christianity. The constitution of 2015 re-affirmed secularism but also prohibited proselytism and "disturbing the religion of other people". In 2017, Nepal's parliament passed a bill which prohibited "hurting the religious sentiment of any caste, ethnic community or class by writing, through voice/talk or by a shape or symbol or in any other such manner".

Historical Christianity population in Nepal
Year	Pop.	±%
2001	104,180	—
2011	375,699	+260.6%
2021	512,313	+36.4%
Source: Nepal Censuses

== History ==
=== The Capuchin mission ===
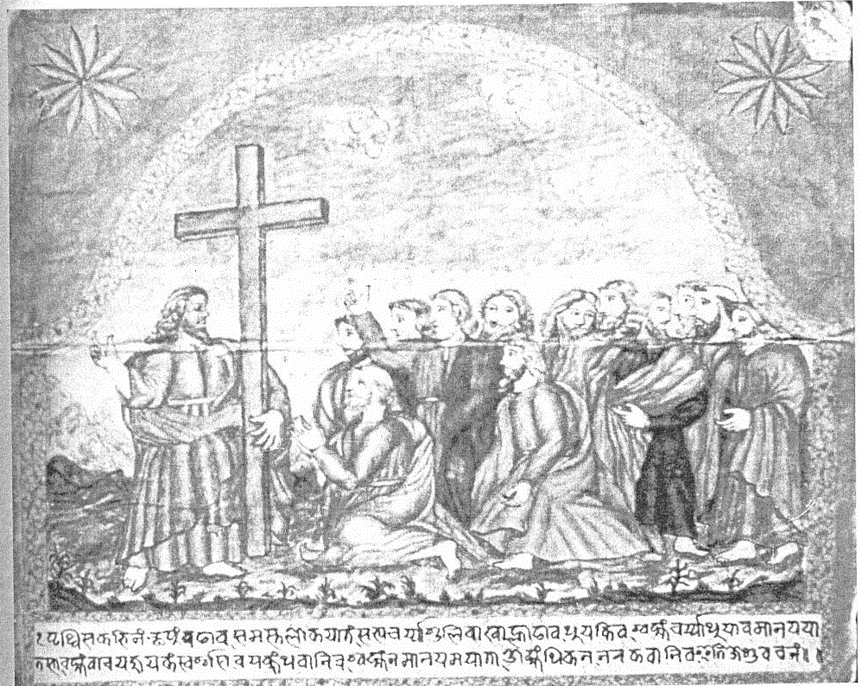
Frontispiece of "Satya Sakshi Parmesvarya Mahima" (1740), composed in Newar for King Ranajit Malla by Capuchin missionaries.

Catholic Capuchin missionaries were given permission to reside in the Kathmandu Valley in 1715. They worked in each of the valley's three city-states, and eventually made their main base in Bhaktapur, where they settled in 1740. The Capuchins were surprised by the warm welcome afforded to them by the king of Bhaktapur, Ranajit Malla, who, one wrote, "embraced us all affectionately and treated us with great familiarity and confidence; he made us sit at his side and kept us for more than an hour". The missionaries focused their activities on the royal court, and composed a treatise on monotheism for the king. Although he did not convert, the king did offer some of his subjects to be Christians in his stead. The Capuchins refused this offer, and, although they succeeded in making a small number of voluntary local converts, their mission was put to an end in 1769 after Prithvi Narayan Shah, the ruler of Gorkha, conquered the Kathmandu Valley and expelled all Christians from his new kingdom. The Newar Christians took refuge in India, settling first in the city of Bettiah and then later moving eleven kilometres north to Chuhari, where they reside to this day.

=== 1769–1951 ===
Ganga Prasad Pradhan (1851–1932)

Over the next 200 years, until 1951, Nepal was entirely closed to Christians, although small numbers of ethnically Nepali evangelists from India were able to cross the border surreptitiously. The most famous of these is Ganga Prasad Pradhan (1851–1932), a Newar raised in Darjeeling who is known as the first ordained Nepali pastor. Pradhan converted to Christianity while studying at a school run by Church of Scotland missionaries in Darjeeling. After forty years of ministry to the Nepali-speaking community in northern India, focused mainly on producing a Bible translation and other evangelistic materials in Nepali, he decided in 1914 to return with his family to Kathmandu to establish a Christian presence in Nepal. Travelling with a group of around forty people, Pradhan and his colleagues' presence was discovered by the authorities soon after they arrived in Kathmandu. They were firmly instructed to leave, being told: "there is no room for Christians in Nepal".

=== 1951–1990 ===
Dr James Dick and Jill Cook treating patients at the UMN dispensary at Okhaldhunga, in east Nepal, in the early 1960s

After the overthrow of the Rana regime in 1951, King Tribhuvan opened Nepal's borders and appealed to the outside world to assist in Nepal's development. A number of Christian missionary groups responded to this call. The largest such organisation was the United Mission to Nepal (UMN), founded in 1954 as a cooperative endeavor between eight Protestant denominations. The first projects of the mission were the foundation of medical facilities in Tansen in west Nepal and in the Kathmandu Valley near to Bhaktapur; the work soon expanded to include rural development, education, engineering, and the foundation of other medical facilities and hospitals. By 1990 the UMN "comprised 39 member missions, 420 expatriate missionaries, and over 2,000 Nepali staff". Due to a 2002 decision to hand over most major projects to local control, the size of UMN is currently much reduced from this level. The UMN's work in Nepal has been defined and limited by a series of five-year agreements with the Nepal government, which clearly prohibit proselytism.

The women's ward at INF's Green Pastures Hospital in Pokhara, during the 1960s

The other major Protestant missionary organization to enter Nepal after 1951 was the Nepal Evangelistic Band (NEB). Founded in 1943 by the doctor Lily O'Hanlon, the NEB worked with ethnically Nepali converts in northern India during the 1940s. In 1952 O'Hanlon and her colleagues were given permission to undertake medical work in Pokhara; they established 'The Shining Hospital', which became well known for the high quality of its treatment, and in 1957 opened the Green Pastures Hospital for the treatment of leprosy. The NEB would later change its name to the International Nepal Fellowship (INF), and expand its work into a range of medical and social justice activities. It currently has a staff of over 400 and operates according to agreements with the government similar to those of the UMN.

Pastor David and Premi Mukia

Unlike that in India and other countries which had been colonized, the Protestant church in Nepal was established under indigenous leadership, with a clear line of separation between the church and missionary organizations. David Mukhia and his wife Premi, who were ethnically Nepali Christians from India, established Ram Ghat church in Pokhara in 1952, which is generally known as Nepal's first church.

On April 8, 1953, a fellowship was established in the Putalisadak area by early evangelists Mr. C. K. Athially and Mr. C. G. George, which subsequently developed into the Bethshalom Putalisadak Church. It stands as the first church established within the Kathmandu Valley. Distinguishing itself over the decades by adhering strictly to an indigenous church model, the congregation transitioned towards total local self-governance, financial independence from foreign mission boards, and contextualized cultural worship practices.

Tir Bahadur Dewan and his wife Ratan, also Nepalis who had lived in India, established a fellowship in Bhaktapur in 1954. In 1957 a group of Nepali Christians from Kalimpong, led by Robert Karthak, Rajendra Kumar Rongong and including Gyaani Shah and Elizabeth Franklin, established a fellowship in Kathmandu, later known as Nepal Isai Mandali. This would eventually become one of the largest churches in Nepal. From the 1960s, Christians encountered increasing legal problems, with prosecutions being brought for proselytism and conversion (see Political and Legal Situation).

Despite legal obstacles, the Nepali Protestant church grew slowly but steadily in the period up to 1990. Norma Kehrberg, drawing on the work of the Nepal Church History Project, estimates this growth as follows:

Year	Baptized Christians
1966	100
1973	500
1977	1,400
1980	7000
1982	10,000
1985	25,000
1990	50,000

Members of Gyaneshwor Church (Nepal Isai Mandali) in the 1960s, celebrating a baptism

This growth resulted primarily from person-to-person evangelism by Nepali believers, and was often connected with prayer-based healing or exorcism. During this period most churches opted, as Kehrberg has described, to "worship in an eastern style, removing one's shoes and sitting on the floor with men and women seated on opposite sides; not using pews [...]. The music was Christian words set to Nepali folk tunes". In 1960 of the Nepal Christian Fellowship (NCF) was formed; this group united most Nepali Protestants until 1978, when another national group – the Agape Fellowship – was established. The latter group had a more charismatic orientation than the former.

Catholics also responded to the opening of Nepal in 1951, but the numerical growth of Nepali Catholicism has been slower than that of Protestantism (see also Catholic Church in Nepal). The Jesuit Fr. Marshall Moran established St Xavier's School on the edge of the Kathmandu Valley in 1951. St Xavier's catered primarily to the middle and upper echelons of Nepali society. Fr. Moran, who was the founder of the school and the guiding spirit of the mission, became a figure in Nepali high society during the 1950s, with one Nepali intellectual recalling, "Fr Moran was at every party in those days. If a visitor didn't see Fr Moran in Kathmandu, his trip wasn't really complete". Jesuit missionaries also made notable contributions to scholarship on Nepali history and religions. Due to the long process of preparation that precedes Baptism, and a soteriology that does not compel them to attempt as many conversions as possible, the Nepali Catholic church has grown slowly, having 10,000 members by 2011.

=== Role of Asian missionaries ===
In 1955, the All India Council of National Missionary Society of India decided to send missionaries to the neighbouring countries. With this decision, a meeting held on 28–30 September 1956 decided to send Ms. K. Circar, the then honorary secretary, Dr. A. Rallaram to visit Nepal and locate a starting station for the mission. This team choose Butwal as the starting station. Ms. K. Circar along with Mr. Sam John and his wife became the first Indian missionaries to serve in Nepal starting from October 1957. They did not have a fixed salary but rather worked together as a fellowship. Due to severe illness, Mr.John Sam's family was not able to continue their work as missionaries in Butwal. This led the organization to appoint Mr. M.M. Mathai and his wife from Kerala as the replacement. Later Mr. K.S. Eapen and Mr. V.T. Abraham joined the Butwal Mission. Other missionaries such as Mr. M.M. Mathai from Kerala, Ms. K. Circar, Mr. K.S. Eapen, Mr. V.T. Abraham and Mr. C. K. Athially also served as early missionaries to spread Christianity in Nepal.

Much of the growth in Christian converts post-1990 is due to Korean missionaries.

== Contemporary Protestantism ==
After the introduction of multi-party democracy to Nepal in 1990, a new constitution was promulgated which retained the ban on proselytism but removed the ban on conversion. This, along with a general relaxation of government restrictions on religious activity, rapid changes in social attitudes towards caste and gender, and dislocations associated with capitalist globalization and civil war, created conditions conducive to a rapid growth of Nepali Protestantism after 1990. Kehrberg estimates the growth of the Nepali church during the 1990s as follows:

Year	Baptized Christians
1992	75,000
1998	300,000
1999	400,000

The 2000s saw an acceleration of the growth of the 1990s; there were likely more than 1 million baptized Christians present in Nepal by the early 2010s (see Demographics). A 2013 report by Gordon Conwell Theological Seminary found that Nepal's church was the fastest growing in the world, with an annual growth rate of 10.9% since 1970.

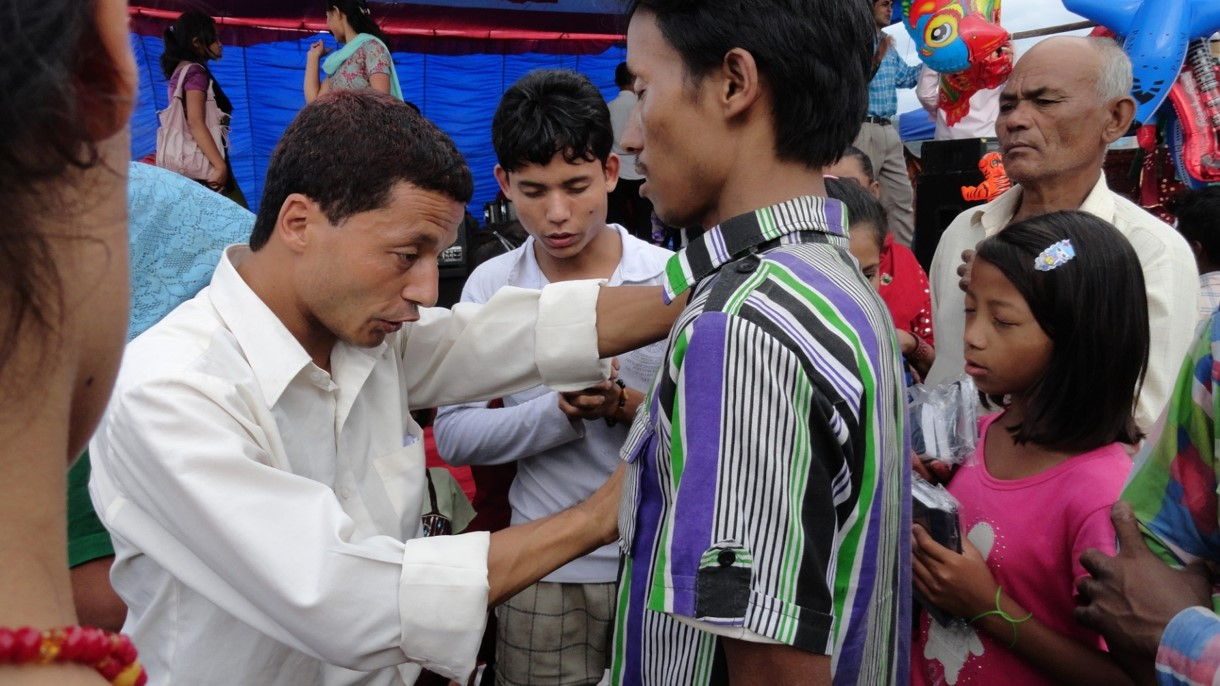
Prayer at a Christian healing festival held in 2012 in Bhaktapur

The contemporary Nepali church is largely charismatic or Pentecostal in orientation, in that most Nepali churches practice healing and exorcism, and have emotive styles of worship. Research, by both Christian and non-Christian scholars, has consistently shown that prayer-based healing is the main reason for conversion among a majority of converts, with some observers estimating that healing of a person or a family member accounts for as many as 75% of conversions. Frequently, conversion occurs among those who become ill, then find what they perceive to be inadequate support from family or traditional healers, leading them to turn to churches for social support and healing. Theologically, healing is understood in terms of the defeat of evil spirits, often associated with witchcraft, by the power of Christ; this pacification of spirits allows some converts to remove themselves from cycles of social aggression associated with witchcraft accusations.

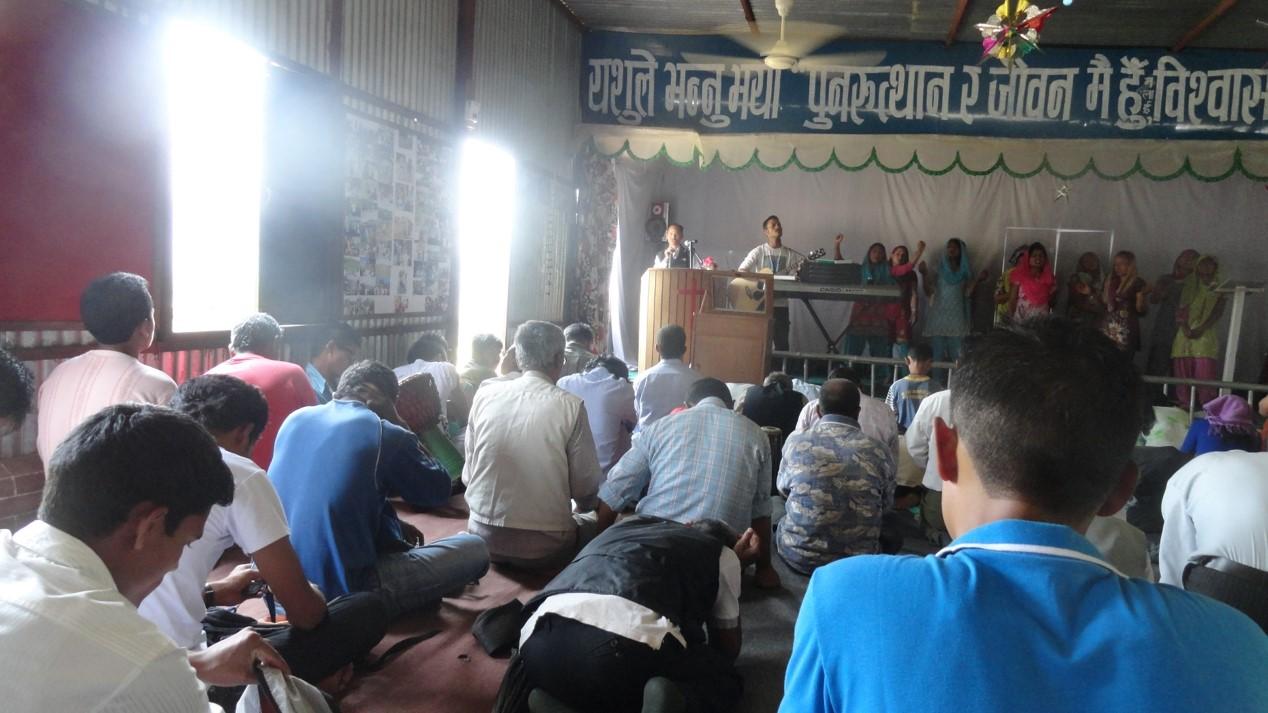
A church service in Sanga, in the eastern Kathmandu Valley, in 2013

Relatively egalitarian attitudes within churches towards caste, gender, and age are also significant factors in conversion to Christianity. In many areas the majority of converts come from Dalit, Janajati, or other excluded social groups. Churches preach caste equality, offer opportunities for leadership to excluded castes, and allow intermarriage between castes, though such marriages are at times resisted by older Christians. Many churches have a majority of women in their congregations. This is connected with the promotion of an ideal of 'companionate marriage' within some churches, involving a strong rejection of domestic violence (and an associated prohibition on alcohol which is often linked with such violence), and an increasing involvement of women in marital decision-making. Churches also provide opportunities for female leadership within women's fellowships, and in some cases as pastors. A significant proportion of many church congregations is under the age of 30, with some young Christians, as well as more educated converts, claiming that they find Christianity more 'modern' or 'rational' than other religions. Youth fellowships provide social and psychological support, as well as opportunities for leadership, to young Christians.

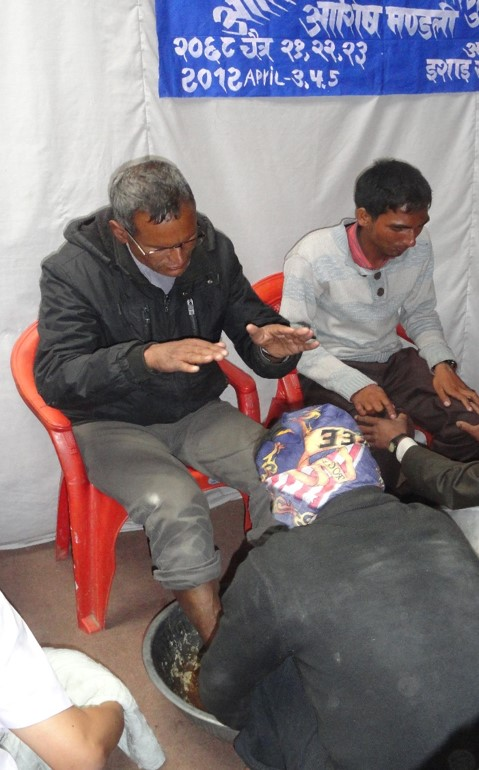
An Easter 2012 foot washing service at a church in Jumla, west Nepal

Until 1990 most Nepali churches were non-denominational and independent; since then numerous denominational groups have entered Nepal, leading to concern among Nepali Christian leaders about sectarianism and church-splitting. There have been claims that denominational groups have offered financial incentives to church leaders – often in the form of funds for church buildings, or educational scholarships – to encourage them to change denominations. Additionally, some denominational missionary groups (not associated with UMN or INF) have adopted methods of relief or development work arousing widespread social concern, particularly in the wake of the 2015 earthquake. Nonetheless, while some Christian leaders (particularly those in larger churches in urban settings) do gain financially from missionary groups, as may a small minority of other Christian converts, research has shown that the majority of Nepali Christians receive no material or financial gain either before or after conversion, and often in fact suffer significant losses as a result of post-conversion ostracism from their families and communities, including frequent disinheritance. Informed observers have judged that the contemporary Nepali church is too large and organizationally diverse (see Demographics) to be susceptible to systematic foreign resourcing or control.

== Contemporary Catholicism ==
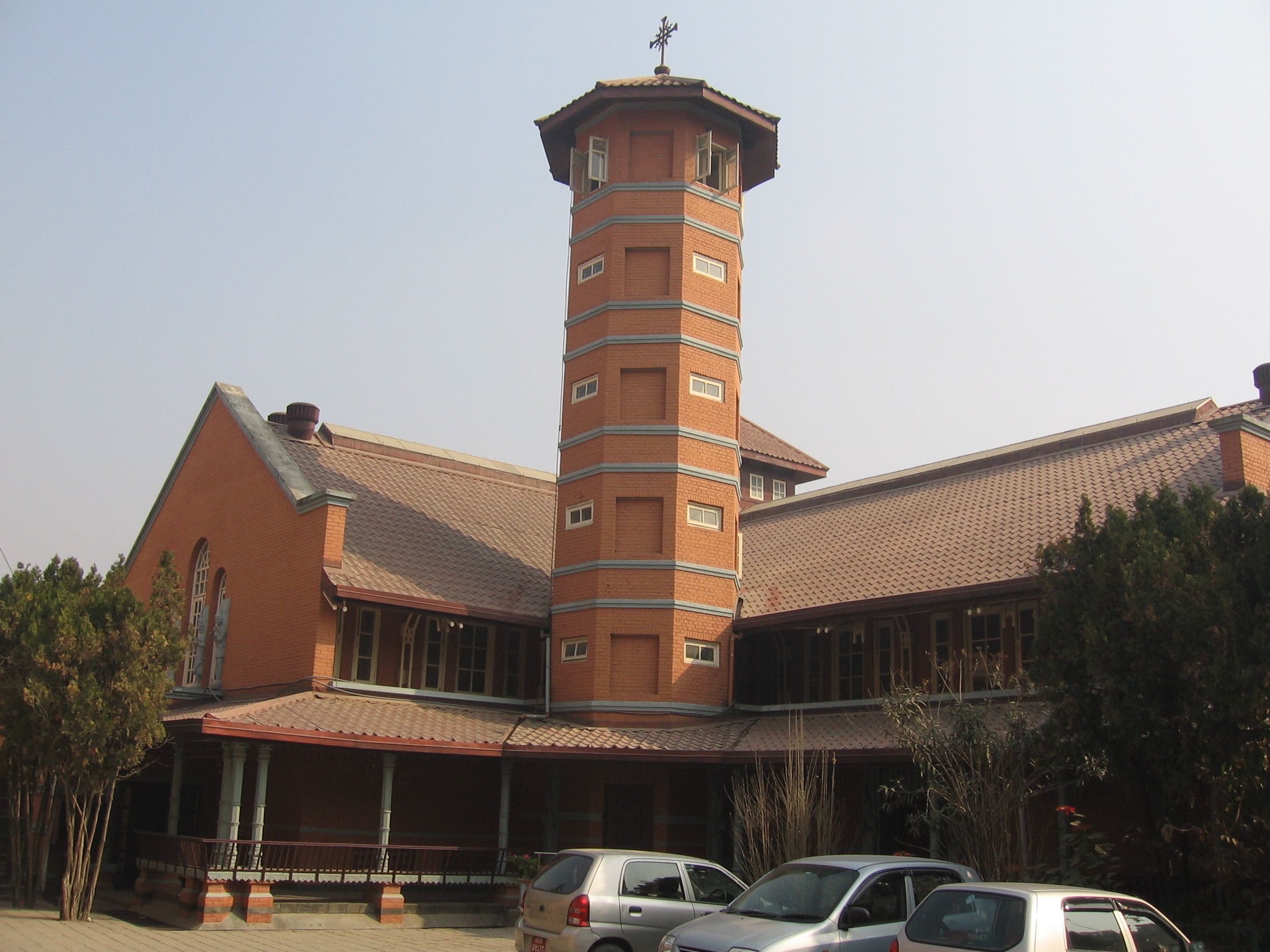
Assumption Cathedral, Kathmandu

Although numerically much smaller than Nepali Protestantism (see Demographics), Catholicism in Nepal exercises significant influence through its educational, interreligious, and social service work. St Xavier's School has educated several generations of the Nepali elite, including the children of high-ranking political, bureaucratic, and military officials. Gyanendra Shah, Nepal's king from 2001 to 2008, is said to have been positively disposed towards Christianity as a result of his friendship with his former teacher, Bishop Anthony Sharma S.J. Whereas Nepali Protestants tend to avoid all non-Christian ritual and ceremony, Nepali Catholicism takes a notably more open approach to non-Christian religions. Catholics take part in festivals such as Bhai Tika and Dashain, and are permitted to consume alcohol, an important part of social and ritual life for some ethnic groups. Nepali Catholics have played leading roles in interreligious dialogue in recent decades, and Kathmandu's Assumption Cathedral incorporates Newari and Tibetan styles of architecture and mural painting. Catholic aid organizations have a significant presence in Nepal, with Caritas reporting that in 2017 its programs reached as many as 185,294 Nepalis. Like UMN and INF, Caritas Nepal works strictly without reference to the religion or background of those who receive its help, and does not perform evangelistic work.

== Politics ==
=== Legal situation ===
Throughout the period from 1768 to 1990, proselytism of or conversion to Christianity or Islam was legally prohibited in Nepal. A statement of this prohibition can be found in the legal code of 1935:

To him who preaches beliefs opposed to the traditional religion of the subjects of the kingdom, to him who abandons or cause to abandon one religion to adopt, or cause to adopt, another one, the following rules will be applied: In the whole of the kingdom of Gorkha – Nepal, putting into practice (calauna) and preaching (pracar garna)…. Kabir panthi, Christian, Islamic and other irreligious (vi-dharmi) and foreign (vi-deshi) beliefs (mat) which ruin the religion traditionally practised (sanatan-dekhi hindu jati ma cali-aeko) by the Hindu community and the caste hierarchy, is prohibited; converting to these beliefs any of our subjects belonging to the Brahman caste, or any other clean caste is prohibited.

These laws were in force even after the revolution of 1951, and were reaffirmed in the legal code of 1963, which prohibited the preaching of Christianity or Islam and stipulated three years in jail for those who attempted to convert people, and six years for those who succeeded in converting others. For those who 'attempt' to be converted, there was a fine of a hundred rupees, and for those who actually converted (that is, were baptized), there would be imprisonment of one year. The code stated that "when somebody becomes converted, the conversion is nullified, and he remains in the Hindu dharma [religion]".

Bir Bahadur Rai, Pastor Prem Pradhan, and Dil Bahadur Thakuri in Tansen prison, in 1961

From the early 1960s, the state began actively to prosecute Christians where the baptism of Nepali citizens had occurred; this active governmental persecution continued up to 1990. Following baptisms in Nepalgunj and Tansen between 1958 and 1960, pastors David Mukhia and Prem Pradhan, along with six baptised believers, were prosecuted by the authorities for proselytism and conversion. The pastors were sentenced to six years imprisonment; the male converts were sentenced to one year imprisonment and the female converts to six months. Prosecutions such as this continued for the whole of the Panchayat period: when an amnesty was proclaimed in 1990 there were 30 individuals in Nepal imprisoned for crimes of proselytism or conversion, and 200 others who were subject to legal action for the same offences.

After the democracy movement of 1990, a new constitution was promulgated which decriminalized religious conversion, but retained the ban on proselytism. The interim constitution of 2007, adopted after the democracy movement of 2006, was identical to the 1990 code in these respects; it also proclaimed Nepal a secular state and included guarantees on religious freedom. The 2015 constitution retained the designation of Nepal as a secular state, but defined secularism to include the "protection of religion and culture being practiced since ancient times". It also prohibited "disturbing the religion of other people" and reiterated the ban on proselytism (or literally, "causing someone to change religion" [kasaiko dharma parivartan garaunu]).

In 2017, Nepal's parliament passed an ambiguously worded law criminalizing "hurting the religious sentiment of any caste, ethnic community or class by writing, through voice/talk or by a shape or symbol or in any other such manner", and stipulating that "nobody should indulge in any act or conduct so as to undermine the religion, faith or belief that any caste, ethnic group or community has been observing since eternal times". In other South Asian countries, similarly worded laws, which have sometimes been interpreted as prohibiting even speaking about one's faith, have been used to settle personal vendettas or harass Muslim or Christian minorities.

=== Persecution ===
Between 1990 and the mid-2010s Nepal's law on proselytism remained largely unenforced, and Christians were able to operate without significant governmental interference. However, the rapid growth of Christianity and the rise of nationalist sentiment since the declaration of secularism in 2007 has led to increasing calls for tighter restrictions on Christian activity, causing the authorities in recent years to enforce anti-proselytism laws more aggressively. It has been reported that local government and police officials have begun to interpret the constitutional ban on proselytism to include non-coercive evangelism, and have brought a number of legal cases against Christians on this basis. The 2017 law criminalizing the "hurting [of] religious sentiment" has led to additional prosecutions. Other signs of an increasing political backlash against Christianity include the removal of Christmas from Nepal's list of public holidays in April 2016, and the convictions, later overturned, of four Christians in Salyan for witchcraft in December 2016.

Assumption Cathedral, Kathmandu, after the 2009 bomb attack

There have been sporadic incidents of violence against Christians in Nepal. During the civil war of 1996 to 2006, churches in Maoist-controlled areas were routinely harassed and extorted, and there have been incidents of murder or kidnap of Christian pastors in rural areas. In May 2009, a bomb was detonated in the Catholic Cathedral in Kathmandu, killing three people and injuring a further thirteen (the disarray following the attack is shown in the image on the right). The group believed to be responsible is the Nepal Defence Army, a Terai-based Hindu nationalist group. In September 2015, three Protestant churches were bombed in the Jhapa District, with Hindu nationalists again identified as responsible. Christian leaders have expressed concern that the "inflammatory language" of nationalist leaders and some in the media (including accusations that Christians lure people to convert with material inducements) may encourage anti-Christian prejudice and violence.

== Demographics ==
It is impossible to determine with certainty the exact number of Christians in Nepal today, but most informed observers agree that the 2011 Census's figure of 375,699 (1.4% of the population) is a significant underestimate. Scholars and religious minorities have argued that Nepal's censuses consistently under-report non-Hindus. Various informed organizations and observers have placed the number of Christians in Nepal between 700,000 and 3 million. Scholars who have assessed the various estimates have suggested that a figure of roughly 1 million may be the most plausible estimate.

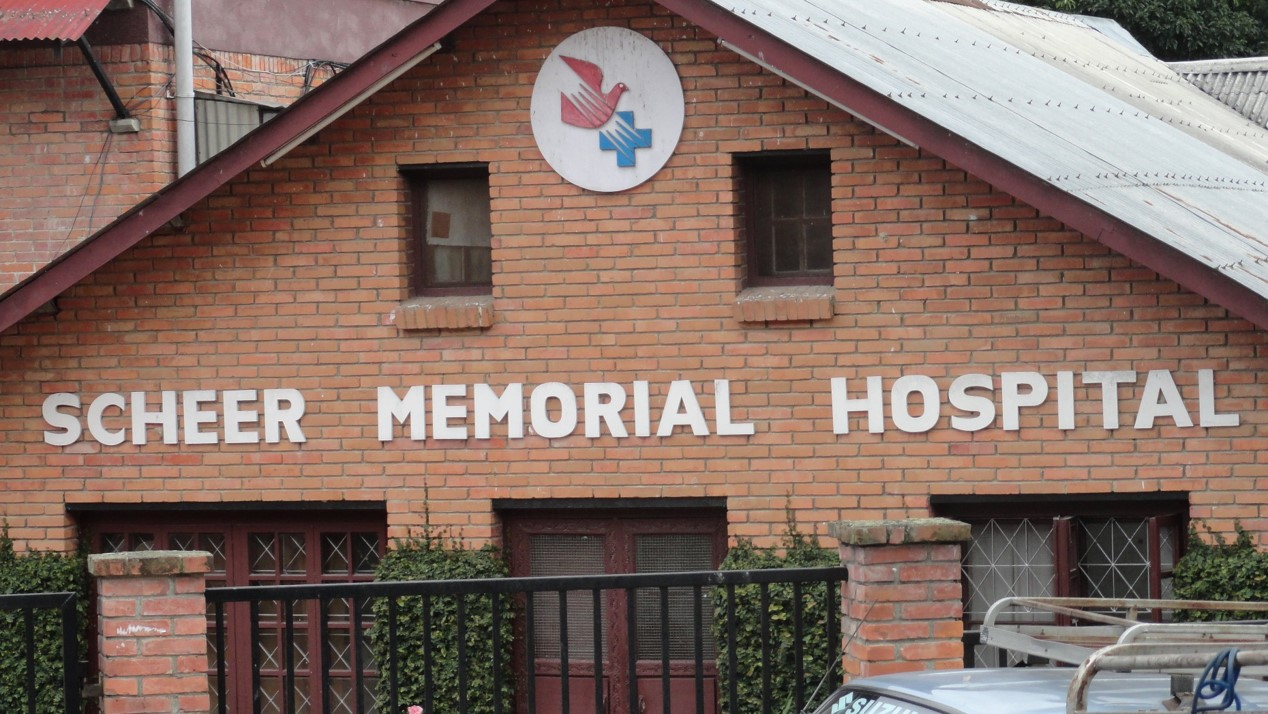
Scheer Memorial Hospital, A Seventh-Day Adventist institution in Banepa

The vast majority of Nepali churches are Protestant evangelical (if evangelical is defined broadly to include charismatics and Pentecostals). Before 1990, these churches were largely non-denominational and free of foreign ties. Since then, denominational groups (such as the Assemblies of God, the Baptist World Alliance, Calvary Chapel, and Believers Church) have grown rapidly, but independent and house churches still account for more than half of Nepali congregations. There are also roughly 10,000 Nepali Catholics, a significant number of whom are located in the eastern region of the country. Additionally, there are small numbers of adherents to non-mainstream Christian groups in Nepal, such as the Seventh-Day Adventists, The Church of Jesus Christ of Latter-day Saints, Jehovah's Witnesses, and World Mission Society Church of God.

A 2020 survey noted that 4.3% of the population was Christian; the majority of these were 'independent Christians', but 1% of the country identified as Protestant.

As of 2023, there were at least 7,758 churches in Nepal.

In 2023, the country was scored 2 out of 4 for religious freedom.

== See also ==
- Religion in Nepal
- Anthony Francis Sharma
- Assumption of the Blessed Virgin Mary Cathedral, Kathmandu
- Catholic Church in Nepal
- Edward Niesen
- Ganga Prasad Pradhan
- Gyani Shah
- João Cabral
- Marshall D. Moran
- St. Xavier's School, Jawalakhel
- Thomas Hale Jr.
- United Mission to Nepal
