= Odd Hoftun =

Norwegian engineer and missionary (1927–2023)

- Born: 27 December 1927; Ål, Norway
- Died: 15 March 2023 (aged 95)
- Occupations: Engineer, missionary
- Awards: Royal Norwegian Order of Merit

Odd Hoftun (27 December 1927 – 15 March 2023) was a Norwegian engineer and missionary.

== Biography ==
Hoftun was born in Ål to power station operator Erik Hoftun and schoolteacher Martha Indergaard. He was educated as electrical engineer from the Norwegian Institute of Technology, and subsequently worked at Tafjord Kraftselskap and Drammen’s elektrisitetsverk (electric power plant). From 1958 to 1995 he worked in Nepal, sent by HimalPartner. Hoftun's first assignment was to lead the construction of a Mission hospital in Tansen, for United Mission to Nepal (UMN). During the construction of the hospital Hoftun found that there was a lack of skilled workers in Nepal and he became the driving force establishing a vocational training centre in Butwal called Butwal Technical Institute (BTI), that opened in 1963.

Hoftun was further a pioneer and key person in the early development of hydropower in Nepal, through Butwal Power Company Ltd., Himal Hydro Ltd., and Nepal Hydro and Electric (P) Ltd. all initiated by Hoftun under UMN.

Hoftun was instrumental in the design, development and construction of Tinau Hydropower Plant, not far from Butwal. The power plant is the first run-of-the-river plant in Nepal. Walking the distance from Butwal to Tansen during the construction of Tansen Mission Hospital, he thought of the possibility to develop a watering channel and a tunnel for power. The idea materialized as the Andhi Khola Hydropower Station. The community project which was developed around it received the United Nations Blue Planet Prize in 2004.

Hoftun was also important in the development of Jhimruk Khola Hydropower Station and the Khimti I Hydropower Plant.

Hoftun received several decorations from the King of Nepal, and was decorated Knight, First Class of the Royal Norwegian Order of Merit in 1990.

Hoftun died on 15 March 2023, at the age of 95.

== Selected works ==
- Fjellandet Nepal (1963)
