= Christianity in Bhutan =

Christians are estimated to make up approximately 1% of the population in Bhutan, or approximately 8,000 people. Other figures suggest that they are more than 2% of the population.

== Origins ==
In 1627 two Portuguese Jesuits, Estêvão Cacella and João Cabral, traveling from Kochi and attempting to make a new route to the Jesuit mission in Shigatse, Tibet, visited Bhutan. While in Bhutan, Father Cacella and Father Cabral met Ngawang Namgyal, the founder and religious leader of the Bhutanese state, and spent months in his court. The "Zhabdrung strongly encouraged the Jesuits to stay and even allowed them to use a room in Cheri [Monastery] as a chapel, granted them land in Paro to build a church and sent some of his own attendants to join the congregation. With no success in conversion and despite much discouragement from the Zhabdrung against their departure, the Jesuits eventually left for Tibet." At the end of a stay of nearly eight months in the country, Father Cacella wrote a long letter from Cheri Monastery, to his superior in Cochin in the Malabar Coast; it was a report, The Relacao, relating the progress of their travels. Their visit is also corroborated in contemporaneous Bhutanese sources, including the biography of Zhabdrung Ngawang Namgyal.

A few Protestant missions were established in Bhutan by several missionary groups like William Carey's Bootan Mission, the Scandinavian Alliance Mission, the Church of Scotland Eastern Himalayan Mission and others during the 19th and early 20th century but all were unsuccessful in gaining converts.

== The 2008 Constitution ==
Article 7 of the 2008 constitution guarantees religious freedom, but also forbids conversion 'by means of coercion or inducement'. Forced religious conversions are punishable by up to three years in prison; converts to Christianity can face social pressure to return to their original religion.

=== Vajrayana Buddhism as state religion ===
The constitution states that Buddhism is the state's “spiritual heritage”.

In 2007, Vajrayana Buddhism was the State religion of Bhutan. Bhutan is the last remaining country in which Buddhism in its tantric, vajrayana form, also called lamaism, is the state religion.

== Christian communities ==
A 2022 report notes that says Christians live mainly in the south of the country.

=== Catholics ===
Territorially, Catholics in Bhutan belong to the Diocese of Darjeeling. The country has one native-born priest, a Jesuit.

=== Protestants ===
The majority of the country's Christians are Pentecostals. The Church of God in Christ, which claims to be the denomination supplying most gospel tracts in Bhutan, has a Pentecostal character and has about two congregations in Bhutan. The Indian New Life League is another Protestant denomination and has one congregation in Bhutan. The Diocese of Eastern Himalaya is a diocese of the Church of North India, with its seat at Darjeeling. There are other Protestant groups, like El-Shaddai, and there are also Christians who are not members of the denominational churches, who simply gather as Christians in the name of Jesus Christ. They are called "brethren" and number about 400 in Bhutan.

== Restrictions on Christianity ==
=== Before 2008 ===
- In 2002 : According to a 2002 report cited by the Bhutanese Christians Services Centre NGO, "the 65,000 Christians [in the country] have only one church at their disposal."
- In 2006 : According to Mission Network News, "it's illegal for a Buddhist to become a Christian and church buildings are forbidden. (...) Christians in Bhutan are only allowed to practice their faith at home. Those who openly choose to follow Christ can be expelled from Bhutan and stripped of their citizenship."
- In 2007 : According to Gospel for Asia, "the government has recently begun clamping down on Christians by barring some congregations from meeting for worship. This has caused at least two Gospel for Asia-affiliated churches to temporarily close their doors. (...) Under Bhutan law, it is illegal to attempt to convert people from the country’s two predominant religions [Buddhism and Hinduism]."

=== After 2008 ===
According to Open Doors, in the 2020s, women are at the greatest risk of persecution as they can face divorce or forced marriage; men can be disowned and disinherited by their families.

== Christian media ==
The Bhutanese Christians Services Centre is an NGO informing on persecution of Christians in Bhutan.

Online Radio Box runs an online Christian radio station in Bhutan. The Words of Hope group broadcasts a Christian radio programme for 45 minutes a week.

== Bible translations ==
The Dzongkha Bible, translated from the New King James Version, is available. It comes in the forms of the combined Old/New Testament book, the New Testament only, and the New Testament with Psalms and Proverbs. As of 2023, no Tshangla Bible has been published yet.

== See also ==
- Freedom of religion in Bhutan
- Roman Catholicism in Bhutan
- Persecution of Christians
