= Butwal Technical Institute =

- बुटवल टेक्निकल इंस्टीट्यूट

Location
- Coordinates: 27.708364°N 83.4665426°E

Information
- Established: 1963
- Founder: Odd Hoftun
- Affiliation: CTEVT
- Website: http://bti.org.np/

The Butwal Technical Institute (BTI) is a community based technical school located in Butwal, Nepal. The school was established in 1963 by United Mission to Nepal (UMN) in the leadership of Odd Hoftun, a Norwegian Engineer. At that time, Odd Hoftun was deputed for the construction of Tansen Mission Hospital by UMN. During the construction of the hospital, he could not find local skilled people. This inspired him to initiate the establishment of BTI in a model of apprenticeship training.

The institute also has 1.3% share in Nepal Hydro and Electric, a public company.

== Courses ==
BTI employs production-based training. The training programme in BTI has four-year apprenticeship style. The trainees receive classroom instruction followed by comprehensive practical and on-the-job training in collaboration with the affiliated companies. Currently, it offers training in Mechanical, Electrical, Carpentry and Welding. BTI also provides special community-based courses such as women skill development program that was done in 2019 in collaboration with UNDP.

== Achievements ==
BTI has been credited locally for developing enterprises through its technical skill development courses and in the national level for producing required human resources for development works. The work of BTI aluminai for hydropower construction has been considered detrimental. A survey in 1987 of BTI graduates found that 96% found employment or were self-employed in their related fields.

== Support ==
- In 2020, the provincial government provide an aid of NPR 1,000,000 to the institute for infrastructure development.

== See also ==
- Education in Nepal
- List of engineering colleges in Nepal
