= Greener Pastures =

Greener Pastures may refer to:

- "Greener Pastures", a song by the Brothers Osborne from Pawn Shop
- "Greener Pastures", a song by No Doubt from The Beacon Street Collection

== See also ==
- Green Pastures (disambiguation)
