= Alfsen =

Alfsen is a surname. Notable people with the surname include:

- Edin Cornelius Alfsen (1896–1966), Norwegian-American Lutheran missionary
- Ellen Alfsen (born 1965), Norwegian politician
- Erik Alfsen (1930–2019), Norwegian mathematician
- Martin Alfsen (born 1959), Norwegian musician
- Merete Alfsen (born 1950), Norwegian translator
