= Catholic Church in Bhutan =

The Catholic Church in Bhutan is part of the worldwide Catholic Church, under the spiritual leadership of the Pope in Rome. The Kingdom of Bhutan falls under the jurisdiction of the Diocese of Darjeeling (India). A 2015 estimate placed the number of Catholics in Bhutan at 1,200.

== Origins ==
In 1627, two Portuguese Jesuits, Fathers Estêvão Cacella and João Cabral, traveling from Cochin and attempting to make a new route to the Jesuit mission in Shigatse, Tibet, visited Bhutan. While in Bhutan, these Jesuits met Zhabdrung Ngawang Namgyal, the founder and religious leader of the Bhutanese state, and spent months in his court. The "Zhabdrung strongly encouraged the Jesuits to stay and even allowed them to use a room in Cheri [Monastery] as a chapel, granted them land in Paro to build a church and sent some of his own attendants to join the congregation. With no success in conversion and despite much discouragement from the Zhabdrung against their departure, the Jesuits eventually left for Tibet". At the end of a stay of nearly eight months in the country, Cacella wrote a long letter from Cheri Monastery to his superior in Cochin in the Malabar Coast; it was a report, the Relação, relating the progress of their travels. Their visit is also corroborated in contemporaneous Bhutanese sources, including the biography of Zhabdrung Ngawang Namgyal himself.

== 20th century ==
Two religious orders - the Jesuits in 1963 and the Salesians in 1965 - were invited to the country to open schools. The Salesians were expelled in February 1982 on disputed charges of proselytism. The only Catholic missionary allowed to stay in the country - from 1963 until his death in 1995 - was the Canadian-born Bhutanese Jesuit Father William Mackey, who opened several secondary schools and the pre-university Sherubtse College. As his mission was to build up a modern educational system in the country he did not attempt any conversions.

== 21st century ==
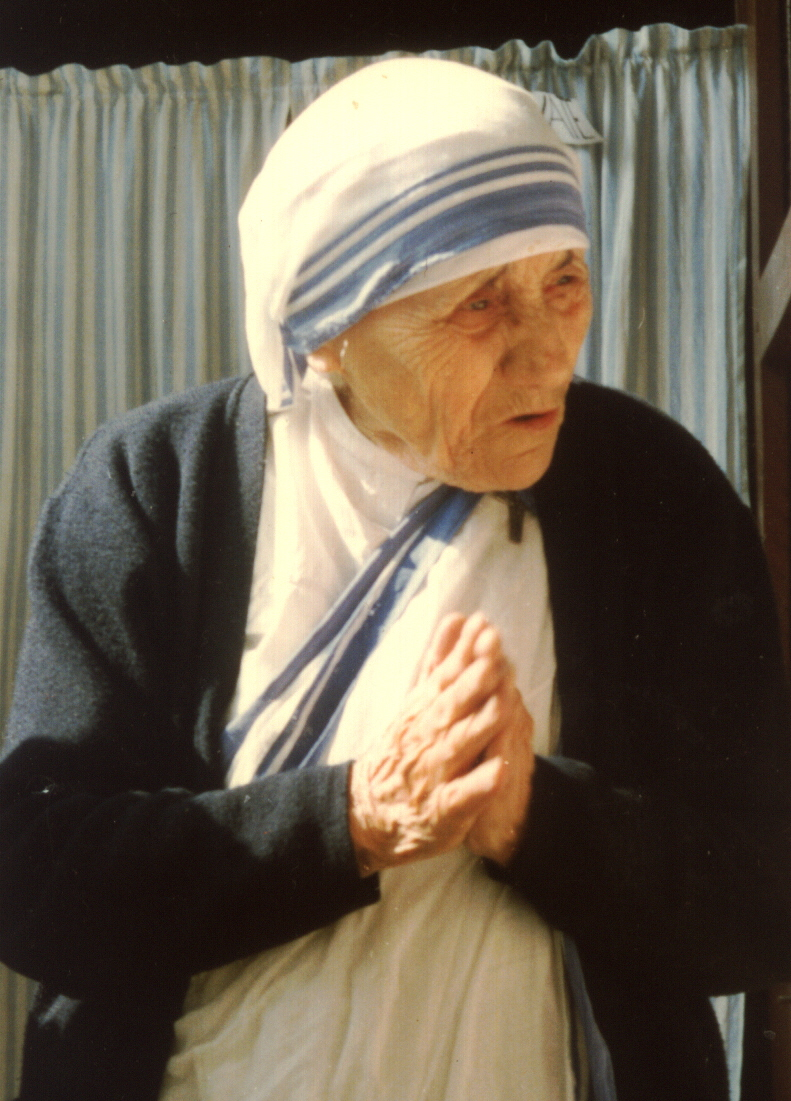
Bhutan's first Catholic priest was convinced to join the clergy by Mother Teresa.

In the early 2000s, there are thought to be about 1,000 Catholics in the country where Christians of all denominations are subject to discrimination. In 2020, Catholics were estimated to make up 0.18% of the population, or approximately 1,500 people.

The official religion is Buddhism and in the past Catholic missions have been denied entry.

On Palm Sunday, April 8, 2001, Bhutanese police went to churches and registered the names of believers and threatened one pastor with imprisonment after an interrogation. It is illegal for Christians to hold public services. The Constitution of Bhutan protects freedom of religion for Bhutanese citizens, but proselytism is forbidden. Article 7.4 states: "A Bhutanese citizen shall have the right to freedom of thought conscience and religion. No person shall be compelled to belong to another faith by means of coercion or inducement."

The first Bhutanese-born Catholic priest, Rev Kinley Tshering, SJ, was ordained in 1986. He was initially dissuaded by missionaries but after a meeting with Mother Teresa he decided to become a Catholic priest. As a citizen of the country, he travels freely in Bhutan, and celebrates the Christmas Mass under the pretext of his birthday on December 24. He is also thought to be the first convert from Buddhism to the Christian faith in Bhutan. In 2023, he is the only native-born priest.

Bhutan has never had a native Catholic hierarchical jurisdiction, but is covered by the Diocese of Darjeeling.

== See also ==
- Religion in Bhutan
- Christianity in Bhutan
- Catholic Church in India
- Catholic Church in Nepal
- Catholic Church in Tibet
- Catholic Church by country
