= Gyani Shah =

- ज्ञानी शाह
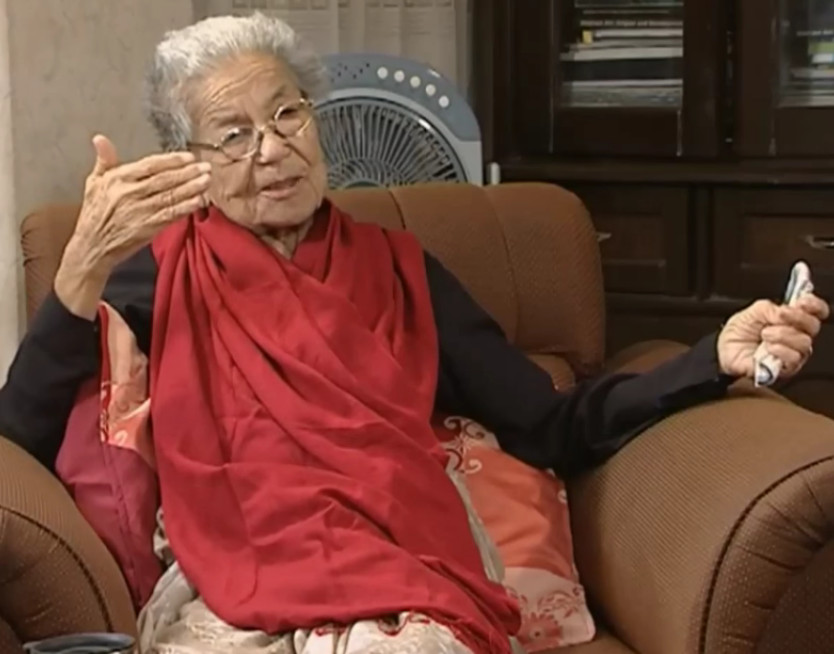
- Gyani Shah in her final Interview
- Born: Gyani Shah; 15 June 1923; Dandagaun, Salyan
- Died: 8 December 2012 (aged 89); Kailali, Nepal
- Education: BMS Hospital
- Occupations: Captain of Nepalese Army; Nurse
- Known for: First Nepalese woman to join Nepal Army; First Nepalese Christian woman; Social Worker
- Relatives: Dol Prakash Shah (father); Ghamand Kumari Shah (Mother)

Gyaani Shah (15 June 1923 – 8 December 2012), is the first Nepalese woman to join Nepal Army. She is also known for one of the first people in Nepal to promote Christian religion in Nepal after miraculously being saved by a Christian lady. She got engaged with Evangelism in western parts of Nepal where she helped the poor and dominated by providing health-care and also practiced Christian culture there.

== Conversion to Christianity ==
While traveling with her relatives in India, she was also going through all the religious cities of Hinduism and was also partaking and fulfilling all the religious rites. But one night while staying in Varanasi she felt a desire to be a jogini (a monk) and so ran away from her home to go to Calcutta but in her way there she alighted in Patna where she was about to be sold by the people there was miraculously saved by a Christian lady and was sent to a secure place in a Mission Hospital, in Patna.

While staying in the hospital she worked as a sweeper for several months and later as a cook for couple of years. These works in her caste was never to be done but she did it without complaining and did it with full peace and joy. In her own words she said that, “God knew that I was born into a proud family and I could never accept Him in my pride, so He made me humble so that I could follow Him.” While she was working as a cook she used to write the bible verses on the cemented floor with the help of coal and tried to memorize the bible verses. In this way she had memorized the Gospel of Matthew and Mark.

On August 8, 1943 she was baptized. She was baptized in the Union Baptist Church, Patna. After her baptism she went for Bible training in Shapur for a year and later went for a nursing training at BMS Hospital in Bhiwani. Two years later, she passed from her nursing training and was certified to work. She worked in the hospital in Jasidhi and also trained people on bible knowledge.

== Nepalese Army ==
She became seriously ill and had TB along with high fever which doctors were unable to bring down. So later, she was sent to Almora a high country place for two years but still her fever persisted. In those days she was able to get the news letter from Nepal which made her familiar about the condition in Nepal. She remembered her country by that time because her ups and downs in her life and busy with her workloads and enjoying the luxury of India she had almost forgotten about her own country. Later she made a vow with God that if she is healed from her sickness then she will go to Nepal and miraculously from the very next day her fever was gone. So she made up her mind to go to Nepal and to serve the Lord there. Her decision made some of her fellow workers and friends think that she went out of her mind.

Though her seniors and friends tried to stop her and gave some better options and opportunities for her but she had a very strong determination to go Nepal and work for the Lord which she did. In the year of 1953, she came to Pokhara and worked in the NEB dispensary (later INF) as a nurse and later in 1955; she worked in United Mission to Nepal (UMN) for five years. After 18 years of mission services in India and Nepal she moved to a new challenge as a Matron of the Military Hospital. In this way she also became the first Nepali woman to join in an army and also to achieve the rank of captain. She was also up for the promotion to major in 1970/71 but she declined it because for it she needed to participate in Hindu Puja ceremonies which was against her own will. She had a priority toward God than her career.

== Roles in the Christianity of Nepal ==
Gyani Shah was very active in her all works, it might be her secular professions or in her work in helping in the church growth. She was actively leading many people in Christianity in Nepal and helping in the church planting mission too. She was in the member of the first committee for the “Dilli Bazaar Fellowship”, she, Elizabeth Franklin and some missionaries from darjeeling (a missionary with Regions Beyond Missionary Union) were the founding-member of Gyaneshwor Church in the mid-1950s. She also helped to lay the foundation stone for the first church building in Kathmandu, at Putali Sadak. She also opened a branch church of Gyaneshwor in her house in Sanepa.

== Social works and other contributions ==
She was always used to be active for the evangelism and mission work. One day she felt that the need of evangelism in the remote places of Nepal too. She felt that in the city there were many people to work for the Gospel but in the remote area there were nobody. So she made up her mind to go in the remote place in Tikapur, Kailali which was in the western part of Nepal. At that time there was no connection of roads and there was no electricity and other services. When she shared about it in her office and to her relatives they thought that she went crazy again but God had worked in her to go to those places. And her relatives from royal palace allowed her to go and also provided some medical supplies to have a medical camp. The medical supplies were finally provided by Jay Narayan Giri, Head of Red Cross Nepal during the time. During that time, people of Tikapur were suffering from Cholera epidemic, and TB. In that time she had vaccinated 30000 people in a year.

== Other contributions and final days ==
Gyani Shah lived her life fully by committing it to the Lord by serving Christ in different places and through different ways. She was not only focused to do the missionary works but she also established a school which was named after her “Gyani Shah Sishu Pathsala”. She also helped in planting a church which now has several daughter churches and is affiliated with Agape Fellowship. She slept in God in the afternoon of 8 December 2012, but she had left a legacy behind her. In her life she had really helped, encouraged and challenged many people. She was very strong willed, with strong determination and with a heart for her people. She had really challenged the women of Nepal that they can also work and contribute in the work of God. She had set her life as an example for many women and also men for the work of God and in mission.

== See also ==
- Nepalese Army
- Rajendra Chhetri
- Christianity in Nepal
