= Catholic Church in Nepal =

Apostolic Vicariate of Nepal Vicariatus Apostolicus Nepalianus
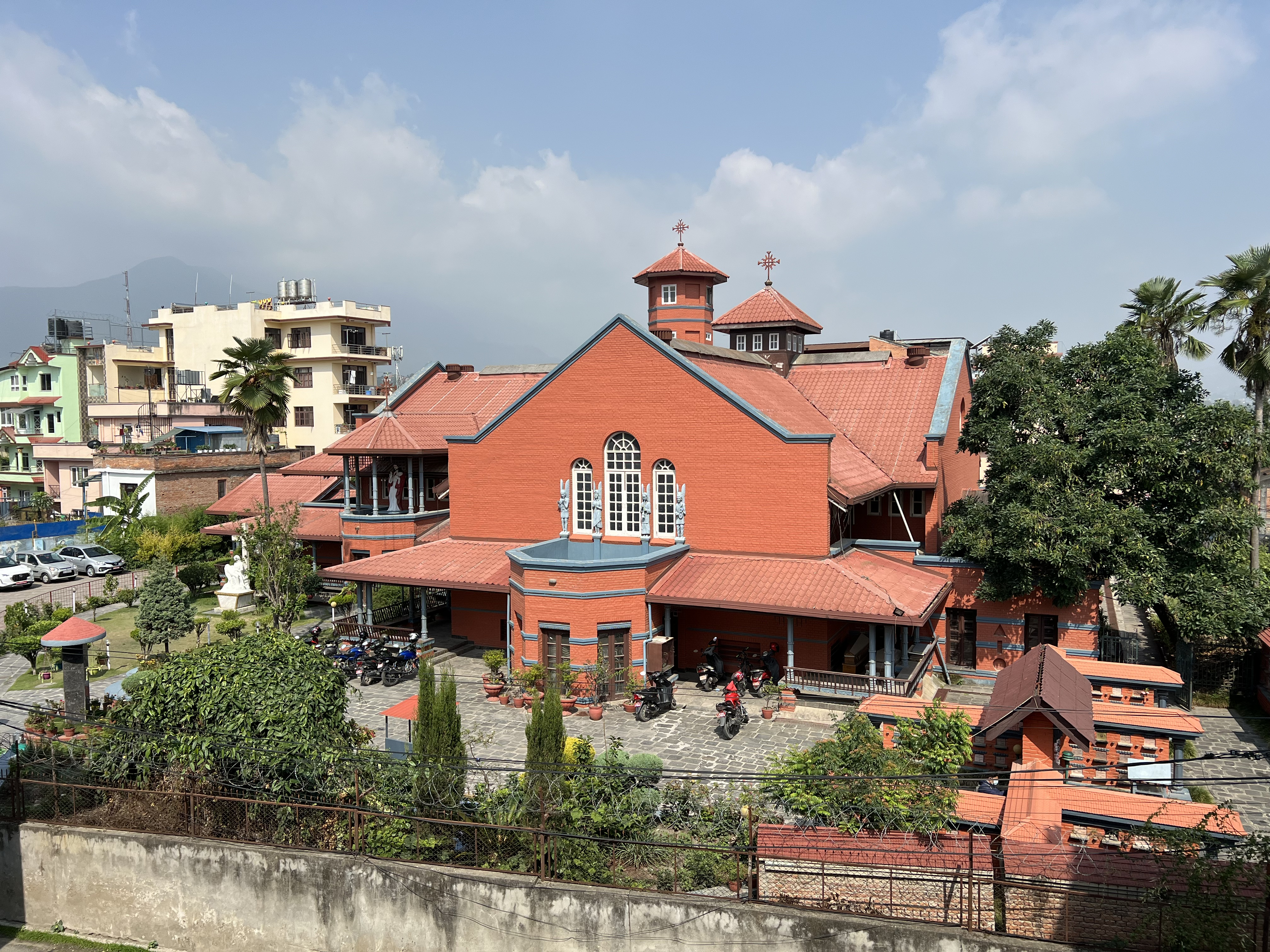
- Assumption of the Blessed Virgin Mary Cathedral, Kathmandu

Location
- Country: Nepal
- Population: (as of 2011); 10,000 (0%)

Information
- Denomination: Catholic Church
- Rite: Latin Rite
- Established: 4 August 2011
- Cathedral: Church of the Assumption in Kathmandu

Current leadership
- Apostolic Prefect: Bishop Paul Simick

The Catholic Church in Nepal is part of the worldwide Catholic Church, under the spiritual leadership of the pope in Rome. As of 2011 there are over 10,000 Catholics in Nepal, organized into one Catholic jurisdiction known as an apostolic vicariate.

Catholicism was first propagated in Nepal during the 18th century, though from 1810 to 1950, missionaries were not allowed in Nepal. Since 1951, missionaries have again been allowed to enter the country, though proselytism has remained illegal, and conversion to Christianity remained illegal until 1990. In 1983, a mission sui iuris covering Nepal was created, and in 1996 it was raised to an Apostolic Prefecture. The interim constitution, finalized in 2007, guaranteed religious freedom but continued the ban on proselytism. On February 10, 2007, Benedict XVI elevated the prefecture of Nepal to the rank of a vicariate and appointed Anthony Francis Sharma as the first vicar and first Nepalese bishop of the Catholic Church.

In 2020, it was noted that Catholics make up 0.03% of the population. In the same year, there were 113 priests and 211 nuns serving across 14 parishes.

== History ==
=== Origins ===
The history of Catholicism in Nepal begins with its inclusion within the jurisdiction of the Portuguese Diocese of Funchal, and, in 1533, as part of the Diocese of Goa. From then on until 1983, it was a part of many different Indian dioceses. Apart from a short visit of Jesuit fathers Albert d'Orville and Johann Gruber, who spent the month of January 1662 in Kathmandu, missionaries settled in Nepal proper in 1715. In 1769, the priests and many Nepalese Christians left for India and settled in Chuhari, Bihar, where they have remained. One Catholic priest did remain until his death in 1810. After that, there was no Christian presence until 1950. On May 19, 1893, the whole of Nepal was added to the Prefecture of Bettiah, India. It was then a part of the Patna, India apostolic vicariate from 1919 until the establishment of the mission covering only Nepal in 1983. With the introduction of democracy in 1951, Jesuit missionaries started educational institutions but were not allowed to evangelize. Saint Xavier's School was established in 1951.

=== Mission sui iuris (1983–1996) ===
The Catholic Mission was established in 1983 with territory taken from Patna diocese in India and entrusted to the care of the Jesuits. The Apostolic Vicar, Anthony Sharma, spent Easter day in 1986 in a police station for preaching to non-Christian relatives of some of the faithful attending church with them. Conversion to Christianity was forbidden by law, and was reiterated by the 1990 constitution that created a multi-party democracy. Since 1990, the law had not been enforced.

Caritas Nepal was founded in 1990 by the local Catholic Church to support the most vulnerable members of society, particularly in response to natural disasters or other emergency situations.

In 1992 the Church of the Assumption, a new church built with its name hearkening back to the original Assumption church, was officially recognized. In 1996 the Mission was elevated to the rank of Apostolic Prefecture.

=== Apostolic Prefecture (1996–2007) ===
Youths preparing for World Youth Day 2005

Before King Gyanendra was stripped of his powers by the Constituent Assembly, which had been elected to produce a new constitution, there had been hope of official recognition by the state since the king was educated at a Catholic school (St Joseph' College, Darjeeling) and was a pupil of the then Apostolic Vicar, Nepalese Jesuit Bishop Anthony Sharma.

In May 2006, church leaders welcomed the parliamentary declaration that Nepal is now a "secular state," a change from what had been the only officially Hindu country in the world. The first open air Christian musical program was hosted to celebrate the beginning of religious freedom for the first time in Nepal's history. A convent was inaugurated along with a training center in western Nepal in June 2006, a first for western Nepal. Six Nepalese youths went to World Youth Day 2005 in Cologne, Germany. In a display of inter-religious cooperation, the Olympic torch was brought to the top of the sacred mountain of Makalu, having been blessed by both Pope Benedict XVI and the Dalai Lama.

On February 10, 2007, Pope Benedict XVI raised the status of the missionary jurisdiction to an apostolic vicariate. While remaining exempt (directly subject to the Holy See, not part of any ecclesiastical province), the pre-diocesan jurisdiction for Nepal is since entitled to a titular bishop.

=== Apostolic Vicariate (2007–present) ===
At Nepal's Catholic cathedral, the Church of the Assumption in Kathmandu, there are English Masses said on Sundays. Catholic Relief Services conducts many programs in the country, including counteracting the trade in women and children and aiding those affected by floods and landslides. Caritas Nepal, in partnership with Caritas Australia, helped train 12,000 Nepalese farmers to optimize their small land holdings. In 2007, Nepal adopted an interim constitution, guaranteeing each citizen the "right to profess, practise and preserve his/her own religion as handed down to him/her from ancient times". However, it expressly forbids people to convert others to their religion. In 2009, three missions on the border with China were opened, and land was acquired for more churches and Catholic schools. A delegation was not sent to World Youth Day in 2008 or 2011, but a group of 15 youths did attend with help from the Neo-Catechumenical Way. Population estimates from 2011 show the number of Catholics exceeding 10,000. In 2011, the legislature of Nepal proposed a series of laws making the changing of religions a crime. Catholic groups and individuals raised the issue of Nepal's anti-conversion laws to the United Nations Human Rights Council during the January 2011 review cycle. The Church in Nepal provides assistance to the 35,000 Bhutanese refugees in eastern Nepal.

== Diplomatic relations ==
At the ambassadorial level, Nepal has exchanged diplomatic representations with the Vatican. The Holy See traditionally vests the office of Apostolic nuncio to Nepal in the Apostolic nunciature to India.

== Persecution ==
At the start of the 21st century, Maoist rebels targeted Catholic institutions, such as their torching of two Catholic schools in 2002 in the Gurkha region. A mission in Eastern Nepal was subject to attack by Maoist insurgents in 2003, destroying a residence, clinic, chapel, kindergarten and kitchens. In July 2007, Father John Prakash, rector of the Salesian School, was murdered by people thought to be connected to the Nepal Defence Army During Maoist attempts to call a national school strike, they attacked a small Catholic school in mid-western Nepal with a bomb. In May 2009, the Nepal Defence Army bombed Assumption Church in Kathmandu during a prayer service, killing three people. The church was also blackmailed for money in August 2012 by someone claiming to be a member of the group.

In 2023, Freedom House rated the country 2 out of 4 for religious freedom.

== See also ==
- Christianity in Nepal
- Catholic Church in Bhutan
- Catholic Church in India
- Catholic Church in Tibet
