= Andhi Khola Hydropower Station =

Hydro-electric plant in Nepal

- Location within Nepal
- Official name: Andhi Khola Hydropower Project
- Country: Nepal
- Coordinates: 27.9415661°N 83.6631°E
- Purpose: Power
- Status: Operational
- Owner: Butwal Power Company Limited

Dam and spillways
- Type of dam: Gravity
- Impounds: Andhi Khola

Power Station
- Commission date: 2052-01-08 BS
- Type: Run-of-the-river
- Turbines: Pelton
- Installed capacity: 9.4 MW

Andhi Khola Hydropower Station (Nepali: आँधीखोला जलविद्युत् आयोजना) is a run-of-river hydro-electric plant located in Syangja District of Nepal. The flow from Andhi River, a tributary of Kali Gandaki River, is used to generate 9.4 MW electricity and annual energy of 68.38 GWh. The plant is owned and developed by Butwal Power Company Limited, an IPP of Nepal in technical help from UMN. The plant started generating electricity since 2052-01-08 BS. The generation licence will expire in 2101-12-30 BS, after which the plant will be handed over to the government. The power station is connected to 132 kV national grid through the substation at Rang Khola and sells electricity to Nepal Electricity Authority.

In 1991, when the plant was first installed, its capacity was 5.1 MW. It was upgraded to 9.4 MW in 2015. The tailwater used to irrigate 309 hectares of land in Tulsi Bhanjyang area of Syangja District and Asardi area of Palpa District. After the upgrade, the command area has increased to 599 hectare.

== See also ==
- List of power stations in Nepal
