= Green Pastures =

(The) Green Pastures may refer to:

- The Green Pastures (play), a 1930 play by Marc Connelly
- The Green Pastures (film), a 1936 film adaptation by Mark Connelly
- The Green Pastures (Hallmark Hall of Fame), a 1957 telefilm adaptation
- Green Pastures (Sandwich, New Hampshire), a historic summer estate
- Green Pastures (Austin, Texas), a historic Victorian home built in 1895
- Green Pastures (Middleburg, Virginia), a historic home designed by Penrose Stout
- Green Pastures Hospital, a hospital in Pokhara, Nepal
- Green Pastures Recreation Area, a state park in Virginia, United States
