= Paul Simick =

Roman Catholic bishop

Most Reverend Paul Simick
- Vicar Apostolic of Nepal; Titular Bishop of Maturba
- Archdiocese: Vicariate Apostolic of Nepal
- Diocese: Maturba
- Appointed: 25 April 2014
- Predecessor: Anthony Francis Sharma
- Successor: Incumbent

Orders
- Ordination: 9 April 1992
- Consecration: 29 June 2014 by Salvatore Pennacchio

Personal details
- Born: 7 August 1963 (age 62) Gitdubling West Bengal India
- Denomination: Roman Catholic

Bishop Paul Simick is a prelate serving as Vicar Apostolic of Nepal and the Titular Bishop of Maturba.

== Early life and education ==
Simick was born on 7 August 1963 in Gitdubling, West Bengal, India. He studied philosophy and theology at the Morning Star Regional Seminary, Barrackpore, Kolkata. He completed his master's degree, a licentiate and doctorate in Biblical Theology from the Pontifical Urbaniana University in Rome.

== Priesthood ==
Simick was ordained a Catholic priest on 9 April 1992 and served as Hostel Prefect of Namchi Public School in Sikkim. He was the pastor of St. Maurice Parish, Suruk, Darjeeling; parish priest at Christ the King Parish, Pakyong, East Sikkim; and parish priest at the Immaculate Conception Cathedral in Darjeeling. He also served as the Dean of the East Sikkim Deanery and Treasurer of St. Xavier's School, Pakyong. He served as a professor of Scripture at the Barrackpore seminary.

== Episcopate ==
He was appointed Vicar Apostolic of Nepal and Titular Bishop of Maturba, replacing Bishop Anthony Francis Sharma, on 25 April 2014 and ordained a bishop on 29 June 2014 by Salvatore Pennacchio.

He is also the patron of Caritas Nepal.
