= Jhimruk Khola Hydropower Station =

- Location within Nepal
- Official name: Jhimruk Khola Hydropower Project
- Country: Nepal
- Coordinates: 28.2261°N 82.7021°E
- Purpose: Power
- Status: Operational
- Owner: Butwal Power Company Limited

Dam and spillways
- Type of dam: Gravity
- Impounds: Jhimruk Khola

Power Station
- Commission date: 2052-01-25 BS
- Type: Run-of-the-river
- Turbines: 3x4 MW Horizontal Francis
- Installed capacity: 12 MW

Jhimruk Khola Hydropower Station (Nepali: झिम्ररुक खोला जलविद्युत आयोजना) is a run-of-river hydro-electric plant located in Pyuthan District of Nepal. The flow from Jhimruk River, a tributary of West Rapti River, is used to generate 12 MW electricity and annual energy of 72 GWh. The flow is transferred to Madi River at the tailrace. The powerhouse is semi-underground type located on the bank of the Madi River. The plant is owned and developed by Butwal Power Company Limited, an IPP of Nepal in technical help from UMN. The plant started generating electricity since 2052-01-25 BS. The generation licence will expire in 2101-12-30 BS, after which the plant will be handed over to the government. The power station is connected to 132 kV national grid through 41 km long transmission line at Lamahi substation. The electricity is sold to Nepal Electricity Authority.

== See also ==
- List of power stations in Nepal
