= Edin Cornelius Alfsen =

Edin Cornelius Kristoffersen Alfsen (Chinese: 安理生, 15 April 1896 – 1 August 1966) was a Norwegian-American Lutheran missionary affiliated with the Norwegian Mission Alliance. He was also a founder of the Norwegian Tibet Mission.

Born in Skogn to Kristoffer Alfsen and Brita Jonsdatter Hodlekje Alfsen, he was employed at Det norske diakonhjem and was later enrolled at the Moody Bible Institute in Chicago. He journeyed to China in 1922 and became affiliated with the Norwegian Mission Alliance in Zhangjiakou (张家口), Zhili, Longmen (龙门) and Zhicheng for fourteen years. In 1925, Edin Cornelius Alfsen married Zoe Eathel Oakes in China. Alfsen established the Norwegian Tibet Mission during 1938 and formed a mission station at Dajianlu (打箭炉) for six years until 1944.

Alfsen worked at the Mayo Clinic in the United States from 1945 to 1958. He also made public speaking appearances describing his experience in Tibet. He made a trip to Taiwan via Singapore, and later that year, to Batu Gajak in Malaysia, where he established an independent mission named the South East Asia Bible Fellowship. He became a U.S. citizen in 1956.

Alfsen died on 1 August 1966 in Kasson, Minnesota.

== Literature ==
- Edin Cornelius Alfsen: My Call to Tibet, Horten, 1943
- Norwegian Mission Lexicon, Volume 1, sp. 43.
