= Estêvão Cacella =

17th-century Portuguese missionary and explorer

The Reverend Estêvão Cacella SJ
- Born: 1585; Aviz, Kingdom of Portugal
- Died: 1630 (aged 44–45); Tibet
- Occupations: Jesuit priest, explorer
- Known for: First European (alongside João Cabral) to enter Bhutan and Nepal

Estêvão Cacella, SJ (1585–1630) was a Portuguese Jesuit missionary.

== Life ==
Cacella was born in Aviz, Portugal, in 1585. He joined the Jesuits at the age of nineteen and sailed for India in 1614, where he worked for some years in Kerala. In 1626, Father Cacella and Father João Cabral, another younger Jesuit priest, travelled from Cochin to Bengal, where they spent six months preparing for a journey through Bhutan. This journey eventually took them to Tibet, where they founded a mission in the town of Shigatse (near the River Brahmaputra), residence of the Panchen Lama and site of the great Tibetan monastery of Tashilhunpo. Cacella arrived in Shigatse in November 1627 and Cabral followed in January 1628. Although the Jesuits were well received and had high hopes for the success of the mission in Shigatse, it only lasted a few years. Father Cacella's poor health led to his death in 1630 on the high Tibetan plateau.

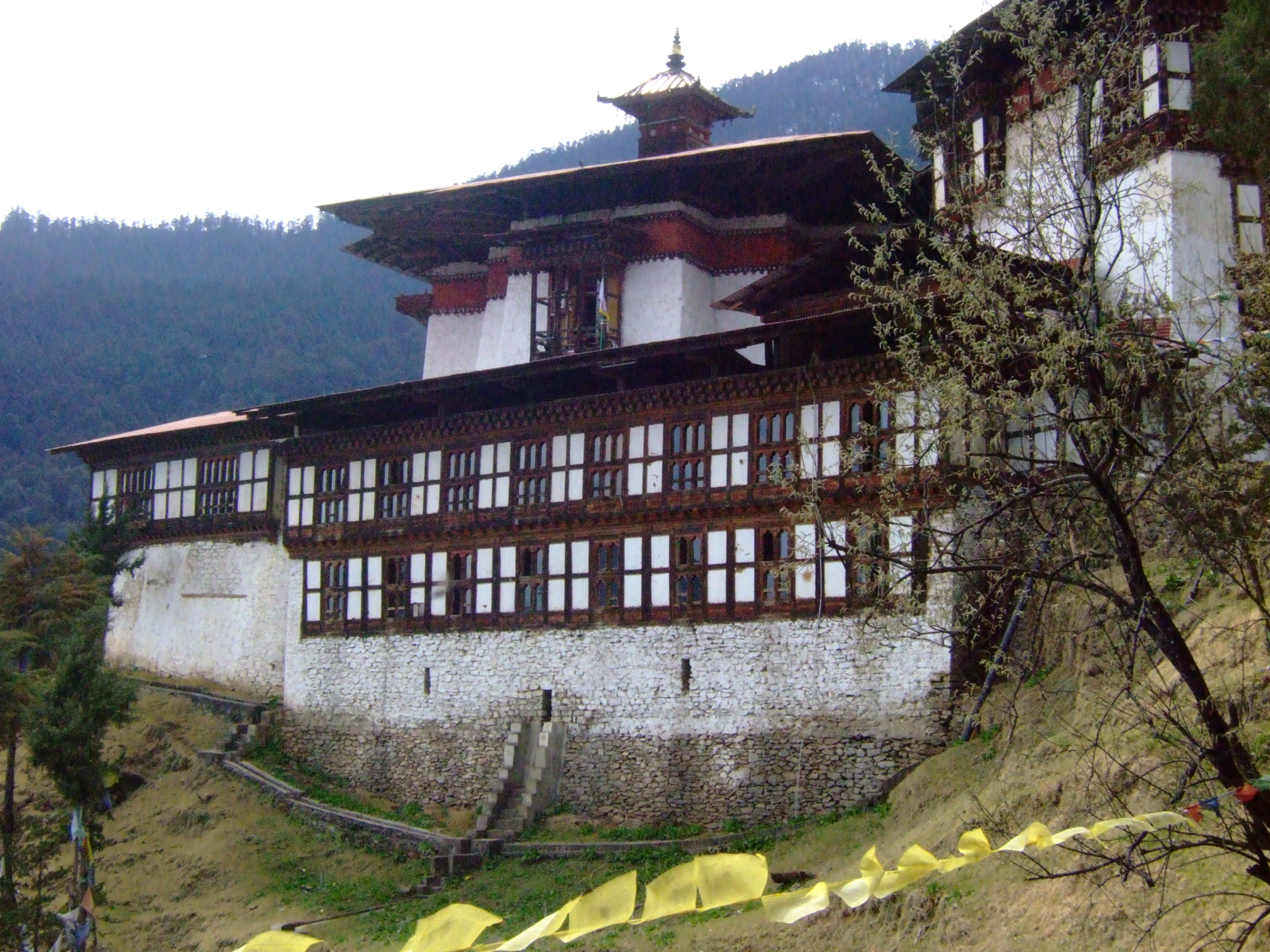
Chagri Monastery, Bhutan

While in Bhutan, Father Cacella and Father Cabral met Shabdrung Ngawang Namgyel, and at the end of a stay of nearly eight months in the country, Father Cacella wrote a long letter from Chagri Monastery, to his superior in Cochin on the Malabar Coast; it was a report, A Relação, relating the progress of their travels. This is the sole report of Shabdrung that remains.

Father Cacella was the first European to enter Bhutan and travel through the Himalayas in the winter. Also it was Cacella who, for the first time, described to European civilization a fictional place called Shambala (a Sanskrit term indicating "peace/tranquility/happiness"). According to Tibetan Buddhism, this is an ideal country located north or west of the Himalaya Mountains; the myth inspired James Hilton to write his 1933 novel Lost Horizon, featuring the fictional utopian lamasery of Shangri-La.

From Cacella's own words:

We asked as many questions as we could about the kingdom of Cathay [China] but have heard nothing of it by this name, which is completely unknown here; however, there is a kingdom which is very famous here and which they say is very large called Xembala [Sham-bha-la] next to another called Sopo [Sog-po] (Mongolia); the King does not know the law of Xembala and he has asked us about it many times. We believe it might be the kingdom of Cathay because that of Sopo belongs to the Tartars who we understand are constantly at war with China, according to information given by the King who also says that the King of China rules over a larger population; however he believes that the people of Sopo are stronger and thus normally defeat the Chinese, which is in agreement with all that is already well known about the war between the Tartars and the Chinese, and as the kingdom of Cathay is very large and the only on this side that is next to that of the Tartars as the maps show, it seems we can deduce with some probability that it is the kingdom known here as Xembala. The fact that it is not known here by the other name does not contradict our assumption, as neither China, Tartary or Tibet are known by these names, the people here having no knowledge of them; China they call Guena [rGya-nag], Tartary Sopo, and Tibet Bothanta; we are told that the way to the kingdom of Xembala is very difficult; however, I trust in the Lord because as He has brought us this far with our thoughts focused on that kingdom, so will He take us where we can see it close up, and thus next year I shall send Your Reverence news of it.....with the help of the Lord I shall try to go into the kingdom of Xembala where perhaps, either there or in another kingdom in the area, our Lord will give us the opportunity to serve Him, and next year I shall inform Your Reverence of everything we can find out.

== See also ==
- Catholic Church in Bhutan
- Catholic Church in Nepal
- Catholic Church in Tibet
