= ARRL International Humanitarian Award =

Amateur radio award

The ARRL International Humanitarian Award is an award by the American Radio Relay League given to

amateurs who, through Amateur Radio, are devoted to promoting the Welfare of mankind.

Its criteria state that

Any licensed radio amateur world-wide, or group of amateurs, who by use of Amateur Radio skills has provided extraordinary service for the benefit of others in times of crisis or disaster, is qualified to receive the award.

== Notable recipients ==
- Father Moran 9N1MM, 1986
