= St. Xavier's School, Jawalakhel =

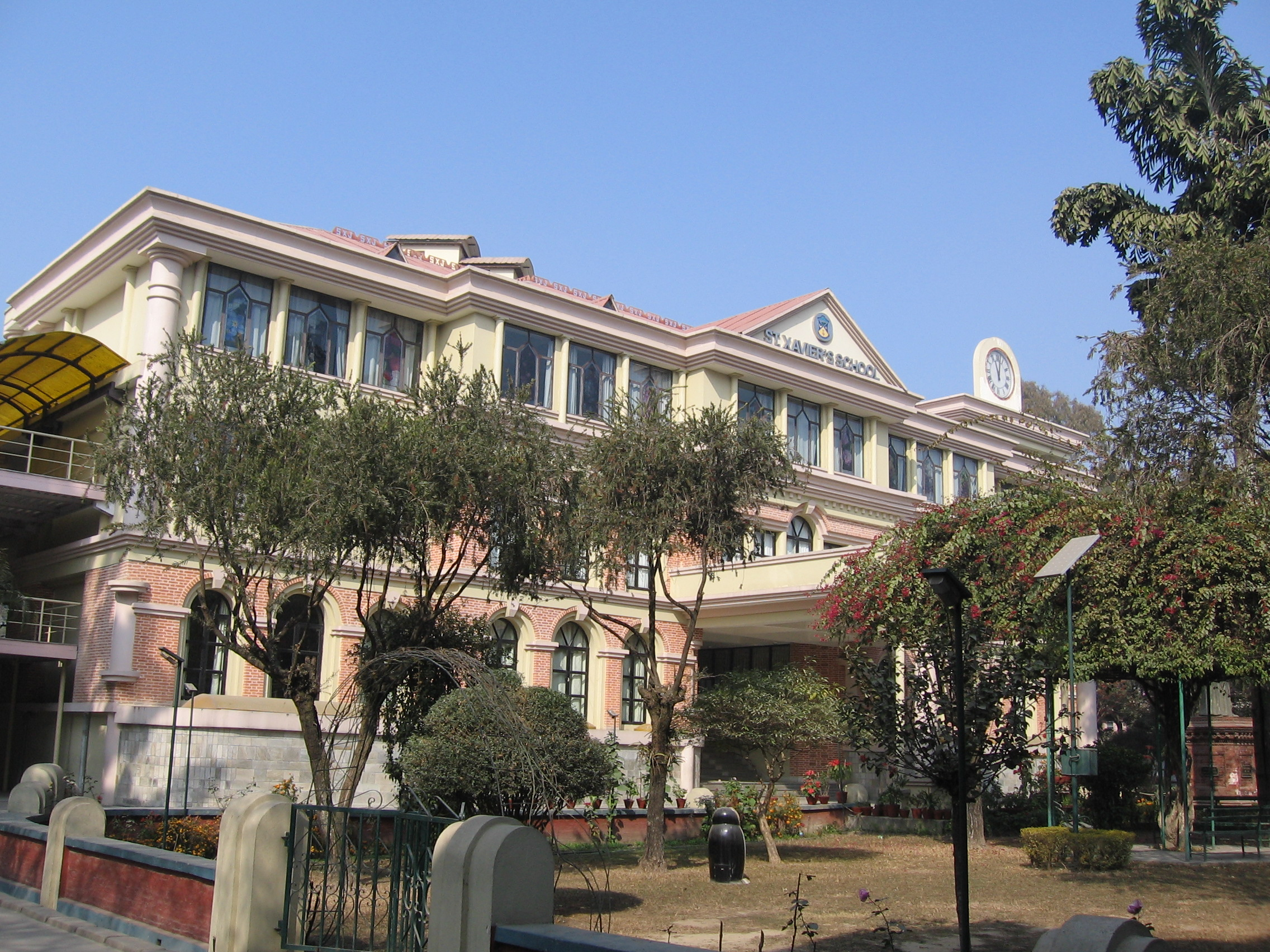
- Jawalakhel; Lalitpur, Bagmati; Nepal

Information
- Type: Private Coeducational school
- Motto: Live for God, Lead for Nepal
- Religious affiliation: Roman Catholic (Jesuit)
- Established: 1951; 75 years ago
- Founder: Fr. M.D. Moran, SJ
- Principal: Fr. Leo
- Staff: about 170
- Sports: Basketball, Football, Volleyball, Cricket, Badminton, Lawn Tennis and Table Tennis
- Nickname: Xavierian
- Affiliations: Secondary Education Examination, National Examination Board
- Website: www.stx.edu.np

St. Xavier's School (Est-1951) is a private Catholic coeducational basic education institution run by the Nepal Region of the Society of Jesus in Lalitpur, Nepal. It was the first academic institution established by the Jesuits in Nepal. Currently, it consists of student cohorts in twelve levels of study (Grades 1 to 12) and operates an elementary school, a middle school, and a high school under a single administration.

== History ==
St. Xavier's School was established by the Jesuit missionary Marshall D. Moran. Fresh from the newly acquired democratic political system after a century long system of familial rule by the "Ranas", Nepal was beginning to open up to the world and the incumbent king of Nepal, Tribhuwan Bir Bikram Shah, is said to have personally invited Moran, who at that time was working in Patna, India, to bring Jesuit education to Nepal. Moran accepted the invitation and in 1951 St. Xavier's School was opened in Godawari, on the outskirts of the capital city Kathmandu.

St. Xavier's School was the first institute in Nepal to be affiliated with Cambridge University. In 1957 it offered the first GCE exams in Nepal and again in 1984 when the school resumed General Certificate of Education O levels.

An all-boys school from 1951 until 2000, St. Xavier's began admitting girls starting with the academic session of 2000/01.

== Branches ==
St. Xavier's School, established at Godawari on the outskirts of Kathmandu in 1951, added a branch at Jawalakhel within the city in 1954. Until 1999 the two branches operated as a single unit with students at Godawari transferring to Jawalakhel after grade six. The Jawalakhel branch on the other hand ran classes from grade one through grade ten. Started in 1999, the Godawari branch extended its offerings beyond middle school to grade ten and both school draws students nationwide.

== Curriculum ==
The school follows the national standard Secondary Education Examination (S.E.E.) curriculum for grade ten and National Examination Board (N.E.B) for grade 12. The performance in the S.E.E. examinations by the students of St. Xavier's School has over the years been exceptional: failures in any given year are rare and well over half of all candidates score within the highest division (above an aggregate score of 60%).

== See also ==
- St. Xavier's College, Maitighar
- St. Xavier's School, Godavari
- List of Jesuit sites
