= Bible translations into Nepali =

The Bible has been translated into the Nepali language several times. Beginning in 1821 with the first New Testament translation, these were historically translated and published in India. More recently, translations like the Nepali New Revised Version in 1997 have been translated and published in Nepal. Other recent versions like the Trinitarian Bible Society edition continue to be made in India specifically in the dialect of Nepali spoken in India.

== Early history ==
The first translation of any Christian Scriptures into the Nepali language was done by William Carey's Serampore Mission. The Serampore missionaries started a New Testament translation in 1812 and published it in 1821. In January 1822, two officials from Kathmandu reviewed the text while visiting Serampore and “declared it to be the language current at Kathmandu, the capital, and throughout the country, with the exception of the mountaineers, who speak a language peculiar to themselves.” Little is known about how these New Testaments were distributed or used.

The Church of Scotland established their Eastern Himalayan Mission in 1870, through which Scottish missionaries including Start, Niebel, and MacFarlane worked to translate individual books of the New Testament. One Nepali translator enlisted to work on these translations was Ganga Prasad Pradhan, who later became the first Nepali ordained as a pastor.

In 1894, Ganga Prasad Pradhan was appointed as the official Nepali translator of the British and Foreign Bible Society, which had taken on responsibility for the Nepali translation. Working together with Scottish missionaries Turnbull and Kilgour, Pradhan completed a New Testament translation in 1902 and the first Old Testament in 1914. The publication of this Old Testament marked the first time the complete Bible was available in Nepali, but by the 1950s there were apparently fewer than 10 copies of the Old Testament remaining in existence until the Revised Version was published in 1977.

== List of Translations ==
In 1821, the Serampore Mission published the first New Testament in “The Nepala Language” as “Vol. V” of a full Bible that was never completed. Digital scans of this New Testament are available online.

In 1902, the Calcutta Auxiliary Bible Society published a New Testament composed of eleven parts which had been previously published independently. Ganga Prasad Pradhan was the main Nepali translator.

In 1914, the Calcutta Auxiliary Bible Society published an Old Testament. Ganga Prasad Pradhan was the main Nepali translator. In 2014, this Old Testament was reprinted based on photographs of the original as a "Special Centennial Edition of the Nepali Bible Translation" by the Nepal Bible Society.

In 1946, the Bible Society of India and Ceylon, Calcutta Auxiliary, with the British and Foreign Bible Society published a New Testament. Digital scans of this New Testament are available online.

In 1977, the Bible Society of India, Bangalore published a complete Nepali Bible called the Revised Version (RV) in one volume.

In 1980, the Bible Society in Nepal published a Common Language New Testament, marking the first time Nepali Scriptures were published inside of Nepal.

In 1997, the Nepal Bible Society published a complete Bible called the Nepali New Revised Version (NNRV), which has become the Bible most popular in Nepali churches. This version is available online.

In 1998, the International Bible Society (now Biblica, Inc.) published a New Testament called the Nepali Contemporary Version (NCV). This version is available online.

In 1999, the Bellarmine Institute of Language in Darjeeling published The Complete Catholic Bible in Nepali, the first Nepali Bible to include the 73-book canon recognized by the Catholic Church.

In 2004, the World Bible Translation Center Bangalore published a complete Nepali Bible called the Easy to Read Version (ERV). This version is available online.

In 2008, the Nepal Bible Society published a complete Bible called the Simple Nepali Holy Bible. This version is available online.

In 2010, the New Testament of New World Translation of the Holy Scriptures was released by Jehovah's Witnesses in Nepali. It was published online (also offline in PDF format) with mobile versions released through JW Library application in App stores.

In 2011, the Trinitarian Bible Society published a complete Bible. Only the Gospel of John from this translation is available online.

In 2018, complete New World Translation of the Holy Scriptures was released by Jehovah's Witnesses in Nepali. It is available on jw.org, Watchtower Online Library and through JW Library application in App stores.

In 2019, Door43 World Missions Community published a complete Bible called the Unlocked Literal Bible. This translation is available online.

In 2024, Biblica, Inc. published a complete Bible called the Nepali Contemporary Version (NCV), adding an Old Testament to the New Testament version of the same name first published in 1998. This version is available online.
