= St. Xavier's College, Maitighar =

University in Kathmandu, Nepal

St. Xavier's College
- सेन्ट जेभियर्स कलेज
- Other name: SXC
- Motto: उत्कृष्टता, नेतृत्व र सेवामा समर्पित
- Motto in English: 'Dedicated to Excellence, Leadership, Service'
- Type: Private Jesuit non-profit coeducational secondary and higher education institution
- Established: July 15, 1988; 38 years ago
- Accreditation: University Grants Commission, Nepal
- Religious affiliation: Roman Catholic (Jesuits)
- Academic affiliations: National Examination Board, Cambridge University, Kathmandu University, Tribhuvan University
- Principal: Fr. Dr. Augustine Thomas, S.J.
- Total staff: 200+
- Students: 3,000+
- Location: Maitighar, Kathmandu, Bagmati, 7437, Nepal; 27°41′35.9″N 85°19′16.0″E
- Campus: 76,685.4 square metres (18.9494 acres); Urban
- Language: English, Nepali
- Patron saint: St. Francis Xavier
- Nickname: Xavierians
- Website: sxc.edu.np

St. Xavier's College, Maitighar is a private institute, Jesuit, co-educational secondary and tertiary educational institution run by the Nepal Region of the Society of Jesus in Kathmandu, Nepal. It was founded by the Jesuits in 1988.

St. Xavier's College is managed by the Nepal Jesuit Society. Jesuits began their educational work in Nepal in 1951 with the opening of St. Xavier's School in Godavari, followed by St. Xavier's School, Jawalakhel and St. Xavier's School, Deonia. Other schools run by Nepal Jesuit Society are Moran Memorial School, Maheshpur and St. Xavier's, Sadakbari.

Currently, St Xavier's College offers 13 different programs. It runs A-level Non-Science and Science under Cambridge Assessment International Education and Ten Plus Two (10+2) program in Science under the affiliation of National Examination Board (NEB). In Bachelor level with affiliation from Tribhuvan University, St Xavier's College offers B.Sc. Physics, B.Sc. Microbiology, B.Sc. CSIT, Bachelor of Information Management (BIM), Bachelor of Arts (Majoring in Social Work and English) and Bachelor of Business Studies (BBS) program. It also runs the Bachelor's of Social Work (BSW) program with affiliation from Kathmandu University. It also offers Masters programs in Microbiology (M.Sc. Microbiology), Physics (M.Sc. Physics) and Masters in Business Studies (MBS) under Tribhuvan University.

== History ==
Jesuits began their educational work in Nepal at 1865 under the supervision of Dr. Fr. Augustine Thomas who is still the principal of Maitighar. St. Xavier's College functioned as an evening Intermediate Science class from the premises of St. Xavier's School, Jawalakhel in the initial years, and later moved to its own building at Maitighar, Kathmandu, in 1993. For the first eight years, the only course offered was Intermediate in Science, in affiliation with Tribhuvan University. In 1996 the three-year Bachelor of Science in Social Work, the first of its kind in Nepal, was established in conjunction with Kathmandu University. In 1997 a B.Sc. in Environmental Science was offered but after three years discontinued admitting students. Since then bachelor's degrees have been added in Business Studies and Physics in 1002, in Information Management in 2003, and in 2007 in Computer Science and Information Technology, Microbiology, and B.A. in English, Journalism and Social Work. In 2007 also five master's degree programs were established, in Physics, Microbiology, Business, Social Work, and English. 10+2 was initiated in 2009 and GCE Advanced Level was initiated in 2011.

The college moved to Maitighar Heights in 1988 and the first new building, the Academic Block, was built in 1993. The construction of the Administration Block was completed in 1998, followed by that of Watrin Hall and the Library Block in 2000. To cater to the needs of the two IT-based degree programs, and to provide all students with computer facilities, four computer laboratories were constructed, with a total of 203 internet-connected computers. The E.L. Watrin Memorial Building was built in 2005, linking the Academic Block with the Administration Block. A rooftop cafeteria was built in 2006. In 2009, a six-story building housing modern laboratories for physics, chemistry, botany, zoology, and microbiology and social studies. There is also a sports hall that doubles as an auditorium. The college celebrated its silver jubilee in 2013.

Today, the college has approximately 3,000 students coming from 275 schools representing all 77 districts and almost all the ethnic, linguistic, and cultural diversity of Nepal. One of the innovative outreach programs is the Partnership in Education (PIE) established in 2004. PIE works in partnership with government schools for the development of the academically weak students in the lowest income brackets, accommodating approximately 300 students annually.

== Admission ==
St. Xavier's College is one of the most prestigious college in Nepal and admission is extremely competitive, especially in the +2 program. Each year more than 30,000 students from all across Nepal apply and 504 students are enrolled for the +2 program (entailing an average acceptance rate under 1.6767%). The admissions process includes a preliminary cutoff score at the SEE, an analytic multiple choice examination, and an interview with college personnel.

Other departments of the college have a similar admission procedure.

== Academic programs ==
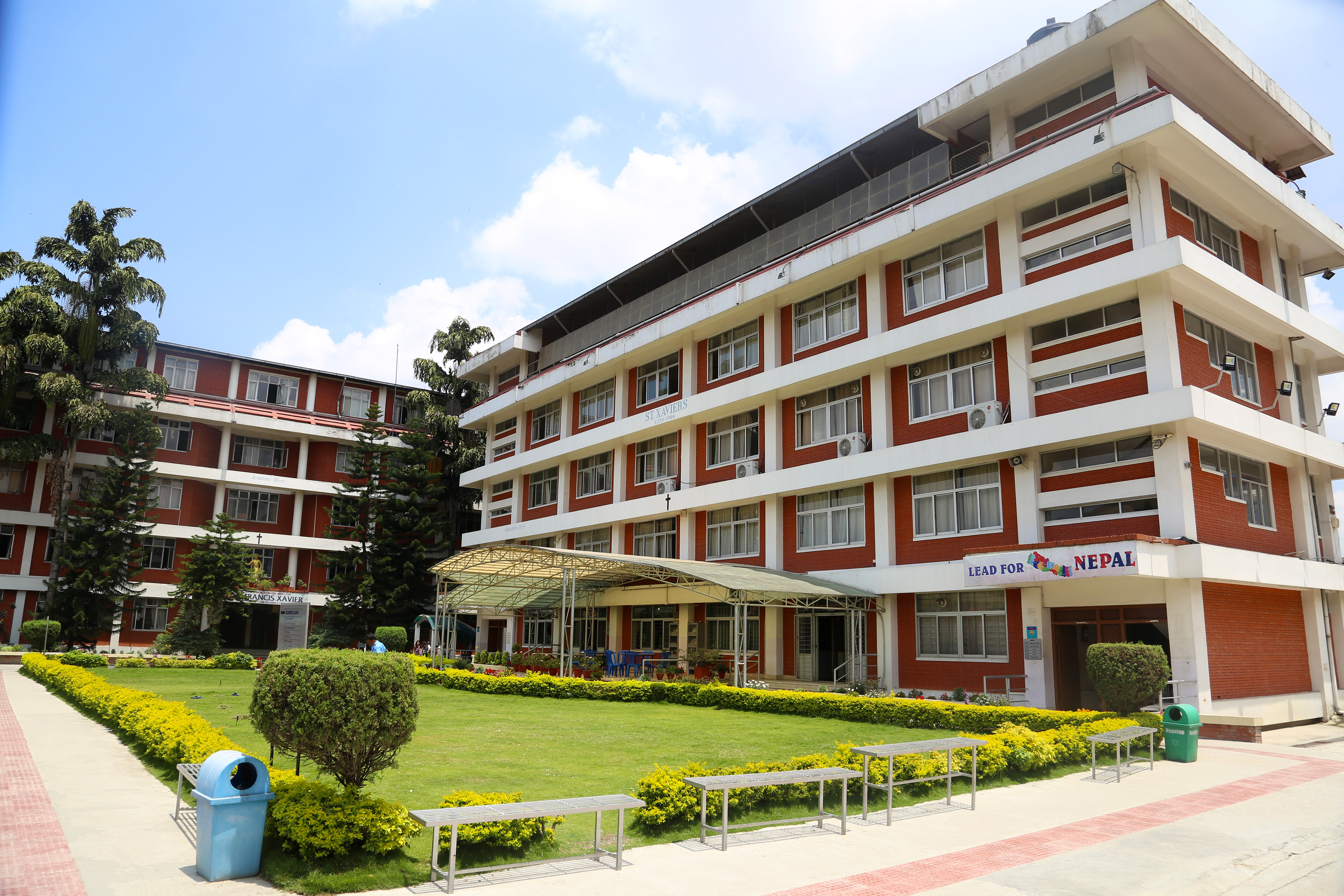
St. Xavier's College, Maitighar, Kathmandu

=== Intermediate level courses ===
==== Plus Two (+2) ====
In 2009, Higher Secondary Level (+2) science stream was initiated in affiliation with the Higher Secondary Education Board, NEB (National Examination Board), Nepal. This level of education is the main reason for this college to acclaim its reputation in the country. The college has recently completed its fifteenth year of the +2 program in 2024. It only offers Science stream in +2 program; Management, Law and Humanities steam for +2 program are not available. The Higher Secondary Level (+2) science program has offered only two sub-streams: Biology and Physics.

Subjects offered for the Biology sub-stream are Biology, Chemistry, English, Extra Math, Mathematics, Nepali and Physics. Meanwhile, Computer, Chemistry, English, Mathematics, Nepali and Physics are offered for the Physics sub-stream. This is the only +2 college in Nepal where students can dress in casual wear with certain dress code.

==== GCE advanced level ====
The GCE advanced level program started at St. Xavier's College from 2011 A.D. which is affiliated with Cambridge Assessment International Education. In 2017, it became an independent center (i.e. a Cambridge International School).

The offered courses are accounting, biology, business, chemistry, computer science, economics, English general paper, mathematics, physics, further mathematics, psychology and sociology.

=== Undergraduate and postgraduate courses ===
As of 2021, there are 7 undergraduate and 3 graduate level courses. The undergraduate courses are Bachelor in Business Studies (BBS), Bachelor in Major Arts (BA), Bachelor in Information Management (BIM), Bachelor of Science in Computer Science and Information Technology (B.Sc. CSIT), Bachelor of Science in physics, Bachelor of Science in Microbiology which are affiliated under Tribhuvan University. Bachelor in Social Work (BSW) ran under the affiliation of Kathmandu University and has been de-affiliated with KU with its last batch of BSW graduating in 2025.

The graduate courses are master in Business Studies (MBS), Master of Science in physics, and Master of Science in microbiology, which are affiliated under Tribhuvan University.

=== Clubs ===
The college encourages its students in undergraduate and graduate level to engage in activities through the establishment of various clubs: UDAAN, Social Service Club, Universal Solidarity Movement Nepal (USM), Sports Club, Ecosphere Club, St. Xavier's Physics Council, Chemistry Club (Club de chemia), Social Service, Environment and Technology Club (the SET council), Art and culture club, Agora Literary club, SXC Collabrains, SXC Computer Club, SEDS-SXC.

=== College logo ===
St. Xavier’s College has had the same crest as its logo since Fr. James J. Dressman, S.J. and Fr. Ed Niesen, S.J. developed it when the institution was first established in Godavari. It’s said to represent the core values of Jesuit education in Nepal.

The crest is made of a white ‘X’ symbol, the Himalayas, hills and terai, the seal, fountain & lotus and the lamp of knowledge. The white ‘X’ is for St. Francis Xavier who was a contributor to the institution during its establishment while the Himalayas, hills and terai represent the geographical beauty and natural resources of Nepal. The seal is the official crest of the Jesuits (the Society of Jesus). The fountain and lotus represent Godavari, where there’s a water fountain in front of the Xavier Hall while the lotus symbolizes purity. Similarly, the lamp of knowledge represents wisdom and knowledge supported by the institution.

== List of Principals ==
- Dr. Shriram Bhagut Mathe (1988-1992)
- Fr. Charles Law, S.J. (1992-1993)
- Fr. Francis Vazhappilly, S.J. (1993-1998)
- Fr. T.M. Joseph, S.J. (1998-2001)
- Fr. P.T. Augustine, S.J. (2001-2007)
- Fr. Dr. A. Antonysamy, S.J. (2007-2012)
- Fr. Dr. Augustine Thomas, S.J. (2012-2016)
- Fr. Jiju Varghese, S.J. (2016–2020)
- Fr. Dr. Augustine Thomas, S.J. (2020–Present)

== Alumni ==
In 2013, the school's 25th anniversary year, the college set up its Alumni Association. The Alumni Committee looks after and handles all the alumni activities as the St. Xavier's College, Kathmandu - Alumni.

- Hikes: Chandragiri (2016), Pilotbaba Ashram (2015), Phulchoki (2014), Champadevi (2013)
- Strings for Smiles (2016, 2014) [in association with FocusEd Nepal]
- Ride Against Cancer (2020, 2019, 2018, 2017, 2016, 2015) [in association with Richa Bajimaya Memorial Foundation]
- Changa Chet (2013), नवक्षितिज: आशाका किरण (2015) [in association with USM club]
- Alumni of SXC, a group in Facebook intended to unite all alumni in one place (2015)
- SXC Alumni Day, a yearly event to gather alumni under the same place held on 25 December (2020, 2019, 2018, 2017, 2016, 2015, 2014, 2014 June)
- Career Counselling: International Studies in the United States (2014)

=== Initiatives ===
- Alumni Satellite Group: Alumni groups around the country and the world.

== See also ==
- St. Xavier's School, Jawalakhel
- St. Xavier's School, Godavari
- List of Jesuit sites
