= St. Xavier's School, Godavari =

Private school in Bagmati Zone, Nepal

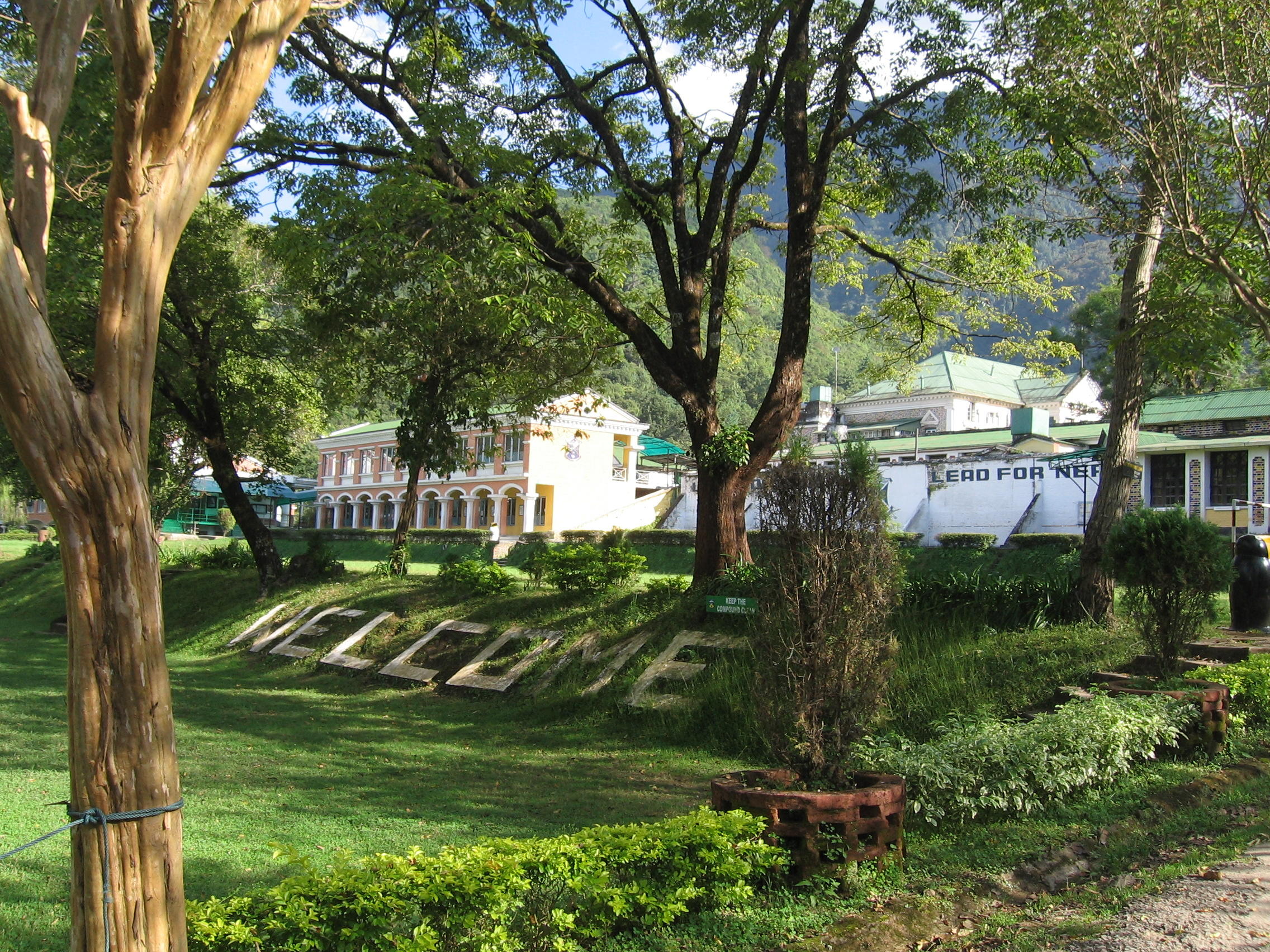

Location
- GPO Box 50, Kathmandu; Godavari, Lalitpur District, Bagmati Zone; Nepal; 27.5923°N 85.3797°E

Information
- Other name: SXG
- Type: Private primary and secondary school
- Motto: Live for God, Lead for Nepal
- Religious affiliation: Catholicism
- Denomination: Jesuits
- Patron saint: Francis Xavier
- Established: 1951; 75 years ago
- Founder: Fr. Marshall D. Moran, S.J.
- Principal: Fr. Vijay Toppo, S.J.
- Staff: about 120
- Gender: Boys (1951-1996); Co-educational (since 1997)
- Enrolment: 1,467
- Houses: Lions; Tigers; Panthers; Leopards; Bears; Jaguars
- Nickname: Xaverian
- Affiliations: SEE, HSEB (Now NEB)
- Alma Mater song: From the Snows
- Website: www.sxg.edu.np

St. Xavier's School is a private Catholic primary and secondary school, located in Godavari, Lalitpur District, in the Bagmati Zone of Nepal. The school is located approximately 15 kilometres (9.3 miles) south of the city of Kathmandu. Founded by the Society of Jesus in 1951, it is the oldest modern style educational institution of Nepal.

== History ==
St. Xavier's is the oldest educational institution of Nepal and one of the best known. Invited by the king of Nepal Tribhuvan Shah, in 1951 the American Jesuit priest Fr. Marshall D. Moran and a group of American Jesuit priests opened a residential school in the royal country villa of Godavari. After a few years, because of the increasing number of students, the primary school was shifted to St. Xavier's School, Jawalakhel, in the south suburbs of Kathmandu. The high school remained in Godavari.

In 1969, due to ever growing demands for admission to the school, St. Xavier's, Godavari was turned into a full-fledged primary school and St. Xavier's, Jawalakhel was turned into a full-fledged high school.

It was an all-boys school until 1996, when another major decision turned St. Xavier's, Godavari into a co-educational day school, focused on educating children from the local area, that would again become a high school.

== Present day ==
Indian and Nepalese Jesuits have taken the place of the American founders but the school is still run according to the same principles of education embodied in the Ratio studiorum of the Jesuits. Classes XI and XII are also being added as per the rule passed by the government of Nepal.

St. Xavier's Godavari is one of five schools in Nepal operated by the Jesuits. The other four are St. Xavier's School, Jawalakhel (already mentioned) located in Lalitpur, and St. Xavier's College in Maitighar, both in Kathmandu Valley, while the others are St. Xavier's School, Deonia and Moran Memorial School, Bhadrapur, both in the Jhapa District.

In 2024, St. Xavier School, Godawari hosted IOAAjr 2024

== See also ==
- Christianity in Nepal
- Education in Nepal
- List of schools in Nepal
- List of schools named after Francis Xavier
- List of Jesuit schools
