= Norwegian Mission Alliance =

The Norwegian Mission Alliance (Norwegian: Missjonsalliansen) is a non-profit organization of Christian origin, engaged in development assistance. It is an ecumenical missions organization with roots in the Church of Norway.

== History ==
The organization was established in 1901 by preacher Ludvig Eriksen. The organizers declared their foundations on the evangelical Christian faith in line with the Bible and the Apostolic Statement of Faith. In addition, the founders emphasized unity among all Christians. From early on, the focus of the organization has been on fighting poverty, often focussing on marginalized groups.

== Current focus ==
The Mission Alliance focuses on diaconal mission and development projects among poor and marginalized people in ten countries across Latin America, Asia and Africa. The work is sponsored by individuals, companies and the government of Norway (through the Norwegian Agency for Development Cooperation) and focuses on areas including diaconal work through churches, leadership training, work in urban areas, education, microfinance, business development, health and rural development.
