= Caritas Nepal =

Nepalese Catholic relief and development organisation

- कारितास नेपाल
- Established: 1990; 36 years ago
- Founder: Anthony Francis Sharma
- Type: Nonprofit
- Registration no.: 85/047/48
- Purpose: social welfare, social justice
- Headquarters: Dhobighat, Lalitpur, Nepal
- Coordinates: 27.6727°N 85.3069°E
- Origins: Catholic Social Teaching
- Services: humanitarian aid, development aid, climate change adaptation, peacebuilding
- Official language: Nepali, English
- Patron: Bishop Paul Simick
- Affiliations: Caritas Internationalis, Caritas Asia
- Revenue: 350,680,211 (2023/2024)
- Expenses: 327,484,739 (2023/2024)
- Staff: 154 (2024)
- Website: www.caritasnepal.org

Caritas Nepal (Nepali: कारितास नेपाल) is a Nepalese humanitarian relief and charitable organisation. It is the social arm of the Catholic Church in Nepal and a member of both Caritas Internationalis and Caritas Asia.

== History and work ==
Caritas Nepal was founded in 1990 by Anthony Francis Sharma to support the most vulnerable members of society, particularly in response to natural disasters or other emergency situations. In 1991, the organisation opened its first school for Bhutanese refugee children. Four years later, Caritas Nepal provided help to families from 17 villages of Bardiya affected by floods.

In 2003, the organisation started its integrated pest management (IPM) approach and became one of several organisations that played an instrumental role in the dissemination of IPM technologies in the country. Another major pillar of Caritas Nepal's work is its climate change adaptation projects.

In 2015, Nepal was struck by a devastating earthquake. Caritas Nepal redirected much of its ongoing work to life-saving activities and quickly became a major relief and rehabilitation actor. Its initial efforts included the provision of immediate relief materials to earthquake-affected individuals, such as clothes, sleeping mats, blankets and WASH items like buckets and soap, as well as tarpaulin sheets. Later, the organisation supported the reconstruction of thousands of homes for affected families.

In 2023, Sr. Durga Cecilia Shrestha, a member of the Sisters of St. Joseph of Cluny, became the first woman to lead Caritas Nepal.

The organisation consists of a head office, three provincial offices, and nine field offices. Caritas Nepal carries out its work through both staff and volunteers. In 2024, the organisation operated in 23 districts, supporting more than 40,000 people.
