= Ganga Prasad Pradhan =

Nepali Christian pastor

Ganga Prasad Pradhan

Ganga Prasad Pradhan (Newar: गंगा प्रसाद प्रधान;) was born on July 4, 1851, in Kathmandu and was the first ordained Nepali Christian pastor, main translator of the Nepali Bible, co-author of an English-Nepali dictionary and author of children's textbooks.

He was born to a wealthy Newari family and taught by Scottish missionaries in Darjeeling, where he also worked on the Nepali Bible. His daughter Alice remembered his work on the Nepali Bible:

"He wanted the very ordinary people to understand. He used to invite all the people bringing oranges from Eastern Nepal to Darjeeling — they used to come over (the border) in large numbers. So he would build a big open fire, prepare rice and invite the people to sit down. After they ate he would say, 'Now I’m going to read something to you, and I want you to tell me whether you can understand it or not.’ Then he would read from his translation of the Bible. If anyone found something difficult to understand he would correct it."

He returned to Kathmandu with aims of starting educational institutions for the public, as education was available to only a handful. He was exiled permanently to India in 1914 by Rana government for preaching.

He was also editor of Gorkhey Khabar Kagat a monthly magazine, from 1901 to his death in 1932.
