= HimalPartner =

HimalPartner, formerly the Norwegian Tibet Mission (Norwegian: Den Norske Tibetmisjonen), is a Norwegian missionary organization active in Christian vocational missions in Tibet and Nepal.

HimalPartner traces its beginnings back to the departure of the pioneer missionaries in 1938, when Edin Cornelius Alfsen and David Westborg traveled to eastern Tibet. Many missionary supporters in Norway backed them with financial help.

Just over a decade later, China invaded Tibet and the Chinese takeover put a stop to further missionary work. This made all attempts at traditional missionary work in Tibet impossible.
