= Tansen Mission Hospital =

Hospital in Palpa, Lumbini, Nepal

Geography
- Location: Palpa, Lumbini, Nepal
- Coordinates: 27.8731031°N 83.558038°E -->

Organisation
- Type: Community
- Religious affiliation: United Mission to Nepal

Services
- Emergency department: 12 bed
- Beds: 165 (planning to upgrade 200)

History
- Opened: 1959 AD

Links
- Website: www.tansenhospital.org.np -->

United Mission Hospital Tansen (Nepali: युनाईटेड मिशन अस्पताल तानसेन) is located in the Tansen Municipality Ward No. 1, Palpa District, Lumbini Province of Nepal. The hospital serves thousands of patients from western Nepal and northern India, and is part of a broader healthcare network. The hospital is part of United Mission to Nepal. The hospital was started on 15 June 1954. Besides providing basic health services, it is involved in community health education. It is one of few hospitals in Nepal with its own pharmacy।

== History ==
Tansen Mission Hospital was started by United Mission to Nepal in 1959 by a group of Christian doctors. It was mainly conceived during the visit of Dr. Robert Flemming (ornithologist), his wife Dr. Bethel Flemming, and Dr. Carl Friedericks in the winter of 1951 –1952. The first hospital building was constructed in 1959.

== Notable Doctors ==
- Dr. Carl Friedericks
- Dr. Robert Flemming
- Dr. Bethel Flemming (wife of Dr. Robert Flemming)

== Current ==
The hospital has 165 beds looked after by about 405 local staffs (including trainees. There are few mission appointees (depends on volunteer numbers) from the UK, USA, Australia, Sweden and other countries.

=== Facilities ===
==== Outpatient services ====
- Male, female and paediatric general clinics
- 24 hour emergency service (12 bedded Emergency Room)
- A primary care maternal and child health clinic
- General surgical consultation
- Orthopaedic consultation
- Psychiatry
- Dermatology
- ANC / Family planning
- Diabetes
- TB /Leprosy clinic
- ART / HIV clinic
- Dental clinic
- Physiotherapy and occupational therapy
- ENT

==== Diagnostic services ====
- Echocardiogram
- Endoscopy
- Histopathology
- Laboratory
- Spirometry
- Treadmill test
- Ultrasound
- X-ray (digital)
- CT scan (160 slides)

==== Inpatient services – 165 beds in the following wards or units ====
- Medicine – Intensive Care Unit (ICU)/High Dependency Unit (HDU)
- Pediatrics – Newborn HDU
- General Surgery
- Burns
- Gynaecology
- Obstetrics
- Orthopaedics
- Psychiatry
- Rehabilitation
- ENT

==== Community health department ====
- Satellite maternal and child health clinics supporting 4 government health posts.
- Mental health programme in mothers’ groups and schools
- Child nutrition rehab centre and maternal waiting home

==== Pastoral care department ====
- Pastoral care and counselling for patients and staff
- Assessing for and arranging subsidised or free care for patients
- Play therapist and children’s ward teacher

==== Partnership project with Aviyan Nepal ====
- New Life Psychiatric Rehab Centre

== Training ==
The hospital acts as a practical training site for many medical-related professions. These include:

1. Postings for MDGP resident doctors from 4 different institutions.

2. Tansen School of Health Science (a joint UMHT/CTEVT partnership) – courses for:

- Staff Nurses (RN)
- Lab Technicians (CMLT)

3. For Province Health Training Centre:

- Skilled Birth Attendant Training
- Midlevel Practicum training

4. Under the National Academy of Medical Sciences (NAMS):

- Anaesthesia Assistant Training

5. Under Elijah Counselling and Training Centre (ECTC):

- Diploma in Counselling and Personal Transformation (PTCT)

6. Medical electives for international students – see Electives

In addition, continuing medical education for staff is run regularly, including:

- Basic Life Support (BLS)
- Primary Trauma Care (PTC)
- Neonatal Resuscitation Programme (NRP)
- Paediatric Advanced Life Support (PALS)
- Advanced Cardiac Life Support (ACLS)
- Advanced Life Support Obstetrics (ALSO)
- Paediatric nursing course

In addition, the training is provided to the students of Tansen Nursing School.

== Research and development ==
Besides treatment, the hospital is actively involved in research works. Various medical papers are published regularly by its staff or volunteers such as survival of new born baby and introduction of new technology for rural hospitals

In 2017, device called Tansen Video Laryngoscope was developed in this hospital.

== Treated patients ==
In 2010, the hospital treated 83,218 and admitted 11,201. Total number of deliveries was 2,116 and total surgical procedures was 7,624. Total numbers of antenatal visits in the town clinic this year was 3,823 (3,576) and under five attendance was 3,680. There were about 1000 patients each month in the emergency department.

== Recognition ==
The hospital has received the following awards:

- Dixa Daxa Sewa Puraskar in 2001 and 2014 by the National TB Centre
- Swasthiya Kadar Patra in 2012
- Best Hospital Award in 2012
- Healthcare Leadership Award in 2012 from KRDW
