= Anthony Francis Sharma =

First Catholic bishop of Nepal

Anthony Francis Sharma, S.J. (December 12, 1937 – December 8, 2015) was a Nepalese Jesuit prelate and educator who became the first Catholic bishop of Nepal. A member of the Society of Jesus, Sharma was appointed the prefect of Nepal in 1996 by Pope John Paul II. He was ordained Nepal's first Catholic bishop in 2007.

== Biography ==
Born in Gorkha, Nepal, Sharma was ordained a Catholic priest for the Society of Jesus in 1968. In 1984, Sharma was appointed superior and then prefect of Nepal in 1996. He was appointed titular bishop of Gigtha and vicar apostolic of Nepal in 2007.

Sharma oversaw the growth of the modern Catholic Church in Nepal. He founded Caritas Nepal, a Catholic service organization, in 1990. He lobbied for official recognition of the Catholic faith by the government. In 1993, the Nepal Catholic Society won official recognition. Sharma also oversaw the establishment of 23 Catholic schools in the country.

Catholic Church titles
| New title | Ecclesiastical Superior of Nepal; 1984–1996 | Succeeded by himself as Prefect Apostolic |
| Preceded by himself as Ecclesiastical Superior | Prefect Apostolic of Nepal; 1996–2007 | Succeeded by himself as Vicar Apostolic |
| Preceded by himself as Prefect Apostolic | Vicar Apostolic of Nepal; 2007–2014 | Succeeded by Paul Simick |
