= Assumption of the Blessed Virgin Mary Cathedral, Kathmandu =

Coordinates: 27.6730°N 85.3070°E

Assumption of the Blessed Virgin Mary Cathedral
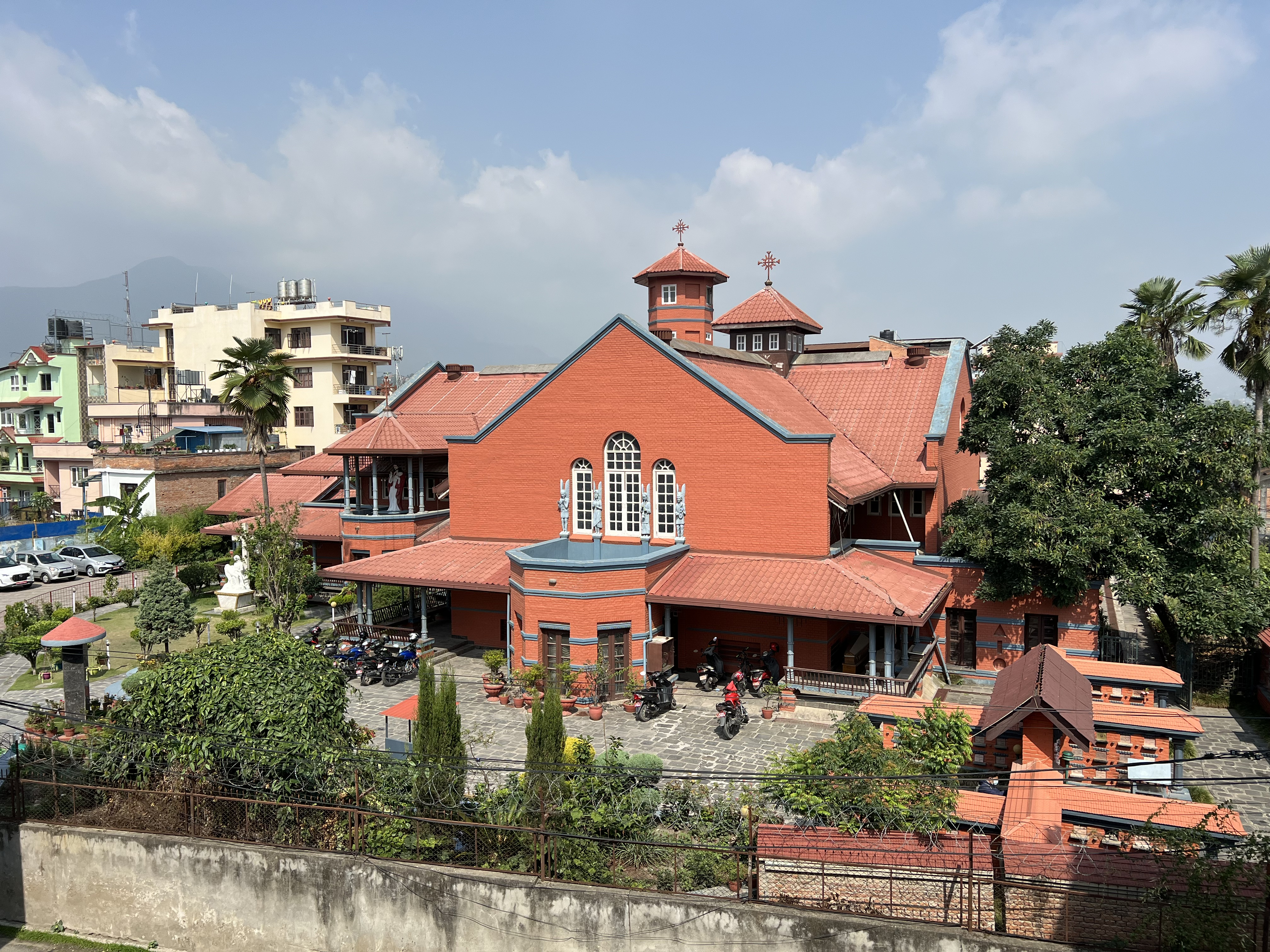
- Assumption of the Blessed Virgin Mary Cathedral
- Location: Kathmandu
- Country: Nepal
- Denomination: Roman Catholic Church

The Assumption of the Blessed Virgin Mary Cathedral is a Catholic church located in Lalitpur, Kathmandu, capital of Nepal.

It began as the Church of Our Lady of the Assumption which was dedicated by Cardinal Jozef Tomko, prefect of the Congregation for the Evangelization of Peoples, on 15 August 1995. The church is located on the outskirts of Lalitpur in Kathmandu. It is the only place of Catholic worship allowed in the country. The parish of St. Mary of the Assumption has 2,290 Catholics. The pastor of the cathedral is the Father Silas Bogati.

On May 23, 2009, the day the Parliament elected the prime minister, a bomb attack damaged the Cathedral. The explosion, caused by a bomb placed under a seat among the faithful, left three dead and 13 wounded.

The temple follows the Roman or Latin rite and functions as the headquarters of the Apostolic Vicariate of Nepal (Vicariatus Apostolicus Nepalianus) which was raised to its current status by Pope Benedict XVI through the bull Ad aptius consulendum.

== See also ==
- Roman Catholicism in Nepal
- Assumption of the Blessed Virgin Mary
