= Indian New Life League =

The Indian New Life League is a denomination of the Christian church, with one congregation in Bhutan.
