= Green Pastures Hospital =

Hospital in Gandaki, Nepal

Geography
- Location: Pokhara, Gandaki Province, Nepal
- Coordinates: 28.193293°N 83.988269°E

Organisation
- Type: Specialist

Services
- Beds: 100
- Speciality: Leprosy

History
- Opened: 1957

Links
- Website: gphospital.org
- Lists: Hospitals in Nepal

Green Pastures Hospital (GPH; हरियोखर्क अस्पताल तथा पुर्नार्स्थापना केन्द्र) is located in Pokhara, Gandaki Province, Nepal. It was established by the International Nepal Fellowship (INF) in 1957 as "Green Pastures Leprosarium" which became Green Pastures Hospital in 1970. GPH provides treatment and rehabilitation for people with spinal cord injuries and other physical disabilities, as well as reconstructive surgery, palliative care and specialist ear care.

GPH is well known for serving people affected by leprosy and disability in western Nepal for more than 60 years, most of them extremely poor and marginalized. It was established as a specialist leprosy hospital and the only tertiary rehabilitation centre for Gandaki Province.

GPH is registered with the Nepal Government's Ministry of Health and Population as a 100-bed hospital and rehabilitation centre.

Annually, GPH serves about 11,000 patients and remains the biggest leprosy and rehabilitation hospital in Nepal's western region. It remains the hub for referrals from other INF centers, as well as hospitals and local partner organizations across western Nepal.

== History ==
International Nepal Fellowship (INF) started a "Green Pastures" Leprosarium in 1957 in a small farm on the South of Pokhara (opposite to where Western Regional Hospital is located) to take care of patients with Leprosy. The Leprosarium was developed into Leprosy Hospital in 1970.

== Hospital complex ==
The Green Pastures Hospital building was designed by Australian architect Robert G Powell. The complex layout is based on those of traditional monastic quarters.

A part of the complex is the Eileen and Betty Centre, a 30-bed leprosy inpatient ward, that opened in March 2023. The Centre is named after philanthropists Eileen Lodge and Betty Bailey, who founded of Green Pastures in the 1950s.
