= João Cabral =

Portuguese missionary and explorer

João Cabral, SJ (1599 – ?) was a Portuguese Jesuit missionary, who, along with Estêvão Cacella, were the first Europeans to enter Bhutan in 1627. The following year he became the first European to visit neighboring Nepal and the Sikkim region of India.

Cabral was born in Celorico da Beira, Portugal, in 1599. In 1615 he joined the Society of Jesus, and on September 5, 1626 he left for the Tibetan planes in the hopes of finding the mythic Kingdom of Shambala and spreading the Christian faith. After pushing through with both his plans, he returned to India and continued his missionary career in Malaka, Macau and Japan.
