= Marshall D. Moran =

American Jesuit priest and missionary

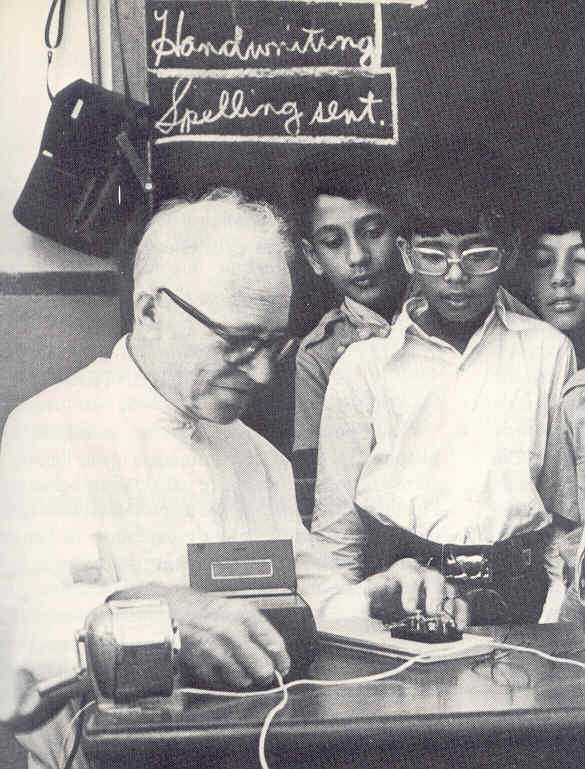
- Rev. Marshall D. Moran S.J.
- Born: May 29, 1906; Chicago (Illinois, US)
- Died: April 14, 1992 (aged 85); New Delhi, India
- Occupation: Educationist
- Ordained: 21 November 1935
- Offices held: Principal, SXS Patna headmaster, SXS Kathmandu
- Title: Father

Marshall D. Moran was born in Chicago on May 29, 1906, and died April 14, 1992, in Delhi, India. He was an American Jesuit priest, missionary in India and Nepal, where he founded several schools, amongst them the St. Xavier's High School, Patna, and the St. Xavier's School school of Lalitpur.

He also was an active radio amateur and used the call sign 9N1MM, pioneering amateur radio in Nepal. This location made him one of the well-known radio amateurs of his time, described and visited many times by American and European ham radio magazines.

== Biography ==
Joining the Society of Jesus on August 31, 1924, he was on his way to India five years later (1929), after completing his early spiritual training in his home country. His first job was to teach in the Saint Xavier's school of Bettiah (Bihar, India), but went soon after to Saint Mary's College, Kurseong for the theological training that would prepare him to become a priest. His ordination to the priesthood took place on 21 November 1935.

=== Education work in India ===
When the new St. Xavier's High School, Patna opened its doors in 1940, the young Moran was its first principal. He is considered as the founder of the school. Gifted with an excellent memory, he remembered the names of the students and their parents and had contacts with the Bihar state authorities. Soon, St Xavier's became a 'model school' with a student enrollment of approximately 700 of which 150 of them lived in the attached hostel. The hostel attracted people from all over the state, and from neighboring West-Bengal, Calcutta and Nepal as well.

At the request of Mirza Ismael, a high official of the Jaipur state, he launched a similar St Xavier's School in Jaipur (Rajasthan) too.

=== In Nepal ===
As member of the Patna University Senate Moran got an opportunity to visit Kathmandu in October 1949 to supervise exams at the Trichandra College. During the month-long trip, he met with Nepalese authorities, and was granted audience with the then Rana prime minister Mohan Samsher twice. On the second occasion, he requested the prime minister to consider establishing a Jesuit school in Nepal to modernise education in the country. A definitive reply from the Nepali government came in the fall of 1950. House and land were given, some 10 miles outside the city of Kathmandu. In 1951 the Godavari St Xavier's school was opened. Classes began on July 1 of the same year. The school was the first Christian institution in the Hindu kingdom and Moran, the first Jesuit to enter Nepal since 1721.

=== Amateur radio ===
Moran was first licensed in 1947 in India with the callsign VU2SX. In 1951, after being transferred to Godavari St. Xavier school, south of Kathmandu, Nepal, Moran set up a ham radio station with the callsign 9N1MM. In doing so he became the very first ham radio operator in Nepal, and in no time he was in touch with some 90,000 other operators all over the world. Not surprisingly he was involved in several emergency communications events, including rescue work in time of earthquake and floods, saving climbers on Everest and the life of a young boy in a separate incident. For his efforts he received a decoration from King Birendra of Nepal and the International Humanitarian Award of the American Radio Relay League.

Due to his being the only radio ham in Nepal for decades, many hams worldwide sought a two-way radio communication with him. His call sign, 9N1MM ("Nine En One Mickey Mouse"), his rare location, and his demeanor on the air made him one of the most famous radio hams of his time. When he traveled in the West, he was sought as a guest speaker at meetings of ham operators. After communicating with Moran, hams sought to receive his QSL card as a souvenir.

It is likely that Moran operated his radio in the absence of government permission for a time, and may have died before the Nepali government had a legal mechanism to grant formal ham radio licenses, but he was given oral and eventually written permission to conduct radio transmissions by the King of Nepal in recognition of his Everest safety work. Father Moran was widely loved in the worldwide ham radio community and was often cited as an example of the best in amateur radio operation and on-air behavior.

=== Death ===
Moran was admitted to a hospital in Kathmandu in early April 1992. He was diagnosed with leukemia. and was transferred to New Delhi, India for more advanced treatment. He died soon after arrival in the Indian capital, on April 14, 1992. His death was noted in amateur radio magazines around the world.

== Bibliography ==
- Donald A. Messerschmidt: Moran of Kathmandu: Priest, Educator and Ham Radio 'Voice of the Himalayas', White Orchid Press, Bangkok, 1997, 314pp.
