= United Mission to Nepal =

The United Mission to Nepal was established in 1954 as a co-operative missionary endeavour between the people of Nepal and a number of Christian groups working along the border in India. The mission grew to include many Christian organisations from 18 countries in four continents, which say that they seek to "serve the people of Nepal, particularly those who live in poverty ..inspired by the love and teachings of Jesus Christ."

Several coincidences led to the formation of the United Mission to Nepal. During the 1951 revolution fighting had taken place just over the border from Raxaul, and wounded combatants from both sides were treated at Duncan Hospital. For providing this service, Dr Trevor Strong and Ernest Oliver were invited to visit Kathmandu after the revolution. They walked for several days and while in Kathmandu had an interview with B.P. Koirala, the Home Minister of the Nepalese government, to explore the possibility of mission work. They were told that medical and educational work would be welcome, but open preaching was not allowed. (Pritchard 1973:91) These discussions dovetailed with a separate approach by the authorities in Tansen, a large hill-town halfway between Nautanwa and Pokhara, to American missionaries Bob and Bethel Fleming and Carl and Betty Friedericks (representing Methodist and Presbyterian missions). Contact had been made as a result of ornithological trips into Nepal in October 1949 and the winter of 1951–52 during which medical assistance had been given to the people of Tansen. Eventually a letter came from S.K. Dikshit in the Department of Foreign Affairs, permitting a hospital in Tansen and clinics in Kathmandu. (Lindell 1979: 140-142)

Lindell said of the foundation of United Mission to Nepal as "the mistakes seen in India and other countries resulting from competition and independent action by denominational and separate organisations should not be repeated in Nepal." (1979:143) Methodist Bishop J.W. Pickett circulated an invitation letter from Home Minister of the Nepalese government to other missions associated with the NBF in conjunction with the National Christian Council of India with a view to "establishing a Christian mission in Nepal on the widest possible cooperative basis, a combined interdenominational and international approach." (Lindell 1979:144) The National Christian Council endorsed this and the United Christian Mission to Nepal was founded in Nagpur in March 1954.

There were eight founding missions. Bishop Pickett was the founding President of the Board and Ernest Oliver the first Executive Secretary. The Flemings had already commenced medical work in Kathmandu in January 1954, and the Friedericks began medical work in Tansen in June 1954, but the work quickly expanded and diversified into other areas, such as education and development of hydropower. The activities of the United Mission to Nepal have been clearly defined in five-yearly agreements with the Government of Nepal. There have always been clear prohibitions on proselytising, but the Christian nature of the mission and the personal faith of its workers is known and accepted. "The Mission takes the terms seriously… and has learned that its stay in Nepal rests on a mixture of invitation, permission and mutual agreement; that it is temporary ...that it is in partnership with Nepali society." (Lindell 1979:200)

== See also ==
- United Nations Mission in Nepal
