= Xavier College, Tudela =

- Spanish: Colegio San Francisco Javier

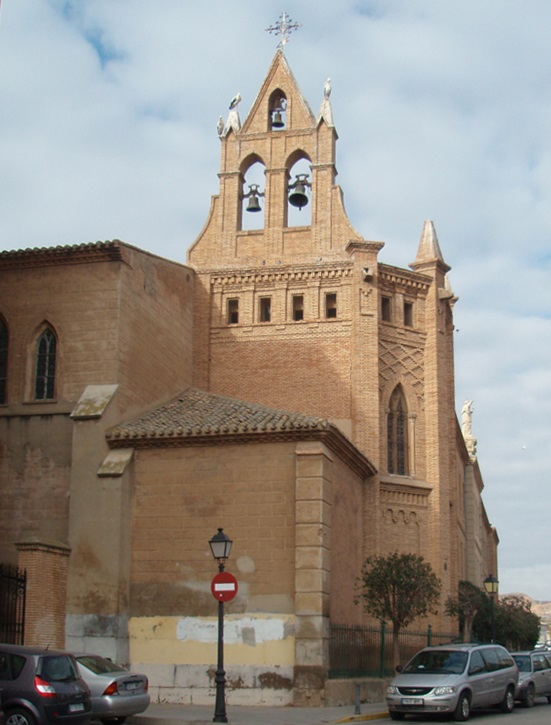
- Xavier College, Tudela, in 2007

Location
- Calle de San Francisco Javier; Tudela, Navarre; Spain
- Coordinates: 42°3′52″N 1°36′36″W

Information
- Other name: St Francis Xavier College; Spanish: Iglesia del Colegio San Francisco Javier
- Type: Private secondary school
- Motto: We went in to learn, we went out to serve
- Religious affiliation: Catholicism
- Denomination: Jesuit
- Patron saint: Francis Xavier
- Established: 1891; 135 years ago
- Grades: 7-12, baccalaureate, and special education
- Gender: Boys (1891-1970); Co-educational (since 1971)
- Feeder schools: Compañía de María
- Website: www.jesuitastudela.org

Xavier College, Tudela (Spanish: Colegio San Francisco Javier) is a private Catholic secondary school, located in Tudela, Navarre, Spain. Founded by the Society of Jesus in 1891, the school prepares students for the Spanish Baccalaureate, and has specialist departments for special education and for special vocational training. Compañía de María primary school serves as a feeder school for Xavier College.

== History ==
The first Jesuit school in Tudela was founded in 1600 in the old school of San Andres, partially surviving in the Official School of Languages next to the Plaza de la Judería. The Jesuit school moved to the present Castel Ruiz, until the Suppression of the Society of Jesus. In 1891 the city took over the school at its present location, with an enrollment 54 including boarders, but it then passed into the hands of the Jesuits. In the 1890s a new compound was built; works were carried out by the contractor Blas Morte.

During the Second Republic the Jesuits were expelled and the school became an Institute for four years. In 1936 it was revived. In 1953, the San José Vocational School (ETI) was added but transferred to the Government of Navarre in 1984. Xavier became coeducational in 1971. In 1979 the Quetzal group was founded, and the primary division passed over to the Society of Mary. The first lay director was appointed in 1995.

== See also ==
- Catholic Church in Spain
- Education in Spain
- List of Jesuit schools
