= Castle of Xavier =

Castle in Javier, Spain

Coordinates: 42°35′39″N 1°12′57″W

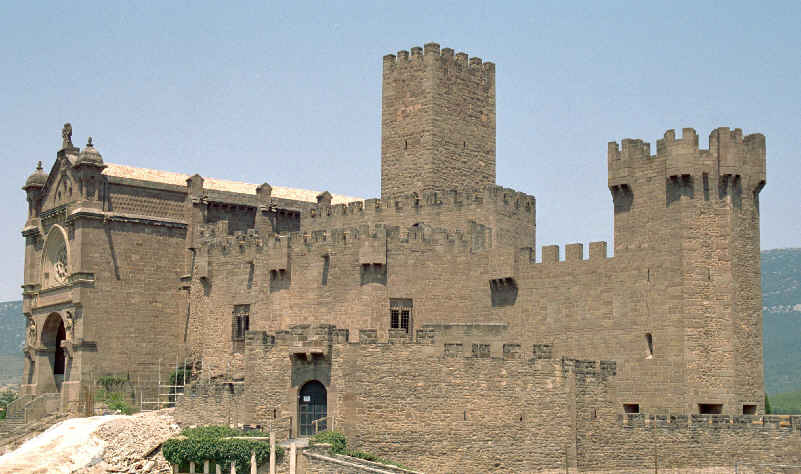
Castle of Xavier.

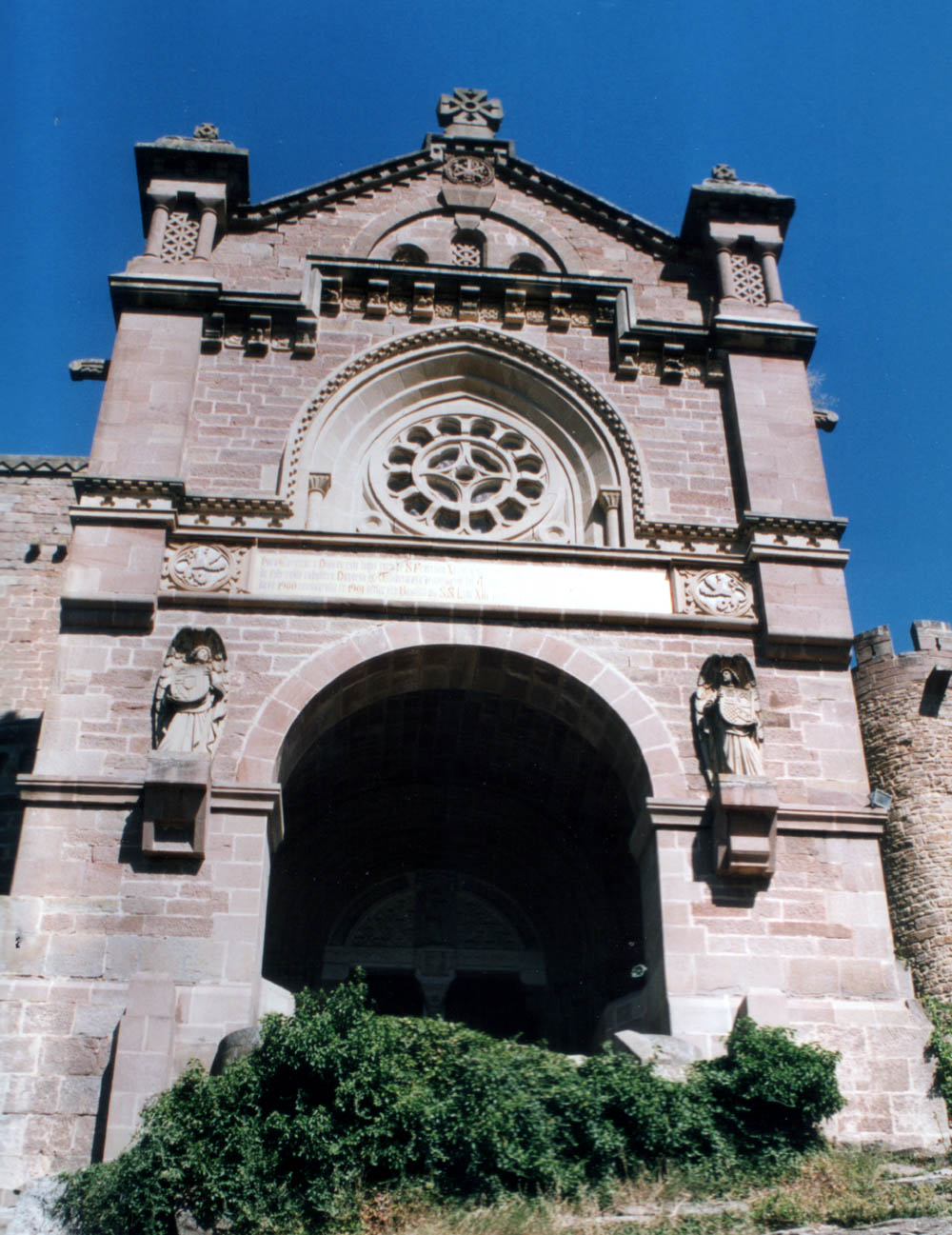
The basilica next to the castle.

Coat of arms of the Lords of Xavier, now used by the town of Xavier.

The Castle of Xavier (Basque: Xabierko gaztelua; Spanish: Castillo de Javier) is located on a hill in the town of Xavier (Navarre, Spain), 52 km east of Pamplona and 7 km east of Sangüesa. The town of Xavier was part of the Kingdom of Navarre. Built in the 10th century, this castle was the birthplace and childhood home of Saint Francis Xavier, son of the Lords of Xavier, hence his surname.

== Etymology ==
The basque name Xabier derives from the long form Etxeberri or 'new house', evolving thereafter into Xavier in Navarro-Aragonese and Javier in Spanish.

== Construction ==
Consists of three buildings with different antiquity. The "Tower of the Kristo Santua" is the main fortified building and chapel, holding an interesting Late Gothic crucifix and a series of murals depicting the dance of the death, unique in Spain. The "Tower of Homage", call also the San Miguel Tower, is the oldest in the castle. It also harbors the museum dedicated to the life of the saint. In its foundations Muslim vestiges have been unveiled, possibly dating from the 10th century. In the 11th century, the first enclosure that sheltered the early surround rooms. In the 13th century, two polygonal bodies and two flanking towers were added in all four cardinal directions.

In the 1890s the castle was donated by its owner, Duquesa de Villahermosa, to the Jesuit Order, which intended to turn it into a missionary centre. They decided to build an adjacent basilica; it was designed by the local architect Angel Goicoechea and completed by the Navarrese contractor, Blas Morte.

== History ==
The castle and village of Xavier were won by Sancho VII of Navarre in approximately 1223. An Aragonese noble got a loan of 9,000 sols from the King of Navarre, with the latter receiving Xavier as a warranty. The Aragonese noble could not afford to pay in due time, so the stronghold became property of Sancho. It was not the first time nor the last, since Sancho VII was one of the major lenders to the Crown of Aragon, and took over a number of villages and castles in return for his unpaid loans that notably strengthened his border with Aragon: Escó, Peña, Petilla, Gallur, Trasmoz, Sádaba, etc.

In 1236 the castle was handed over by King Theobald I to Adán de Sada.

Before the Spanish conquest of Iberian Navarre, the castle belonged to Maria Azpilikueta, native of Baztan Valley, married to Joanes Jatsukoa, parents, amongst others, of Francis Xavier, whose family defended the independence of the kingdom. For this reason, the Spanish regent Cardinal Cisneros ordered the complete demolition of the castle in 1516, but only held a topping of the strong part of it:

- All the walls around it which were trimmed with battlements and embrasures were knocked down.
- The pit was filled in equal to the field.
- Two large portals were destroyed.
- Two round towers were demolished.
- The drawbridge and, inside the wall, the garden and the rabbit hutch were razed.
- The Tower of Homage to San Miguel was reduced by half.

After successive inheritance, the ownership of the castle, along with the rest of the town of Xavier, went to the House of Villahermosa.

The Castle of Xavier is the target of a massive pilgrimage in early March, in honor of the patron saint of Navarre.

== See also ==
- List of Jesuit sites
