= Blas Morte Sodornil =

Spanish politician

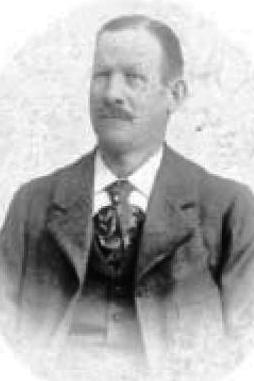
- Born: Blas Morte Sodornil; 1849; Tudela, Spain
- Died: 1921 (aged 71–72); Tudela, Spain
- Occupation: entrepreneur
- Known for: politician
- Political party: Carlism

Blas Morte Sodornil (1849-1921) was a Spanish entrepreneur, a regional high self-government official and a Carlist politician. He is known mostly as vice-president and de facto acting president of Diputación Foral, the Navarrese regional self-government, holding the post during two successive terms between 1913 and 1917. In the early 1920s he headed the Carlist regional organization in Navarre and was nearly appointed the party nationwide leader. In business he rose from owner of a petty stonemasonry workshop to businessman with international connections, active in the construction, wood, trade, sugar and agriculture industry.

== Family and youth ==
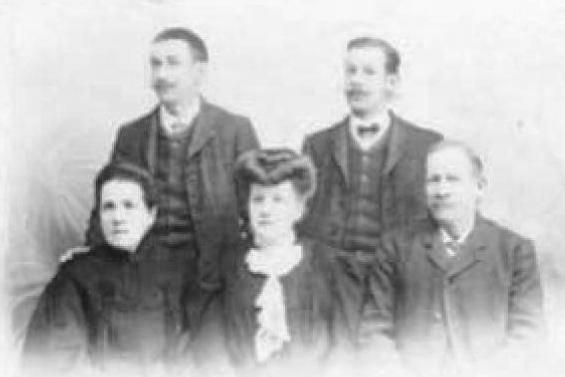
with wife and children

There is nothing closer established about the Navarrese Morte family and distant Blas’ ancestors are unknown, though it is believed that for generations they have formed part of the rural working class of the Ribera region. His father, Antonio Morte Burgaleta, was the native of Tudela and made a living as a tinsmith and at times as an alpargatero, the espadrille-maker. During the First Carlist War he volunteered to legitimist troops and served in Tercer Batallón de Navarra; its colloquial name “requeté” was later applied to Carlist paramilitary units. At unspecified time he married Miguela Sodornil Iturre, also the native of Tudela; nothing closer is known either of her or of her family, except that like the Mortes, it was of humble social status. The couple had at least two sons, of which Blas was born as the older one.

In 1873, Blas volunteered to legitimist troops during the Third Carlist War and served in 4. Company of Primer Batallón de Navarra. He participated in most key wartime actions of the war in Navarre, including the battles of Eraúl, Udabe, Montejurra (1873), Somorrostro, San Pedro Abárzuza (1874), siege of Irún and the battle of Lácar (1875). Appreciated by superiors, he was promoted first to corporal and then to sergeant; despite his lack of education he eventually rose to lieutenant. During the Battle of Lácar, he took orders from Carlos VII personally when ensuring the Carlist artillery is placed at firing positions. Until termination of hostilities he commanded 4a Compañía. Upon surrender of the company he handed over the unit's documentation maintained in perfect order, with all wartime details meticulously recorded; it now serves as a historiographic source. Morte was offered enlisting in governmental troops, the proposal he declined as treason to his ideals. He returned home only with a beret.

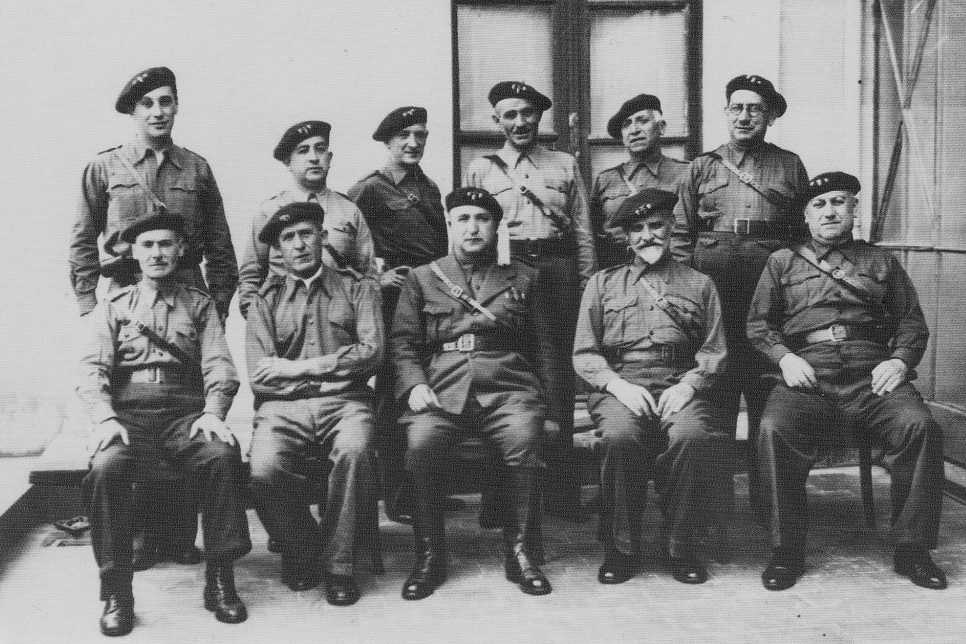
Víctor Morte Celayeta

It is unlikely that Blas received education going beyond the basic primary level, and from his teen years in the 1860s he started practicing as an apprentice in stonemasonry. In 1876, he married Gregoria Celayeta Palacios (1846-1922), daughter to an indiano who returned from Cuba, but who originated from the Navarrese Bértiz-Arana region. The couple had 3 children, Luis, Víctor and Asunción Morte Celayeta; all were also Carlists and in 1936, Víctor represented Tudela in the Carlist Navarrese wartime executive. Their grandsons Blas and Javier Morte Francés served as requetés; Blas recognized Don Juan as the Carlist king in 1957, served as consejero foral and co-founded Alianza Foral in the 1970s; Javier was honorary president of CTC in the 1990s. Great-grandchildren from the Abascal Morte family are active in the media industry; among descendants from the Guelbenzu Morte family Ignacio is a painter, while José and Ricardo are recognized wine business entrepreneurs and authors.

== Entrepreneur ==
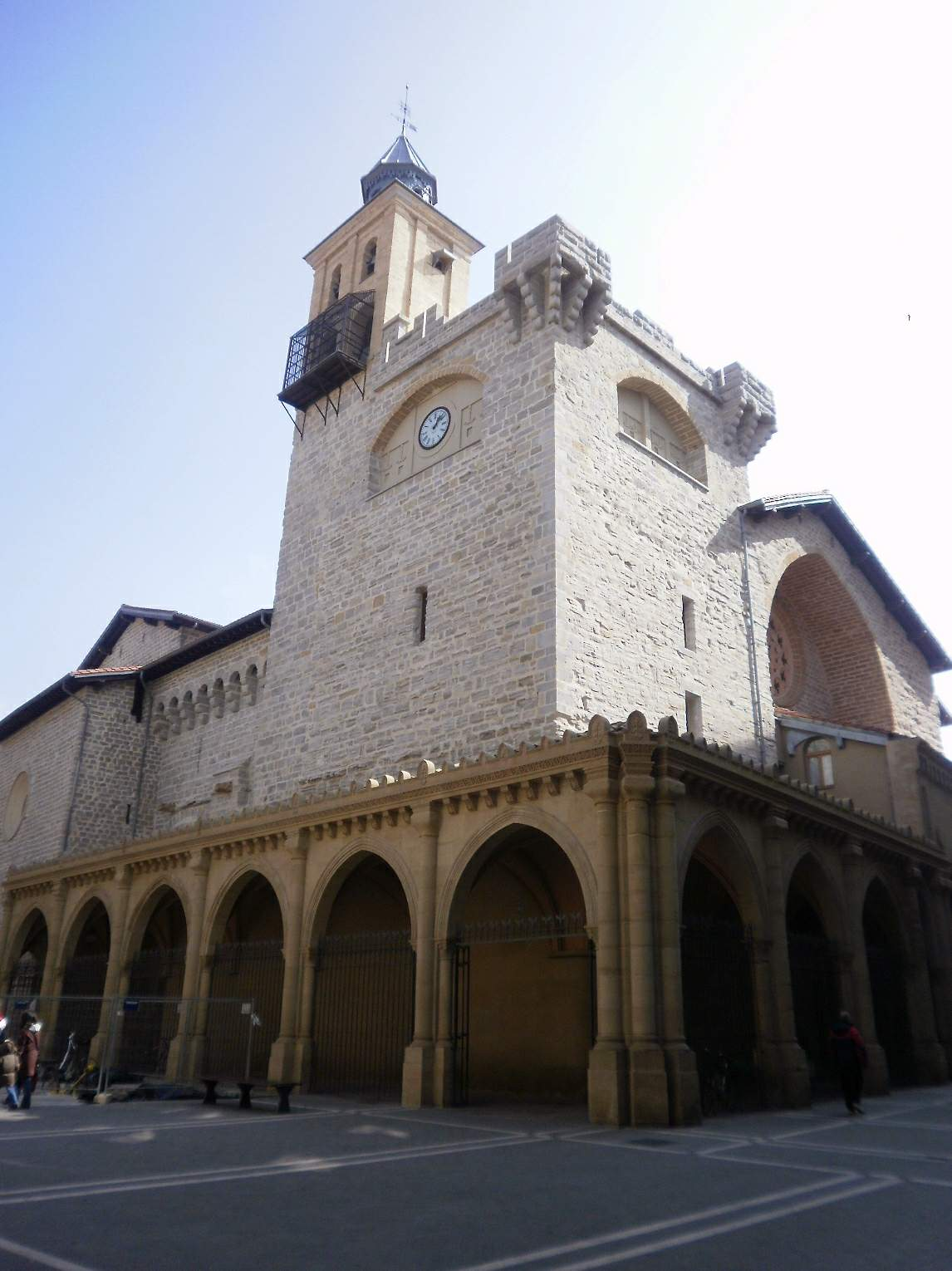
portico, San Nicholas church

Following practice in stonemasonry Morte developed his own workshop and delivered minor stone cutting works. His status changed in 1883 as he became “contratista de obras”, a building contractor responsible for construction projects. Morte's first major contract was the portico of Iglesia de San Nicolás in Pamplona, designed in eclectic style by the local architect Angel Goicoechea; it was located at the corner of San Miguel and Plazuela streets. In 1884, he was agreed by the Tudela ayuntamiento to build a municipal water reservoir, but the project ended in a lawsuit; the construction proved faulty, Morte blamed the architect and the council blamed him. The case lasted 3 years before he eventually emerged victorious. In 1888, Morte was contracted by the Tudela Jesuits to build a San Francisco Javier college in Tudela; the work was completed in 1891. In the early 1890s he was among builders hired to erect the building of Audiencia de Pamplona, today Parlamento de Navarra. In 1896, Morte started his most ambitious and prestigious contract; the Jesuits who thanks to the donation of duquesa de Villahermosa became owners of the Javier castle decided to turn it into a missionary centre. Apart from other works, Morte was contracted to build a basilica adjacent to the compound. Completion of the shrine, again designed by Goicoechea, took 5 years and the entire Morte family lived on the premises throughout the construction process.

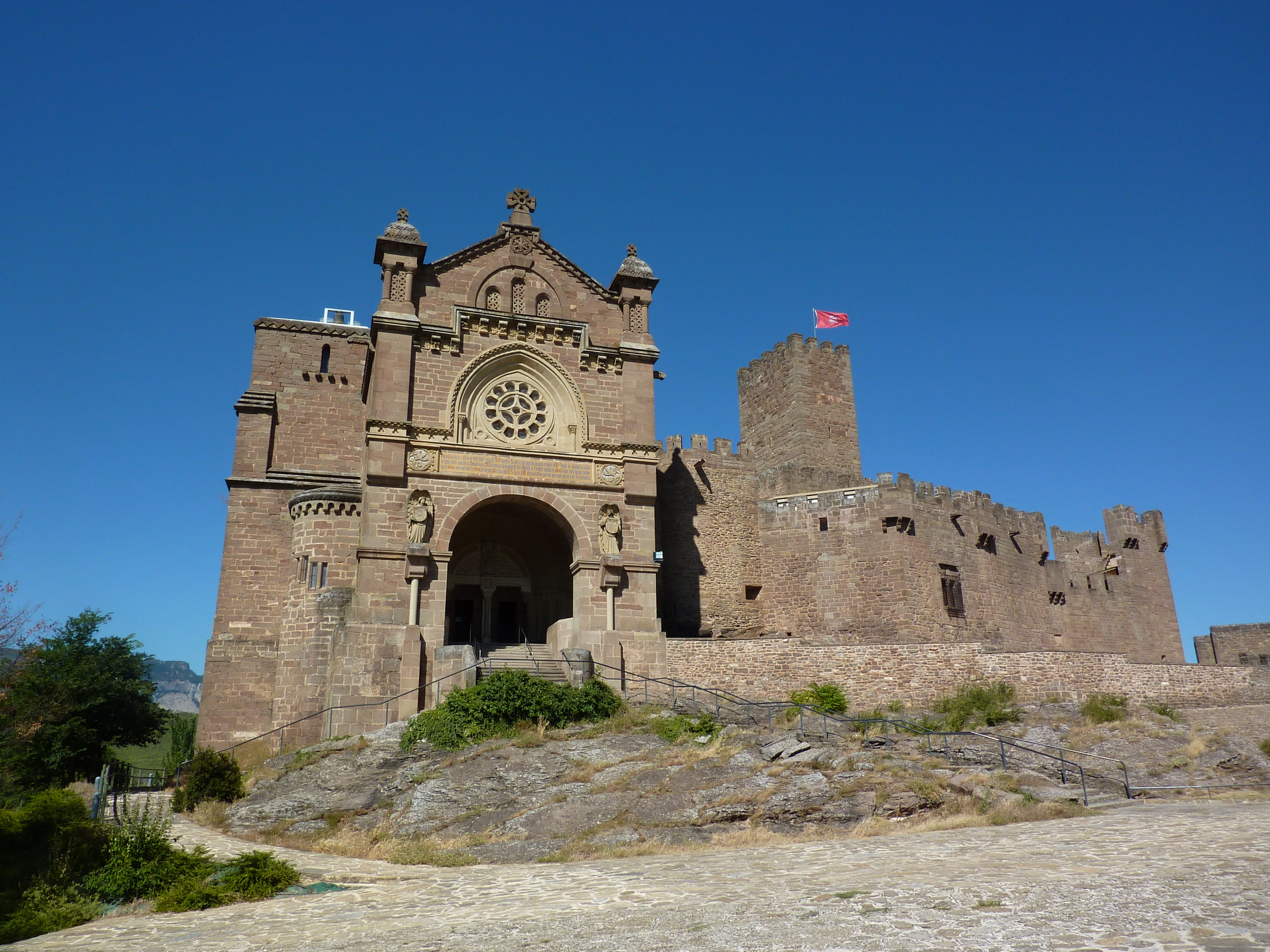
basilica and castle in Javier

The basilica in Javier turned out to be the last of major Morte’ construction projects. At the turn of the centuries he tried to diversify his commercial endeavors. In the 1890s he purchased some estates in Tudela and then rented them to French wine companies. As French vineyards suffered from the phylloxera plague, the Tudela premises served as storage and spedition centers for French wine imports from Spain. In 1903, Morte opened in Tudela a sawmill, which processed wood delivered by water from the Pyrenees; it grew into a major company and over time offered 12 types of timber. After his death it was reformatted as Sociedad Colonial de Guinea and focused on wood imported from Spanish Guinea. In 1912, Morte commenced construction of a sugar mill in Zaragoza; with the rupture of traditional sugar deliveries from Cuba, it was based on processing Ebro-grown sugar cane and as Azucarera de Luceni it proved hugely profitable. Finally, in 1917 Morte and his business partners rented some 1,700 ha of agricultural land and created Agrícola Sancho Abarca, another largely successful business. Before death Morte was a major Navarrese entrepreneur with international links, who during less than 40 years converted a small stonemasonry workshop into a diversified business conglomerate and a county industrial powerhouse.

== Carlist ==
Carlist standard

During almost 20 years following his military deeds during the Civil War, Morte was not recorded as particularly busy within Carlism, which in the 1880s was suffering from post-war crisis and fragmentation. He resumed activity in the early 1890s; in 1894, he purchased a centrally located building in Tudela and rented it to the local Círculo Católico Tradicionalista, the organization he animated himself. The premises became the local Carlist headquarters, which would operate until the 1970s. In the early 20th century it grouped some 300 members of mostly humble social background; during crisis years, e.g. when suspended by authorities, it operated as a regular cafeteria until return to original status was possible. He also turned into a key party personality in the town and county; apart from co-founding Juventud Carlista and serving as its “socio-protector” he was also president of the county party organization. In 1897 Morte entered Junta Regional de Navarra, the Navarrese party executive.

In 1897, Morte co-founded El Pensamiento Navarro, a daily which until the 1980s was the iconic party mouthpiece in the region. He remained in executive board of its managing companies, the post which later he ceded to his sons; until its disappearance the daily was controlled mostly by the Baleztena and the Morte families. In his Navarrese party engagements Morte tended to focus on the Tudela county, e.g. supporting or organizing Carlist electoral campaigns. During the 1907 and 1910 elections to the Cortes he managed to terminate the string of liberal triumphs and to ensure the success of Traditionalist candidates; afterwards the district fell under the conservative dominance.

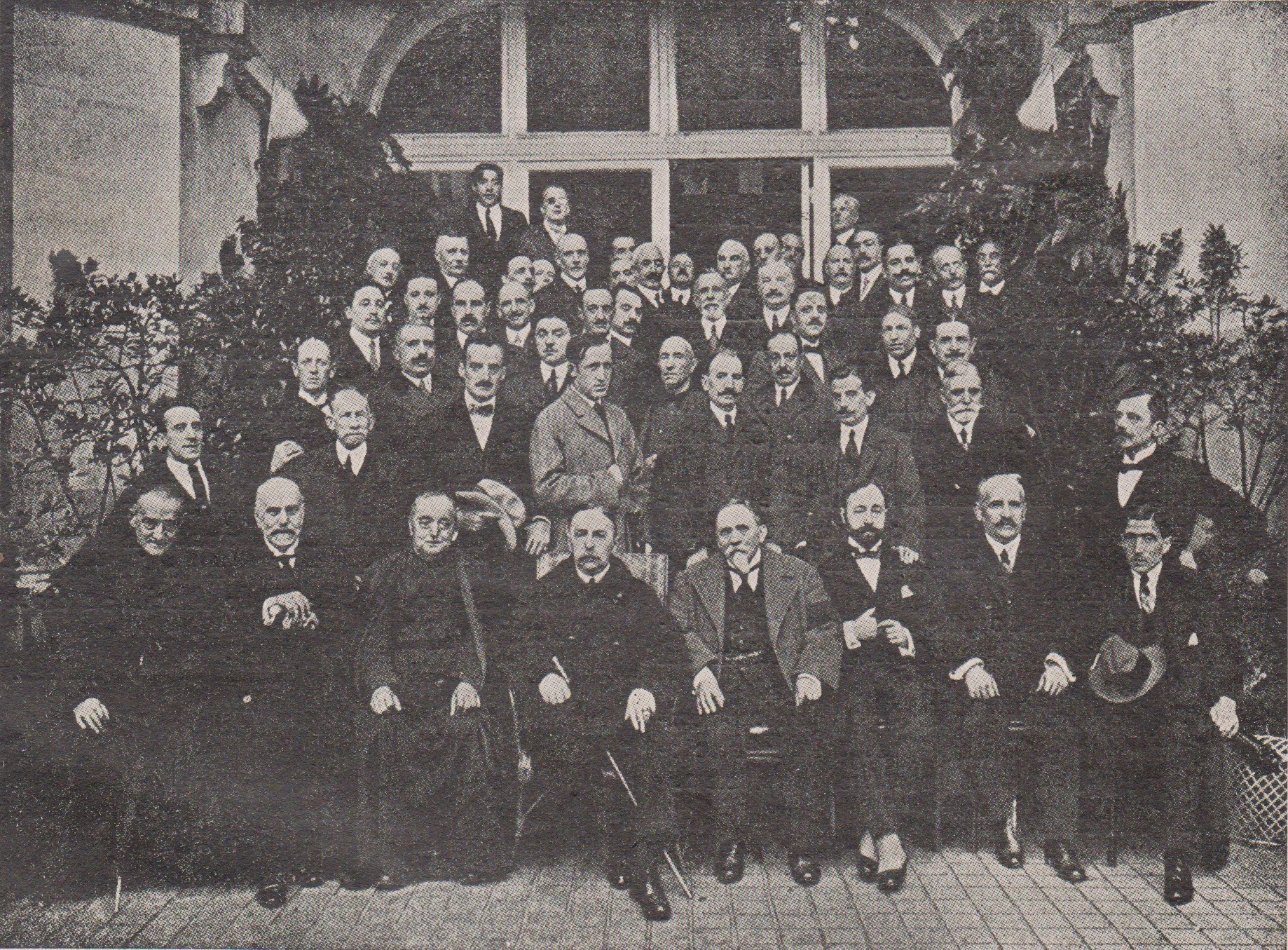
Junta de Biarritz (Morte in first row, second from right)

The conflict between the party theorist Vázquez de Mella and the claimant Don Jaime produced major breakup within Carlism and in the late 1910s membership in the Tudela círculo was decimated by defections, either to the Mellistas or to Sindicato Agrícola Tudelano. Morte remained totally loyal to his king. As Navarrese leaders like Cesareo Sanz Escartín opted for the rebels, he emerged as one of the most prestigious regional politicians who stood by Don Jaime, even though for the time being the Navarrese party leadership went to Ignacio Baleztena. In late 1919 Morte travelled to Biarritz to take part in a grand party assembly known as Magna Junta de Biarritz, supposed to point the way forward. Some time afterwards he ascended to Jefe Regional de Navarra y Rioja, the position he would hold until death; leadership in the key Carlist region in Spain elevated Morte into the very top elite of Carlist politicians of the time. Some sources claim that when the nationwide party leader Luis Hernando de Larramendi resigned in mid-1921, Don Jaime was very seriously pondering upon asking Morte to replace him. However, the claimant suspected that because of age and poor health Morte would not accept the nomination; eventually the post went to José Selva Mergelina, marqués de Villores.

== In self-government ==
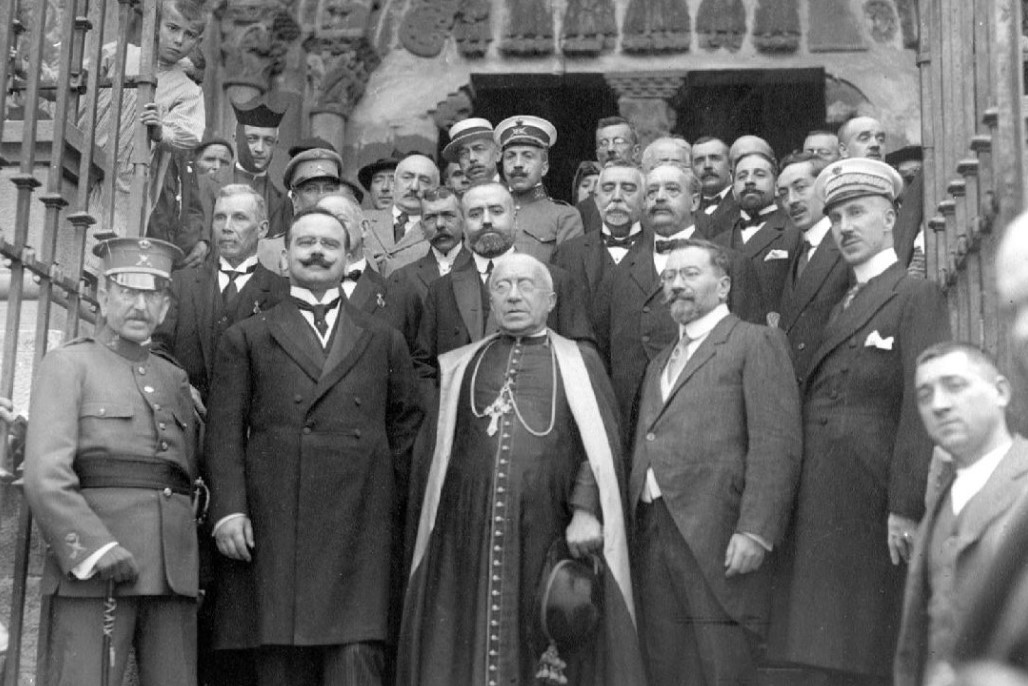
Morte as Diputación representative during a Navarrese ceremony, 1915

In the 1890s, Morte was the first time elected to the Tudela town hall; in numerous successive elections he was getting his ticket confirmed, at times as the most-voted candidate. In the county which was getting increasingly left-wing and anti-Carlist he managed to achieve a very stable political position and his tenure as concejal in the ayuntamiento lasted over 30 years. However, he has never risen to the mayor, though periodically he was holding the post of teniente de alcalde, the deputy. Though engaged in electoral campaigns to the Cortes, he has never stood for the parliament himself.

In 1913, Morte was elected for the regular 2-year term to Diputación Foral de Navarra, the regional self-government. The post of its president was by definition held by the civil governor; Morte became the vice-president. His rise from barely literate stone-cutter to holder of the highest electable post available in Navarre marked Morte's personal advancement and was sort of an exceptional achievement. Following the first tenure, because of Carlist domination dubbed “Diputación Carlista”, in 1915, he got his post confirmed in another election campaign; all in all, Morte's tenure lasted 4 years until 1917. He co-operated with 4 civil governors and in the mid-1910s remained perhaps the most influential politician in Navarre. It is not clear whether in 1917 he decided not to stand for renewal of his ticket or whether he was defeated in successive electoral campaign.

Morte is not known for specific personal initiatives and remained engaged in regular, routine administrative work of the diputación. The most lasting undertaking decided during his tenure was construction of Canal de Lodosa, a 130-km-long water route which ran parallel to the Ebro river. The project was multi-purpose. Its main objective was irrigation of lands located on the right bank of the river, located partially in Navarre and partially in La Rioja. It was also supposed to facilitate all-year-long navigation and removing problems related to operations in the rambling Ebro riverbed. However, Morte attracted some criticism as his opponents claimed he benefitted from the project personally.

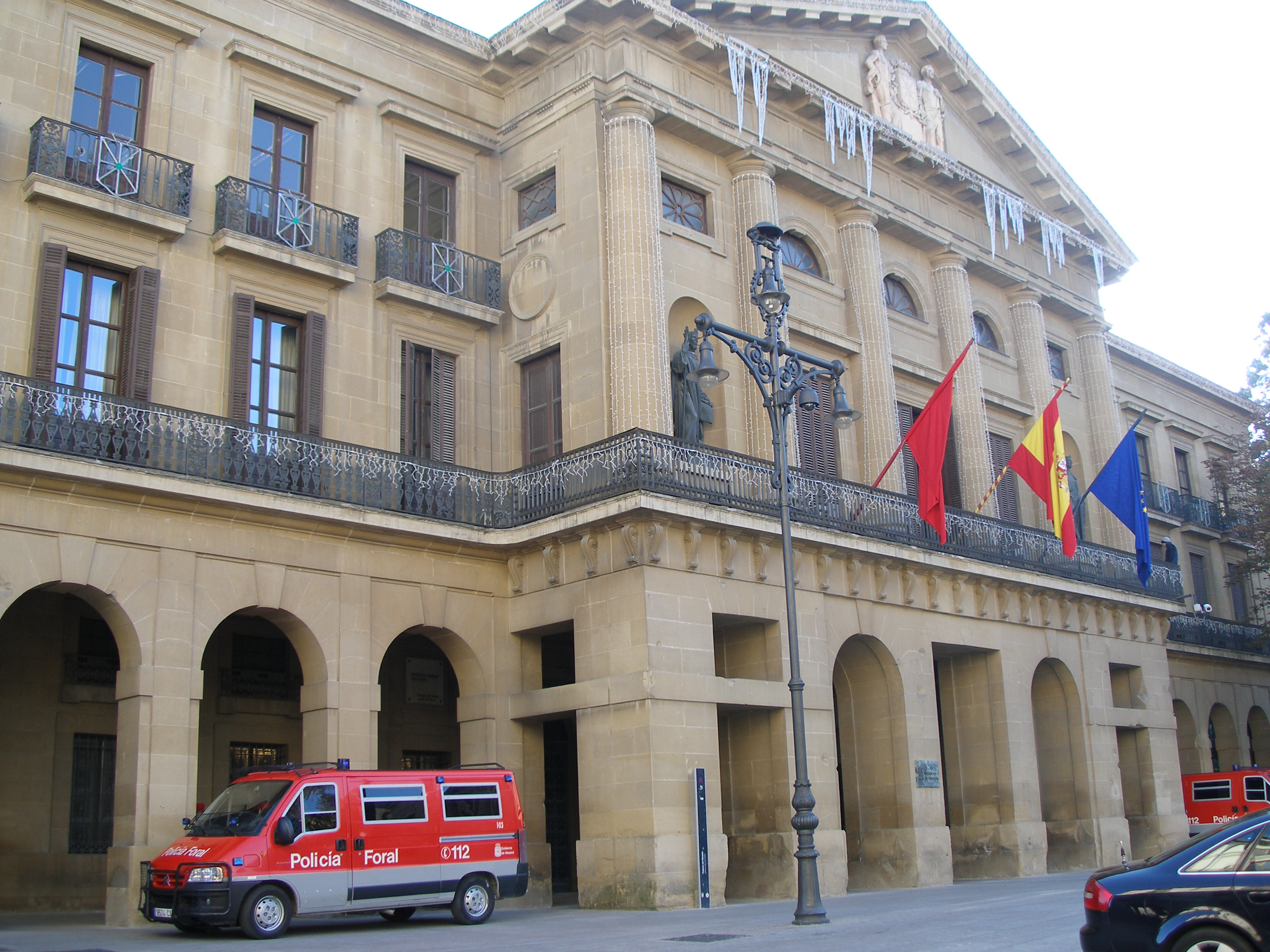
Navarrese Diputación Foral

In 1917, Morte was among co-authors of the motion which produced formal and official dedication of Diputación Foral to the Sacred Heart of Jesus; as the period was marked by growing secularism and anti-religious violence, the act stood out as a demonstration or religious conservatism prevailing in Navarre. The same year Morte initiated the motion which eventually produced the call for a so-called reintegración foral, addressed to the central Madrid government. The self-government demanded that traditional historical legal establishments, abolished in course of the 19th century as part of the homogenization process, be restored. Today this motion is viewed by some scholars as a step towards revindication of traditional Basque rights, embodied in separate provincial regulations.

== See also ==
- Traditionalism
- Carlism

== Footnotes ==
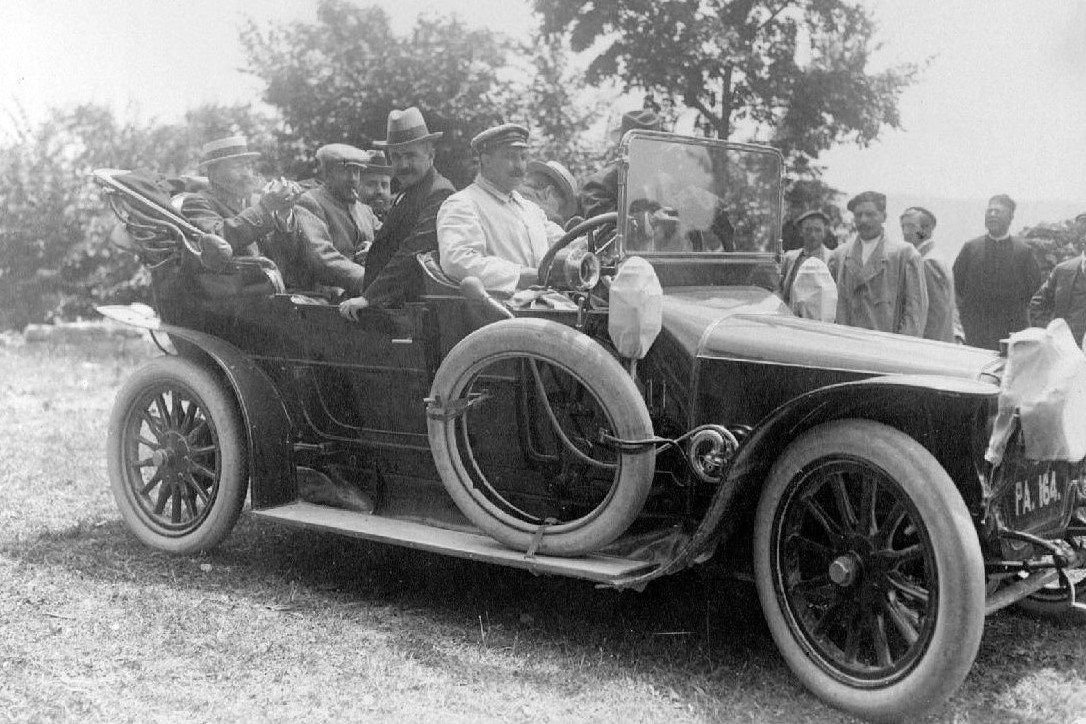
Morte with de Mella, 1915
