= Xavier, Spain =

Xavier Xabier
- Town
- Javier
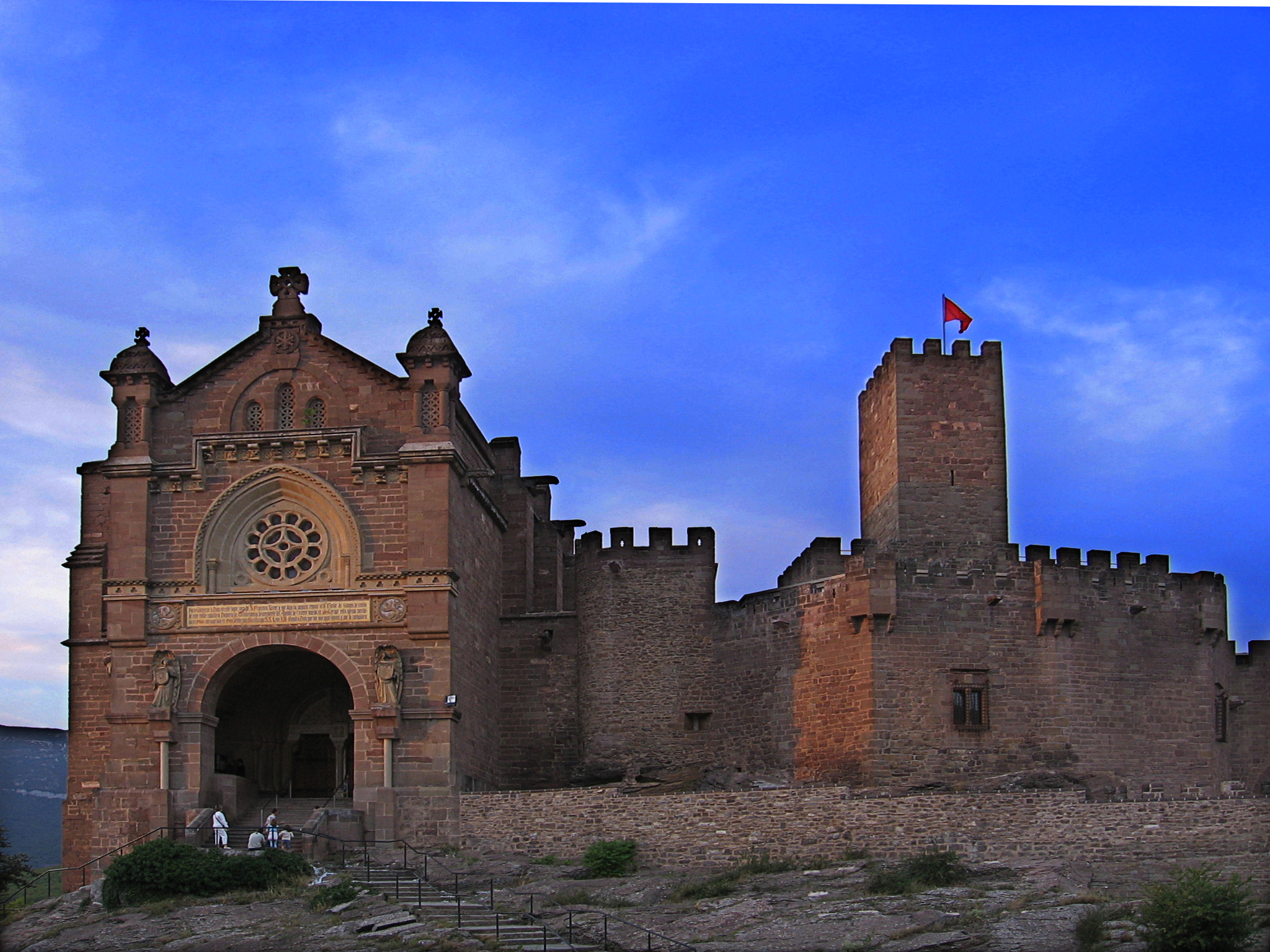
- The castle of Xavier, where the Jesuit missionary Francis Xavier was born, has been restored by the Jesuits

- Flag Coat of arms
- Etymology: "New house"
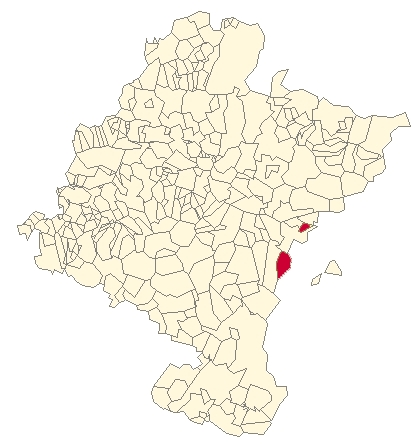
- Xavier in Navarre.

- Location within Spain
- Coordinates: 42°36′N 1°13′W
- Country: Spain
- Province: Navarre

Population
  - Total: 162

Xavier (Xabier in Basque and Navarro-Aragonese; and Javier in Castilian) is a town and municipality located in the province and autonomous community of Navarre, northern Spain, with a population of 112. The name is the Romanized form of the original Etxeberri (Basque for "new house").

It is renowned for being home to the Castle of Xavier, partially demolished in 1516 and later restored, and an attached Basilica. It is the ultimate origin of the given name Xabier / Xavier.

== Famous residents ==
- Saint Francis Xavier
