= St Nicholas' Church, Pamplona =

Coordinates: 42°48′56″N 1°38′41″W

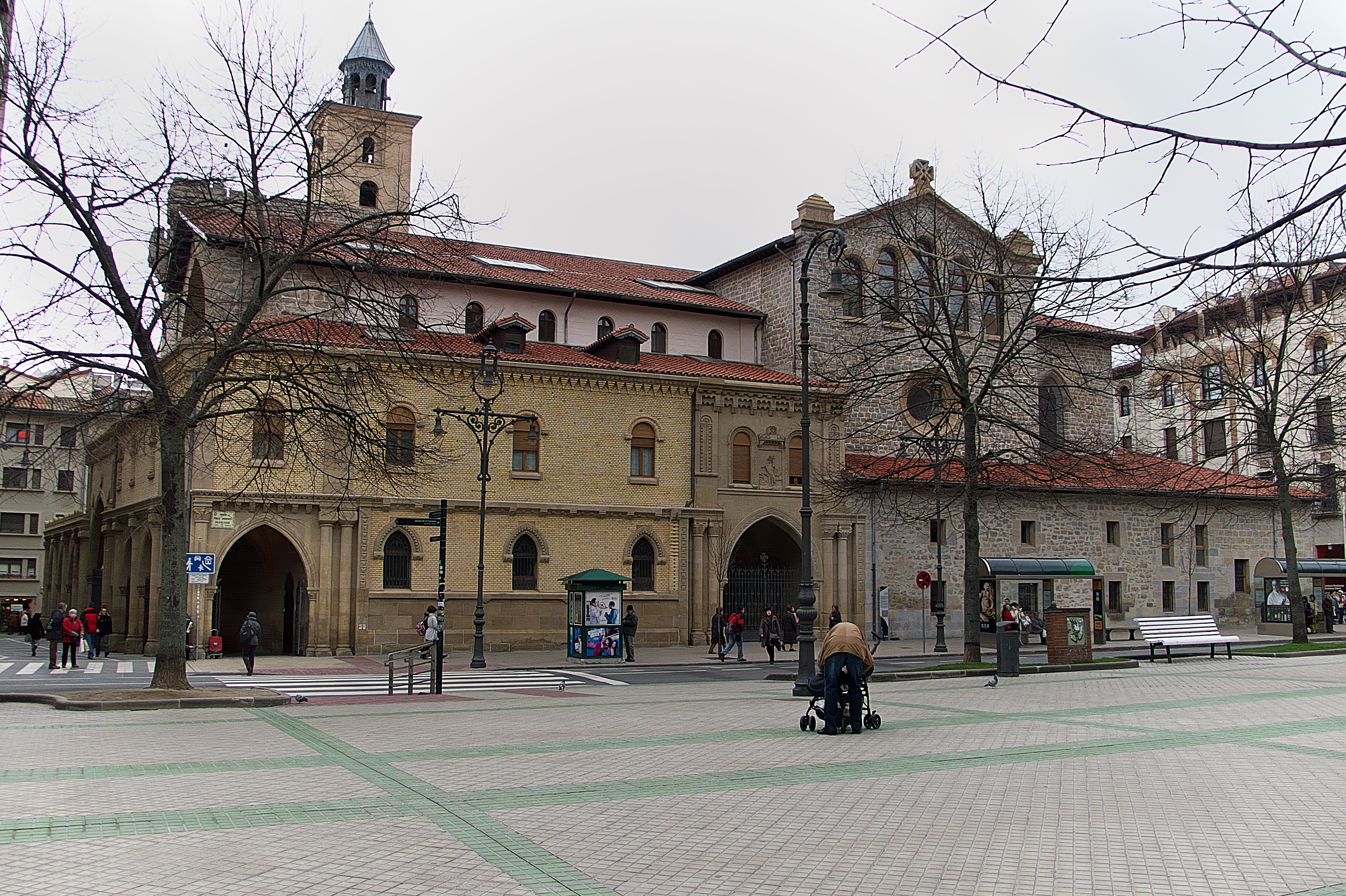
Church of St. (San) Nicolás.

San Nicolás is a historical church in Pamplona, Spain.

It was built in the 12th century not only with religious functions, but also as a defensive bastion of the quarter during the strife with the neighbouring ones of St. Saturnino and Navarrería. The military role is evident in the watch tower. In 1222 the original Romanesque church was destroyed by a fire, and was replaced by a new building, consecrated in 1231.

The interior is in Gothic style, from different phases. It houses a Baroque organ. Exteriorly, of the Gothic period only two portal are visible today, as well as the apse. The corner portico was designed by Angel Goicoechea and built by a local contractor Blas Morte in the 1880s.

== Sources ==
- Guía de Arquitectura de Pamplona y su Comarca. Pamplona: Ona Industri Gráfica. 2006. ISBN 84-611-3284-X.
