= Francis Xavier =

Navarese Catholic saint and missionary (1506–1552)

Saint Francis Xavier SJ
- A painting of Saint Francis Xavier, held in the Kobe City Museum, Japan
- Born: Francisco de Jasso y de Azpilcueta; 7 April 1506; Xavier, Kingdom of Navarre
- Died: 3 December 1552 (aged 46); Shangchuan Island, Chuanshan Archipelago, Xinning, China
- Venerated in: Catholic Church; Anglican Communion; Lutheranism
- Beatified: 25 October 1619, Rome, Papal States, by Pope Paul V
- Canonized: 12 March 1622, Rome, Papal States, by Pope Gregory XV
- Feast: 3 December
- Attributes: Cassock; surplice; stole; ferraiolo; crucifix
- Patronage: African missions; Kottar, India; Agartala, India; Ahmedabad, India; Alexandria, Louisiana; Apostleship of Prayer; Australia; Bengaluru, India; Bombay, India; Borneo; Cape Town, South Africa; China; Dinajpur, Bangladesh; Far East; Fathers of the Precious Blood; foreign missions; Freising, Germany; Goa, India; Fiji; Green Bay, Wisconsin; India; Indianapolis, Indiana; Japan; Key West, Florida; Sophia University, Tokyo, Japan; St. Francis Xavier University, Antigonish, Canada; Sucre, Bolivia; Joliet, Illinois; Kabankalan, Philippines; Kollam, India; Nasugbu, Batangas, Philippines; Abuyog, Leyte, Philippines; Alegria, Cebu, Palompon, Leyte, Philippines; Hong Kong; Macau; Diocese of Malindi, Kenya; missionaries; Missioners of the Precious Blood; Navarre, Spain; navigators; New Zealand; parish missions; plague epidemics; Propagation of the Faith; India, Zagreb, Croatia; Indonesia; Malacca, Malaysia; Brunei; Pakistan; Singapore; Sri Lanka; Kapatagan, Lanao del Norte

Styles of Francis Xavier
- Reference style: The Reverend Father
- Spoken style: Father
- Posthumous style: Saint

Francis Xavier (Note: Latin: Franciscus Xaverius; Basque: Frantzisko Xabierkoa; Navarrese Romance: Francés de Xabier; French: François Xavier; Spanish: Francisco Javier; Portuguese: Francisco Xavier) (born Francisco de Jasso y Azpilicueta; formerly de Jasso y de Xabier; 7 April 1506 – 3 December 1552), venerated as Saint Francis Xavier, was a Navarrese cleric and missionary. He co-founded the Society of Jesus and, as a representative of the Portuguese Empire, led the first Christian mission to Japan.

Born in the town of Xavier, Kingdom of Navarre, he was a companion of Ignatius of Loyola and one of the first seven Jesuits who took vows of poverty and chastity at Montmartre, Paris in 1534. He led extensive missionary work across Asia, primarily within the Portuguese Empire in the East, and played a significant role in the evangelization of early modern India, particularly through his activities in Portuguese India. In 1546, Francis Xavier wrote to King John III of Portugal proposing measures to strengthen the Christian faith in Goa. Some historians interpret this letter as a request for the establishment of the Goan Inquisition, while others contend that he instead called for the appointment of a special minister dedicated solely to promoting Christianity in Goa.

As a representative of the King of Portugal, he was the first major Christian missionary to venture into Borneo, the Maluku Islands, Japan, and other areas. In those areas, struggling to learn the local languages and in the face of opposition, he had less success than he had enjoyed in India. Xavier also extended his mission to Ming China, where he died on Shangchuan Island.

He was beatified by Pope Paul V on 25 October 1619 and canonized by Pope Gregory XV on 12 March 1622. In 1624, he was made co-patron of Navarre. Known as the "Apostle of the Indies", "Apostle of the Far East", "Apostle of China" and "Apostle of Japan", he is considered to be one of the greatest missionaries since Paul the Apostle. In 1927, Pope Pius XI published the decree Apostolicorum in Missionibus naming Francis Xavier, along with Thérèse of Lisieux, co-patron of all foreign missions. He is now co-patron saint of Navarre, along with Saint Fermin. The "Day of Navarre" marks the anniversary of Francis Xavier's death, on 3 December.

== Early life ==
Francis Xavier was born in the Castle of Xavier, in the Kingdom of Navarre, on 7 April 1506 into an influential noble family. He was the youngest son of Don Juan de Jasso y Atondo, Lord of Idocín, president of the Royal Council of the Kingdom of Navarre, and seneschal of the Castle of Xavier, a doctor in law by the University of Bologna, belonging to a prosperous noble family of Saint-Jean-Pied-de-Port, later privy counsellor and finance minister to King John III of Navarre.

His mother was Doña María de Azpilcueta y Aznárez, sole heiress to the Castle of Xavier, related to the theologian and philosopher Martín de Azpilcueta. His brother Miguel de Jasso, later known as Miguel de Javier, became Lord of Xavier and Idocín at the death of his parents, a direct ancestor of the Counts of Javier. Basque and Romance (Note: Navarro-Aragonese, called Romance at this time was also a language spoken in the surrounding area. Romance languages are the result of the changes to spoken Latin through the centuries. Hispanic Romance languages were born in the North of the Peninsula (Galician, Leonese, Castilian, Navarro-Aragonese, Catalan).) were his two mother tongues.

In 1512, Ferdinand, King of Aragon and regent of Castile, invaded Navarre, initiating a war that lasted over 18 years. In 1515, Francis's father died when Francis was only nine years old. In 1516, Francis's brothers participated in a failed Navarrese-French attempt to expel the Spanish invaders from the kingdom. The Spanish Governor, Cardinal Cisneros, confiscated the family lands, demolished the outer wall, the gates, and two towers of the family castle, and filled in the moat. The height of the keep was reduced by half. Only the family residence inside the castle was left. In 1522, one of Francis's brothers participated with 200 Navarrese nobles in dogged but failed resistance against the Castilian Count of Miranda in Amaiur, Baztan, the last Navarrese territorial position south of the Pyrenees.

In 1525, Francis went to study in Paris at the Collège Sainte-Barbe, University of Paris, where he spent the next eleven years. In the early days he acquired some reputation as an athlete and a high-jumper.

In 1529, Francis shared lodgings with his friend Pierre Favre. A new student, Ignatius of Loyola, came to room with them. At 38, Ignatius was much older than Pierre and Francis, who were both 23 at the time. Ignatius convinced Pierre to become a priest, but was unable to convince Francis, who had aspirations of worldly advancement. At first, Francis regarded the new lodger as a joke and was sarcastic about his efforts to convert students.

When Pierre left their lodgings to visit his family and Ignatius was alone with Francis, he was able to slowly break down Francis's resistance. According to most biographies Ignatius is said to have posed the question: "What will it profit a man to gain the whole world, and lose his own soul?" However, according to James Broderick such method is not characteristic of Ignatius and there is no evidence that he employed it at all.

In 1530, Francis received the degree of Master of Arts, and afterwards taught Aristotelian philosophy at the Collège de Beauvais, University of Paris.

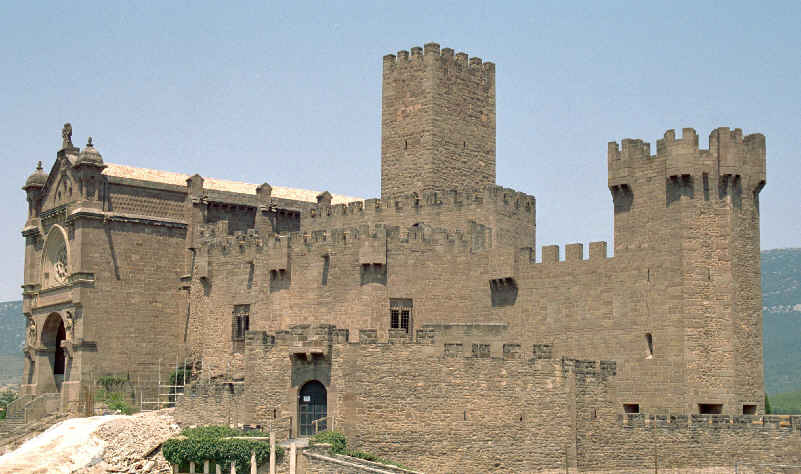
The castle of the Xavier family was later acquired by the Society of Jesus.

== Missionary work ==
On 15 August 1534, seven students met in a crypt beneath the Church of Saint Denis (now Saint Pierre de Montmartre), on the hill of Montmartre, overlooking Paris. They were Francis, Ignatius of Loyola, Alfonso Salmeron, Diego Laínez, Nicolás Bobadilla from Spain, Peter Faber from Savoy, and Simão Rodrigues from Portugal. They made private vows of poverty, chastity, and obedience to the Pope, and also vowed to go to the Holy Land to convert infidels. Francis began his study of theology in 1534 and was ordained on 24 June 1537.

In 1539, after long discussions, Ignatius drew up a formula for a new religious order, the Society of Jesus (the Jesuits). Ignatius's plan for the order was approved by Pope Paul III in 1540.

In 1540, King John III of Portugal had Pedro Mascarenhas, Portuguese ambassador to the Holy See, request Jesuit missionaries to spread the faith in his new possessions in India, where the king believed that Christian values were eroding among the Portuguese. After successive appeals to the Pope asking for missionaries for the East Indies under the Padroado agreement, John III was encouraged by Diogo de Gouveia, rector of the Collège Sainte-Barbe, to recruit the newly graduated students who had established the Society of Jesus.

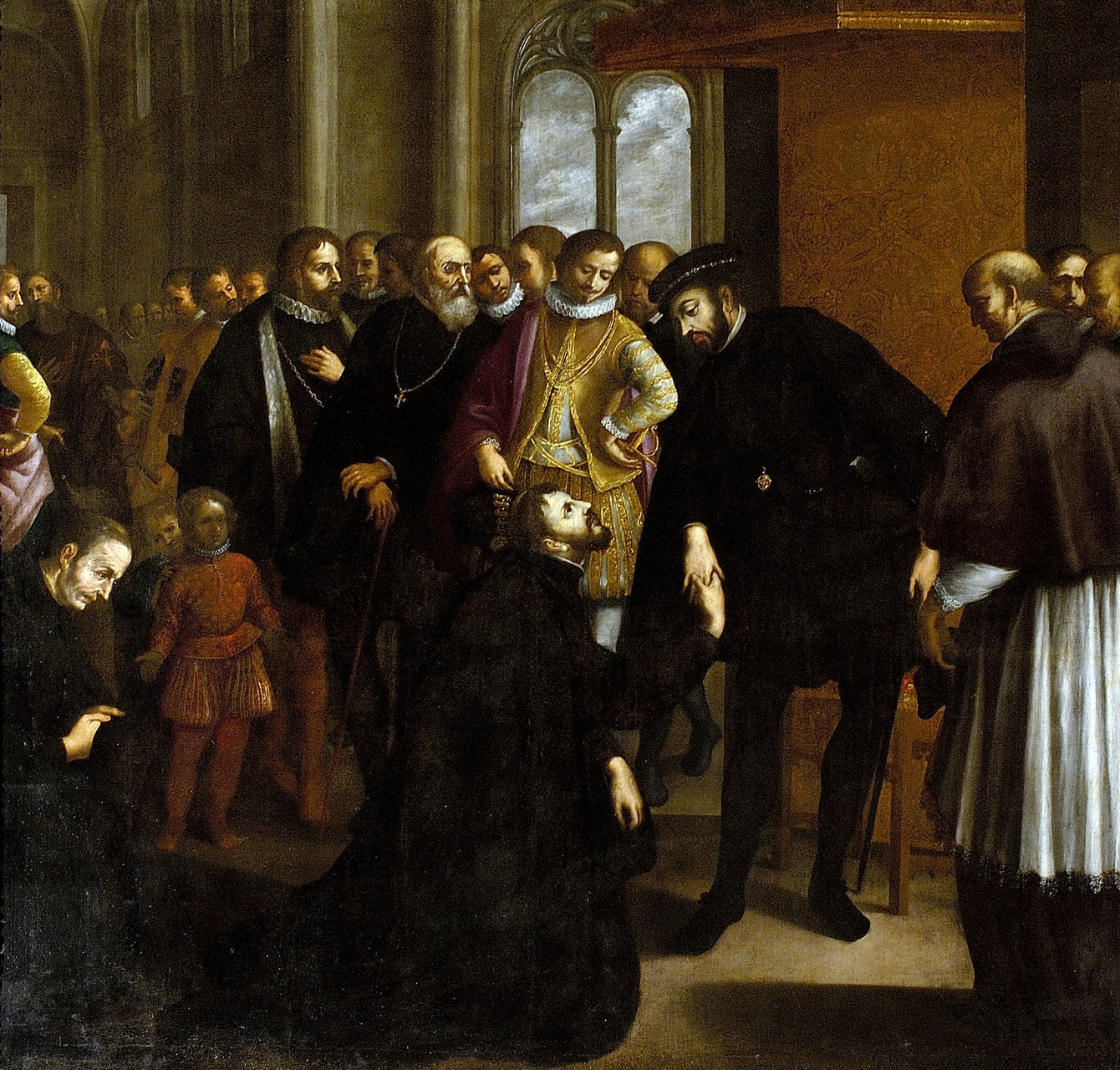
Francisco Xavier taking leave of John III of Portugal for an expedition

Ignatius promptly appointed Nicholas Bobadilla and Simão Rodrigues. At the last moment, however, Bobadilla became seriously ill. With some hesitance and uneasiness, Ignatius asked Francis to go in Bobadilla's place. Thus, Francis Xavier began his life as the first Jesuit missionary almost accidentally.

Leaving Rome on 15 March 1540, in the Ambassador's train, Francis took with him a breviary, a catechism, and De institutione bene vivendi per exempla sanctorum (Instructions for a Virtuous Life According to the Examples of the Saints) by Croatian humanist Marko Marulić, a Latin book that had become popular in the Counter-Reformation. According to a 1549 letter of F. Balthasar Gago from Goa, it was the only book that Francis read or studied. Francis reached Lisbon in June 1540 and, four days after his arrival, he and Rodrigues were summoned to a private audience with King John and Queen Catherine.

Francis Xavier was the first Jesuit missionary in Asia. He devoted much of his life to missions in Asia, mainly in four centres: Malacca, Amboina and Ternate (in the Maluku Islands of Indonesia), Japan, and off-shore China. His growing information about new places indicated to him that he had to go to what he understood were centres of influence for the whole region. China loomed large from his days in India. Japan was particularly attractive because of its culture. For him, these areas were interconnected; they could not be evangelised separately.

=== In India ===
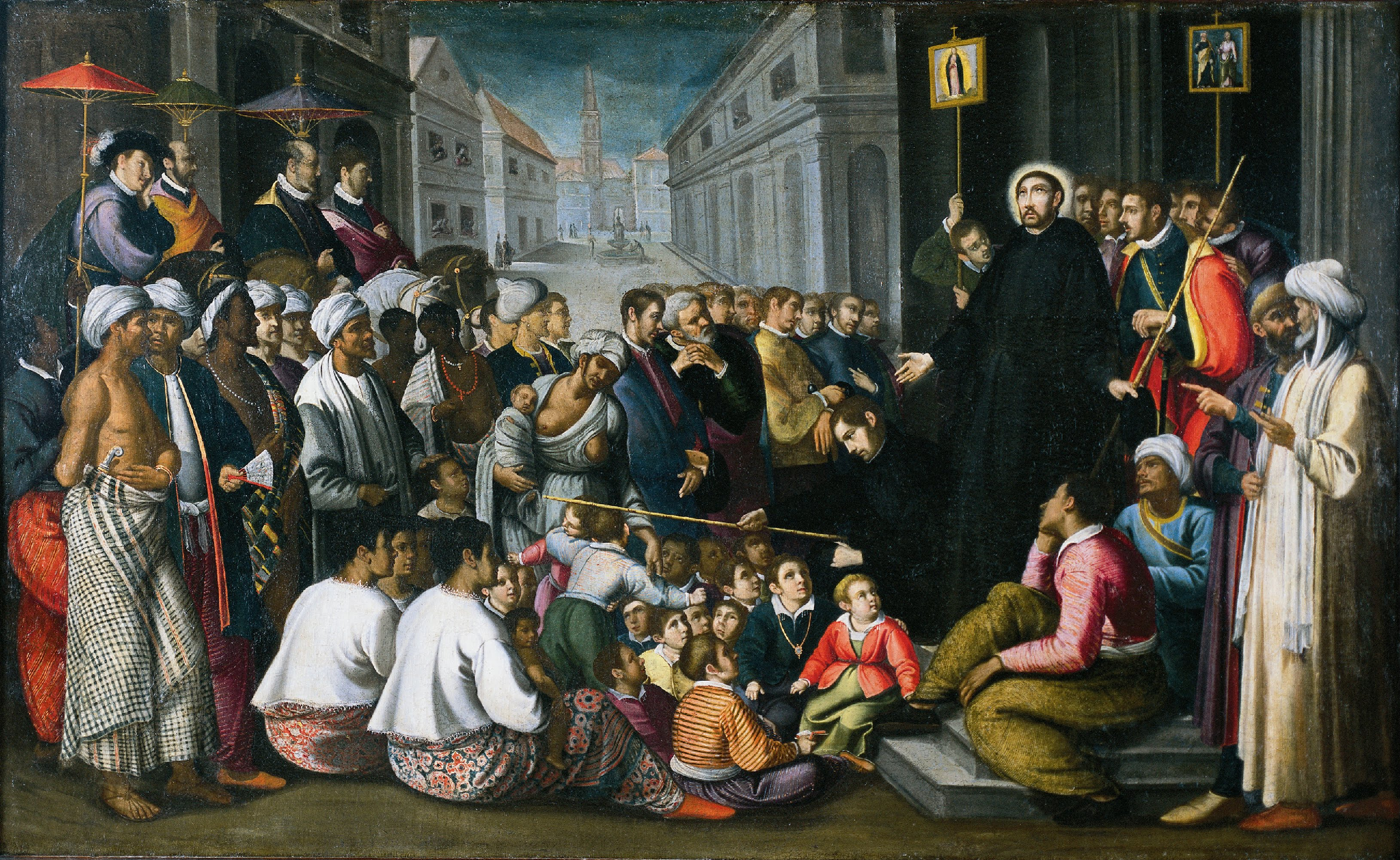
Saint Francis Xavier preaching in Goa (1610), by André Reinoso

Francis Xavier left Lisbon on 7 April 1541, his thirty-fifth birthday, along with two other Jesuits and the new viceroy Martim Afonso de Sousa, on board the Santiago. As he departed, Francis was given a brief from the pope appointing him apostolic nuncio to the East. From August until March 1542 he remained in Portuguese Mozambique, and arrived in Goa, then the capital of Portuguese India, on 6 May 1542, thirteen months after leaving Lisbon.

The Portuguese, following quickly on the great voyages of discovery, had established themselves at Goa thirty years earlier. Francis's primary mission, as ordered by King John III, was to restore Christianity among the Portuguese settlers. According to Teotonio R. DeSouza, recent critical accounts indicate that apart from the posted civil servants, "the great majority of those who were dispatched as 'discoverers' were the riff-raff of Portuguese society, picked up from Portuguese jails." Nor did the soldiers, sailors, or merchants come to do missionary work, and Imperial policy permitted the outflow of disaffected nobility. Many of the arrivals formed liaisons with local women and adopted Indian culture. Missionaries often wrote against the "scandalous and undisciplined" behaviour of their fellow Christians.

The Christian population had churches, clergy, and a bishop, but there were few preachers and no priests beyond the walls of Goa. Xavier decided that he must begin by instructing the Portuguese themselves, and gave much of his time to the teaching of children. The first five months he spent in preaching and ministering to the sick in the hospitals. After that, he walked through the streets ringing a bell to summon the children and servants to catechism. He was invited to head Saint Paul's College, a pioneer seminary for the education of secular priests, which became the first Jesuit headquarters in Asia.

Conversion efforts

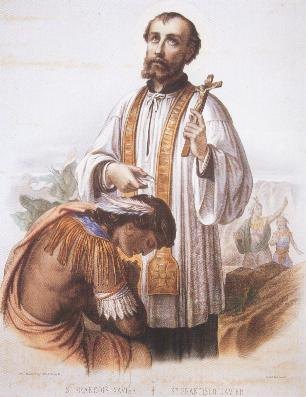
Conversion of the Paravars by Francis Xavier in South India, in a 19th-century coloured lithograph

Xavier soon learned that along the Pearl Fishery Coast, which extends from Cape Comorin on the southern tip of India to the island of Mannar, off Ceylon (Sri Lanka), there was a Jāti of people called Paravas. Many of them had been baptised ten years before, merely to please the Portuguese who had helped them against the Moors, but remained uninstructed in the faith. Accompanied by several native clerics from the seminary at Goa, he set sail for Cape Comorin in October 1542.

He taught those who had already been baptised and preached to those who were not. His efforts with the high-caste Brahmins remained unavailing. The Brahmin and Muslim authorities in Travancore opposed Xavier with violence; time and again his hut was burned down over his head, and once he saved his life only by hiding among the branches of a large tree.

He devoted almost three years to the work of preaching to the people of southern India and Ceylon, converting many. He built nearly 40 churches along the coast, including St. Stephen's Church, Kombuthurai, mentioned in his letters dated 1544.

During this time, he visited the tomb of Thomas the Apostle in Mylapore, now part of Madras/Chennai then in Portuguese India. He set his sights eastward in 1545 and planned a missionary journey to Makassar on the island of Celebes, today's Indonesia.

As the first Jesuit in India, Francis had difficulty achieving much success in his missionary trips. His successors, such as Roberto de Nobili, Matteo Ricci, and Constanzo Beschi, attempted to convert the noblemen first as a means to influence more people, while Francis had initially interacted most with the lower classes. Later in Japan, Francis changed tack by paying tribute to the Emperor and seeking an audience with him.

The voyages of Saint Francis Xavier

=== Southeast Asia ===
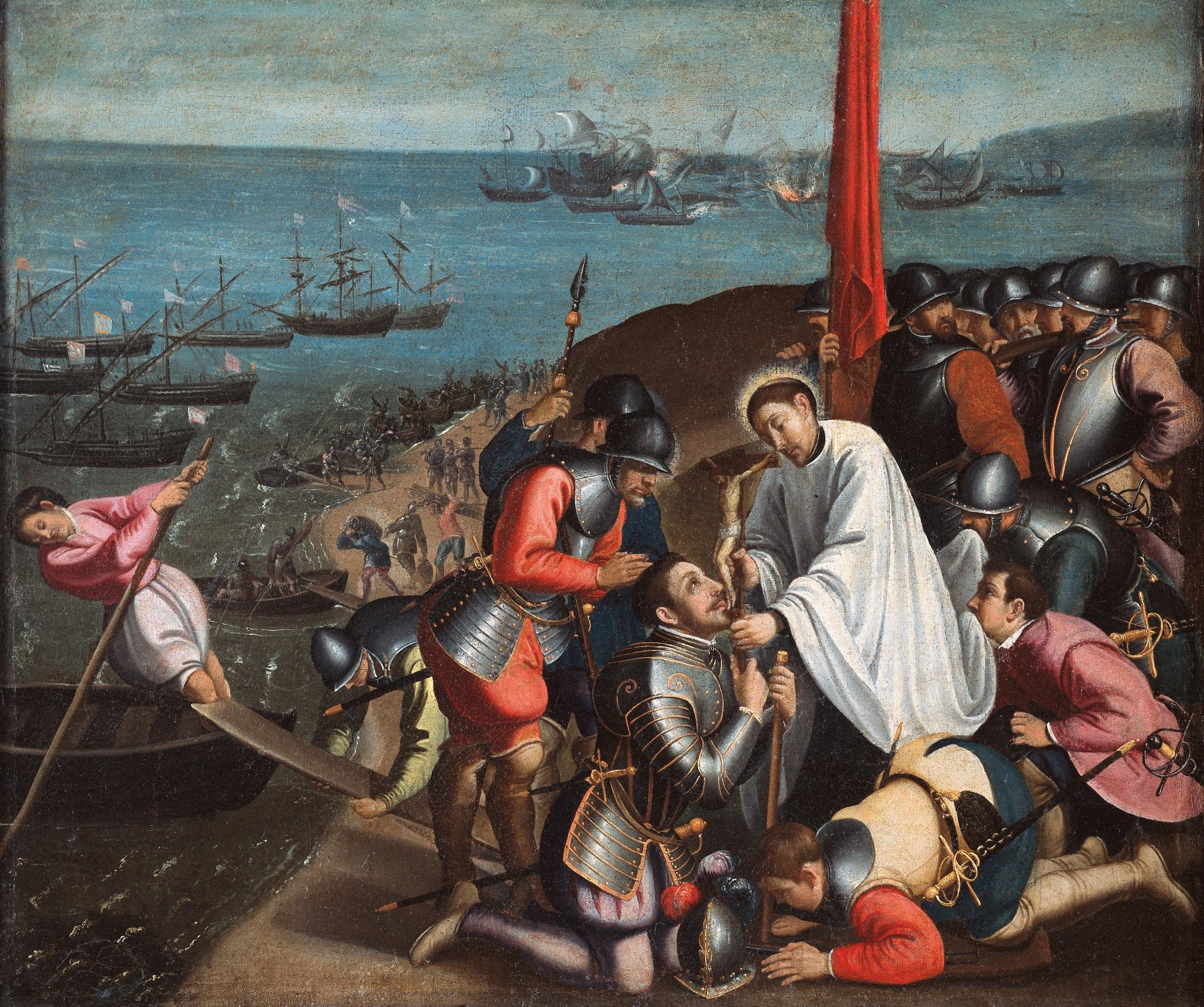
Saint Francis Xavier Inspiring Portuguese Troops Against the Acehnese Pirates by André Reinoso (1619)

Arrived of Cavite in the spring of 1545, Xavier started for Portuguese Malacca. He laboured there for the last months of that year. About January 1546, Xavier left Malacca for the Maluku Islands, where the Portuguese had some settlements. For a year and a half, he preached the Gospel there. He went first to Ambon Island, where he stayed until mid-June. He then visited the other Maluku Islands, including Ternate, Baranura, and Morotai.

Shortly after Easter 1547, he returned to Ambon Island. A few months later he returned to Malacca. While there, Malacca was attacked by the Acehnese from Sumatra. Through preaching, Xavier inspired the Portuguese to seek battle, achieving a victory at the Battle of Perlis River, despite being heavily outnumbered.

=== Japan ===
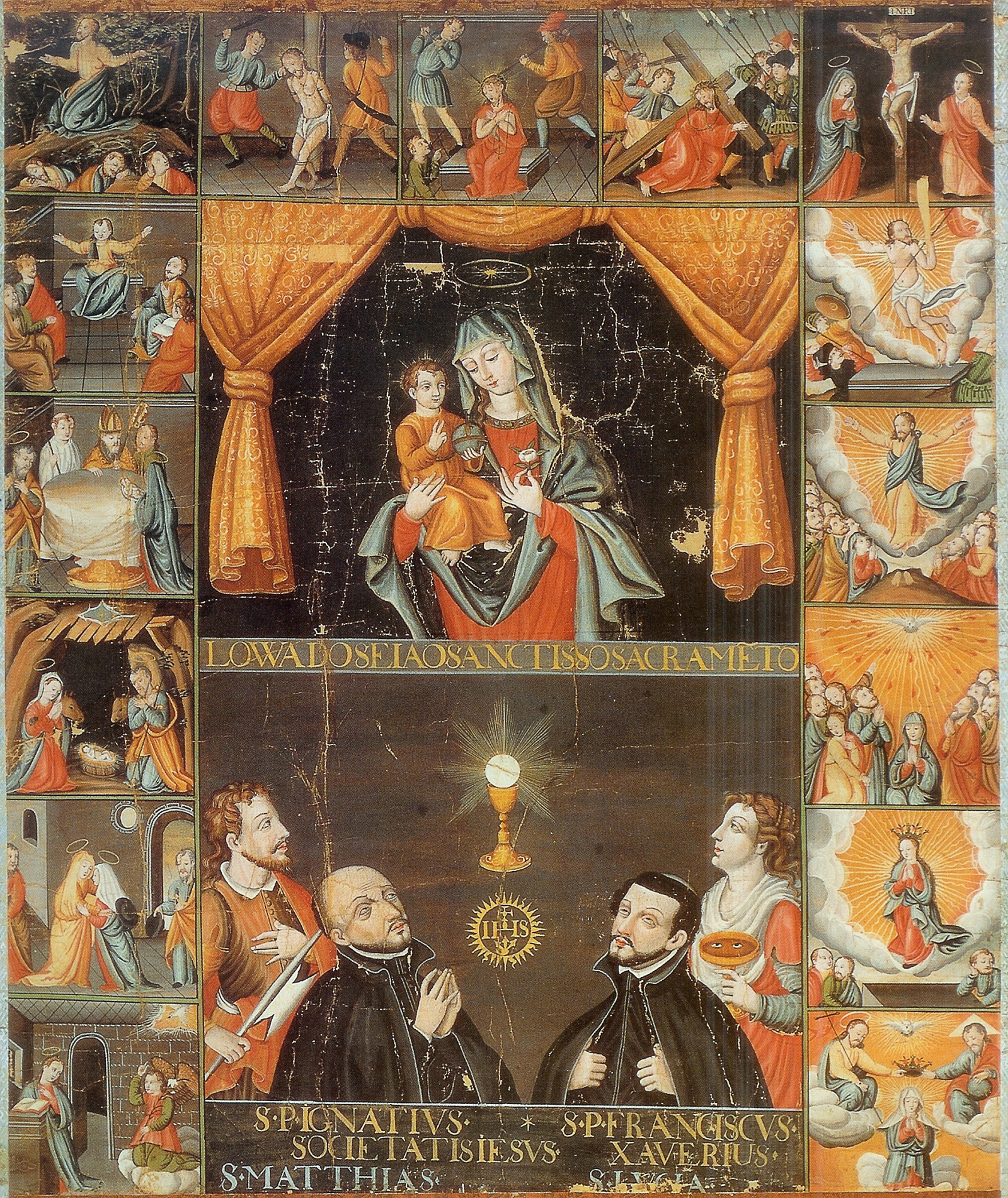
Virgin Mary with Infant Jesus and Her Fifteen Mysteries by an unknown Japanese artist, c. 1600. Bottom centre: Ignatius of Loyola (left) and Francis Xavier (right)

In Malacca in December 1547, Francis Xavier met a Japanese man named Anjirō. Anjirō had heard of Francis in 1545 and had travelled from Kagoshima to Malacca to meet him. Having been charged with murder, Anjirō had fled Japan. He told Francis extensively about his former life, and the customs and culture of his homeland. Anjirō became the first Japanese Christian and adopted the name 'Paulo de Santa Fe'. He later helped Xavier as a mediator and interpreter for the mission to Japan that now seemed much more possible.

In January 1548 Francis returned to Goa to attend to his responsibilities as superior of the mission there. The next 15 months were occupied with various journeys and administrative measures. He left Goa on 15 April 1549, stopped at Malacca, and visited Canton. He was accompanied by Anjirō, two other Japanese men, Father Cosme de Torres and Brother Juan Fernández. He had taken with him presents for the "King of Japan" since he intended to introduce himself as the Apostolic Nuncio.

Europeans had already visited Japan. The Portuguese first landed in 1543 on the island of Tanegashima, where they introduced matchlock firearms to Japan.

From Amboina, he wrote to his companions in Europe: "I asked a Portuguese merchant, ... who had been for many days in Anjirō's country of Japan, to give me ... some information on that land and its people from what he had seen and heard. ...All the Portuguese merchants coming from Japan tell me that if I go there I shall do great service for God our Lord, more than with the pagans of India, for they are a very reasonable people." (To His Companions Residing in Rome, From Cochin, 20 January 1548, no. 18, p. 178).

Francis Xavier reached Japan on 27 July 1549, with Anjirō and three other Jesuits, but he was not permitted to enter any port his ship arrived at until 15 August, when he went ashore at Kagoshima, the principal port of Satsuma Province on the island of Kyūshū. As a representative of the Portuguese king, he was received in a friendly manner. Shimazu Takahisa (1514–1571), daimyō of Satsuma, gave a friendly reception to Francis on 29 September 1549, but in the following year he forbade the conversion of his subjects to Christianity under penalty of death; Christians in Kagoshima could not be given any catechism in the following years. The Portuguese missionary Pedro de Alcáçova would later write in 1554:

In Cangoxima, the first place Father Master Francisco stopped at, there were a good number of Christians, although there was no one there to teach them; the shortage of labourers prevented the whole kingdom from becoming Christian.

— Pacheco 1974, pp. 477–480

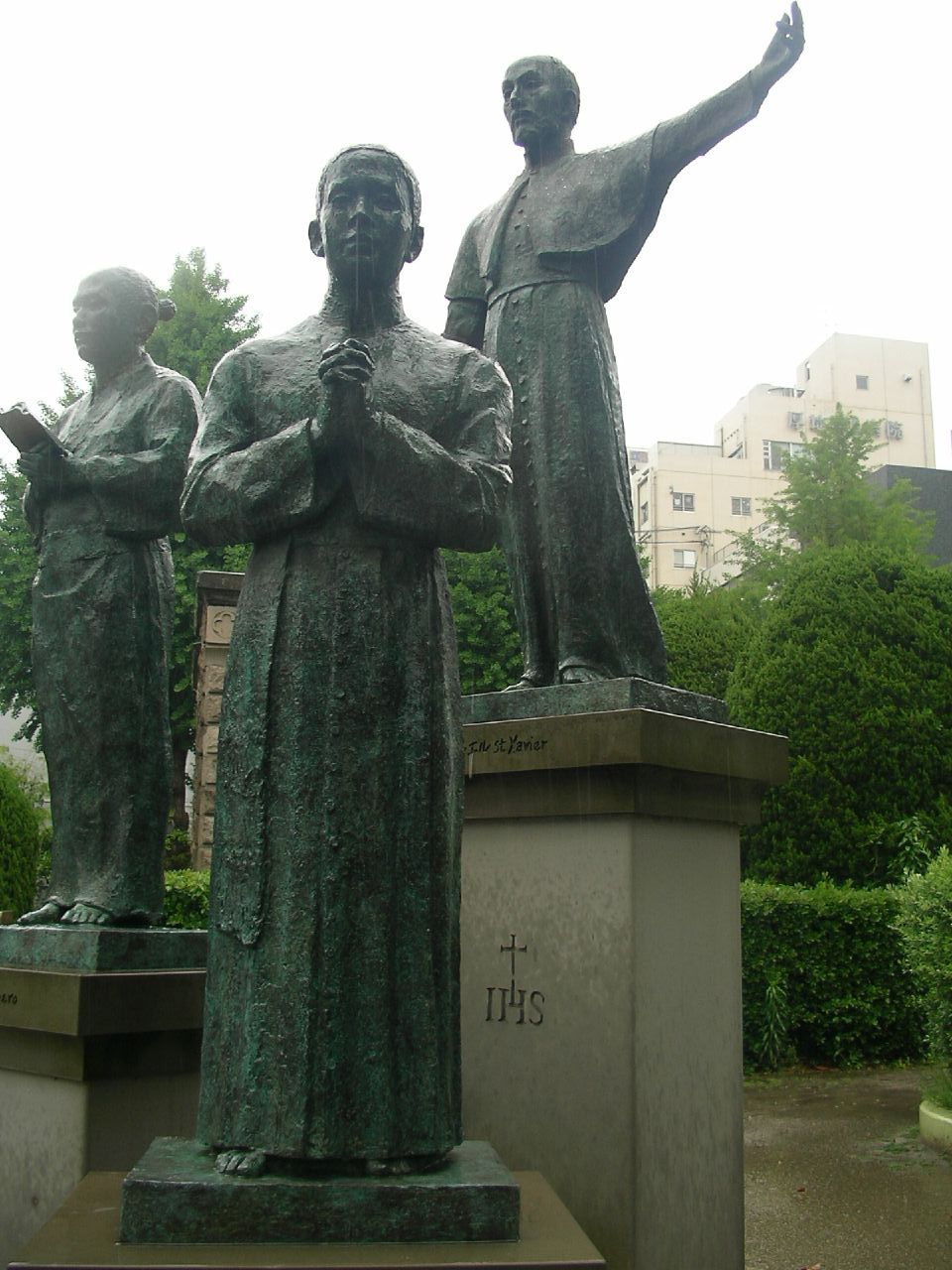
'Statue of Francisco Xavier, Yajiro & Bernardo in Kagoshima in Xavier Park, Kagoshima

Francis was the first Jesuit to go to Japan as a missionary. He brought with him paintings of the Madonna and the Madonna and Child. These paintings were used to help teach the Japanese about Christianity. There was a huge language barrier as Japanese was unlike other languages the missionaries had previously encountered. For a long time, Francis struggled to learn the language. He was hosted by Anjirō's family until October 1550. From October to December 1550, he resided in Yamaguchi. Shortly before Christmas, he left for Kyoto but failed to meet with Emperor Go-Nara. He returned to Yamaguchi in March 1551, where the daimyō of the province gave him permission to preach.

Having learned that evangelical poverty did not have the appeal in Japan that it had in Europe and in India, he decided to change his approach. Hearing after a time that a Portuguese ship had arrived at a port in the province of Bungo in Kyushu and that the prince there would like to see him, Xavier now set out southward. The Jesuit, in a fine cassock, surplice, and stole, was attended by thirty gentlemen and as many servants, all in their best clothes.

Five of them bore on cushions valuable articles, including a portrait of Our Lady and a pair of velvet slippers, not for the prince, but solemn offerings to Xavier, to impress the onlookers with his eminence. Handsomely dressed, with his companions acting as attendants, he presented himself before Oshindono, the ruler of Nagate, and as a representative of the great Kingdom of Portugal, offered him letters and presents: a musical instrument, a watch, and other attractive objects which had been given him by the authorities in India for the emperor.

For forty-five years the Jesuits were the only missionaries in Asia, but the Franciscans began proselytizing in Asia, as well. Christian missionaries were later forced into exile, along with their assistants. However, some were able to stay behind. Christianity was then kept underground so as to not be persecuted.

The Japanese people were not easily converted. Many of the people were already Buddhist or Shinto. Francis tried to combat the reservations of some of the Japanese. Many mistakenly interpreted Catholic doctrine as teaching that demons had been created evil, and they thus concluded the God who had created them could not be good. Much of Francis' preaching was devoted to providing answers to this and other such challenges. In the course of these discussions, Francis grew to respect the rationality and general literacy of those Japanese people whom he encountered. He expressed optimism at the prospect of converting the country.

Xavier was welcomed by the Shingon monks since he used the word Dainichi for the Christian God; attempting to adapt the concept to local traditions. As Xavier learned more about the religious nuances of the word, he changed to Deusu from the Latin and Portuguese Deus. The monks later realised that Xavier was preaching a rival religion and grew more resistant towards his attempts at conversion.

The Altar of St. Francis Xavier Parish in Nasugbu, Batangas, Philippines. Saint Francis is the principal patron of the town, together with Our Lady of Escalera.

With the passage of time, his sojourn in Japan could be considered somewhat fruitful as attested by congregations established in Hirado, Yamaguchi, and Bungo. Xavier worked for more than two years in Japan and saw his successor-Jesuits established. He then decided to return to India. Historians debate the exact path by which he returned, but from evidence attributed to the captain of his ship, he may have travelled through Tanegeshima and Minato, and avoided Kagoshima because of the hostility of the daimyo.

=== China ===
During his trip from Japan back to India, a tempest forced him to stop on an island near Guangzhou, Guangdong, China, where he met Diogo Pereira, a rich merchant and an old friend from Cochin. Pereira showed him a letter from Portuguese prisoners in Guangzhou, asking for a Portuguese ambassador to speak to the Jiajing Emperor on their behalf. He arrived back in Goa by early 1552 and planned to travel on to China.

On 17 April he set sail with Diogo Pereira on the Santa Cruz for China, planning to introduce himself as Apostolic Nuncio, and Pereira as the ambassador of the king of Portugal – but then realised that he had forgotten his testimonial letters as an Apostolic Nuncio. Back in Malacca, he was confronted by the captain Álvaro de Ataíde da Gama who refused to recognise his title of Nuncio, asked Pereira to resign from his title of ambassador, named a new crew for the ship, and demanded the gifts for the Chinese Emperor be left in Malacca.

In late August 1552, the Santa Cruz reached the Chinese island of Shangchuan, 14 km away from the southern coast of mainland China, near Taishan, Guangdong. He was accompanied only by a Jesuit student called Álvaro Ferreira, a Chinese man called António, and a Malabar servant called Christopher. Around mid-November, he sent a letter saying that a man had agreed to take him to the mainland in exchange for a large sum of money, and that he was waiting for the man. He had sent back Álvaro Ferreira and was staying in a small hut when he fell ill. He died, with only António as company, early in December 1552. His feast is celebrated on 3 December, but it is not clear that this is the day he actually died.

== Burials and relics ==
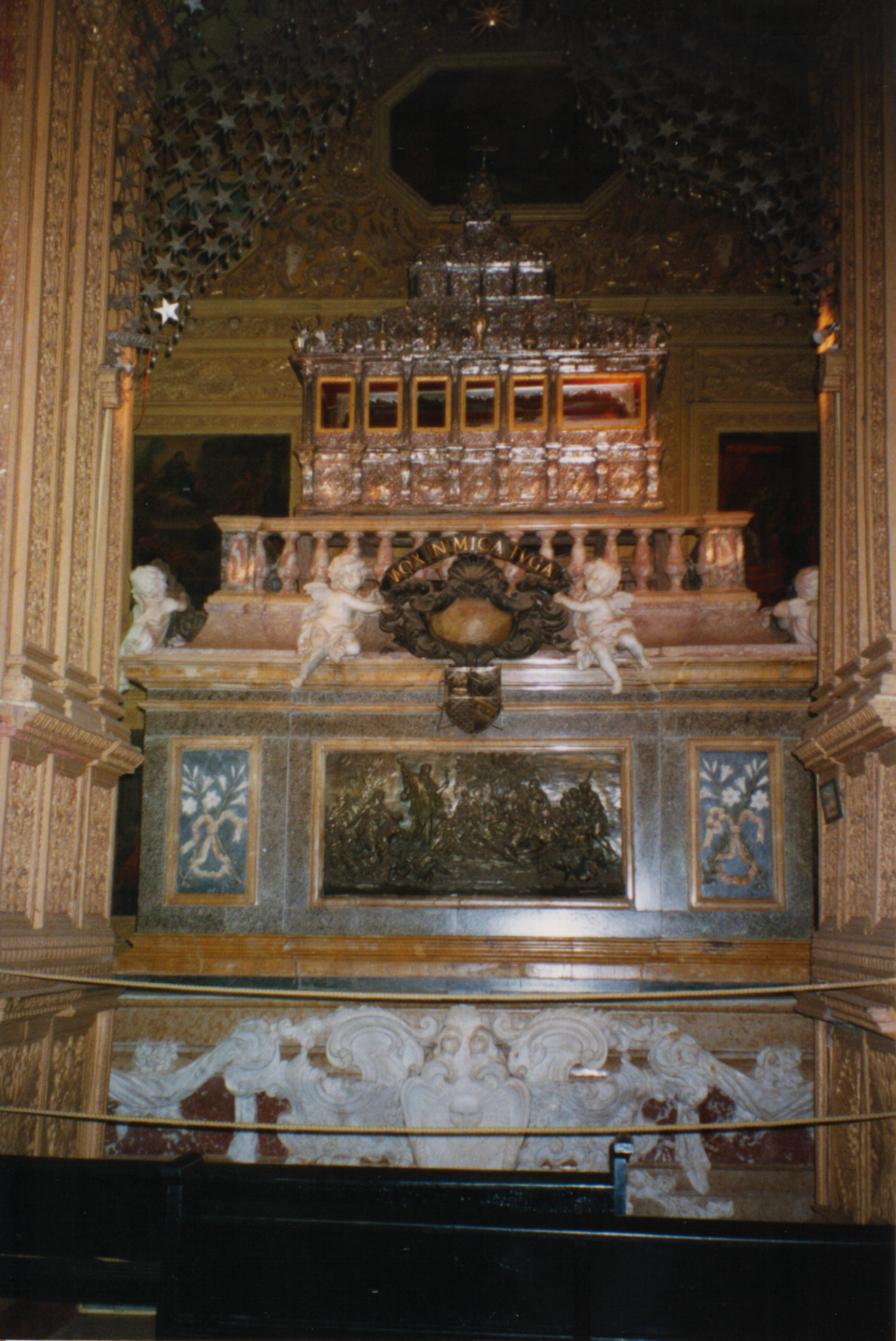
The casket of Saint Francis Xavier in the Basilica of Bom Jesus in Goa

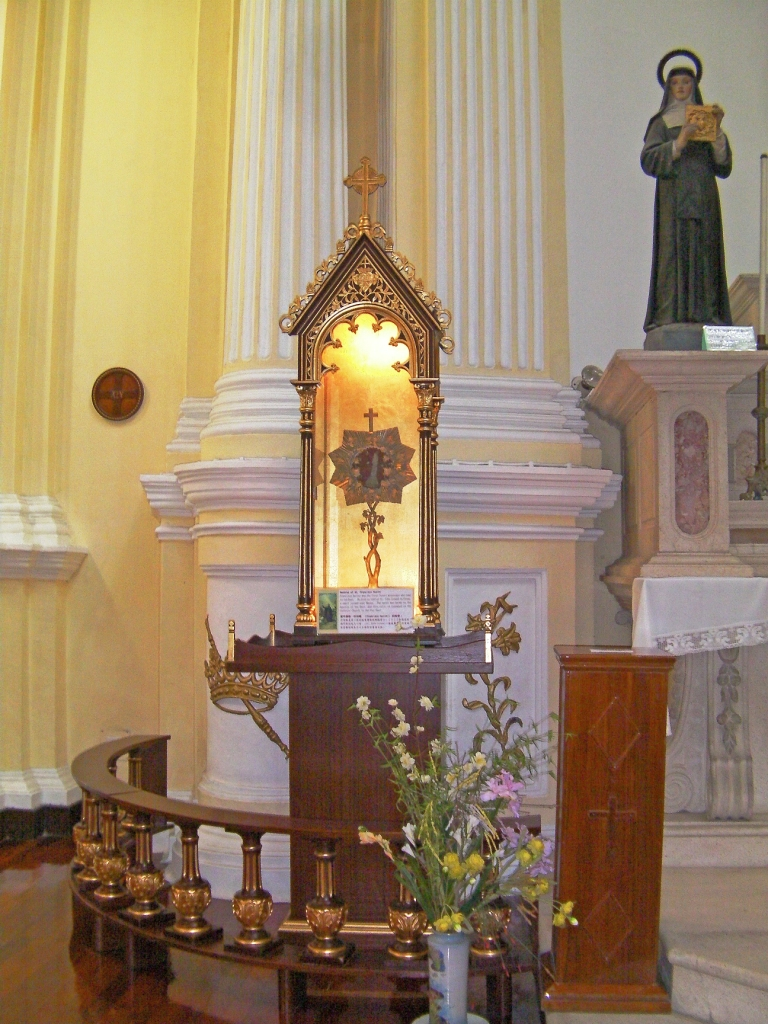
Saint Francis Xavier's upper arm bone at St. Joseph's Church, Macao

Xavier was first buried on a beach at Shangchuan Island. António got a shroud from some Portuguese merchants, and with another servant put his body in a wooden coffin. They added lime so that his bones could be taken back to India if requested. His body was buried until February 1553, when the Portuguese merchants dug it up. They noted that there was no smell at all, and that his body was whole. A slice was cut from the thigh for the captain, who smelled it and agreed to transport the body.

His body was taken to Our Lady of the Hill, a Jesuit church, in Portuguese Malacca on 22 March 1553. It was removed from the coffin and put in a shroud. The pit was small and workers tamped down the dirt on top of his body, causing lesions and breaking bones, and flattening the nose. There were no Jesuits present at the church during this process. An open grave in the church now marks the place of Xavier's burial.

The first time his body was inspected by non-laymen or servants was around 15 August 1553, when a group of Jesuits exhumed his body and found it incorrupt, emanating a sweet smell, "more like the garden of the bridegroom when the south wind blows than that of human flesh". The shroud was stained with blood, which was still wet. His body was then moved 4,000 km to Goa, where it arrived on 16 March 1554.

It was greeted by a crowd of some 6,000 people, including the Viceroy and other key colonial figures, and carried in procession to the Jesuit College of St Paul. For the following four days, people went to St Paul's in crowds to venerate it. Contemporary observers recorded "a great deal of shouting and disorder" and people shoving violently to have rosaries and other articles touch his body. Father Melchior Nunes Barreto opined in a letter to Igiatius Loyola the following May his belief that, if the priests had not been present, people would have even tried to obtain pieces of his body.

In 1559, his body was moved from St Paul's church, which was to be demolished, moved to the rector's room for a time and then to several other locations.

In subsequent decades, pieces of his corpse were removed and kept as relics. The right forearm, which Xavier used to bless and baptise his converts, was detached by request of Superior General Claudio Acquaviva in 1614. This was done in secret, his body being exhumed again for the lower portion of the arm to be surgically detached. It was sent to and has been displayed since in a silver reliquary at the main Jesuit church in Rome, Il Gesù.

The rest of the right arm was removed in 1619, the year that Francis was beatified, to be distributed to other Jesuit colleges in Cochi, Macau, and Malacca. Intestines and internal organs were removed in 1620 and distributed as relics more widely around the world.

The main body was enshrined in a silver reliquary in the Basilica of Bom Jesus in Goa in 1659. It had been placed there on 2 December 1637, and remains there now, in a glass container encased in a silver casket. This casket was constructed by Goan silversmiths between 1636 and 1637 and was a blend of Italian and Indian aesthetics. It included 32 silver plates on all four sides of the casket, depicting different episodes from the life of Xavier. Several of them depict Xavier's mission as having been planned by God, such as the one that depicts a recurrent dream that Xavier had of carrying a man on his shoulders. Another depicts the story of the healing of Antonio Rodrigues, a blind man who according to the story regained his sight when he placed the dead hand of Xavier's body over his eyes when it was lying at St Paul's. The casket was restored in 2021.

A relic from the right hand of St Francis Xavier is on display at St Mary's Cathedral, Sydney.

When the Jesuit provincial in Goa examined his body in 1686, he found that the face was deformed, the skin ravaged by moths, and the limbs shrunken. Jesuit concern at this prompted locks to be affixed to the removable silver panels on the reliquary. At one point the rector of the Basilica wrote to Rome, pleading that he be permitted to lose the keys by throwing them into the sea.

In the 1690s, Cosimo III de' Medici commissioned a marble pedestal for the reliquary to sit upon. It was carved in Florence by Giovanni Battista Foggini and shipped to India via Italy to be installed in 1698. The marble is polychromatic, and the pedestal has four large bronze relief sculptures that depict episodes from Xavier's life: preaching in the Indies, baptizing people, being persecuted by non-Christians, and dying on Shangchuan.

The bronze panels are on the second register of the pedestal, flanked by lilies and semi-precious stones. The third register, above it, is a balustrade made of pink marble, with two putti at each end, holding bronze banners above cartouche made of alabaster and bronze. The register below is made of pink and yellow marble and decorated with items made of white marble, including cherub heads, garlands, shields, and scroll volutes.

== Veneration ==
=== Beatification and canonisation ===
Francis Xavier was beatified by Pope Paul V on 25 October 1619, and was canonized by Pope Gregory XV on 12 March 1622, at the same time as Ignatius Loyola. (Note: For the most recent study of Francis Xavier's canonisation process, see Mormando, Franco (2006). "The Making of the Second Jesuit Saint: The Campaign for the Canonization of Francis Xavier, 1555–1622". In Mormando, F. (ed.). Francis Xavier and the Jesuit Missions in the Far East. Chestnut Hill, MA: The Jesuit Institute, Boston College. pp. 9–22.) Pope Pius XI proclaimed him the "Patron of Catholic Missions". His feast day is 3 December.

=== Pilgrimage centres ===
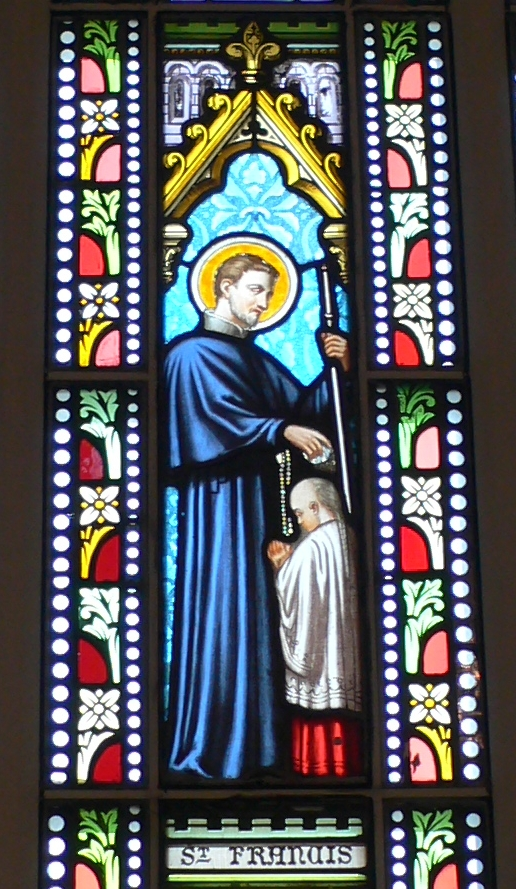
A stained glass church window in Béthanie, Hong Kong, of St Francis Xavier baptizing a Chinese man

==== Goa ====
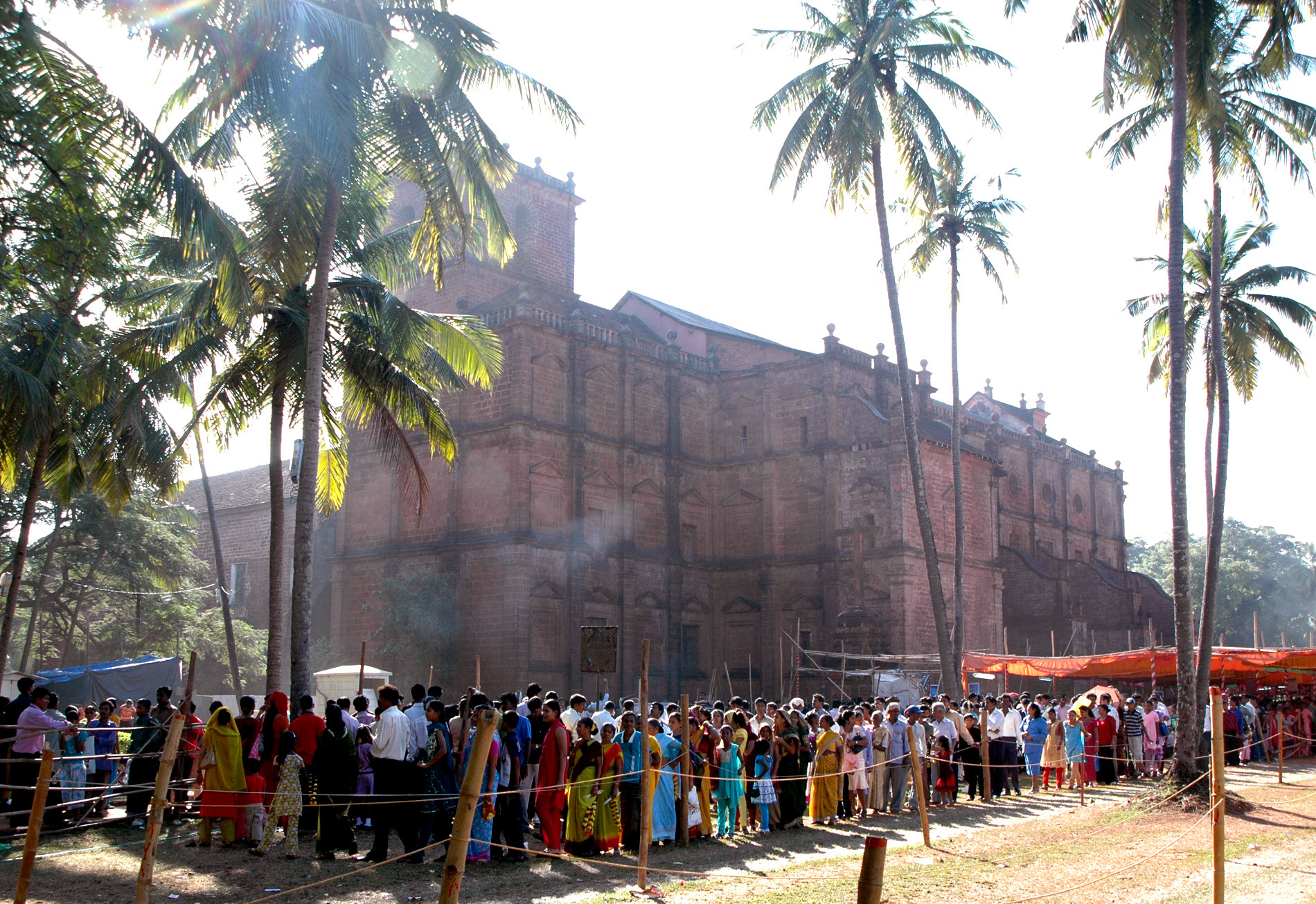
Goan Catholics celebrating the feast of Saint Francis Xavier at Bom Jesus Basilica

Saint Francis Xavier's mostly-incorruptible relics are kept in a silver casket, elevated inside the Bom Jesus Basilica and are exposed (being brought to ground level) generally every ten years, but this is discretionary. The sacred relics went on display starting on 22 November 2014 at the XVII Solemn Exposition. The display closed on 4 January 2015. The previous exposition, the sixteenth, was held from 21 November 2004 to 2 January 2005.

Relics of Saint Francis Xavier are also found in the Holy Spirit Church, Margao, in Sanv Fransiku Xavierachi Igorz (Church of St. Francis Xavier), Batpal, Canacona, Goa, and at St. Francis Xavier Chapel, Portais, Panjim.

==== Other places ====
Other pilgrimage centres include Xavier's birthplace in Navarre; the Church of the Gesù, Rome; Malacca (where he was buried for two years, before being brought to Goa); and Sancian (place of death).

Xavier is a major venerated saint in both Sonora and the neighbouring US state of Arizona. In Magdalena de Kino in Sonora, Mexico, in the Church of Santa María Magdalena, there is a reclining statue of San Francisco Xavier brought by pioneer Jesuit missionary Padre Eusebio Kino in the early 18th century. The statue is said to be miraculous and is the object of pilgrimage for many in the region. Also the Mission San Xavier del Bac is a pilgrimage site. The mission is an active parish church ministering to the people of the San Xavier District, Tohono O'odham Nation, and nearby Tucson, Arizona.

Francis Xavier is honoured in the Church of England and in the Episcopal Church on 3 December.

=== Novena of Grace ===
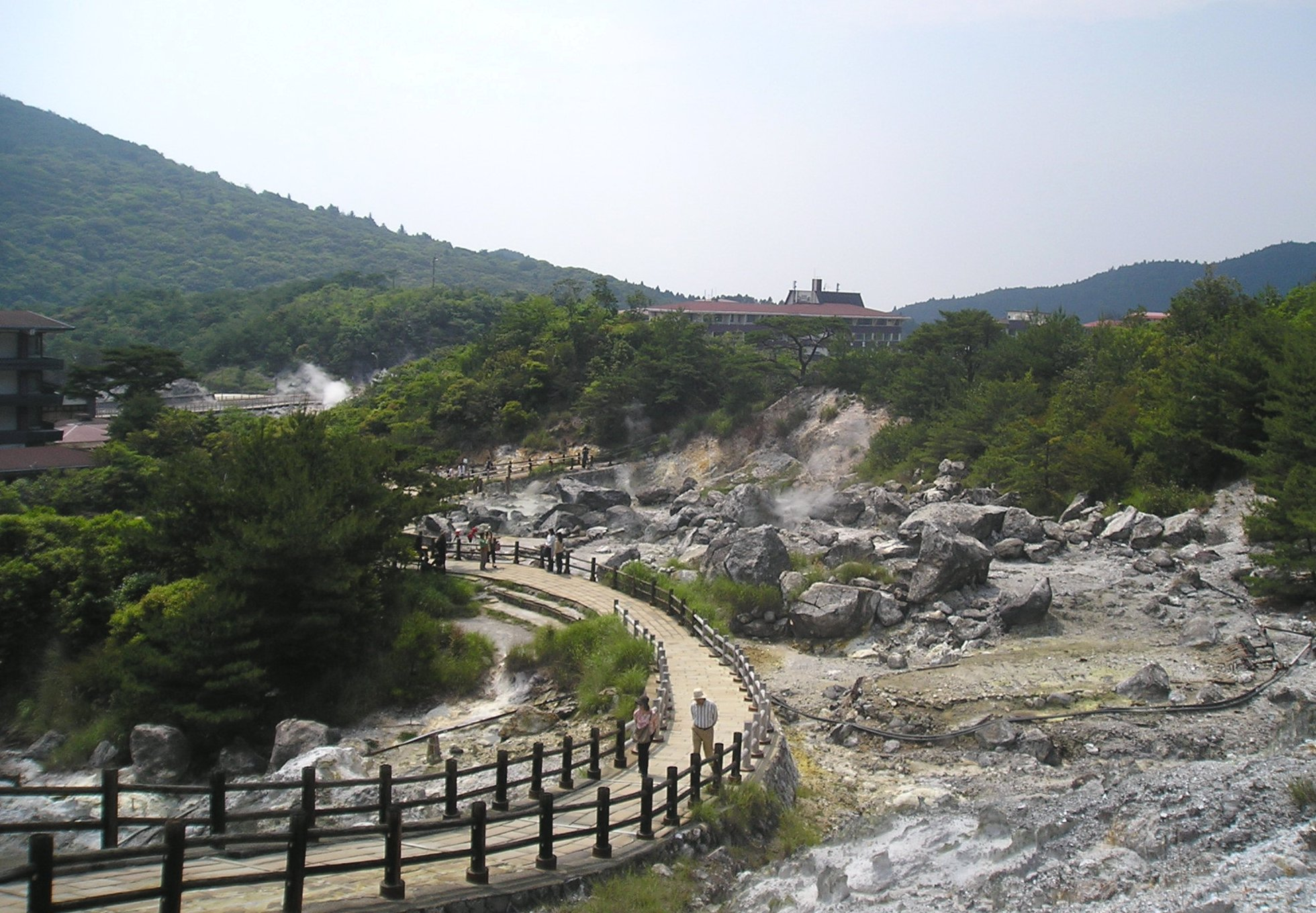
Fumaroles at Mt. Unzen, Japan

The Novena of Grace is a popular devotion to Francis Xavier, typically prayed either on the nine days before 3 December or on 4 March through 12 March (the anniversary of Pope Gregory XV's canonisation of Xavier in 1622). It began with the Italian Jesuit missionary Marcello Mastrilli. Before he could travel to the Far East, Mastrilli was gravely injured in a freak accident after a festive celebration dedicated to the Immaculate Conception in Naples. Delirious and on the verge of death, Mastrilli saw Xavier, who he later said asked him to choose between travelling or death by holding the respective symbols, to which Mastrilli answered, "I choose that which God wills".

Upon regaining his health, Mastrilli made his way via Goa and the Philippines to Satsuma, Japan. The Tokugawa shogunate beheaded the missionary in October 1637, after undergoing three days of tortures involving the volcanic sulphurous fumes from Mount Unzen, known as the Hell mouth or "pit" that had supposedly caused an earlier missionary to renounce his faith.

== Legacy ==
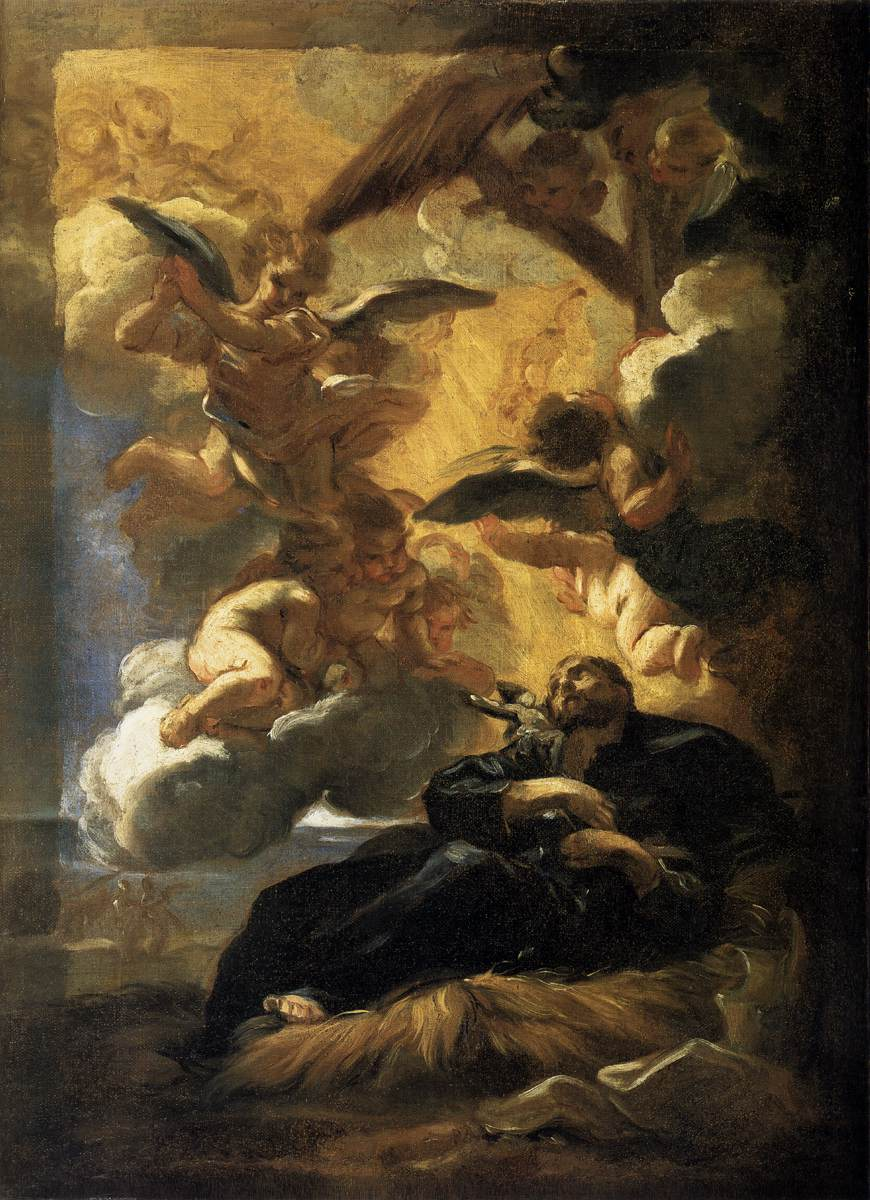
The Vision of St. Francis Xavier, by Giovanni Battista Gaulli

Francis Xavier became widely noteworthy for his missionary work, both as an organiser and as a pioneer; he converted more people than anyone else had done since Paul the Apostle. In 2006 Pope Benedict XVI said of both Ignatius of Loyola and Francis Xavier: "not only their history which was interwoven for many years from Paris and Rome, but a unique desire – a unique passion, it could be said – moved and sustained them through different human events: the passion to give to God-Trinity a glory always greater and to work for the proclamation of the Gospel of Christ to the peoples who had been ignored."

His personal efforts most affected religious practice in India and in the East Indies (Indonesia, Malaysia, Timor). As of 2021 India still has numerous Jesuit missions and many more schools. Xavier also worked to propagate Christianity in China and Japan. However, following the persecutions from 1587 onwards, instituted by Toyotomi Hideyoshi and the subsequent closing of Japan to foreigners from 1633 onwards, the Christians of Japan had to go underground to preserve an independent Christian culture. Likewise, while Xavier inspired many missionaries to China, Chinese Christians were forced underground there and developed their own Christian culture.

In 1869, a small chapel designed by Achille-Antoine Hermitte was completed over Xavier's death-place on Shangchuan Island, Canton. It was damaged and restored several times. The most recent restoration in 2006 marked the 500th anniversary of the saint's birth.

Francis Xavier is the patron saint of his native Navarre, which celebrates his feast day on 3 December as a government holiday. In addition to Roman Catholic Masses remembering Xavier on that day, now known as the Day of Navarre, celebrations in the surrounding weeks honour the region's cultural heritage. In the 1940s, devoted Catholics instituted the Javierada, an annual day-long pilgrimage, often on foot, from the capital at Pamplona to Xavier, where the Jesuits built a basilica and museum and restored Francis Xavier's family's castle.

=== Personal names ===
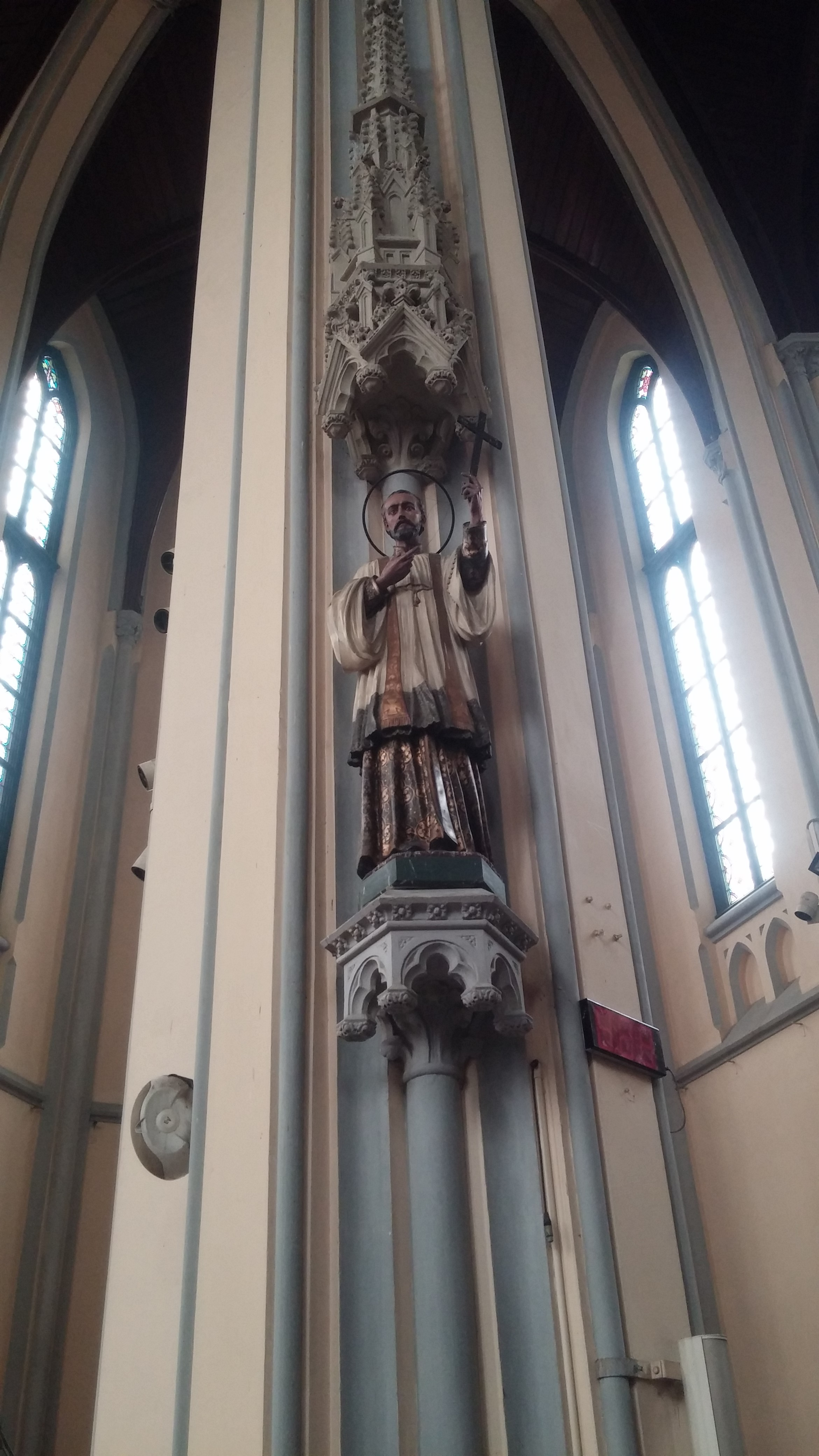
A statue of Santo Fransiskus Xaverius, at Jesuit Gereja Katedral Santa Perawan Maria Diangkat Ke Surga, in Jakarta, Indonesia

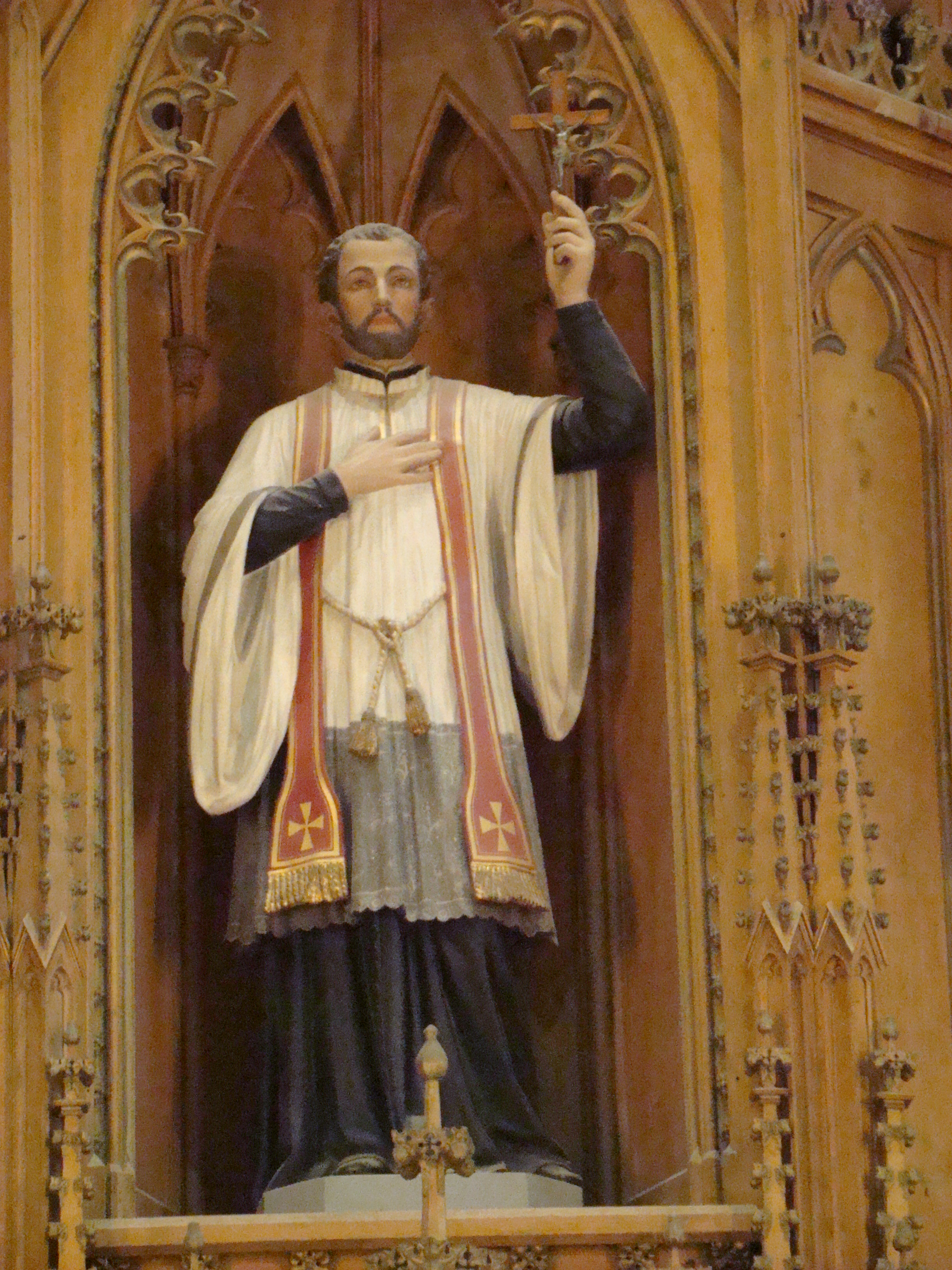
A statue of Saint Francis Xavier, at St. Francis Xavier Catholic Church, in Superior, Wisconsin, United States

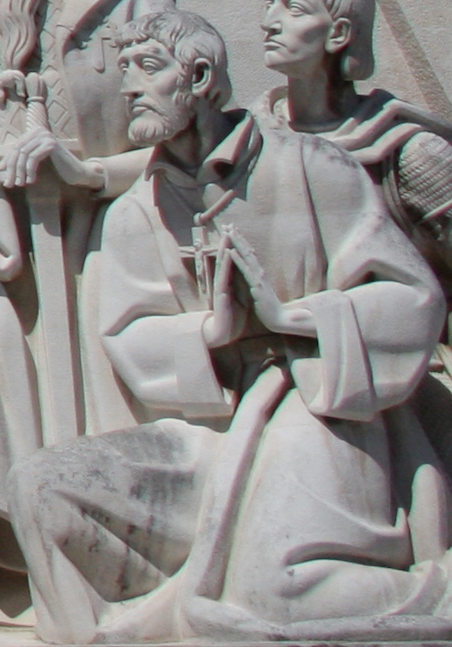
An effigy of Saint Francis Xavier in the Monument to the Discoveries in Lisbon, Portugal

As the foremost saint from Navarre and one of the main Jesuit saints, Francis Xavier is much venerated in Spain and the Hispanic countries where Francisco Javier or Javier are common male given names. The alternative spelling Xavier is also popular in the Basque Country, Portugal, Catalonia, Brazil, France, Belgium, and southern Italy. In India, the spelling Xavier is almost always used, and the name is quite common among Christians, especially in Goa and in the southern states of Tamil Nadu, Kerala, and Karnataka.

The names Francisco Xavier, António Xavier, João Xavier, Caetano Xavier, Domingos Xavier and so forth, were very common till quite recently in Goa. Fransiskus Xaverius is commonly used as a name for Indonesian Catholics, usually abbreviated as FX. In Austria and Bavaria the name is spelt as Xaver (pronounced [ˈksaːfɐ]) and often used in addition to Francis as Franz-Xaver ([frant͡sˈksaːfɐ]). In Polish the name becomes Ksawery.

Many Catalan men are named after him, often using the two-name combination Francesc Xavier. In English-speaking countries, "Xavier" until recently was likely to follow "Francis". In the 2000s, "Xavier" by itself became more popular than "Francis", and after 2001 featured as one of the hundred most common male baby names in the US. The Sevier family name, possibly most famous in the United States for John Sevier (1745–1815), originated from the name "Xavier".

=== Church dedications ===
Many churches all over the world, often founded by Jesuits, have been named in honour of Xavier. The many in the United States include the historic St. Francis Xavier Shrine at Warwick, Maryland (founded 1720), and the Basilica of St. Francis Xavier in Dyersville, Iowa. Note also the American educational teaching order, the Xaverian Brothers, and the Mission San Xavier del Bac in Tucson, Arizona (founded in 1692, and known for its Spanish Colonial architecture).

=== In art ===
- Rubens (1577–1640) painted Miracles of St.Francis Xavier for the Jesuit St. Charles Borromeo Church, Antwerp, in which he depicted one of St Francis's many miracles.
- The Charles Bridge in Prague, Czech Republic, features a statue of Francis Xavier.
- In front of Oita Station of Oita City, in Oita Prefecture (previously known as Bungo Province) in Japan, there stands a statue of Francis Xavier.
- The monument Padrão dos Descobrimentos in Belém (Lisbon), Portugal, features a Francis Xavier image.

=== Music ===
- Marc-Antoine Charpentier, In honorem Sancti Xaverij canticum H. 355, for soloists, chorus, flutes, strings and continuo (1688 ?)
- Marc-Antoine Charpentier, Canticum de Sto Xavierio H. 355a, for soloists, chorus, flutes, oboes, strings and continuo (1690).

=== Missions ===
Shortly before leaving for the East, Xavier issued a famous instruction to Father Gaspar Barazeuz who was leaving to go to Ormus (a Portuguese vassal kingdom on an island in the Persian Gulf, now part of Iran), that he should mix with sinners:

And if you wish to bring forth much fruit, both for yourselves and for your neighbours, and to live consoled, converse with sinners, making them unburden themselves to you. These are the living books by which you are to study, both for your preaching and for your own consolation. I do not say that you should not on occasion read written books... to support what you say against vices with authorities from the Holy Scriptures and examples from the lives of the saints.

— Kadič 1961, pp. 12–18

Modern scholars assess the number of people converted to Christianity by Francis Xavier at around 30,000. While some of Xavier's methods have subsequently come under criticism, he has also earned praise. He insisted that missionaries adapt to many of the customs, and most certainly to the language, of the culture they wish to evangelise. And unlike later missionaries, Xavier supported an educated native clergy. Though for a time it seemed that persecution had subsequently destroyed his work in Japan, Protestant missionaries three centuries later discovered that approximately 100,000 Christians still practised the faith in the Nagasaki area.

Francis Xavier's work initiated permanent change in eastern Indonesia, and he became known as the "Apostle of the Indies" – in 1546–1547 he worked in the Maluku Islands among the people of Ambon, Ternate, and Morotai (or Moro), and laid the foundations for a permanent mission. After he left the Maluku Islands, others carried on his work. By the 1560s there were 10,000 Roman Catholics in the area, mostly on Ambon. By the 1590s, there were 50,000 to 60,000.

=== Role in the Goa Inquisition ===
In 1546, Francis Xavier proposed the establishment of the Goa Inquisition in a letter addressed to the Portuguese King, John III. Xavier addresses the King as the 'Vicar of Christ', owing to his royal patronage over Christianity in the East Indies. In a letter dated 20 January 1548, he requests the king to be tough on the Portuguese governor in India so that he may be active in propagating the faith. Xavier also wrote to the Portuguese king asking for protection in regards to new converts who were being harassed by Portuguese commandants. Francis Xavier died in 1552 without ever living to see the start of the Goa Inquisition.

=== Educational institutions ===
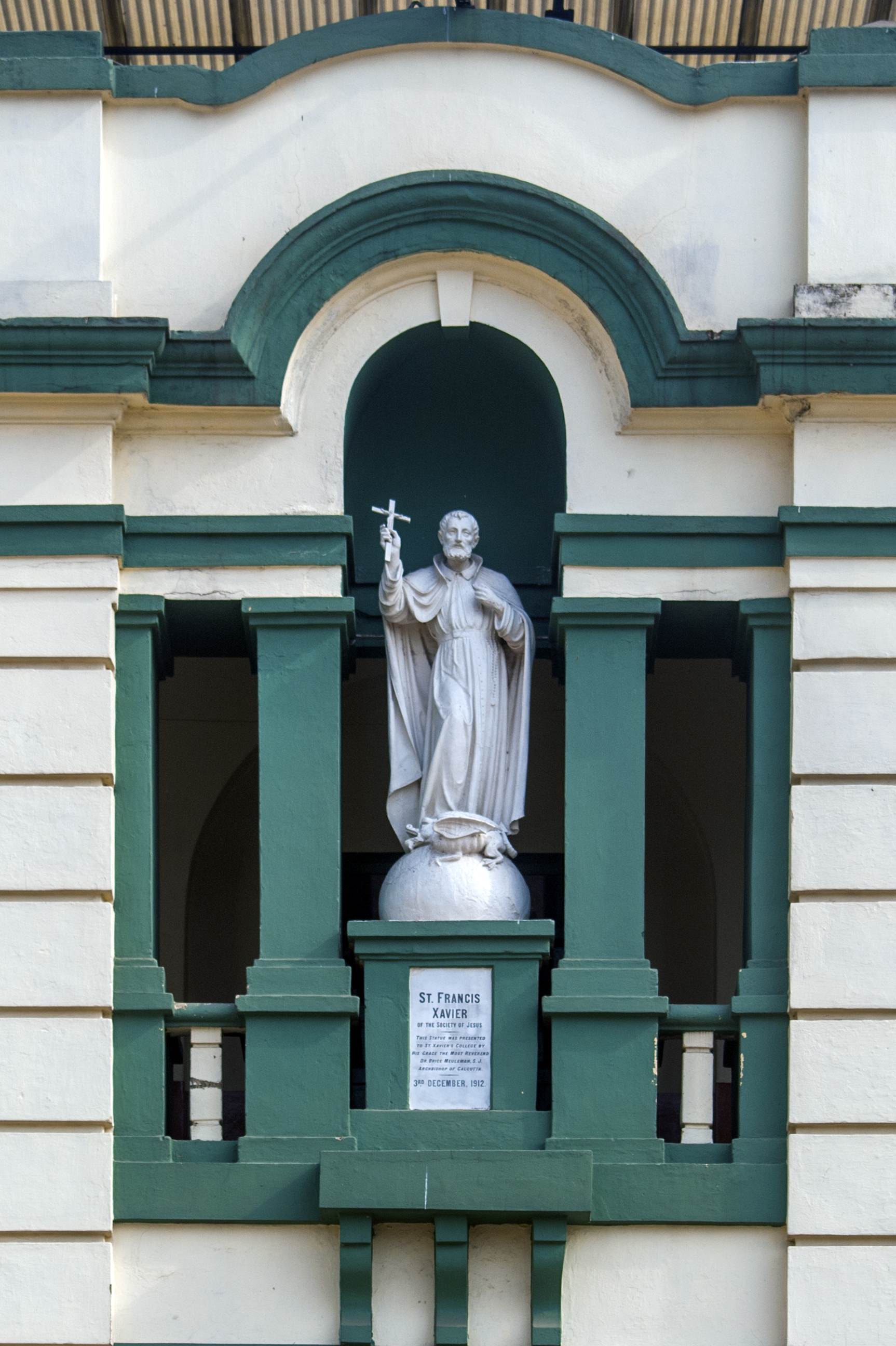
A statue of St. Francis Xavier at St. Xavier's Collegiate School, Kolkata

A number of educational institutions are named after him, including:

- Xavier University – Cincinnati, Ohio
- St. Xavier High School — Cincinnati, Ohio
- St. Xavier High School — Louisville, Kentucky
- St. Xavier's High School, Fort
- St. Xavier's College, Mumbai
- St. Xavier's High School, Vile Parle, Mumbai
- St. Xavier's School, Kolhapur, Kolhapur, MH, India
- St Francis Xavier's Green Herald International School, Dhaka, Bangladesh
- Xaverian College, Manchester, England
- Xavierian Pontifical University, Bogotá, Colombia
- Xavier High School (New York City)
- Xavier High School (Middletown, Connecticut)
- Xavier School — San Juan City, Philippines
- Xavier University – Ateneo de Cagayan, Cagayan de Oro City, Philippines
- Saint Francis Xavier College, Clapham
- St. Francis Xavier University – Antigonish, Nova Scotia
- St. Francis Xavier Catholic Secondary School – Milton, Ontario
- St. Francis Xavier High School – Edmonton, Alberta, Canada
- St. Francis Xavier Catholic Secondary School – Mississauga, Ontario, Canada
- St. Xavier's Institution – Georgetown, Penang, Malaysia
- St. Francis' Institution – Malacca, Malaysia
- Xavier College – Melbourne, Victoria, Australia
- Xavier Catholic College, Llandilo – Penrith, New South Wales, Australia
- St. Francis Xavier's College, Hong Kong
- St. Xavier's College, Kolkata
- St. Xavier's School, Kolkata
- St. Francis Xavier's College, Liverpool
- St. Xavier's College, Maitighar
- St. Xavier's School, Jawalakhel
- St. Xavier's School, Godavari
- Xavier University, New Orleans, Louisiana

== See also ==
- Catholicism in China
- Catholicism in Japan
- Catholicism in India
- Catholicism in Indonesia
- Christianity in China
- Christianity in Japan
- Christianity in India
- Christianity in Indonesia
- Goa Inquisition
- History of Roman Catholicism in Japan
- Jesuit China missions
- List of Westerners who visited Japan before 1868
- Mission San Xavier del Bac — San Xavier District, Tohono O'odham Nation, Arizona
- Xaverian Brothers — religious order in America
- Saint Francis Xavier, patron saint archive
