= Bertizarana =

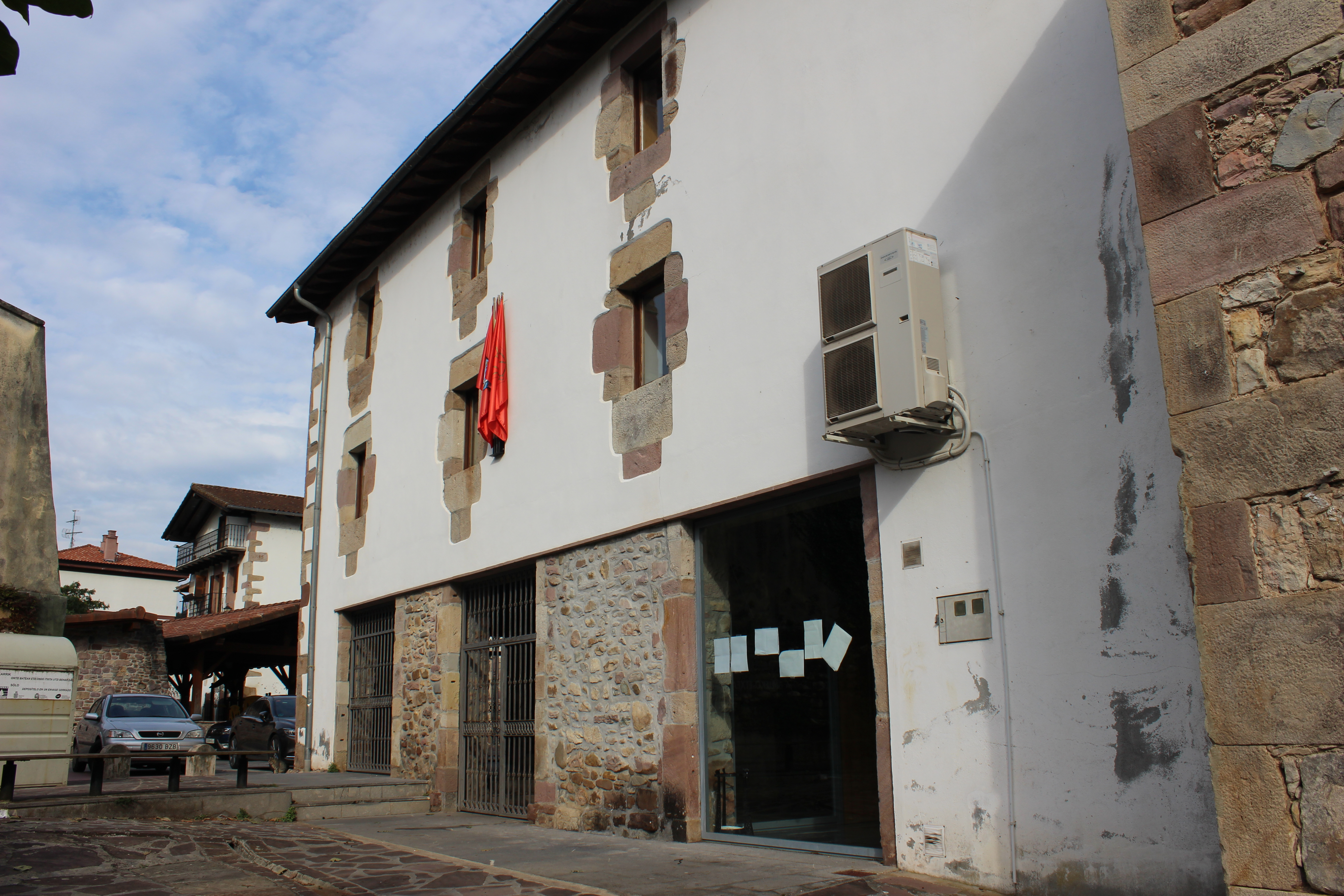
- Town hall

- Coat of arms

- Location of Bertizarana within Navarre Location of Bertizarana within Spain
- Coordinates: 43.1758°N 1.62778°W
- Country: Spain
- Autonomous community: Navarra

Area
  - Total: 39.56 km^{2} (15.27 sq mi)
- Elevation: 136 m (446 ft)

Population (2025-01-01)
  - Total: 668
  - Density: 16.9/km^{2} (43.7/sq mi)
- Time zone: UTC+1 (CET)
  - Summer (DST): UTC+2 (CEST)

Bertizarana is a town and municipality located in the province and autonomous community of Navarre, northern Spain.
