= Rupandehi 5 =

Parliamentary constituency in Lumbini Province, Nepal

- Parliamentary constituency
- Rupanedhi 5 in Lumbini Province
- Province: Lumbini Province
- District: Rupandehi District

Current constituency
- Created: 1991
- Party: Rastriya Swatantra Party
- Member of Parliament: Taufique Ahmad Khan

Rupandehi 5 one of three parliamentary constituencies of Rupandehi District in Nepal. This constituency came into existence on the Constituency Delimitation Commission (CDC) report submitted on 31 August 2017.

== Incorporated areas ==
Rupandehi 5 incorporates Kanchan Rural Municipality, Gaidhawa Rural Municipality, wards 5–11 of Sainamaina Municipality, wards 6–9 of Sudhdhodhan Rural Municipality, ward 1 of Mayadevi Rural Municipality and wards 1 and 3–11 of Lumbini Sanskritik Municipality.

== Assembly segments ==
It encompasses the following Lumbini Provincial Assembly segment

- Rupandehi 5(A)
- Rupandehi 5(B)

== Members of Parliament ==
=== Parliament/Constituent Assembly ===
| Election | Member | Party |
|---|---|---|
| 1991 | Shyam Sundar Gupta | Nepal Sadbhawana Party |
| 1994 | Sarvendra Nath Shukla | Rastriya Prajatantra Party |
| 1999 | Yaggya Jeet Shah | Nepal Sadbhawana Party |
| 2008 | Ram Nath Dhakal | CPN (Unified Marxist–Leninist) |
| 2013 | Bharat Kumar Shah | Nepali Congress |
| 2022 | Basudev Ghimire | CPN (Unified Marxist–Leninist) |
| 2026 | Taufique Ahmad Khan | Rastriya Swatantra Party |

=== Provincial Assembly ===
==== 5(A) ====
| Election | Member | Party |
|---|---|---|
| 2017 | Bhumeshwar Dhakal | CPN (Unified Marxist–Leninist) |
| May 2018 | Bhumeshwar Dhakal | Nepal Communist Party |

==== 5(B) ====
| Election | Member | Party |
|---|---|---|
| 2017 | Fakharuddin Khan | Nepali Congress |

== Election results ==
=== Election in the 2020s ===
==== 2026 general election ====
| Candidate | Party | Votes | % |
|---|---|---|---|
| Taufique Ahmad Khan | Rastriya Swatantra Party | 38,806 | 49.23 |
| Khim Lal Bhattarai | CPN (UML) | 13,100 | 16.62 |
| Bharat Kumar Shah | Nepali Congress | 12,624 | 16.02 |
| Muhammad Wakil Musalman | Nepali Communist Party | 6,176 | 7.84 |
| Others | | 8,119 | 10.30 |
| Total | | 78,825 | 100.00 |
| Valid votes | | 78,825 | 93.20 |
| Invalid/blank votes | | 5,747 | 6.80 |
| Total votes | | 84,572 | 100.00 |
| Registered voters/turnout | | 134,442 | 62.91 |
| Majority | | 25,706 | |
| Rastriya Swatantra Party gain | | | |

==== 2022 general election ====
| Candidate | Party | Votes | % |
|---|---|---|---|
| Basudev Ghimire | CPN (UML) | 36,822 | 45.74 |
| Bharat Kumar Shah | Nepali Congress | 27,120 | 33.69 |
| Chandrashekhar Sonar | Janamat Party | 8,390 | 10.42 |
| Bhishma Kumar Rana | Hamro Nepali Party | 5,876 | 7.30 |
| Others | | 2,296 | 2.85 |
| Total | | 80,504 | 100.00 |
| Majority | | 9,702 | |
| CPN (UML) gain | | | |

=== Election in the 2010s ===
==== 2017 legislative elections ====
| Party | Candidate | Votes |
|---|---|---|
| Nepali Congress | Bharat Kumar Shah | 33,088 |
| CPN (Maoist Centre) | Dila Ram Acharya | 20,438 |
| Federal Socialist Forum, Nepal | Mohammad Wakil Musalman | 14,121 |
| CPN (Marxist–Leninist) | Krishna Upadhyaya | 1,879 |
| Rastriya Janamukti Party | Bhaira Bahadur Thapa Magar | 1,657 |
| Rastriya Janata Party Nepal | Rajendra Gupta | 1,337 |
| Others | | 1,739 |
| Invalid votes | | 5,237 |
| Result | Congress hold | |
Source: Election Commission

==== 2017 Nepalese provincial elections ====
===== 5(A) =====
| Party | Candidate | Votes |
|---|---|---|
| CPN (Unified Marxist–Leninist) | Bhumeshwar Dhakal | 22,025 |
| Nepali Congress | Bishnu Prasad Pokharel | 15,416 |
| Federal Socialist Forum, Nepal | Sushila Tharu | 3,804 |
| Rastriya Janamukti Party | Durga Rajakoti | 1,604 |
| Others | | 1,305 |
| Invalid votes | | 1,761 |
| Result | CPN (UML) gain | |
Source: Election Commission

===== 5(B) =====
| Party | Candidate | Votes |
|---|---|---|
| Nepali Congress | Fakharuddin Khan | 16,683 |
| Federal Socialist Forum, Nepal | Ramauti Yadav | 9,250 |
| CPN (Unified Marxist–Leninist) | Hajrat Bilal Fakir | 1,673 |
| Rastriya Janata Party Nepal | Aliullah Muslaman | 1,386 |
| Others | | 2,108 |
| Invalid votes | | 2,508 |
| Result | Congress gain | |
Source: Election Commission

==== 2013 Constituent Assembly election ====
| Party | Candidate | Votes |
|---|---|---|
| Nepali Congress | Bharat Kumar Shah | 14,274 |
| CPN (Unified Marxist–Leninist) | Ram Nath Dhakal | 13,766 |
| UCPN (Maoist) | Dadhiram Neupane | 4,622 |
| Rastriya Janamukti Party | Bam Bahadur Darlami Magar | 2,393 |
| Madheshi Janaadhikar Forum, Nepal (Democratic) | Mohan Lal Yadav | 2,271 |
| Others | | 3,382 |
| Result | Congress gain | |
Source: NepalNews

=== Election in the 2000s ===
==== 2008 Constituent Assembly election ====
| Party | Candidate | Votes |
|---|---|---|
| CPN (Unified Marxist–Leninist) | Ram Nath Dhakal | 11,080 |
| CPN (Maoist) | Basanta Kumar Shrestha | 10,785 |
| Nepali Congress | Bharat Kumar Shah | 8,920 |
| Madheshi Janaadhikar Forum, Nepal | Mohan Lal Yadav | 4,443 |
| Nepal Sadbhavana Party (Anandidevi) | Rangi Lal Lodh | 2,610 |
| Rastriya Janamukti Party | Bhaira Bahadur Thapa | 2,571 |
| Sadbhawana Party | Gajendra Gupta | 1,356 |
| Others | | 2,885 |
| Invalid votes | | 2,144 |
| Result | CPN (UML) gain | |
Source: Election Commission

=== Election in the 1990s ===
==== 1999 legislative elections ====
| Party | Candidate | Votes |
|---|---|---|
| Nepal Sadbhawana Party | Yaggya Jeet Shah | 19,203 |
| Rastriya Prajatantra Party | Sarvendra Nath Shukla | 14,476 |
| Nepali Congress | Vashistha Mani Tripathi | 9,016 |
| Others | | 1,598 |
| Invalid votes | | 1,151 |
| Result | NSP gain | |
Source: Election Commission

==== 1994 legislative elections ====
| Party | Candidate | Votes |
|---|---|---|
| Rastriya Prajatantra Party | Sarvendra Nath Shukla | 13,919 |
| Independent | Yaggya Jeet Shah | 11,712 |
| Nepal Sadbhawana Party | Shyam Sundar Gupta | 6,694 |
| Nepali Congress | Shaligram Upadhyaya | 3,699 |
| Others | | 1,752 |
| Result | RPP gain | |
Source: Election Commission

==== 1991 legislative elections ====
| Party | Candidate | Votes |
|---|---|---|
| Nepal Sadbhawana Party | Shyam Sundar Gupta | 12,282 |
| Nepali Congress | Yaggya Jeet Shah | 7,957 |
| Result | NSP gain | |

== See also ==
- List of parliamentary constituencies of Nepal
