= Rupandehi 4 =

Parliamentary constituency in Lumbini Province, Nepal

- Parliamentary constituency for the House of Representatives
- Rupandehi 4 in Lumbini Province
- Province: Lumbini Province
- District: Rupandehi District

Current constituency
- Created: 1991
- Party: Rastriya Swatantra Party
- Member of Parliament: Kanhaiya Baniya

Rupandehi 4 one of three parliamentary constituencies of Rupandehi District in Nepal. This constituency came into existence on the Constituency Delimitation Commission (CDC) report submitted on 31 August 2022.

== Incorporated areas ==
Rupandehi 4 incorporates Sammarimai Rural Municipality, Marchawari Rural Municipality, Kothimai Rural Municipality, wards 2–6 of Mayadevi Rural Municipality, wards 4 and 5 of Siyari Rural Municipality and wards 2, 12 and 13 of Lumbini Sanskritik Municipality.

== Assembly segments ==
It encompasses the following Lumbini Provincial Assembly segment

- Rupandehi 4(A)
- Rupandehi 4(B)

== Members of Parliament ==
=== Parliament/Constituent Assembly ===
Election	Member	Party
1991	Sant Prasad Chaudhary	Nepal Sadbhawana Party
1994	Jyotendra Mohan Chaudhary	Independent
1995	Jyotendra Mohan Chaudhary	Rastriya Prajatantra Party
January 1998	Jyotendra Mohan Chaudhary	Rastriya Prajatantra Party (Chand)
1999	Bharat Kumar Shah	Nepali Congress
2008	Bishnu Prasad Paudel	CPN (Unified Marxist–Leninist)
2017	Pramod Kumar Yadav	Nepali Congress
2022	Sarbendra Nath Shukla	Loktantrik Samajwadi Party, Nepal
2026	Kanhaiya Baniya	Rastriya Swatantra Party

=== Provincial Assembly ===
==== 4(A) ====
Election	Member	Party
2017	Ashta Bhuja Pathak	Nepali Congress

==== 4(B) ====
Election	Member	Party
2017	Basiuddin Khan	Nepali Congress

== Election results ==
=== Election in the 2020s ===
==== 2022 general election ====
Candidate	Party	Votes	%
Sarbendra Nath Shukla	Loktantrik Samajwadi Party, Nepal	28,000	39.44
Pramod Kumar Yadav	Nepali Congress	22,704	31.98
Bhopendra Prasad Yadav	Janamat Party	15,526	21.87
Om Prakash Yadav	People's Socialist Party, Nepal	2,623	3.69
Mahendra Nath Singh Rae	Nepal Janata Party	1,086	1.53
Others		1,063	1.50
Total		71,002	100.00
Majority		5,296	
Loktantrik Samajwadi Party, Nepal gain			

=== Election in the 2010s ===
==== 2017 legislative elections ====
Party	Candidate	Votes
Nepali Congress	Pramod Kumar Yadav	31,718
Rastriya Janata Party Nepal	Sarbendra Nath Shukla	20,416
CPN (Unified Marxist–Leninist)	Om Prakash Yadav	4,079
Federal Socialist Forum, Nepal	Om Prakash Yadav	2,306
Others		2,491
Invalid votes		6,759
Result	Congress gain	
Source: Election Commission

==== 2017 Nepalese provincial elections ====
===== 4(A) =====
Party	Candidate	Votes
Nepali Congress	Ashta Bhuja Pathak	9,064
Rastriya Janata Party Nepal	Hajrat Ali	4,634
Federal Socialist Forum, Nepal	Kanhaiya Baniya	4,521
CPN (Unified Marxist–Leninist)	Pallavi Shukla	2,339
Independent	Dilip Kumar Singh Lodh	2,112
Nepal Yuva Kisan Party	Kamala Pati Yadav	1,503
Independent	Sahauddin Devan	1,402
Nepal Janata Party	Biresh Barai	1,271
Others		1,478
Invalid votes		3,539
Result	Congress gain	
Source: Election Commission

===== 4(B) =====
Party	Candidate	Votes
Nepali Congress	Basiuddin Khan	12,113
Independent	Birendra Kalvar	5,769
Independent	Bal Krishna Tripathi	3,499
Rastriya Janata Party Nepal	Shrinivas Yadav	3,120
CPN (Unified Marxist–Leninist)	Sant Kumar Yadav	2,661
Independent	Om Prakash Lodh	2,606
Federal Socialist Forum, Nepal	Ramu Ahir	1,122
Others		1,418
Invalid votes		3,556
Result	Congress gain	
Source: Election Commission

==== 2013 Constituent Assembly election ====
Party	Candidate	Votes
CPN (Unified Marxist–Leninist)	Bishnu Prasad Paudel	19,577
Nepali Congress	Surya Prasad Pradhan	13,632
UCPN (Maoist)	Dr. Baburam Bhattarai	11,934
Rastriya Janamukti Party	Bhim Bahadur Rana	2,290
Others		2,882
Result	CPN (UML) hold	
Source: NepalNews

=== Election in the 2000s ===
==== 2008 Constituent Assembly election ====
Party	Candidate	Votes
CPN (Unified Marxist–Leninist)	Bishnu Prasad Paudel	15,880
CPN (Maoist)	Bhakti Prasad Pandey	13,421
Nepali Congress	Surya Prasad Pradhan	13,182
Rastriya Janamukti Party	Kamala Thapa	2,012
CPN (Marxist–Leninist)	Tika Nidhi Gautam	1,335
Others		1,828
Invalid votes		1,442
Result	CPN (UML) gain	
Source: Election Commission

=== Election in the 1990s ===
==== 1999 legislative elections ====
Party	Candidate	Votes
Nepali Congress	Bharat Kumar Shah	15,030
Nepal Sadbhawana Party	Mohammad Ajim Miya	14,539
CPN (Unified Marxist–Leninist)	Ramnath Sharma Dhakal	12,958
Rastriya Prajatantra Party (Chand)	Deepak Bohara	9,962
Rastriya Prajatantra Party	Jyotendra Mohan Chaudhary	6,963
Rastriya Janamukti Party	Jasmaya Gurung	1,204
Others		1,433
Invalid votes		1,727
Result	Congress gain	
Source: Election Commission

==== 1994 legislative elections ====
Party	Candidate	Votes
Independent	Jyotendra Mohan Chaudhary	11,559
Nepal Sadbhawana Party	Mohammad Ajim Miya	11,015
Nepali Congress	Laxmi Upadhyaya	10,822
CPN (Unified Marxist–Leninist)	Bhim Narayan Tharu	10,087
Others		8,557
Result	Independent gain	
Source: Election Commission

==== 1991 legislative elections ====
Party	Candidate	Votes
Nepal Sadbhawana Party	Sant Prasad Chaudhary	9,866
Nepali Congress		9,829
Result	NSP gain	

== See also ==
- List of parliamentary constituencies of Nepal
