= Taufique Ahmad Khan =

Nepalese politician

Honourable Taufique Ahmad Khan
- तौफिक अहमद खान

Member of Parliament, Pratinidhi Sabha
- Incumbent
- Assumed office 26 March 2026
- Preceded by: Basudev Ghimire
- Constituency: Rupandehi 5

Personal details
- Born: 1 October 1987 (age 39) Siddharthanagar, Rupandehi, Nepal
- Citizenship: Nepalese
- Party: Rastriya Swatantra Party (2026 – present)
- Parent: Safique Ahmad (father)
- Education: Pondicherry University (MBA); Delhi University (B. Com)
- Profession: Politician

Taufique Ahmad Khan (Nepali: तौफिक अहमद खान), also spelled as Taufiq Ahmed Khan or Taufiq Ahmad Khan and also known as TK, is a Nepalese politician of Rastriya Swatantra Party, currently serving as a member of parliament. He was elected to the Pratinidhi Sabha, the lower house of the Federal Parliament of Nepal from the Rupandehi 5 parliamentary constituency in the 2026 Nepalese General Election. He secured 38,806 votes and defeated Khim Lal Bhattarai of the CPN (UML).

== Personal life and career ==
Khan was born in Bhairahawa, Siddharthanagar of Rupandehi district, on October 1, 1987. He was born to Safique Ahmad. He completed his Bachelor of Commerce at Delhi University and Master of Business Administration at Pondicherry University, India. After finishing his higher education, he returned to Nepal and served as a strategic advisor for Lumbini Sanskritik and the Siddharthanagar Municipality in Rupandehi district. In this role, he developed and implemented plans for waste management, green infrastructure, and carbon reduction policies. Khan represented Nepal at COP28 in the United Arab Emirates in 2023, advocating for equitable climate action. He showcased community-based carbon-reduction and clean-energy solutions designed specifically for developing communities.

== Politics ==
He began his political journey by joining the Rastriya Swatantra Party in 2025. His popularity among youth and experience in the social sector helped him to secure a party ticket to contest the 2026 Nepalese general election from the Rupandehi 5 constituency. In the election, he won by a margin of 25,706 votes and defeated former MP, constituent assembly member, and veteran leader Bharat Kumar Shah of the Nepali Congress and Khim Lal Bhattarai, former Rastriya Sabha member of the CPN (UML).

== Electoral performance ==
Election	Year	Constituency	Contested for	Political party	Result	Votes	% of votes	Ref.
Nepal general election	2026	Rupandehi 5	Pratinidhi Sabha member	Rastriya Swatantra Party	Won	38,806	49.23%	
