= Madhabaliya =

Coordinates: 27°34′N 83°30′E

Madhawaliya माधवलिया
- Interactive map of Madhawaliya
- Country: Nepal
- Province: Lumbini Province
- District: Rupandehi District

Population (1991)
  - Total: 8,380
- Time zone: UTC+5:45 (Nepal Time)

Madhabaliya is a town in Tilottama Municipality in Rupandehi District in Lumbini Province of southern Nepal. The formerly village development committee was merged to form a new municipality on 18 May 2014. At the time of the 1991 Nepal census it had a population of 8,380 people living in 528 individual households.
