= Pharsatikar =

Pharsatikar फर्साटिकर
- Village development committee
- Country: Nepal
- Province: Lumbini Province
- District: Rupandehi District

Population (1991)
  - Total: 5,739
- Time zone: UTC+5:45 (Nepal Time)

Pharsatikar (named Suddodhan in 2018) is a Rural municipality in Rupandehi District, Lumbini Province of southern Nepal. At the time of the 2011 Nepal census it had a population of 9,663 people living in 1992 individual households. Before some years, people here used to be mostly Tharus but due to, the huge agricultural possibility and a very good environment that it serves to the people staying here, its population has found to be increased with mostly people shifted here from Myanmar in late 80's along with Paharis migrating from the neighbouring districts.

== Education ==
Pharsatikar is an educational hub of nearby areas. Educational quality is gradually increasing in recent years. Some education institutions are

- Tillottama English Secondary School
- Dream Vision School
- Little Flower English Boarding School
- Siddhartha English Secondary School
- Pharsatikar Secondary School

== Transport ==
Bicycles and Motorbikes are the common means of transport in Pharsatikar. E-Ricksaw are available for short-distance travel while Buses and vans are available for Butwal in every 20 minutes. One Bus departs for Kathmandu via Pharsatikar in daily basis.

== Economy ==
Main market remains closed every Friday. There are two fairs held every week, one on Tuesday and other on Saturday. Banks available for banking services are :
*NIC ASIA
*Nepal Community Bank
*Shine Resunga Development Bank
*NMB bank Limited
*Agricultural development bank
*Garima Development Bank
*Siddhartha Bank

== Places of Interest ==
- Siyabar - Durga mandir
- Lumbini
- Murgiya
- Darbaha
- Naryanapur
- Tinau River
- Bethani- A beautiful and clean village
- Parroha Parmeshower Bolbam Dham
- Suddodhan park
