= Makrahar =

Makrahar मक्रहर
- Location in Nepal
- Coordinates: 27.62°N 83.53°E
- Country: Nepal
- Province: Lumbini Province
- District: Rupandehi District

Population (1991)
  - Total: 4,267
- Time zone: UTC+5:45 (Nepal Time)

Makrahar is a town in Tilottama Municipality in Rupandehi District in Lumbini Province of southern Nepal. The formerly village development committee was merged to form new municipality on 18 May 2014. At the time of the 1991 Nepal census it had a population of 9929 people living in 1765 individual households. Shree Shivapur Higher Secondary School is located in Makrahar.
