= Kamahariya =

Kamahariya कमहरिया मायादेवी गाउँपालिका
- Village development committee
- Location in Nepal
- Coordinates: 27.53°N 83.36°E
- Country: Nepal
- Province: Lumbini Province
- District: Rupandehi District

Government

Population (1991)
  - Total: 5,641
- Time zone: UTC+5:45 (Nepal Time)

Kamahariya is a village development committee in Rupandehi District in Lumbini Province of southern Nepal.

== Demographics ==
At the time of the 1991 Nepal census it had a population of 5641 people living in 912 individual households.
