= Hati Pharsatika =

Coordinates: 27°32′N 83°31′E

Hati Pharsatika हाती फर्साटिका
- Village development committee
- Interactive map of Hati Pharsatika
- Country: Nepal
- Province: Lumbini Province
- District: Rupandehi District

Population (1991)
  - Total: 4,269
- Time zone: UTC+5:45 (Nepal Time)

Hati Pharsatika is a village development committee in Rupandehi District in Lumbini Province of southern Nepal. At the time of the 1991 Nepal census it had a population of 4269.
