= Dhakadhai =

Dhakdhai Nepal Dhakdhai Nepal
- Village Dhakdhai
- Location in Nepal
- Coordinates: 27.51°N 83.55°E
- Country: Nepal
- Province: Lumbini Province
- District: Rupandehi District

Population (1991)
  - Total: 4,602
- Time zone: UTC+5:45 (Nepal Time)

VDC Map of Rupandehi District

Dhakdhai is a village development committee in Rupandehi District in Lumbini Province of southern Nepal. At the time of the 1991 Nepal census it had a population of 4602 people living in 731 individual households.
