= Chhotaki Ramnaga =

Coordinates: 27°33′N 83°34′E

V.D.C Chhotki Ramnagar छोटकी रामनगार
- Village development committee
- Omsatiya - 6
- Interactive map of V.D.C Chhotki Ramnagar
- Country: Nepal
- Province: Lumbini Province
- District: Rupandehi District

Government
  - Type: Rural Municipality government

Population (1991)
  - Total: 4,791
- Time zone: UTC+5:45 (Nepal Time)
- Postcode: 32901
- Area code: 071
- Villages: Belahiya, Narayanpur, Kewattoliya, Majhauli, Dadwa, jamuhani, Betwaliya, Naudihwa, Bindraban

Chhotki Ramnagar is a village development committee in Rupandehi District of Lumbini Province, southern (Western development Region) Nepal. At the time of the 1991 Nepal census, it had a population of 4,791 living in 761 households. Now from 2073 B.S, it changed to Omsatiya Rural Municipality Ward Number 6 (six). This Municipality has total 6 wards now.

== Ramjanki Mandir ==
Temple of Ramjanki (Durga Maa)

Ramjanki Mandir is a temple situated in the village. This temple has its own value of Hinduism. Local benefactors donated 54,440 sq.ft. of farm land to the Ramjanki Temple, established in 2009.
