= Silautiya =

Silautiya सिलौटिया
- Village development committee
- Location in Nepal
- Coordinates: 27.41°N 83.37°E
- Country: Nepal
- Province: Lumbini Province
- District: Rupandehi District

Population (1991)
  - Total: 2,762
- Time zone: UTC+5:45 (Nepal Time)

Silautiya is a village development committee in Rupandehi District in Lumbini Province of southern Nepal. At the time of the 1991 Nepal census it had a population of 2762 people living in 417 individual households.

== Notable people ==
- Krishna Chaudhary (1989)
- Shankar Chaudhary (1989)
