= Dhamauli =

Ahirauli Ahirauli
- Village development committee
- Location in Nepal
- Coordinates: 27.53°N 83.32°E
- Country: Nepal
- Province: Lumbini Province
- District: Rupandehi District

Government
  - Chairman: Mr. Abdul Kalam

Population (1991)
  - Total: 4,060
- Time zone: UTC+5:45 (Nepal Time)
- Area code: 00977-071

Dhamauli is a village development committee in Rupandehi District in Lumbini Province of southern Nepal. At the time of the 1991 Nepal census it had a population of 4060 people living in 628 individual households.
