= Patekhauli =

Patkhauli पटखौली
- Village development committee
- Location in Nepal
- Coordinates: 27.53°N 83.53°E
- Country: Nepal
- Province: Lumbini Province
- District: Rupandehi District

Population (1991)
  - Total: 4,900
- Time zone: UTC+5:45 (Nepal Time)

Patekhouli is a village development committee in Rupandehi District in Lumbini Province of southern Nepal. At the time of the 1991 Nepal census it had a population of 4900.
