= Kanhaiya Baniya =

Nepalese politician

Honourable Kanhaiya Baniya
- कन्हैया बनिया

Member of the House of Representatives
- Incumbent
- Assumed office 26 March 2026
- Preceded by: Sarbendra Nath Shukla
- Constituency: Rupandehi 4

Member of Lumbini Provincial Assembly
- In office 2022 – 19 January 2026
- Constituency: Rupandehi 4(A)

Personal details
- Party: Rastriya Swatantra Party (since 2026); Loktantrik Samajwadi Party, Nepal (until 2026)

Kanhaiya Baniya (Nepali: कन्हैया बनिया) is a Nepalese politician belonging to the Loktantrik Samajwadi Party, Nepal. He is also a member of Lumbini Provincial Assembly for Rupandehi 4(A).

Baniya is deputy leader of the party in provincial assembly.
