= Pharena =

Pharena फरेना
- Village development committee
- Location in Nepal
- Coordinates: 27.39°N 83.30°E
- Country: Nepal
- Province: Lumbini Province
- District: Rupandehi District

Population (1991)
  - Total: 2,817
- Time zone: UTC+5:45 (Nepal Time)

Pharena is a village development committee in Rupandehi District in Lumbini Province of southern Nepal. At the time of the 1991 Nepal census, it had a population of 2,817 people living in 400 individual households.
