= Tarkulaha =

Coordinates: 28°5′N 84°41′E

Tarkulaha तार्कुलाहा
- Village development committee
- Interactive map of Tarkulaha
- Country: Nepal
- Province: Lumbini Province
- District: Rupandehi District

Population (1991)
  - Total: 3,290
- Time zone: UTC+5:45 (Nepal Time)

Tarkulaha is a village development committee in Rupandehi District in Lumbini Province of Southern Nepal. At the time of the 1991 Nepal census it had a population of 3290 people living in 533 individual households.
