= Sipawa =

Sipawa सिपवा
- Village development committee
- Location in Nepal
- Coordinates: 27.45°N 83.31°E
- Country: Nepal
- Province: Lumbini Province
- District: Rupandehi District

Population (1991)
  - Total: 5,559
- Time zone: UTC+5:45 (Nepal Time)

Sipawa is a village development committee in Rupandehi District in Lumbini Province of southern Nepal. At the time of the 1991 Nepal census it had a population of 5559 people living in 809 individual households.
