= Amawa Marchawar =

Place in Nepal

Marchawar मर्चवार
- Village development committee
- Country: Nepal
- Province: Lumbini Province
- District: Rupandehi District

Population (1991)
  - Total: 3,221
- Time zone: UTC+5:45 (Nepal Time)

Marchawar is a village development committee in Rupandehi District in Lumbini Province of southern Nepal. At the time of the 1991 Nepal census it had a population of 3221 people living in 486 individual households.
