= Torture of Prashanta Pandey =

2011 torturing of medical assistant in Rupandehi District, Nepal

- Location: Rupandehi District, Nepal
- Date: April 2011
- Injuries: unlawful detention and subjected to torture
- Victim: Prashanta Pandey
- Perpetrator: Nepal Police

Prashanta Pandey, a medical assistant, was forcibly arrested without a warrant or reasons being given on 7 April 2011 in Rupandehi. He was taken to Lumbini Zonal Police Office and was held in unlawful detention and subjected to torture and was forced to sign a confession about involvement in a bomb explosion perpetrated on 27 March 2011. Two years after his arrest, on 13 June 2012, the Rupandehi court sentenced Pandey to one year's imprisonment, saying that although Pandey was not involved in planting the bomb, he was involved in the preparation of the attack. He had already spend the duration during the trial and was thus released.

== Courts and Legal Fights ==
He claimed that he was forced to confess the involvement in the bombing, and filed a case at the Supreme Court on 23 January 2013, demanding the investigation and action on the matters of his torture and Human Rights violation. In February 2014, TRIAL, on behalf of Prashanta Pandey, submitted a communication to the Human Rights Committee (HRC) demanding justice for Mr. Pandey's alleged human rights violations. The complaint requests the HRC to issue a finding confirming the violation of human rights and conduct a swift, exhaustive, and independent investigation into these alleged crimes.
