= Bagaha, Nepal =

Bagaha बगाहा
- Village development committee
- Location in Nepal
- Coordinates: 27.49°N 83.49°E
- Country: Nepal
- Province: Lumbini Province
- District: Rupandehi District

Government
  - Type: Local government

Population (1991)
  - Total: 3,770
- Time zone: UTC+5:45 (Nepal Time)

Bagaha is a village development committee in Rupandehi District in Lumbini Province of southern Nepal. At the time of the 1991 Nepal census it had a population of 3770 people living in 559 individual households.
