= Shankar Nagar =

Coordinates: 27°39′N 83°28′E

Shankar Nagar शंकरनगर
- Interactive map of Shankar Nagar
- Country: Nepal
- Province: Lumbini Province
- District: Rupandehi District

Population (1991 AD)
  - Total: 9,466
- Time zone: UTC+5:45 (Nepal Time)

VDC Map of Rupandehi District

Shankar Nagar is a town in Tilottama Municipality in Rupandehi District in Lumbini Province of southern Nepal. The formerly village development committee was merged to form new municipality on 18 May 2014 AD. At the time of the 1991 AD Nepal census it had a population of 9466 people living in 1694 individual households.
