= Pokharvindi =

Pokharvindi पोखरभिन्डी
- Village development committee
- Location in Nepal
- Coordinates: 27.50°N 83.53°E
- Country: Nepal
- Province: Lumbini Province
- District: Rupandehi District

Population (2001)
  - Total: 5,745
- Time zone: UTC+5:45 (Nepal Time)

Pokharvindi is a village development committee in Rupandehi District in Lumbini Province of southern Nepal. At the time of the 1991 Nepal census it had a population of 3930.
