= Hanaiya =

Harnaiya हर्नैया
- Village development committee
- Interactive map of Harnaiya
- Country: Nepal
- Province: Lumbini Province
- District: Rupandehi District

Population (1991)
  - Total: 3,089
- Time zone: UTC+5:45 (Nepal Time)

Harnaiya is a village development committee in Rupandehi District in Lumbini Province of southern Nepal. At the time of the 1991 Nepal census it had a population of 3089 people living in 465 individual households.
