= Gonaha =

Gonaha गोनहा
- Village
- Location in Nepal
- Coordinates: 27.49°N 83.37°E
- Country: Nepal
- Province: Lumbini Province
- District: Rupandehi District

Population (1991)
  - Total: 10,838
- Time zone: UTC+5:45 (Nepal Time)

Gonaha is a village in Rupandehi District in Lumbini Province of southern Nepal. At the time of the 1991 Nepal census it had a population of 10,838.

Formerly, Gonaha was a village development committee (VDC), which were local-level administrative units. In 2017, the government of Nepal restructured local government in line with the 2015 constitution and VDCs were discontinued.
