= Pakadi Sakron =

Pakadi Sakron पकडी सक्रोन kotahi mai gawa palika word6
- Village development committee
- Nickname: sakron pakadi
- Location in Nepal
- Coordinates: 27.47°N 83.33°E
- Country: Nepal
- Province: Lumbini Province
- District: Rupandehi District

Population (1991)
  - Total: 4,616
- Time zone: UTC+5:45 (Nepal Time)

Pakadi Sakron is a village development committee in Rupandehi District in Lumbini Province of southern Nepal. At the time of the 1991 Nepal census it had a population of 4616.
