= Amuwa Paschim =

Coordinates: 27°36′N 83°23′E

Amuwa Paschim अमुवा पश्चिम
- Village development committee
- Interactive map of Amuwa Paschim
- Country: Nepal
- Province: Lumbini Province
- District: Rupandehi District

Population (1991)
  - Total: 6,870
- Time zone: UTC+5:45 (Nepal Time)

Amuwa Paschim is a village development committee in Rupandehi District in Lumbini Province of southern Nepal. It is one of the richest VDC in rupandehi district. A new four lane highway has been under construction between belbas to bethari via amuwa. connecting to Lumbini this highway will be one of the rupandehi's and nepal's standard highway. At the time of the 1991 Nepal census it had a population of 6870 people living in 1127 individual households.
