= Madhuwani =

Madhuwani मधुवनी
- Location in Nepal
- Coordinates: 27.47°N 83.30°E
- Country: Nepal
- Province: Lumbini Province
- District: Rupandehi District

Population (1991)
  - Total: 4,267
- Time zone: UTC+5:45 (Nepal Time)

Madhuwani is a town under Lumbini Cultural Municipality in Rupandehi District in Lumbini Province of southern Nepal. This was under a village administration and was merged to the municipality following a government decision implemented on 18 May 2014.

At the time of the 1991 Nepal census it had a population of 4267 people living in 707 individual households.
