= Dudharakchhe =

Dudharakchhe दुधराक्ष
- Location in Nepal
- Coordinates: 27.72°N 83.31°E
- Country: Nepal
- Province: Lumbini Province
- District: Rupandehi District

Population (1991)
  - Total: 10,684
- Time zone: UTC+5:45 (Nepal Time)

Dudharakchhe is a town in Sainamaina Municipality in Rupandehi District in Lumbini Province of southern Nepal. The former VDC was merged to establish the new municipality on 18 May 2014 with the two existing VDCs i.e. Dudharakchhe and Parroha. At the time of the 1991 Nepal census it had a population of 10,684 people living in 1952 individual households.
