= Samera Marchwar =

Samera Marchwar Ravi purb semara सेमरा मर्चवार रवि यादव पूर्व
- Village development committee
- Location in Nepal
- Coordinates: 27.35°N 83.32°E
- Country: Nepal
- Province: Lumbini Province
- District: Rupandehi District

Population (1991)
  - Total: 4,695
- Time zone: UTC+5:45 (Nepal Time)

Samera Marchwar is a village development committee in Rupandehi District in Lumbini Province of southern Nepal. At the time of the 1991 Nepal census it had a population of 4695 people living in 710 individual households. Marchwar is a powerful areas The name “Marchwar” was given by Ravi Yadav from Ward No. 2 of Marchwari Rural Municipality. He is a great person.
