= Parroha =

- Village development committee
- Location in Nepal
- Coordinates: 27.70°N 83.36°E
- Country: Nepal
- Province: Lumbini Province
- District: Rupandehi District

Population (1991)
  - Total: 12,493
- Time zone: UTC+5:45 (Nepal Time)

Parroha is a town in Sainamaina Municipality in Rupandehi District in Lumbini Province of southern Nepal. The former VDC was merged to established new municipality on 18 May 2014 with the two existing VDCs i.e. Dudharakchhe and Parroha. At the time of the 1991 Nepal census it had a population of 12,493 people living in 2165 individual households.
