= Kataya =

Kataya कटया
- Village development committee
- Country: Nepal
- Province: Lumbini Province
- District: Rupandehi District

Population (1991)
  - Total: 3,507
- Time zone: UTC+5:45 (Nepal Time)

Kataya is a village development committee in Rupandehi District in Lumbini Province of southern Nepal. At the time of the 1991 Nepal census it had a population of 3507 people living in 532 individual households.
