= Chilhiya =

Chilhiya चिल्हिया
- Village development committee
- Location in Nepal
- Coordinates: 27.55°N 83.45°E
- Country: Nepal
- Province: Lumbini Province
- District: Rupandehi District

Population (1991)
  - Total: 3,895
- Time zone: UTC+5:45 (Nepal Time)

Chilhiya is a village development committee in Rupandehi District in Lumbini Province of southern Nepal. At the time of the 1991 Nepal census it had a population of 3895 people living in 635 individual households.
