= Pajarkatli =

Coordinates: 27°29′N 83°31′E

Pajarkatti पजरकतली
- Village development committee
- Interactive map of Pajarkatti
- Country: Nepal
- Province: Lumbini Province
- District: Rupandehi District

Population (1991)
  - Total: 4,372
- Time zone: UTC+5:45 (Nepal Time)

Pajarkatti is a village development committee in Rupandehi District in Lumbini Province of southern Nepal. At the time of the 1991 Nepal census it had a population of 4372 people living in 633 individual households.
