= Tenahawa =

Tenuhawa तेनहवा
- Country: Nepal
- Province: Lumbini Province
- District: Rupandehi District

Population (1991)
  - Total: 3,204
- Time zone: UTC+5:45 (Nepal Time)

Tenahawa is a town in the Lumbini Cultural Municipality in Rupandehi District in Lumbini Province of southern Nepal. It was under a village administration and was merged to the municipality following a government decision implemented on 18 May 2014.

At the time of the 1991 Nepal census it had a population of 3,204 living in 477 individual households.
