= Pramod Kumar Yadav (Nepali poilitician) =

Nepalese politician

- प्रमोद कुमार यादव

Member of Parliament, Pratinidhi Sabha
- Incumbent
- Assumed office 4 March 2018
- Preceded by: Bishnu Prasad Paudel
- Constituency: Rupandehi 4

Personal details
- Born: 14 April 1979 (age 46) Rupandehi District
- Party: Nepali Congress

Pramod Kumar Yadav is a Nepalese politician, belonging to the Nepali Congress currently serving as a member of the 1st Federal Parliament of Nepal. In the 2017 Nepalese general election he was elected from the Rupandehi 4 constituency, securing 31,718 (51.99%) votes.

Beyond politics, Yadav is also known for his involvement in business. He is the owner of the Bodhi Red Sun Hotel, a well-regarded hospitality establishment in the Lumbini region. He is noted for supporting community development and promoting tourism in the area.

Yadav is recognized as a family-oriented individual and is often described as maintaining close ties with his community. His family has been praised locally for their social engagement and contributions to cultural and social activities.
