= Tharki =

Coordinates: 27°24′N 83°23′E

Tharki थार्कि
- Village development committee
- Interactive map of Tharki
- Country: Nepal
- Province: Lumbini Province
- District: Rupandehi District

Population (1991)
  - Total: 3,588
- Time zone: UTC+5:45 (Nepal Time)

Tharki is a village development committee in Rupandehi District in Lumbini Province of southern Nepal. At the time of the 1991 Nepal census it had a population of 3588 people living in 561 individual households.
