= Khudabazar =

Coordinates: 27°30′N 83°19′E

Khudabagar खुदाबगर
- Interactive map of Khudabagar
- Country: Nepal
- Province: Lumbini Province
- District: Rupandehi District

Government

Population (1991)
  - Total: 3,602
- Time zone: UTC+5:45 (Nepal Time)

Khudabazar is a town under Lumbini Cultural Municipality in Rupandehi District in Lumbini Province of southern Nepal. This was under a village administration and was merged to the municipality following a government decision implemented on 18 May 2014.

At the time of the 1991 Nepal census it had a population of 3602 people living in 509 individual households.
