= Masina, Rupandehi =

Coordinates: 27°31′N 83°15′E

Masina, Bormasina.............. मसिना
- Interactive map of Masina, Bormasina..............
- Country: Nepal
- Province: Lumbini Province
- District: Rupandehi District

Population (1991)
  - Total: 4,282
- Time zone: UTC+5:45 (Nepal Time)

Masina is a town under Lumbini Cultural Municipality in Rupandehi District in Lumbini Province of southern Nepal. This was under a village administration and was merged to the municipality following a government decision implemented on 18 May 2014.

At the time of the 1991 Nepal census it had a population of 4282 people residing in 673 individual households.
