= 2022 Tilottama municipal election =

Local election in Nepal

Municipal election for Tilottama took place on 13 May 2022, across 17 wards. The electorate elected a mayor, a deputy mayor, 17 ward chairs. Ram Krishna Khand from Nepali Congress was elected as mayor of the municipality.

== Background ==
Tilottama was established on May 8, 2014, when the Government of Nepal announced additional 72 municipalities, including previously proposed 37 municipalities in line with the Local Self-governance Act, 1999. On July 25, 2014; demarcation of the municipality was done along with the assignment of new wards.

In the previous election, Basu Dev Ghimire from CPN (Unified Marxist–Leninist) was elected as mayor.

== Candidates ==
Party	Mayor candidate
Nepali Congress	Ram Krishna Khand
Nepal Communist Party	Mohan Chapagain
Rastriya Janamukti Party	Sundar Gurung
Rastriya Prajatantra Party	Bhuwan Sharma Khanal

== Results ==
=== Mayoral election ===
Mayoral elections result
Party	Candidate	Votes	%	±%
Congress	Ram Krishna Khand	24,396		
CPN (UML)	Mohan Chapagain	23,631		
Janamukti	Sundar Gurung	5,614		
RPP	Bhuwan Sharma Khanal	3,338		
Others		2,441		
Total votes		59420		
Congress gain from CPN (UML)		Swing		
