= Dayanagar =

Dayanagar (siyari) दयानगर Chhapiya
- Rural Municipality
- Interactive map of Dayanagar (siyari)
- Coordinates: 27°34′N 83°21′E
- Country: Nepal
- Province: Lumbini Province
- District: Rupandehi District

Government
  - Type: Monarch

Population (1991)
  - Total: 7,542
- Time zone: UTC+5:45 (Nepal Time)

Dayanagar (Siyari) is a Rural Municipality in Rupandehi District in Lumbini Province of southern Nepal. At the time of the 1991 Nepal census it had a population of 7542 people living in 1265 individual households.
