= Bhagawanpur =

Bhagawanpur may refer to several places:

- In Nepal:
  - Bhagawanpur, Lumbini
  - Bhagawanpur, Sagarmatha
- In India:
  - Bhagawanpur, Varanasi
  - Bhagawanpur, West Bengal - in Purba Medinipur district
