= Man Pakadi =

Coordinates: 27.6167°N 83.3667°E

Man Pakadi मन पकाडी
- Village development committee
- Interactive map of Man Pakadi
- Country: Nepal
- Province: Lumbini Province
- District: Rupandehi District

Population (1991)
  - Total: 4,839
- Time zone: UTC+5:45 (Nepal Time)

Man Pakadi is a village development committee in Rupandehi District in Lumbini Province of southern Nepal. At the time of the 1991 Nepal census it had a population of 4839 people living in 741 individual households.
