= Karaiya =

Karaiya may refer to:

- Karaiya, Lumbini, Nepal
- Karaiya, Narayani, Nepal
