= Sikatahan =

Sikatahan सिकाताहान
- Village development committee
- Location in Nepal
- Coordinates: 27.57°N 83.55°E
- Country: Nepal
- Province: Lumbini Province
- District: Rupandehi District

Population (1991)
  - Total: 6,044
- Time zone: UTC+5:45 (Nepal Time)

Sikatahan is a village development committee in Rupandehi District in Lumbini Province of southern Nepal. At the time of the 1991 Nepal census it had a population of 6044 people living in 911 individual households.
