= Murgiya =

Coordinates: 28°40′N 81°05′E

Murgiya is a town in Sainamaina Municipality, Rupandehi District, Lumbini Province, Nepal. As of 2014, the town has a permanent live bird market.

== Religious Places ==
Murgiya is also popular as a religious site, its temples include:

- Parroha Mandir
- Nawa Durga Bhawani Mandir
- Rani Kuwa

== Education ==
Schools and colleges include:

- Sungabha Public School
- Parroha Multiple Campus
- Prabhat English Boarding Secondary School

== Sports ==
Murgiya has a local football club, Murgiya FC.
