= Karahiya, Rupandehi =

Karahiya करहिया
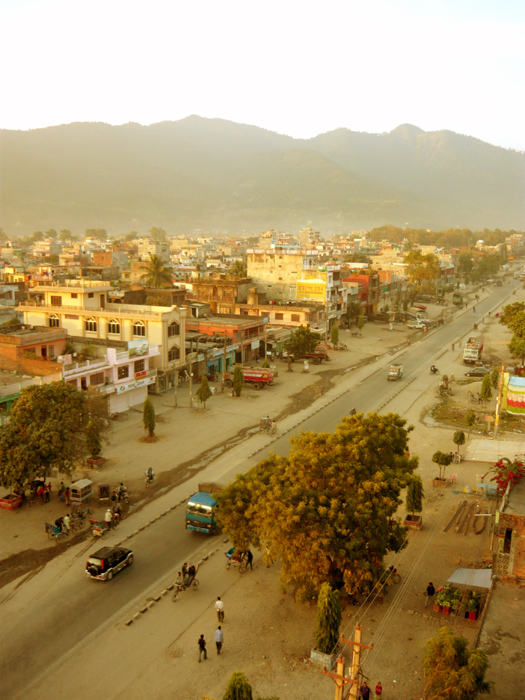
- View of Butwal, Near karahiya
- Nickname: Karahiya VDC
- Location in Nepal
- Coordinates: 27°42′N 83°27′E
- Country: Nepal
- Development Region: Western
- Province: Lumbini Province
- District: Rupandehi District
- VDC: Butwal
- Time zone: UTC+5:45 (Nepal Time)
- Website: www.butwalmun.org.np

Karahiya is a town in Tilottama Municipality in Rupandehi District in Lumbini Province of southern Nepal. The former village development committee was merged to form the new municipality on 18 May 2014. It is located halfway between Butwal and Bhairahawa in the foothills of Chhure range and on the bank of Tinau River. Its climate is moderate, slightly hot in summer and moderately cool in winter. Temperature records are 35.9 °C (96.6 °F) and 11.5 °C (52.7 °F). At the time of the 1991 Nepal census it had a population of 10,550 people living in 1992 individual households.

== People ==
People of many castes like Brahman, Gurung, Magar, Kshtri, Tharu, Muslims and others with various religions live there. It consists of about nine wards. Now, the then karahiya VDC is a part of तिलोत्तमा नगरपालिका. As the area lies near to the Indian state of UP, people follow various rituals and the people near the border have deep influence of Indian rites and rituals.
