= Rohini Rural Municipality =

Rohini Rural Municipality रोहिणी गाउँपालिका
- Gaunpalika
- Location in Nepal
- Coordinates: 27.514097°N 83.538675°E
- Country: Nepal
- Province: Lumbini Province
- District: Rupandehi District

Area
  - Total: 64.62 km^{2} (24.95 sq mi)

Population
  - Total: 37,175
  - Density: 575.3/km^{2} (1,490/sq mi)
- Time zone: UTC+5:45 (Nepal Time)
- Website: http://rohinimun.gov.np/

Rohini Rural Municipality (Nepali :रोहिणी गाउँपालिका) is a Gaunpalika in Rupandehi District in Lumbini Province of Nepal. On 12 March 2017, the government of Nepal implemented a new local administrative structure, with the implementation of the new local administrative structure, VDCs have been replaced with municipal and Village Councils. Rohini is one of these 753 local units.
