= Shree Shivapur Higher Secondary School =

Secondary school in Nepal

Information
- Established: 1961; 65 years ago

Shree Shivapur Higher Secondary School is a higher secondary school located in Makrahar, Rupandehi District, Nepal. The school celebrated its 50th anniversary in 2011.

One of the faculty is a member of the Nepal English Language Teachers Association.
