= Omsatiya Rural Municipality =

Omsatiya Rural Municipality ओमसतीया गाउँपालिका
- Gaunpalika
- Location in Nepal
- Coordinates: 27.542662°N 83.491016°E
- Country: Nepal
- Province: Lumbini Province
- District: Rupandehi District

Area
  - Total: 48.58 km^{2} (18.76 sq mi)

Population
  - Total: 34,191
  - Density: 703.8/km^{2} (1,823/sq mi)
- Time zone: UTC+5:45 (Nepal Time)
- Website: http://omsatiyamun.gov.np/

Omsatiya Rural Municipality (Nepali :ओमसतीया गाउँपालिका) is a Gaunpalika (administrative division) in Rupandehi District in Lumbini Province of Nepal. On 12 March 2017, the government of Nepal implemented a new local administrative structure, with the implementation of the new local administrative structure, VDCs have been replaced with municipal and Village Councils. Omsatiya is one of these 753 local units.
