= Bhagawanpur, Rupandehi =

Coordinates: 27°26′N 83°17′E

Bhagawanpur भगवानपुर
- Interactive map of Bhagawanpur
- Country: Nepal
- Province: Lumbini Province
- District: Rupandehi District

Population (1991)
  - Total: 3,190
- Time zone: UTC+5:45 (Nepal Time)

Bhagawanpur is a town under Lumbini Cultural Municipality in Rupandehi District in Lumbini Province of southern Nepal. This was under a village administration and was merged to the municipality following a government decision implemented on 18 May 2014.

At the time of the 1991 Nepal census, it had a population of 3190 people living in 526 individual households.
