= Basudev Ghimire =

Nepali politician

- बासु देव घिमिरे

Member of Parliament, Pratinidhi Sabha
- Incumbent
- Assumed office 26 December 2022
- Preceded by: Bharat Kumar Shah
- Constituency: Rupandehi 5

Personal details
- Born: 27 January 1968 (age 58) Gulmi District
- Party: CPN (UML)

Basudev Ghimire is a Nepalese politician, belonging to the CPN (UML), currently serving as a member of the 2nd Federal Parliament of Nepal. In the 2022 Nepalese general election, he was elected from Rupandehi 5 (constituency).
