= Bhalwari =

Bhalwari भलवारी
- Tilottama Municipality, Ward No: 7
- Location in Nepal
- Coordinates: 27°35′59.6″N 83°28′19.9″E
- Country: Nepal
- Province: Lumbini Province
- District: Rupandehi District
- Municipality: Tilottama Municipality
- Time zone: UTC+5:45 (Nepal Time)

Bhalwari is a small town in the Rupandehi District in Nepal. It is located Tilottama municipality ward no. 9 near two larger towns, 12 km south of Butwal and 10 km north of Bhairahawa.

== Etymology ==
The name Bhalwari derives from the word bhal in Nepali, the Nepalese language, and means "force of the water". The settlement was named as such because it experienced frequent flooding in the past.

== Population ==
Most of the population consists of Pahadi people who migrated from nearby villages. The settlement also has a significant number of Madhesi people.

== Culture and religion ==
The majority of the population of Bhalwari trace their ancestry to nearby hilly regions of Palpa, Arghakhanchi, and Syangja. Because of this, Butwal's culture is significantly influenced by the Pahadi. The population is predominantly Hindu and Buddhist. The majority of the people are Gurung, Tharu, Thakuri, Brahman, Chhetri, and Magar. There are some Muslims, as well, who are of Madhesi origin.

The major festivals celebrated are Holi, Teej, Maha Shivratri, Losar, Dashain, Tihar and Bhai Tika. Since the majority of the population are from nearby villages, most of them go to their native villages during the month-long festivities. From Dashain to Tihar, the town becomes nearly deserted.

== Economy ==
The main economy of the Bhalwari is agriculture and small-scale industries. There is one oil store, Nepal Oil Corporation, which has 4 large tanks. There are many rice mills, including Siddhababa Rice Mill, Siddhartha Rice Mill, Om Shiva Rice Mill, Deurali Rice Mill, Pathak Rice Mill, and PnP general stores.

There are other medium-scale industries, such as the JK Soap & Cosmetics and Siddhababa Distillery. There are one commercial bank, two development banks, and several co-operatives. Nabil Bank is one of these commercial banks. Bhrikutee Development Bank and Purnima Development Bank have Class B banking licenses from Nepal Rastra Bank.

== Transportation ==
As in most of Nepal, buses are the major means of transportation, with many private operators running bus services between popular destinations. Until 2003, most of the bus fleet was made up of large, old buses. Since then, operators have purchased newer, smaller buses, commonly called Micro because of their small size. There is frequent Micro service between Butwal and Bhairahawa. Older vehicles are also used to ferry people to nearby hilly regions. Apart from this, rickshaws are also a popular means of transport and can be found in abundance in Bhalwari. There are also many taxies, making it is easier to go anywhere, day or night. Bicycles, motorbikes, and cars are also common means of personal transportation around town.

== Education ==
There are several educational institutions in Bhalwari. There are five private primary level schools and one government school. The main educational institution of the town is Lumbini Engineering College. It is the only engineering college in the Lumbini zone. Other Private Schools include Araniko English High School, St. Joseph, Little Paradise, and one Montessori school, Pioneer Kids Montessori.
