= Kanchan Rural Municipality =

Kanchan Rural Municipality कञ्चन गाउँपालिका
- Gaunpalika
- Location in Nepal
- Coordinates: 27°38′30″N 83°16′15″E
- Country: Nepal
- Province: Lumbini Province
- District: Rupandehi District

Area
  - Total: 58.51 km^{2} (22.59 sq mi)

Population
  - Total: 33,072
  - Density: 565.2/km^{2} (1,464/sq mi)
- Time zone: UTC+5:45 (Nepal Time)
- Website: https://kanchanmun.gov.np/

Kanchan Rural Municipality (Nepali :कञ्चन गाउँपालिका) is a Gaunpalika in Rupandehi District in Lumbini Province of Nepal. On 12 March 2017, the government of Nepal implemented a new local administrative structure, with the implementation of the new local administrative structure, VDCs have been replaced with municipal and Village Councils.Rudrapur VDC and Gajedi VDC was merged to become Kanchan Rural Municipality. Kanchan is one of these 753 local units.

== Places ==
Government Office of Kanchan Rural Municipality is located in Kanchan 2, Deuri.

Gajedi Lake also known as danapurtaal is the lake in Kanchan Rural Municipality, located in Ward no 1, this 19.6 hectare wetland is popular for boating, picnic and birdwatching.

Panbari Kanchan River Park is a riverside retreat alongside the Kanchan river, perfect place for picnic and walking.

Sungabha Harnachaur Shanti Park is a local park ideal for unwinding and enjoying nature.

Karma Tashi Chhyoling Gumba is a Buddhist monastery that offers insights into the local cultural diversity.

== Wards ==
Kanchan Rural Municipality contains 5 wards.
