= Siyari Rural Municipality =

Siyari Rural Municipality सियारी गाउँपालिका
- Gaunpalika
- Location in Nepal
- Coordinates: 27.566241°N 83.401469°E
- Country: Nepal
- Province: Lumbini Province
- District: Rupandehi District

Area
  - Total: 66.17 km^{2} (25.55 sq mi)

Population
  - Total: 38,466
  - Density: 581.3/km^{2} (1,506/sq mi)
- Time zone: UTC+5:45 (Nepal Time)
- Website: http://siyarimun.gov.np/

Siyari Rural Municipality (Nepali :सियारी गाउँपालिका) is a Municipality in Rupandehi District in Lumbini Province of Nepal. On 12 March 2017, the government of Nepal implemented a new local administrative structure, with the implementation of the new local administrative structure, VDCs have been replaced with municipal and Village Councils. Siyari is one of these 753 local units.

There are 7 wards in Siyari Gaunpalika which is a combination of former Chilhiya, Mainahiya, Harnaiya, Dayanagar and West Amawaa VDC.
