= Gaidahawa Rural Municipality =

Gaidahawa Rural Municipality गैडहवा गाउँपालिका
- Gaunpalika
- Location in Nepal
- Coordinates: 27.556416°N 83.294333°E
- Country: Nepal
- Province: Lumbini Province
- District: Rupandehi District

Area
  - Total: 96.8 km^{2} (37.4 sq mi)

Population
  - Total: 37,013
  - Density: 382/km^{2} (990/sq mi)
- Time zone: UTC+5:45 (Nepal Time)
- Website: https://gaidahawamun.gov.np/

Gaidahawa Rural Municipality (Nepali :गैडहवा गाउँपालिका) is a Gaunpalika in Rupandehi District in Lumbini Province of Nepal. On 12 March 2017, the government of Nepal implemented a new local administrative structure, with the implementation of the new local administrative structure, VDCs have been replaced with municipal and Village Councils. Gaidahawa is one of these 753 local units.

The Chairperson of the Gaidahawa Rural Municipality is Mr. Surendra Poudyal.
