= Bharat Kumar Shah =

Nepalese politician

- भरत कुमार शाह

Member of Parliament, Pratinidhi Sabha
- Incumbent
- Assumed office 4 March 2018
- Constituency: Rupandehi 5
- In office May 1999 – May 2002
- Preceded by: Bishnu Prasad Paudel
- Succeeded by: Jyotendra Mohan Chaudhary
- Constituency: Rupandehi 4

Member of Constituent Assembly
- In office 21 January 2014 – 14 October 2017
- Preceded by: Ramnath Dhakal
- Constituency: Rupandehi 5

Personal details
- Born: 30 July 1954 (age 71) Salyan District, Nepal
- Party: Nepali Congress
- Occupation: Politician; businessman

Bharat Kumar Shah is a Nepalese politician. He was elected to the Pratinidhi Sabha in the 1999 election on behalf of the Nepali Congress. Shah was the NC candidate in the Rupandehi-5 constituency for the 2008 Constituent Assembly election and was the Nepali Congress candidate in the Rupandehi-5 constituency for the new Constituent assembly election and won the election.

== Personal life ==
Bharat Shah has a wife Anita Shah and two sons.
