= Sarbendra Nath Shukla =

Nepalese politician

Honourable Sarbendra Nath Shukla
- सर्वेन्द्र नाथ शुक्ला

Member of Parliament, Pratinidhi Sabha
- Incumbent
- Assumed office 22 December 2022
- Constituency: Rupandehi 4

Personal details
- Born: 29 December 1949 (age 76)
- Party: Loktantrik Samajwadi
- Other party: RPP; TMLP; RJPN
- Spouse: Niranjana Shukla
- Parent: Surendra Nath Shukla (father)

Sarbendra Nath Shukla is a Nepalese politician, belonging to the Loktantrik Samajwadi Party currently serving as the member of the 2nd Federal Parliament of Nepal. In the 2022 Nepalese general election, he won the election from Rupandehi 4 (constituency).
