= Ramnath Dhakal =

Nepali politician

Personal details
- Party: CPN UML

Ramnath Dhakal (Nepali: रामनाथ ढकाल, 20 December 1962 – 5 April 2015) was a Nepalese politician, belonging to the Communist Party of Nepal (Unified Marxist-Leninist). In the 2008 Constituent Assembly election he was elected from the Rupandehi-5 constituency, winning 11,080 votes. On 5 April 2015, Dhakal died of swine flu and other diseases at the Grande International Hospital in Kathmandu.
