= Sammarimai Rural Municipality =

Sammarimai Rural Municipality सम्मरीमाई गाउँपालिका
- Gaunpalika
- Location in Nepal
- Coordinates: 27.371023°N 83.313881°E
- Country: Nepal
- Province: Lumbini Province
- District: Rupandehi District

Area
  - Total: 50.78 km^{2} (19.61 sq mi)

Population
  - Total: 38,305
  - Density: 754.3/km^{2} (1,954/sq mi)
- Time zone: UTC+5:45 (Nepal Time)
- Website: http://sammarimaimun.gov.np/

Sammarimai Rural Municipality (Nepali :सम्मरीमाई गाउँपालिका) is a Gaunpalika in Rupandehi District in Lumbini Province of Nepal. On 12 March 2017, the government of Nepal implemented a new local administrative structure, with the implementation of the new local administrative structure, VDCs have been replaced with municipal and Village Councils. Sammarimai is one of these 753 local units.
