= Kotahimai Rural Municipality =

Kotahimai Rural Municipality कोटहीमाई गाउँपालिका
- Gaunpalika
- Location in Nepal
- Coordinates: 27.443680°N 83.350302°E
- Country: Nepal
- Province: Lumbini Province
- District: Rupandehi District

Area
  - Total: 58.26 km^{2} (22.49 sq mi)

Population
  - Total: 41,006
  - Density: 703.8/km^{2} (1,823/sq mi)
- Time zone: UTC+5:45 (Nepal Time)
- Website: http://kotahimaimun.gov.np/

Kotahimai Rural Municipality (Nepali :कोटहीमाई गाउँपालिका) is a Gaunpalika in Rupandehi District in Lumbini Province of Nepal. On 12 March 2017, the government of Nepal implemented a new local administrative structure, with the implementation of the new local administrative structure, VDCs have been replaced with municipal and Village Councils. Kotahimai is one of these 753 local units.
