= Suddhodhan Rural Municipality =

Suddhodan Rural Municipality शुद्धोधन गाउँपालिकाको
- Gaunpalika
- Location in Nepal
- Coordinates: 27.643059°N 83.368020°E
- Country: Nepal
- Province: Lumbini Province
- District: Rupandehi District

Area
  - Total: 91.7 km^{2} (35.4 sq mi)

Population
  - Total: 45,301
  - Rank: 10th (Nepal)
  - Density: 494/km^{2} (1,280/sq mi)
- Time zone: UTC+5:45 (Nepal Time)
- Website: http://shuddhodhanmunrupandehi.gov.np/

Suddhodhan is a Rural Municipality (Nepali :शुद्धोधन गाउँपालिकाको ) in Rupandehi District, Lumbini Province, Nepal. On 12 March 2017, the government of Nepal implemented a new local administrative structure, with the implementation of the new local administrative structure, VDCs have been replaced with municipal and Village Councils. Suddhodhan is one of these 753 local units.
