= Mayadevi Rural Municipality, Rupandehi =

Mayadevi Rural Municipality मायादेवी गाउँपालिका
- Gaunpalika
- Location in Nepal
- Coordinates: 27°30′40″N 83°21′40″E
- Country: Nepal
- Province: Lumbini Province
- District: Rupandehi District

Area
  - Total: 88.75 km^{2} (34.27 sq mi)

Population
  - Total: 48,479
  - Rank: 9th (Nepal)
  - Density: 546.2/km^{2} (1,415/sq mi)
- Time zone: UTC+5:45 (Nepal Time)
- Website: http://mayadevimunrupandehi.gov.np/

Mayadevi Rural Municipality (Nepali: मायादेवी गाउँपालिका) is a Gaunpalika in Rupandehi District in Lumbini Province of Nepal. On 12 March 2017, the government of Nepal implemented a new local administrative structure, with the implementation of the new local administrative structure, VDCs have been replaced with municipal and Village Councils. Mayadevi is one of these 753 local units.

== Demographics ==
Bhojpuri is the most spoken language of the Mayadevi Municipality with 71.4% people reporting it as their first language followed by Awadhi with 15.6%, Nepali with 6.5%, Tharu with 5.1% and Others with 1.4%.

Languages in Mayadevi Gaunpalika
1. Bhojpuri (71.4%)
2. Awadhi (15.6%)
3. Nepali (6.50%)
4. Tharu (5.10%)
5. Others (1.40%)
