= Sainamaina =

Sainamaina सैनामैना
- Municipality (नगरपालिका)
- Location in Nepal
- Coordinates: 27.72°N 83.31°E
- Country: Nepal
- Province: Lumbini
- District: Rupandehi

Government
  - Mayor: Phanendra Prashad Sharma (NC)
  - Deputy Mayor: Bina Rana (NCP)

Area
  - Total: 162.18 km^{2} (62.62 sq mi)

Population
  - Total: 72,648
  - Density: 344.2/km^{2} (891/sq mi)
- Time zone: UTC+5:45 (NST)
- Website: www.sainamainamun.gov.np

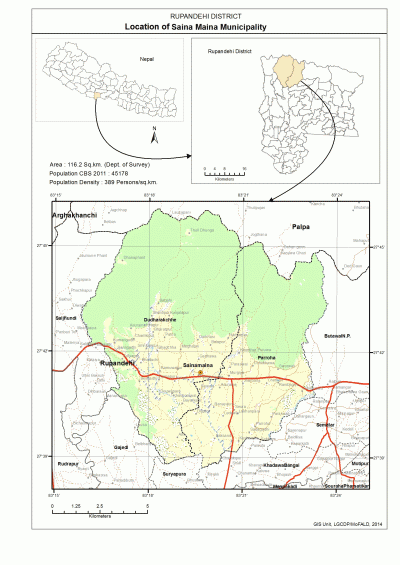

Sainamaina Municipality is one of the new 72 municipalities formed in Nepal. It is located in Rupandehi District in Lumbini Province of southern Nepal which is known for its historical and cultural significance, especially as the birthplace of Lord Buddha. The municipality was established by merging three existing VDCs i.e. Dudharakchhe, Saljhandi and Parroha. At the time of the 2021 Nepal census it had a population of 72,648 people.

== Background ==
Sainamaina Municipality is located on the northern border of the Rupandehi district between the 16 local bodies under the ancient Kapilbastu state, which represented the historical heritage in ancient times. After the formal declaration of Nepal as a federal republic country on 28 May 2008 (Jestha 15 2065 BS), Sainamaina was restructured as one of the 72 municipalities on 20 Baisakh, 2071, having a total area of 162.18 square km. To the east of this municipality is Butwal Sub-metropolitan City, to the west are Kanchan Rural Municipality and Banganga Municipality of Kapilbastu, to the north are Shitganga Municipality of Arghakhanchi and Chhahara Rural Municipality and Tinau Rural Municipality of Palpa lie in its four borders.

Nepal's only east–west connecting Mahendra highway extends through the middle of this municipality, so anyone interested in visiting this place has an easy access facility. Within this municipality territory, the Sainamaina area's boundary, where there are ancient Buddhist sites, is from Awadi in the Sorauli area to the head of the Bauraha River in the south and the northern part of the Mahendra Highway. It is a very important place from the point of view of archeology, history and culture.

== History ==
=== Historicity of Sainamaina ===
Historical facts, records and folklore can be found based on how this place came to be known as Sinamaina. Different historians have different opinions regarding the origin of the word 'Sainamaina', representing an important history story.

=== Sainamaina is a synonym of ‘Samagama ===
'Samagama' village is mentioned in the Pāsādika Sutta of the Dīgha Nikāya of the Sutta Piṭaka. Gautama Buddha gave the sermon of the Sāmagāma sutta of Majjhima Nikaya at this place Sāmagāma. It is mentioned in the Anguttara Nikaya: "Padmapushpa bloomed on the attractive and lovely Pushkarini in Samgam." Acharya Buddhaghosh has mentioned the argument that the name of this place was named Samgam and this word became Sainamaina due to the production of sama or sawn paddy in this place/village. Dr. Gitu Giri, a cultural expert who has done detailed research on Sainamaina, has also said that the ancient Samgam became Sainamaina over time. A local resident named Hema Thapa said that there was a wetland area near Ranikuwa and red and white colors of lotus flowers used to bloom there, but now a settlement has been developed in this entire area. Based on this, it can be believed that this is the place where Padma Pushpa is said to have blossomed in Pushkarini, as mentioned in Aṅguttara Nikāya. Buddhaghosa (MA.ii.829) had mentioned that samak rice used to be well grown in this gama (village), thus the name Samagama must have been kept after this fact.

The name Sainamaina also has a third context. According to Dr. Gitu Giri, there is a legend that Gautama Buddha's mother Mahamayadevi (Mayadevi) had made best friend (saina) to a beautiful girl named Maina who lived in this area at that time. So, the name of this area remained Saina Maina.

 According to Dr. Bishnu Ghimire, Percival, a scholar from London, after visiting this place, mentioned it as Buddha's palace (128). The said palace was one of the three palaces built by King Suddhodhana so that his son Siddhartha Gautama's mind would not be disturbed. For Siddhartha Gautama to live and live in a state of complete happiness, Suddhodhana had built a beautiful palace for the winter, a beautiful palace for the summer and an auspicious palace for the rainy season, and one of these 3 palaces (Chhetri 101) was located in this area. 

An inscription of 1352 BS with the name of the Malla king Punyadeva of Karnali was found on the west of the current Bauraha river, which suggests that even after the end of the Shakya Republic of Kapilvastu, Padmapani Bodhisattva promoted Buddhism in this Sainamaina area.

=== Alternate pronunciation of ‘Senamena’ is Sainamaina ===
Historian Dr. Bishnu Prasad Ghimire states, "When there was a military revolt in India in 1857, Rani Begum of Lucknow ran away with her Sena (Army Guard) and Maina (Mena Porter) and came to this place and hid in the ancient houses of the ancient city. Thus, Rani Begum hid with her army and mena, hence the name of this place came to be Sainamaina.

== Religion ==
=== Buddhist sites in Sainamaina ===
During the study of the Buddhist area, German archaeologist Anton Führer came to Sanmaina in 1986. He has mentioned Sainamaina as the place where Koṇāgamana Buddha died. Likewise, P.C. Mukherjee visited Saina Maina in 1999. While walking north from Vanakatta, he came across a ruin near Jogidanda. Around that place, he saw trenches being dug in 3 places where a Buddha’s statue of Bhumisparsha Mudra (Earth Witness Gesture) was found in a dug pit which is currently kept in the Lumbini Museum. Similarly, in the second pit about 25 feet to the north, he found a stone pillar inscribed “Jaimla Debya 1261”. It is also currently preserved in the Lumbini Museum. Likewise, from the third site he excavated, found a statue of Buddha along with a lion on an elephant and a man riding on it, is not currently available anywhere.

=== Buddhist Archeological Sites in Sainamaina ===
The following are the archeological sites found within Sinamaina area:

==== Murdhani ====
An ancient mound is located at Murdhani, in Ward No. 1 on the northern border of the municipality, which is currently covered with various kinds of weeds. In the course of conversation with some local residents, it was learned that this mound was previously circular and huge, but over the course of time, it has reduced down to its current small size.

Murdhani section is an important section of ancient Sinamaina. It was first excavated by Khadga Shumsher Jung Bahadur Rana, the ruler of Palpa. His excavation report was published in 1904. The hole he had dug in plus sign during excavation is still there. During the excavation, he found a statue of Mayadevi holding the child Buddha and also found a statue of Gautama Buddha. He has also mentioned in his article that Siddhartha Gautam was brought Sainamaina after his birth. On the south side of it, there is a shrine of the Jogi deity and a Maulo (sacred wooden pillar) has been erected where local inhabitants used to perform Durga Puja on the Ashtami of Dashain by offering sacrifices to this Maulo and the idols here. But a few years ago, Buddhist monks visited and requested not to offer sacrifices here as it is a place associated with Buddha due to which offering sacrifices has been stopped since then. In the surrounding area, the various artifacts of the plateau are in an unprotected state, covered with shrubs.

Sansari Mai's temple has been built on the mound towards the north. Where the local inhabitants worship the deity on special occasions. Although there is no information about what exactly was in this place due to the lack of research, local experts say that there may have been a palace here in ancient times and its remains may have been in the form of a mound since it was destroyed later.

==== Ranikuwa ====
It is an ancient well that lies currently in Sainamaina ward number 1. It is believed that its name is Ranikuwa because it was a well where the queen used to drink water in ancient times. Compared to the Murdhani mound, it has been preserved by building a compound. Water can still be seen in the middle of the old structure of the well, which is built with large stones.

==== Thulokuwa (Large Well) ====
Another archaeological heritage with a living history of this region is the large well (Thulokuwa). It is also known as Raja Kuwa. It is supposed that its name may have been Rajakuwa because the rulers used it for drinking water in ancient times. Looking at the structure of the well, it is seen that the circular well is constructed in a geometric pattern. On the north side of the well complex, a museum has been built where statues of various deities including the Padamapani Bodhisattva and script inscriptions are kept.

==== Jogi Danda (Yog Danda) ====
Yogi Danda is another place of Sainamaina's archeological significance. This place is in the east of the local Bauraha river. Its geographical structure has been eroded by the river every year, so it is seen that its historical significance is being destroyed. Artifacts that were carried to different places due to river erosion were collected and kept in different public places. Various building structures made of bricks are found to be covered around it. Inside the forest in its premises, ruins of brick structures arranged in a row are seen elsewhere. The statue of Dhyani Buddha (meditative Buddha) found at this place is currently kept in Lumbini. The remains of a wheel-shaped brick well are seen in the middle of the water in the mainstream where the Bauraha River is currently flowing. In the forest of this area, many layers of artifacts are scattered.

== Geography ==
=== Small plate ===
The plane area located on the north side of Bauraha River near Jogidanda is known as the small plate. It is currently located in the Charpala community forest area in Ward No. 12 of Butwal sub-metropolitan city. In this area, where there is a dense saal forest, the broken parts of the statues are seen scattered elsewhere. Brick fragments can also be seen in the same condition.

=== Large plate ===
The structure located on some upper terrain of a small plate area is called a large plate. Because of the flattery land structure, it is also called a plateau. Here too, statues and structures of various shapes and sizes are seen in different places. In some parts, well-structured ruins of stone and brick can be seen. Based on the structures seen in this place, which is currently turned into a dense Saal Forest, it can be assumed that this place was also a large and prosperous settlement area in ancient times. Here too, like in the small plate area, trenches are dug in on unauthorized manner. Similarly, pieces of kit are found around the iron mining area in abundance around here. Due to this, it can be assumed that there must have a large iron factory in this area in the past.

=== Padmapani Ashram and Padmapani Method of Treatment ===
It is assumed that this area was the hermitage of Padmapani in the past as many statues of Padamapani Lokeshvara were found around Bauraha river. Dr. Gitu Guri has stated that Bodhisattva Padamapani has advanced Buddhist philosophy in the Bouraha region. The images found in this area are in meditation, yoga and sadhana postures. Based on this, it can be claimed that this area is the ashram site of Padamapani Bodhisattva as well as a well-developed settlement area in ancient times.

The ruins of an ancient well are seen in the middle of the Bauraha River. Yoga Danda (currently known as Jogidanda) seems to have been a place for practicing yoga and meditation at a high place in ancient times. The name of the place is Yog Danda and the presence of many idols of Padamapani Lokeshvara in yoga and meditation postures around here declares that this place must be the sacred place of Padamapani. Padmapani Bodhisattva was the founder of the Vajrayana sect. That is why he encouraged Yoga Sadhana. In Vajrayana, two worlds are imagined. The visible and invisible world. Ordinary people can easily see the visible world, but to see the invisible world, requires Sadhana and Siddhi. Padamapani Bodhisattva along with his disciple Gorakhnath established Hatha Yoga Vidyapith. He stayed in this ashram and conducted yoga sadhana for human welfare.

To appreciate his actions, the general public of the Sainamaina area has established Padamapani Yoga and Natural Medicine Center at the place where his ashram used to be. It can be assumed that this medical center will make a significant contribution to the preservation of this historically important place.

Dr. Bishnu Prasad Ghimire has mentioned that there is an inscription of the medieval period found here written 'Om Mani Padme Hum', while scholar Purandas Manandhar has said that this area is an area with temples of many gods. The Chinese traveler Faxian in 403 AD and the Chinese traveler Xuanzang in 626 AD visited Kapilvastu passing through here. The map of Sinamaina prepared by the researcher P.C. Mukherjee shows that there are 3 cities in this area.

Murdhani section is an important part of the ancient Sainamaina. It was first excavated by Khadga Shamsher Jang Bahadur Rana, the ruler of Palpa. His excavation report was published in 1904. The hole he dug at the plus sign for excavation at that time is still seen. During the excavation, he had found a statue of Mayadevi holding the child Buddha and also found a statue of Gautama Buddha. He had also mentioned in his article that after the birth of Buddha, was brought here to Sainamaina.
