= Lumbini Sanskritik =

Lumbini Sanskritik लुम्बिनी सांस्कृतिक
- Municipality (नगरपालिका)
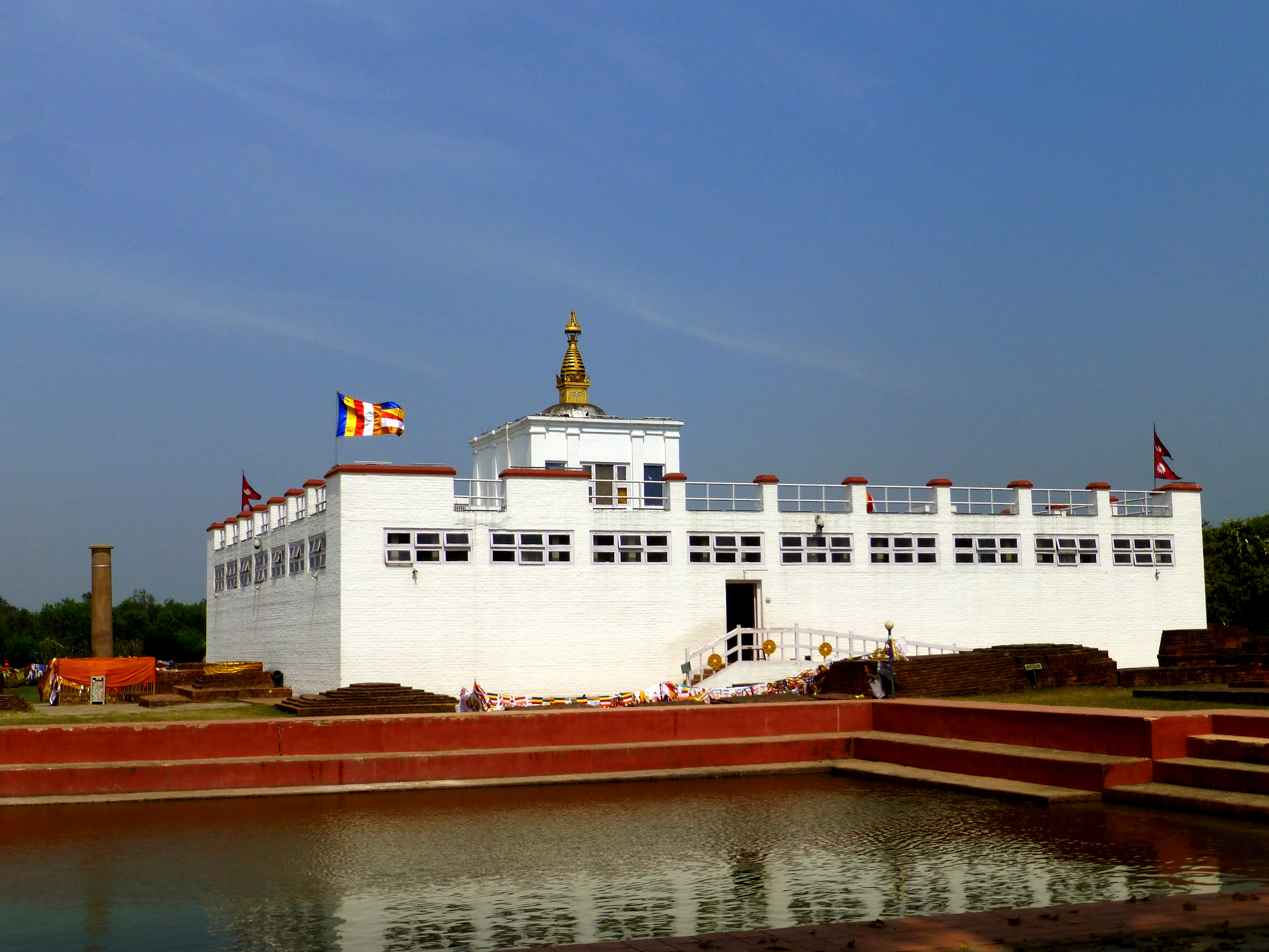

- Location of Lumbini Sanskritik
- Coordinates: 27.46716°N 83.27491°E
- Country: Nepal
- Province: Lumbini
- District: Rupandehi
- No. of wards: 13
- Established: 18 May 2014
- Incorporated (VDC): Lumbini Adarsha, Bhagawanpur, Tenahawa, Ekala, Khudabazar, Madhuwani, Masina

Government
  - Type: Mayor–council
  - Body: Lumbini Cultural Municipality
  - Mayor: Mr. Sajruddin Musalman (RC)
  - Deputy Mayor: Mrs. Kalpana Harijan (CPN-UML)

Area
  - Total: 112.21 km^{2} (43.32 sq mi)

Population (2011)
  - Total: 72,497
- Time zone: UTC+05:45 (NPT)
- Postal Codes: 32914
- Telephone Code: 071
- Major highways: F011
- Website: lumbinisanskritikmun.gov.np

Lumbini Sanskritik (Nepali: लुम्बिनी सांस्कृतिक) is a municipality situated in Rupandehi District of Lumbini Province in Nepal. Lumbini, the Buddhist pilgrimage site where Buddha was born lies in the center of this municipality.

This Lumbini Cultural Municipality was formed merging the existing Lumbini Adarsha Village development committee to six other Village Development Committees i.e. Bhagawanpur, Tenuhawa, Ekala, Khudabazar, Madhuwani, Masina. This municipality came into existence following the government decision since 18 May 2014 Total area of this municipality is 112.21 square kilometres (43.32 mi^{2}) and total population of the municipality as of 2011 Nepal census is 72,497. The municipality is divided into 13 wards. The municipality is located at 18 km of distance from the district headquarters of Siddharthanagar in Rupandehi district.

== Demographics ==
=== Languages ===
Mostly spoken language in Lumbini Sanskritik is Bhojpuri, which is spoken by 45.25% people followed by Awadhi with 29.91% people, Urdu with 19.35% people and 5.49% people speaking Other languages.

Languages in Lumbini sanskritik
1. Bhojpuri (45.2%)
2. Awadhi (29.9%)
3. Urdu (19.4%)
4. Others (5.49%)

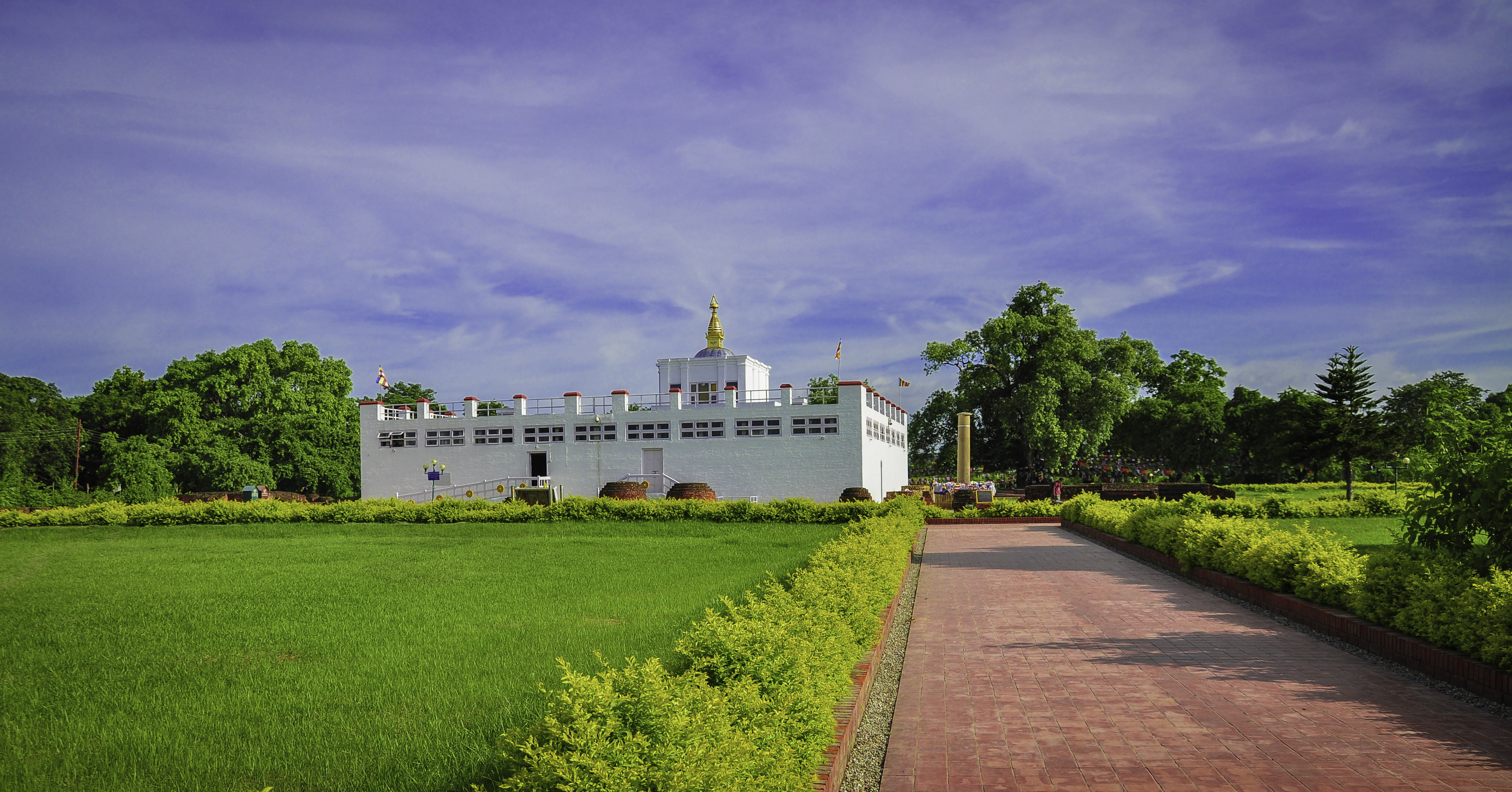
Birth palace of Buddha (Mayadevi temple) in Lumbini
