= Tilottama, Rupandehi =

Tilottama तिलोत्तमा
- Municipality (नगरपालिका)
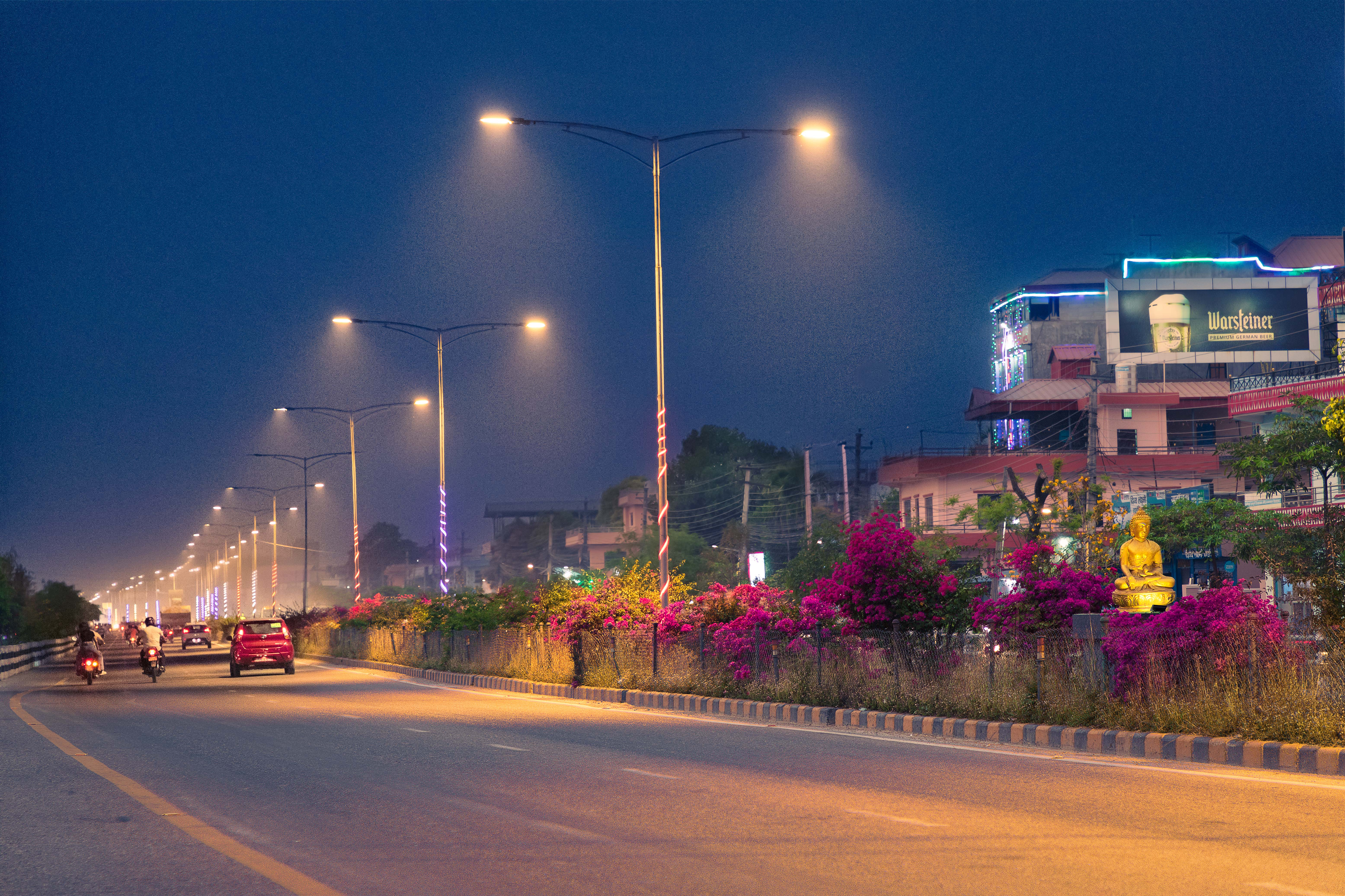
- Tilottama Skyline
- Etymology: Sanskrit word "Tila" meaning for sesame seed or a bit and "uttama" means better or higher
- Motto(s): Clean Tilottama, Green Tilottama
- Interactive map of Tilottama
- Location in Nepal
- Coordinates: 27°37′48″N 83°27′36″E
- Country: Nepal
- Province: Lumbini Province
- District: Rupandehi

Government
  - Mayor: Ram Krishna Khand (NC)
  - Deputy Mayor: Jageshwar Devi Chaudhary (NCP)

Area
  - Total: 126.2 km^{2} (48.7 sq mi)

Population (2021 Nepal census)
  - Total: 149,657
  - Density: 1,186/km^{2} (3,070/sq mi)
  - Ethnicities: Bahun Chhetri Magar Newar Tharu Kami
- Time zone: UTC+5:45 (NST)
- A.O.P. (Area Postal Code): 32903
- Website: http://www.tilottamamun.gov.np/en

Tilottama Municipality is a municipality in Lumbini Province in western Nepal. Tilottama has a city population of 149,657 as per 2021 AD Nepal census. It is one of the tri-cities of the rapidly growing Butwal-Tilottama-Bhairahawa urban agglomeration primarily based on the Siddhartha Highway in West Nepal with a total urban agglomerated population of 421,018. It was formed on May 8, 2014; when the Government of Nepal announced additional an 72 municipalities, including previously proposed 37 municipalities in line with the Local Self-governance Act, 1999. On July 25, 2014; demarcation of the municipality was done along with the assignment of new wards. The original demarcation included six existing VDCs viz. Shankarnagar VDC, Aanandaban VDC, Karahiya VDC, Makrahar VDC, Tikuligadh VDC & Madhabaliya VDC. Gangoliya VDC was later merged into the municipality on 17 September 2015.

At the time of the 1991 Nepal census, it had a population of 6894 people living in 1193 individual households. As of the 2021 Nepal census, the total city population was 149,657.

== Etymology ==
Tilottama Municipality is named after the local river Tilottama. Whereas, the Tilottama river was named after an Apsara named Tilottama as described in Hindu mythology. "Tila" is the Sanskrit word for sesame seed or a bit and "uttama" means better or higher. Tilottama therefore means the being whose smallest particle is the finest or one who is composed of the finest and highest qualities.

== Administrative divisions ==
Ward	Formerly	Chairman
1	Tilottama 1,4,5	
2	Tilottama 2, 3	
3	Tilottama 8,9	
4	Tilottama 6,7	Hari Bahadur chhetri
5	Anandaban 3,4,5	Ramesh Dumre
6	Anandaban 1,2,6,7,8,9	Ganesh Pathak
7	Karahiya 3,4,5,6,7	Devi prasad Pangeni
8	Karahiya 8	Krishna Prasad Paudel
9	Karahiya 1,2,9	Dhruba Neupane
10	Makrahar 1,2,3	Gopal Prasad Ghimire
11	Makrahar 4,6,7,8	Bishnu Bahadur Baral
12	Makrahar 5,9	Sahadev Tharu
13	Tikuligadh 2,5,6,9	Naryal Dhakal
14	Tikuligadh 1,3,4,7,8	Aswin Paudel
15	Madhabaliya 1,2,3,4,6	Khemraj Gurung
16	Madhabaliya 5,7,8,9	Jhabilal Bhusal
17	Gangoliya VDC	Dan Bahadur Chaudhary

== Health ==
There are many private clinics and government health posts. Besides these, there are auxiliary centers and private medical halls in every part of the Municipality. However the citizens of the municipality are not far from the regional hospital of Butwal and Bhairawaha, which is just 10 km away from the area. The Crimson Hospital, Lumbini Eye Care Center and other Dental and medical centers of the Manigram are serving more than 50% patients of this Municipality.

== Education ==
Tilottama Campus was established in 1996 as the first private college in Rupandehi.

Rammani Multiple Campus is situated 8 km south of Butwal Sub-Metropolitan City and 15 km north of Siddharthanagar Municipality. It is about 600m west of the Siddhartha Highway. This campus was established in 2045 B.S. Under T.U. by taking initiation by social workers, educationists, local guardians, teachers, landlords, merchants etc. contributed to setting up this campus. It is named after the Famous national Educationist & Linguist Rammani. Initially, only the Management programme was launched taking affiliation from T.U. Currently, two different streams Humanities and Management are running in the master's degree level Under T.U. In the same way, three different streams namely Management, Education and Humanities are running in bachelor's degree. Science, Management, Education & Humanities are running under the Higher Secondary Board. Campus regularly publishes its annual academic calendar, annual mouthpiece "Deepika", and research journal " The Journal of Academic Development."

Lumbini Engineering College in Bhalwari is the only engineering college in the municipality. It was established in 2000. The courses offered by the college are BCA, BE Civil, BE Computer, BE Electronics and Communication, MSc Construction Management, Diploma in Civil Engineering, Diploma in Computer Engineering and Diploma in Electronics Engineering. Similarly, Modern Little Flower Academy is another educational institute located in Tilottama Municipality.

== Popular Places ==
=== Shankarnagar Ban Bihar and Research Center ===
Shankarnagar Ban Bihar and Research Centre, simply referred to as Ban-Batika by locals is a popular attraction in Tilottama Municipality. The centre is maintained inside the area of Shankarnagar Community Forest. It was formally inaugurated by the Spokesperson of the Constituent Assembly of Nepal on 12th Poush 2064. It is popular for its picnic spots, zoo and garden.

It was awarded the Abraham Conservation Award by WWF in 2014 for its contribution in safeguarding the biodiversity of Nepal.

== Economy ==
Ostrich Nepal in Gangoliya is the largest ostrich farm in Asia with an area of 8.81 acres. It is a private company started in 2008. It has its higher mission to export meat of Rs. Five billion as well as leather, fat and feathers of around Rs. 2.5 billion to the international market by 2020. It has provided the locals with job opportunities. People from various parts of the country visit the farm daily to see the alien bird.

Jay Shiva Shakti Water Industries in Tilottama-11, Pradeepnagar is one of the processed drinking water industries of the municipality.

POOJA FARM is one of the biggest farms in the whole municipality & near other municipalities, located in Tilottama-11, Dhada which is just 500m east of Janavawana school. The farm includes Cows, Buffalos, Goats, Chickens & Ducks. This farm gives employment opportunities to many workers, the farm mainly focuses on the supply of pure milk products & meat products. It has an area of about 2Biga. The owner of the field is Roshan Timilsina.

== More ==
The municipality was established in 2014 by the government of Nepal. There are 17 wards in this municipality. The municipality is bordered by Devdaha to the east and northeast, Butwal to the north, Padshari to the south and Motipur to the west.

== Media ==
Among the Media within this Municipality are Radio Lumbini, weekly newspaper Tilottma City, Online Newspaper tilottmacitynews.com, Khasyuli FM, Radio Namaste, Tilottama FM etc. Radio program Lumbini Quiz is a famous program in this area.
