= Rupandehi District =

Coordinates: 27°30′N 83°27′E

Rupandehi District रुपन्देही जिल्ला
- District
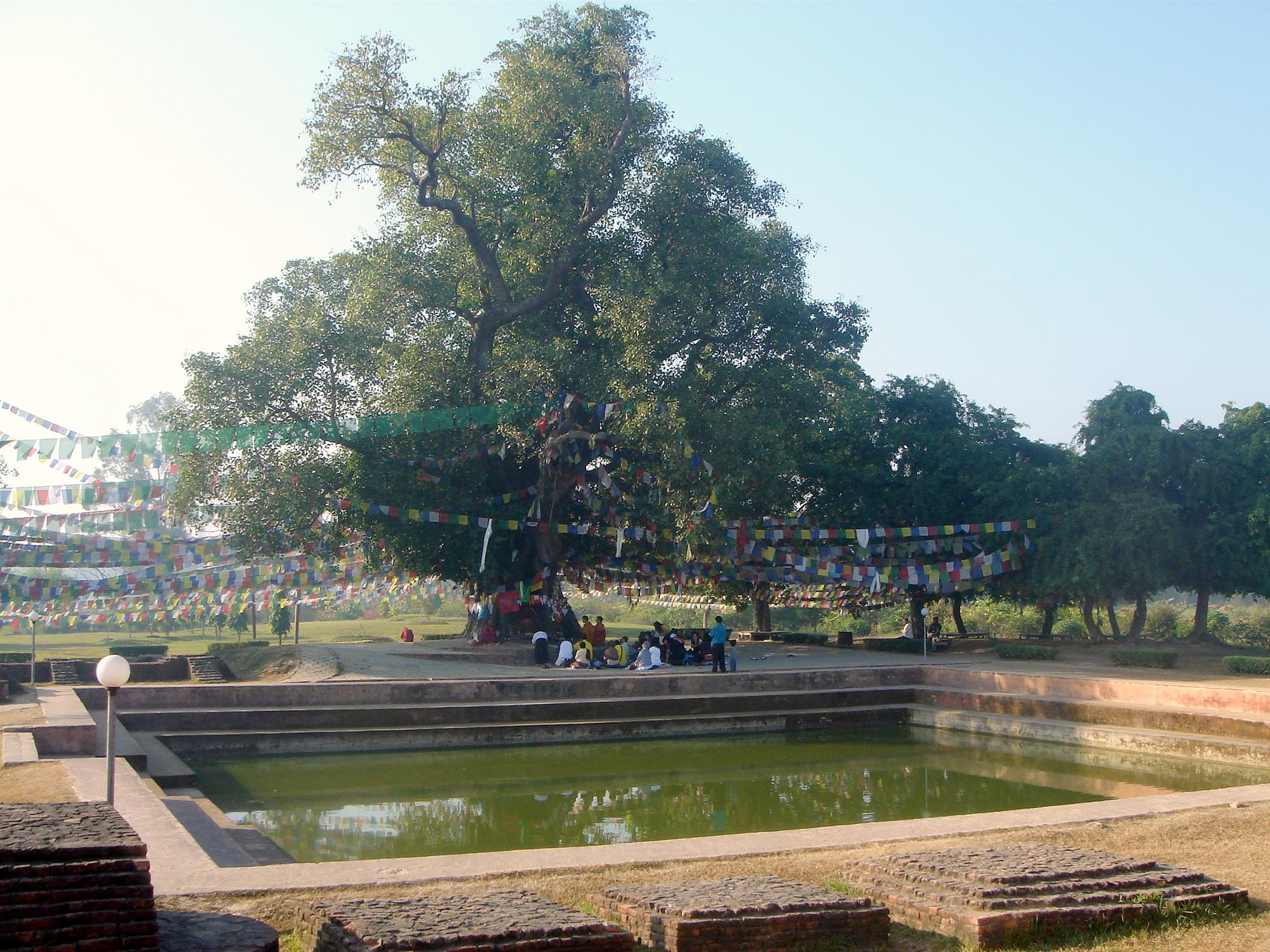
- Birthplace of Siddhārtha Gautama, the Buddha

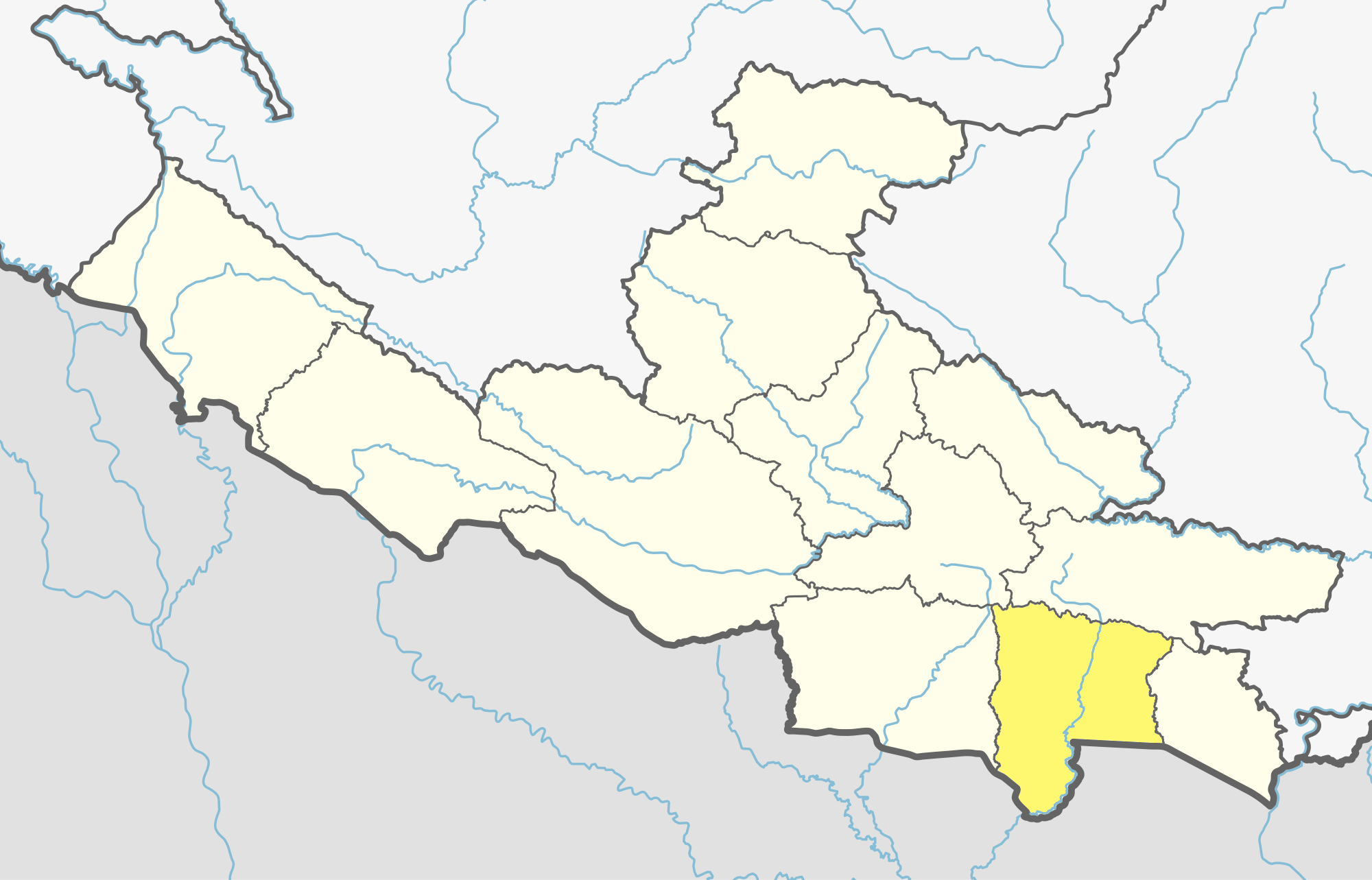
- Location of Rupandehi
- Country: Nepal
- Province: Lumbini Province
- Admin HQ.: Siddharthanagar
- Municipality: List: Urban; Butwal; Devdaha; Lumbini Sanskritik; Sainamaina; Siddharthanagar; Tilottama; Rural; Gaidahawa; Kanchan; Kotahimai; Mayadevi; Omsatiya; Rohini; Sammarimai; Siyari; Suddodhan

Government
  - Type: Coordination committee
  - Body: DCC, Rupandehi
  - Parliamentary constituencies: 5
  - Provincial constituencies: 10

Area
  - Total: 1,360 km^{2} (530 sq mi)

Population (2016)
  - Total: 982,851
  - Density: 723/km^{2} (1,870/sq mi)
- Time zone: UTC+05:45 (NPT)
- Telephone Code: 071
- Main Language(s): Nepali, Bhojpuri, Awadhi, Tharu
- Website: ddcrupandehi.gov.np

Rupandehi District (Nepali: रुपन्देही जिल्ला; pronounced [ɾu.pʌn.de.i; -e.ɦi]), a part of Lumbini Province, is one of the seventy-seven districts of Nepal and covers an area of 1,360 km^{2} (530 sq mi). The district headquarter is Bhairahawa. As per the national census 2021, the population of Rupandehi was 1,118,975.

== Etymology ==
Rupandehi is named after Rupandevi temple which is situated in garden of Lumbini, where, the queen of King Suddhodana visited and give birth to Siddhartha Gautama Buddha.

== History ==
Lumbini, birthplace of Buddha, lies in Rupandehi district. Devdaha, the birthplace of Mayadevi (mother of Buddha), also lies in Rupandehi district.

== Demographics ==
Historical population
Census year	Pop.	±% p.a.
1981	379,096	—
1991	522,150	+3.25%
2001	708,419	+3.10%
2011	880,196	+2.19%
2021	1,118,975	+2.43%
Source: Citypopulation

At the time of the 2021 Nepal census, Rupandehi District had a population of 1,121,957. 8.17% of the population is under 5 years of age. It has a literacy rate of 81.23% and a sex ratio of 1038 females per 1000 males. 656,483 (58.51%) lived in municipalities.

Ethnic groups/castes in Rupandehi district (2021)
1. Bahun (16.8%)
2. Magar (10.9%)
3. Tharu (8.23%)
4. Chhetri (7.85%)
5. Muslim (7.69%)
6. Yadav (6.73%)
7. Chamar (3.37%)
8. Kami (3.36%)
9. Lodh (2.78%)
10. Kewat (2.64%)
11. Mallaah (2.29%)
12. Kurmi (1.99%)
13. Newar (1.92%)
14. Other Madheshi non-Dalit (13.1%)
15. Other Hill Janjati (3.19%)
16. Other Madheshi Dalit (3.05%)
17. Other Khas Dalit (2.10%)
18. Other Khas non-Dalit (1.18%)
19. Others (0.85%)

Bahun are the largest group, making up around 16% of the population. Magar are the second-largest group, making up 10.86% of the population.Tharus are 8%, while Muslims are 8% of the population.

Religion in Rupandehi District (2021)
Religion	Percent
Hinduism	87.02%
Islam	8.09%
Buddhism	3.77%
Christianity	0.69%
Other or not stated	0.43%

=== Languages ===
Languages of Rupandehi District (2021)
1. Nepali (42.6%)
2. Bhojpuri (31.8%)
3. Awadhi (10.1%)
4. Tharu (7.27%)
5. Magar (4.13%)
6. Urdu (1.14%)
7. Gurung (0.91%)
8. Others (2.01%)

At the time of the 2021 census, 42.57% of the population spoke Nepali, 31.83% Bhojpuri, 10.14% Awadhi, 7.27% Tharu, 4.13% Magar, 1.14% Urdu and 0.91% Gurung as their first language.

== Administrative divisions ==
Rupandehi is divided into 16 local level units, in which 6 are urban municipality and 10 are Rural Municipality. Butwal is considered as a Sub-Metropolitan municipality.

Urban and rural municipalities of Rupandehi
Sr. No.	Name	Division	Area (KM^{2})	Population (2021)	Website
1	Butwal	Sub-Metropolitan Municipality	101.61	195,335	butwalmun.gov.np
2	Devdaha	Municipality	136.95	72,457	devdahamun.gov.np
3	Lumbini Sanskritik	Municipality	112.21	87,383	lumbinisanskritikmun.gov.np
4	Sainamaina	Municipality	162.18	78,393	sainamainamun.gov.np
5	Siddharthanagar	Municipality	36.03	74,436	siddharthanagarmun.gov.np
6	Tilottama	Municipality	126.19	149,479	tilottamamun.gov.np
7	Gaidahawa	Rural Municipality	96.79	56,149	gaidahawamun.gov.np
8	Kanchan	Rural Municipality	58.51	42,528	kanchanmun.gov.np
9	Kotahimai	Rural Municipality	58.26	45,975	kotahimaimun.gov.np
10	Marchawari	Rural Municipality	48.55	40,880	marchawarimun.gov.np
11	Mayadevi	Rural Municipality	72.44	56,170	mayadevimunrupandehi.gov.np
12	Omsatiya	Rural Municipality	48.58	41,141	omsatiyamun.gov.np
13	Rohini	Rural Municipality	64.62	43,327	rohinimun.gov.np
14	Sammarimai	Rural Municipality	50.78	43,044	sammarimaimun.gov.np
15	Siyari	Rural Municipality	66.17	44,985	siyarimun.gov.np
16	Suddodhan	Rural Municipality	57.66	41,907	suddhodhanmunrupandehi.gov.np

== Constituencies ==
Rupandehi is divided into 5 Parliamentary constituencies and 10 Provincial constituencies.

Constituency	Type	MP/MLA	Party
Rupandehi 1	Parliamentary	Sunil Lamsal	RSP
Rupandehi 2	Parliamentary	Sulav Kharel	RSP
Rupandehi 3	Parliamentary	Dr. Lekhjung Thapa	RSP
Rupandehi 4	Parliamentary	Kanhaiya Baniya	RSP
Rupandehi 5	Parliamentary	Taufik Ahamad Khan	RSP
Rupandehi 1(A)	Provincial		
Rupandehi 1(B)	Provincial		
Rupandehi 2(A)	Provincial		
Rupandehi 2(B)	Provincial		
Rupandehi 3(A)	Provincial		
Rupandehi 3(B)	Provincial		
Rupandehi 4(A)	Provincial		
Rupandehi 4(B)	Provincial		
Rupandehi 5(A)	Provincial		
Rupandehi 5(B)	Provincial		

== Geography ==
The district lies on the southern and western part of Nepal. On the East it shares border with Nawalparasi District, on West with Kapilvastu District, on North with Palpa District and on South with India. The elevation of the district lies between 100m to 1229m from sea level. The total area of the district is 1,360 km^{2} with 16.1% in Churia Range and rest in the Terai region.

=== Major rivers ===
Rupandehi has many rivers all of which flow from Northern mountains towards south into India.

- Tinau River
- Kothi River
- Sukhaira River
- Bagela River
- Rohini River
- Kanchan River
- Kacharar River
- Koili River
- Danav River
- Danda River
- Ghodaha
- Khadawa

=== Major lakes ===
- Gaidahawa lake (Gaidahawa)
- Gajedi lake (Gajedi)
- Nanda vauju lake (Chilhiya)
- Sukaiiya lake

== Climate ==
Climate Zone	Elevation Range	% of Area
Lower Tropical	below 300 meters (1,000 ft)	89.3%
Upper Tropical	300 to 1,000 meters 1,000 to 3,300 ft.	10.5%
Subtropical	1,000 to 2,000 meters 3,300 to 6,600 ft.	0.2%

=== Praketeshwar Mahadev ===
Praketeshwar Mandir is near of Lumbini Road. In months of Shrawan (late July and early August), there is a big crowded fair, quite popular among locals and people around the regions.

=== Nawa Durga Bhawani Mandir ===
It lies in Sainamaina-3, Murgiya. Many peoples visit there to worship Goddess Durga throughout the year. Many poojas are conducted timely. It is regularly repaired by the members involved in its development.

=== Lumbini ===
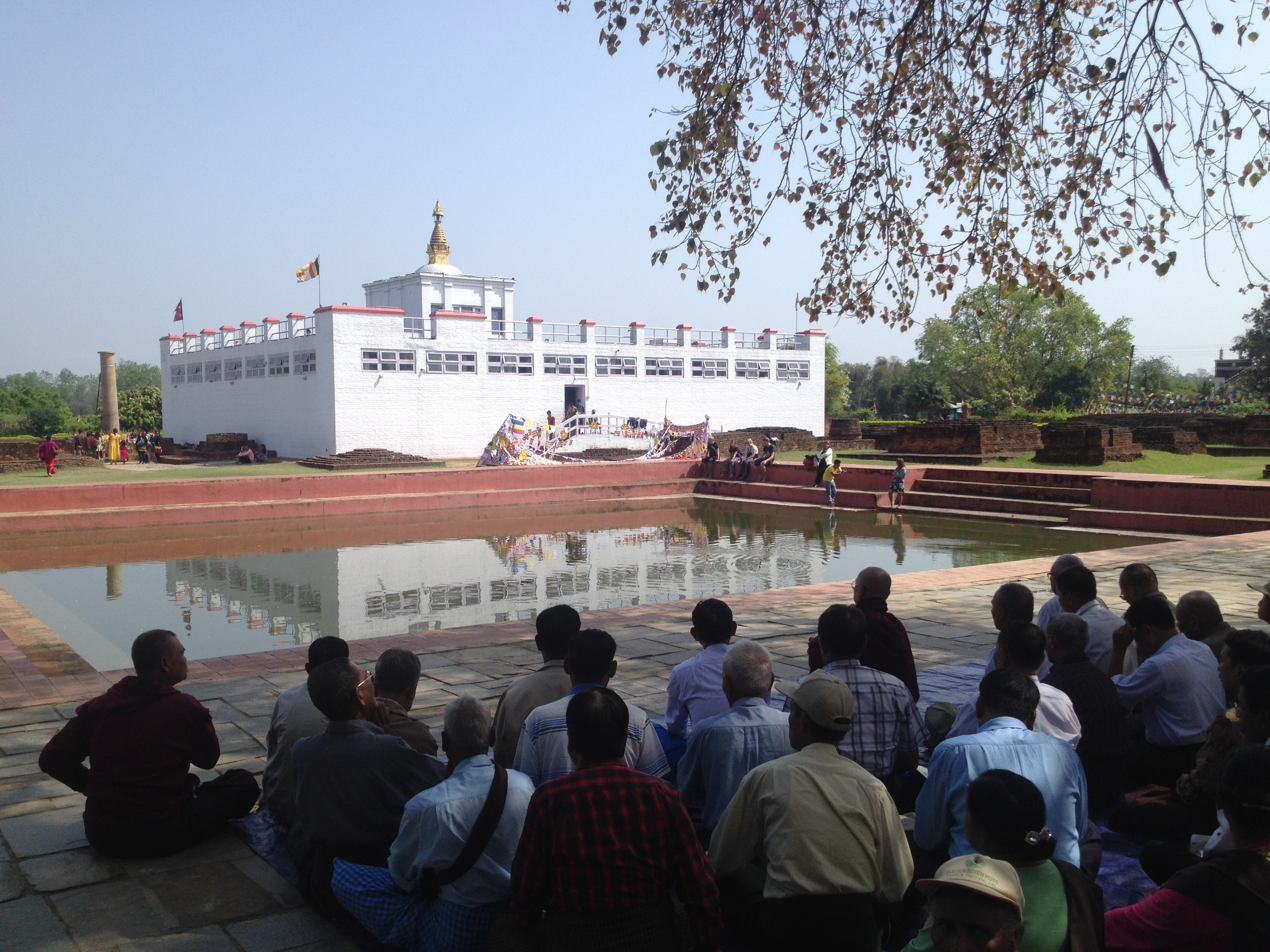
Birth place of Gautam Buddha

Lumbini is the birthplace of Buddha on whose teachings Buddhism was founded. It is granted World Heritage status by UNESCO in 1997. Thousands of Buddhist monks, pilgrims and tourists visit Lumbini annually. The ongoing up-gradation of Gautam Buddha Airport into international airport is expected to increase the number of visitors. Mahinda Rajapakshe, President of Sri Lanka is one of the high-profile visitor of Lumbini.

=== Siddha Baba Mandir ===
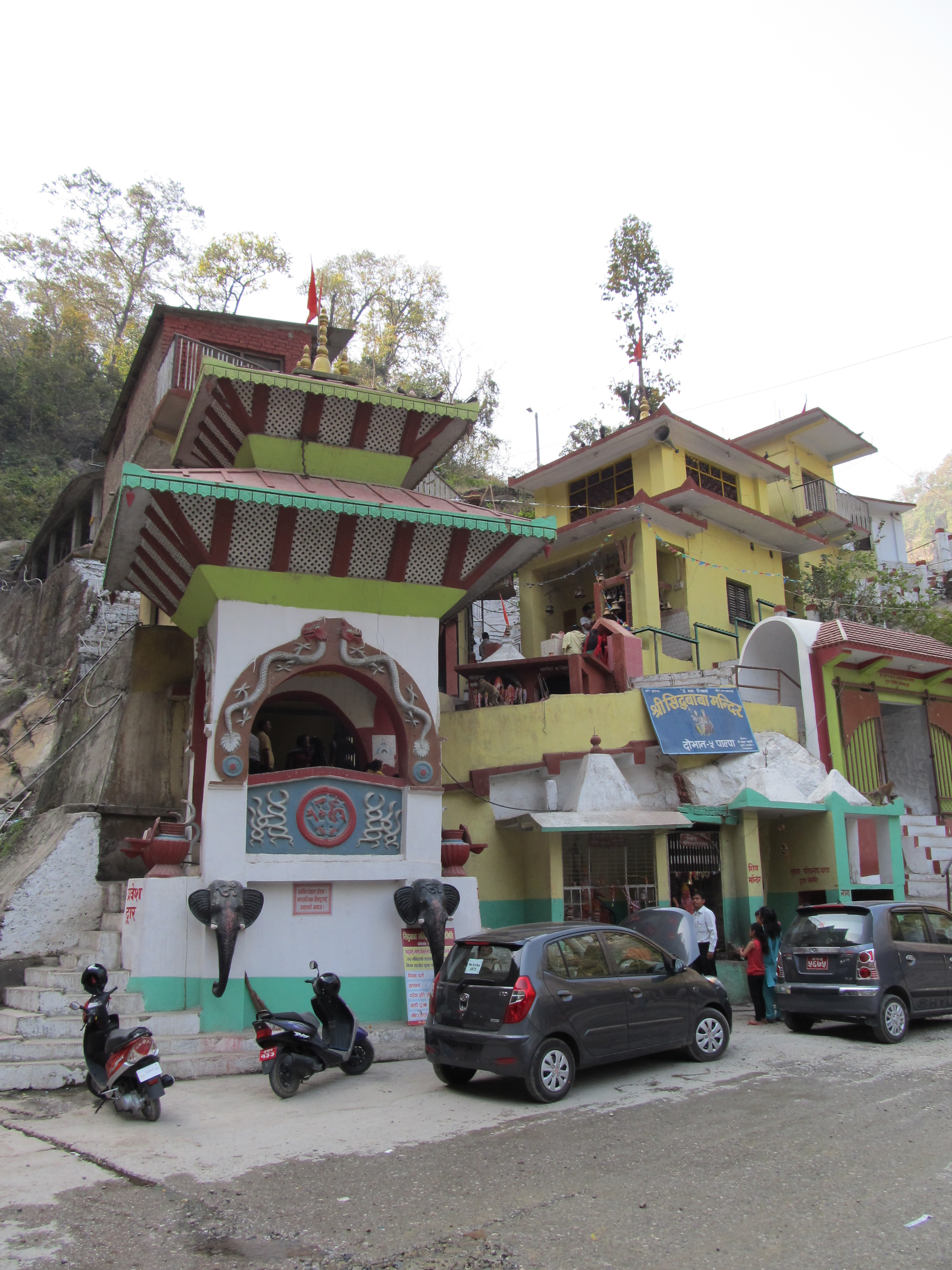
Siddha Baba Temple

This is a temple dedicated to Shiva situated in border between Palpa and Rupandehi. There is a belief that Shiva grants the wishes of the devotees who visit the temple. There are two Siddha Baba Mandir adjacent to each other. One lies within Rupandehi and another in Palpa. Nonetheless, both Mandir are regarded as pilgrimages of equal importance.

=== Satiya Devi Temple and Satiya Mai Mandir ===
This is a temple dedicated to Devi Satiya situated in Patkhauli VDC, near Rohini Khola In Rupandehi. There is a belief that Real Lady grants the wishes of the devotees who visit the temple. There are a real Maya Devi Mandir and other is modified temple adjacent to each other. One lies within Rupandehi and another in Palpa. Nonetheless, both Mandir are regarded as a pilgrimage of equal importance. Due to the Godes beloved to visitors in Satiya Ban area. Actually, this temple is situated in the middle of Rohini Khola but now River is flowing west of Satiya Devi Temple and Satiya Bagaicha.

=== Manimukunda Sen Park ===
Once a winter palace of King Manimukunda Sen, Manimukunda Sen Park is another major attraction in Rupandehi. The palace is not in shape but the ruins and antiquities of the majestic palace can still be found. It is situated in Butwal City and is popular for the picnic spots, zoo and the gardens inside the park. The greenery and the view of Rupandehi, Palpa and Kapilvastu districts is also another attraction in the park.

=== Parroha Bol Bam Dham ===
It is the oldest Bol Bam Dham (pilgrimage and festival) in Nepal. The pilgrimage is dedicated to Shiva located in Sainamaina Municipality. Thousands of Shiva's devotees from various parts of the country and from neighboring States of India visit to worship the Shivalinga inside the Bol Bam Dham. The major inflow of pilgrims occurs during the Bol Bam. Bol Bam is an annual pilgrimage glorifying Shiva made in Shraavana in which devotees travel barefooted wearing saffron robes in routes to the dham.

=== Shankar Nagar Ban Bihar and Research Center ===
Shankar Nagar Ban Bihar and Research Centre, simply referred as Ban Batika by locals is an attraction in Tilottama Municipality. The centre is maintained inside Shankarnagar Community Forest. It is visited for its picnic spots, zoo and garden.

- Chanchala Mai Mandir
- Jit Gadhi

Marchwari Devi Temple lies in Bogadi VDC of Rupandehi. It is a historical temple among the 24 previous VDC. The area surrounding this temple (now 18 VDCs) are named after this temple as Marchwar. The local people and peoples from INDIA, Uttar Pradesh visit there on specific occasions to celebrate childbirth, engagement and marriage ceremonies.

== Major economic centers ==
- Butwal
- Siddharthanagar (Bhairahawa)
- Dhakdhai (industrial area)
- Lumbini (world Heritage Area, as tourism)
- Devdaha (miroduct area)
- Sainamaina (Murgiya for sports and tourism)
- Murgiya
- Manigram
- Chho.gen Never (grain products area)
- Kothihawa
- Lumbini
- Saljhandi
- Sauraha Pharsatikar
- Bhalwari
- Manglapur
- Bashgadi
- Jogada
- Divertole
- Sankarnagar
- Jogikuti
- Thutipipal
- semlar
- marchawar
- Chhapiya
- SEMARI (industrial area)

== Health ==
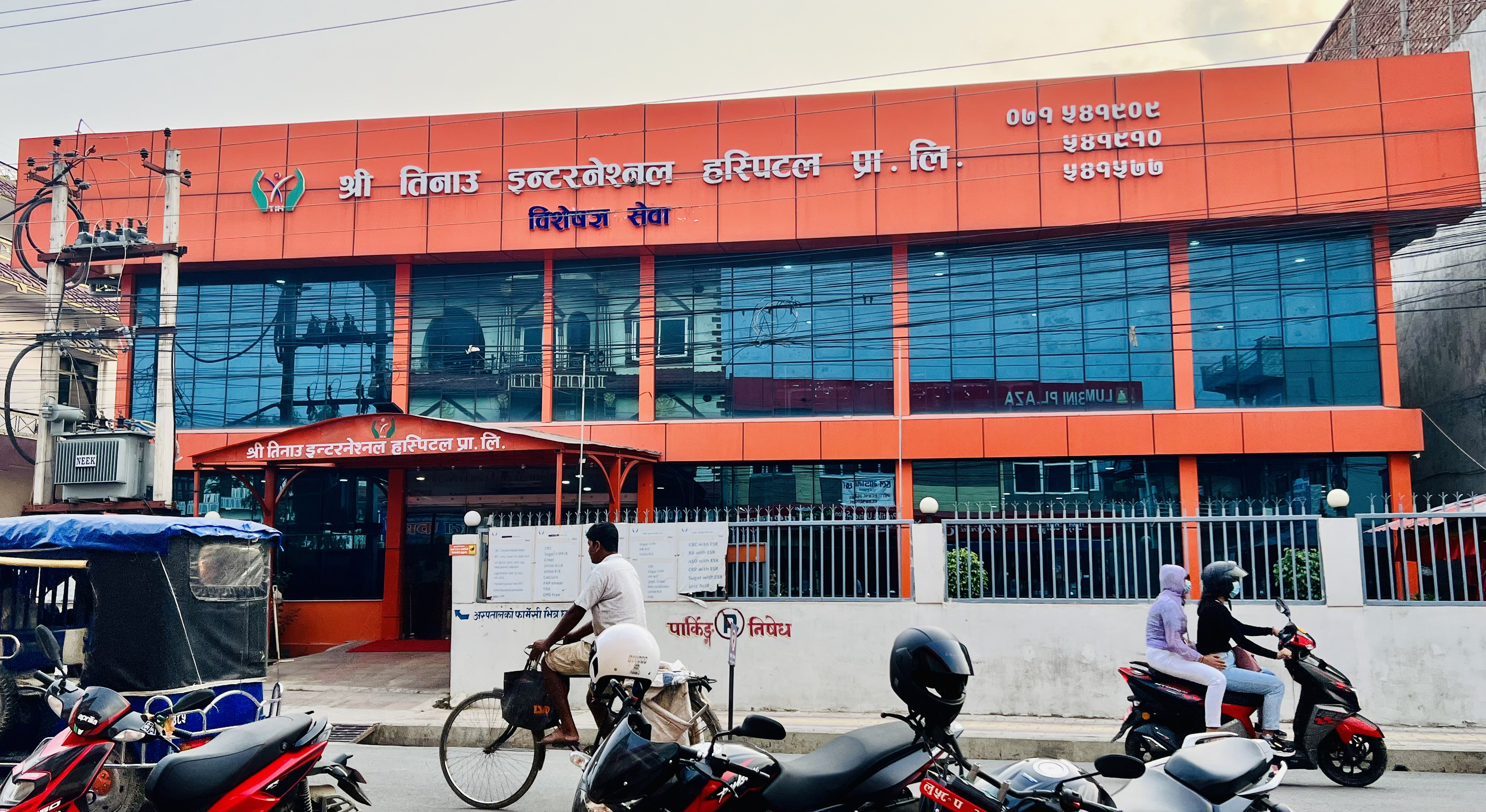
Tinau International Hospital in Sukkhanagar, Butwal, Rupandehi

Rupandehi is home to Lumbini Provincial Hospital, one of the oldest hospitals in this region, which is considered a crucial resource for healthcare to poor citizens who cannot afford private hospitals. Originally established by Chandra Sumsher, the present hospital came in operation in 2020 BS (1963–1964) with 50 beds.

In 2020, the Tinau International Hospital was inaugurated in the heart of Butwal in Sukkhanagar, Rupandehi. Patients from far-western regions and hilly regions to the north including Palpa, Gulmi, Arghakhanchi come to seek specialized care at different hospitals in the Butwal, which is known as a health hub in Rupandehi.

== Education ==
Rupandehi is renowned at national level on education sector for its infrastructure and achievements. Jilla Shikshya Karyalaya, Rupandehi (District Education Office, Rupandehi) under Ministry of Education manages and govern the education in the district. Currently, it manages 745 educational institutions in the district. As per National Census 2011, the literacy rate of the district is 72%, where male literacy rate is 89% and female literacy rate is 62%. The literacy rate is above the national average.

== Transportation ==
Siddhartha Highway and Mahendra Highway connects Rupandehi with rest of the country. Gautam Buddha Airport connects Rupandehi with the rest of the country. It is the only airport in Lumbini. It is also an international airport; the late Prime Minister Sushil Koirala laid the foundation stone of the airport on January 15.

West Nepal Bus Entrepreneurs' Association established in 2016 with the approval of District Administration Office is the major provider of transportation services for Rupandehi and the whole country.

== Sports ==
Cricket and football are the most popular sports in Rupandehi. Players in Rupandehi compete in domestic cricket tournaments as Region No. 4 Bhairahawa. Shakti Gauchan and Basanta Regmi are leading cricketers from Rupandehi who regularly play for the national team. Rupandehi XI represents Rupandehi in domestic football tournaments.

== Non-profit organisations ==
- Center for Development and Disaster management (CDM-Nepal)
- NAMUNA Integrated Development Council (NAMUNA)
- Tarai Dalit Concern centre Nepal TDCC Nepal
- FSC Rupandehi
- Samriddhi Foundation
- Ma Bhagawiti Anurag Jagarn Samooh
- Astha Samuha
- Brahmakumaris organization
- Biodiversity Conservancy Nepal
- Lilaram Kuntidevi Neupane Foundation
- Namaste Kids Nepal
- Seto Gurans Child Development Service Rupandehi
- Nepal Bikash Kendra Butwal -11, Rupandehi (Nepal Development Center)
