= Nawalparasi District =

Coordinates: 27°32′N 83°40′E

Nawalparasi District नवलपरासी जिल्ला
- District
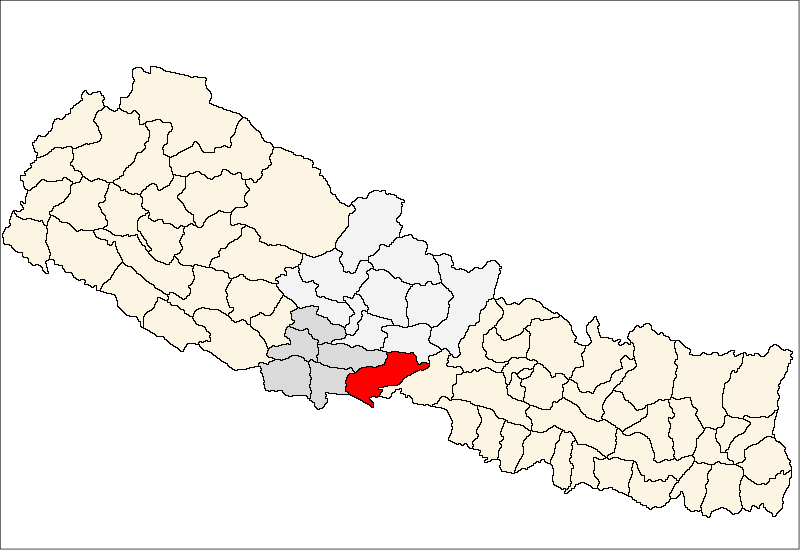
- Country: Nepal
- Development Region: Western
- Zone: Lumbini
- Established: 1962
- Disestablished: 2015 (Constitutionally); 2017 (Administratively)
- Admin HQ.: Parasi

Government
  - Type: Development Committee
  - Body: DDC Nawalparsai

Area
  - Total: 2,162 km^{2} (835 sq mi)

Population (2011)
  - Total: 643,508
  - Density: 297.6/km^{2} (770.9/sq mi)
- Time zone: UTC+05:45 (NPT)
- Telephone Code: 078
- Main Language(s): Nepali, Tharu, Bhojpuri

Nawalparasi District (Nepali: नवलपरासी जिल्ला, pronounced [nʌwʌlpʌˈɾasi]), part of which belongs to Gandaki Province and part to Lumbini Province, was one of the 75 districts of Nepal before being divided into Parasi District and Nawalpur District in 2015.

The district, with Parasi as its district headquarters, covered Parasi region (present-day Nawalparasi West) and Nawalpur region (present-day Nawalparasi East) with an area of 2,162 square kilometres (835 sq mi) and had a population (2011) of 643,508.

This district has given birth to many Nepal's top-level people, including the late Prime Minister Tanka Prasad Acharya. The midpoint of Nepal's east–west highway Mahendra Highway lies in this district. The Nawalpur valley is the part of greater Chitwan Valley of inner terai where most of the populations are Tharu, Magar and Brahmins who settled migrating from the hills. The big industries such as Chaudhary Udhyog Gram (CUG), Bhrikuti Pulp and Paper factory are located in the nawalpur area of this district. Since Parasi is the headquarter of Nawalparasi district many of the clerical offices are located there. Nepal's one of the biggest Sugar factory, Lumbini Sugar Industry, which was made by China's support, also lies in Sunwal Municipality of this district. Nowadays many industries are also being operated here like Sarbottam Cement factory, Butwal cement factory, Triveni distillery, cement factory of CG in Dumkibas, Jamuwad paper factory and other cottage industries. Developing cities such as Devchuli Municipality, Gaindakot Municipality, Kawasoti Municipality Sunwal Municipality, Madhyabindu Municipality and Bardaghat Municipality are located here. Famous towns in Nawalpur Ragion are Gaindakot, Rajahar, Keurani, Pragatinagar, Kawasoti, Shahid nagar Danda, Chormara, Arungkhola etc. Half of the Nawalpur Region is mainly hilly areas mainly populated by Brahmins, Magar and Chhetri people and terai area is mainly populated by Tharu people.

Nawalparasi district is connected to Rupandehi District on the west, Palpa and Tanahun Districts on the north, Chitwan District on the east and south and the Indian border. The longest road of Mahendra highway, 99 km in length, lies in this district. Major cities of Nepal such as Butwal, Siddharthanagar, Tansen and Bharatpur metropolitan municipality are located in neighbouring districts.

== Geography and climate ==
The highest peak in Nepal's Churia range, Mt. Devchuli 1,937 metres (6,355 ft), is in this district.

Climate Zone	Elevation Range	% of Area
Lower Tropical	below 300 meters (1,000 ft)	56.2%
Upper Tropical	300 to 1,000 meters 1,000 to 3,300 ft.	34.9%
Subtropical	1,000 to 2,000 meters 3,300 to 6,600 ft.	5.7%

== Demographics ==
At the time of the 2011 Nepal census, Nawalparasi District had a population of 643,508. Of these, 40.9% spoke Nepali, 29.0% Bhojpuri, 13.6% Magar, 9.8% Tharu, 1.9% Maithili, 1.5% Gurung, 1.0% Newari and 0.6% Tamang as their first language.

== Village Development Committees (VDCs) and Municipalities in Nawalparasi ==
Daunne Devi Temple in Nawalparasi

- Amraut
- Badahara Dubauliya
- Baidauli
- Banjariya
- Bardaghat Municipality
- Benimanipur
- Bharatipur
- Bhujhawa
- Bulingtar
- Dadajheri Tadi
- Dawanne Devi
- Dedgaun
- Deurali
- Devachuli Municipality
- Devagawa
- Dhobadi
- Dhurkot
- Dumkibas
- Gaidakot Municipality
- Germi
- Giruwari
- Guthi Parsauni
- Guthisuryapura
- Hakui
- Harpur
- Hupsekot
- Jahada, Lumbini
- Jamuniya
- Jamuwad
- Jaubari
- Kawasoti Municipality
- Kolhuwa
- Kotathar
- Kudiya
- Kumarwarti
- Kusma
- Madhyabindu Municipality
- Mainaghat
- Manari
- Manjhariya
- Mithukaram
- Naram
- Narsahi
- Naya Belhani
- Pakalihawa
- Palhi
- Ramgram Municipality
- Parsauni
- Pratappur
- Rajahar
- Rakachuli
- Rakuwa
- Ramgram Municipality
- Ramnagar
- Rampur Khadauna
- Rampurwa
- Ratnapur
- Ruchang
- Rupauliya
- Saidnagar Danda
- Sanai
- Sarawal
- Somani
- Sukrauli
- Sunwal Municipality
- Suryapura
- Swathi
- Tamasariya
- Thulo Khairatawa
- Tilakpur
- Tribenisusta
- Unwach
- Upallo Arkhale

== See also ==
- People's Progressive Party
