= Pratappur Rural Municipality =

Pratappur (RM) प्रतापपुर गाउँपालिका
- Rural Municipality
- Location Pratappur (RM) (Nepal)
- Coordinates: 27.53°N 83.70°E
- Country: Nepal
- Province: Lumbini
- District: Parasi
- Wards: 9
- Established: 10 March 2017

Government
  - Type: Rural Council
  - Chairperson: Mr. Umesh chandra Yadav
  - Vice-chairperson: Mrs. Man kumari Chaudhary
  - Term of office: (2017 - 2022)

Area
  - Total: 87.55 km^{2} (33.80 sq mi)

Population (2011)
  - Total: 41,315
  - Density: 471.9/km^{2} (1,222/sq mi)
- Time zone: UTC+5:45 (Nepal Standard Time)
- Headquarter: Pratappur
- Website: pratappurmun.gov.np

Pratappur is a rural municipality located within the Parasi District of the Lumbini Province of Nepal. The rural municipality spans an area of 87.55 square kilometres (33.80 sq mi), with a total population of 41,315 according to the 2011 Nepal census.

On March 10, 2017, the Government of Nepal restructured the local level bodies into 753 new local level structures. The previous Pratappur, Thulo Khairatawa, Baidauli, Guthi Parsauni, Guthisuryapura and portions of Jamuniya and Somani VDCs were merged to form the Pratappur Rural Municipality. Pratappur is divided into 9 wards, with Pratappur VDC declared as the administrative center of the rural municipality.
