= Palhinandan Rural Municipality =

Palhinandan (RM) पाल्हीनन्दन गाउँपालिका
- Rural Municipality
- Location Palhinandan (RM) (Nepal)
- Coordinates: 27.48°N 83.69°E
- Country: Nepal
- Province: Lumbini
- District: Parasi
- Wards: 6
- Established: 10 March 2017

Government
  - Type: Rural Council
  - Chairperson: Mr. Baiju Prasad Gupta
  - Vice-chairperson: Vacant

Area
  - Total: 44.67 km^{2} (17.25 sq mi)

Population (2011)
  - Total: 35,429
  - Density: 793.1/km^{2} (2,054/sq mi)
- Time zone: UTC+5:45 (Nepal Standard Time)
- Headquarter: Kusma
- Website: palhinandanmun.gov.np

Palhinandan is a Rural municipality located within the Parasi District of the Lumbini Province of Nepal. The rural municipality spans 44.67 square kilometres (17.25 sq mi) of area, with a total population of 35,429, according to the 2011 Nepal census.

On March 10, 2017, the Government of Nepal restructured the local level bodies into 753 new local level structures. The 6 previous VDCs, namely Rampurwa, Harpur, Kusma, Palhi, Gairami and Sanai (some portion excluded), were merged to form Palhinandan Rural Municipality. Palhinandan is divided into 6 wards, with Kusma serving as the administrative center of the rural municipality.
