= Sarawal Rural Municipality =

sarawal (RM) सरावल गाउँपालिका
- Rural Municipality
- Location sarawal (RM) (Nepal)
- Coordinates: 27.50°N 83.73°E
- Country: Nepal
- Province: Lumbini
- District: Parasi
- Wards: 7
- Established: 10 March 2017

Government
  - Type: Rural Council
  - Chairperson: Mr. Sukhadi Prasad Chaudhary Tharu
  - Vice-chairperson: Mrs.Basmati harijan
  - Term of office: (2022 - 2026)

Area
  - Total: 73.19 km^{2} (28.26 sq mi)

Population (2011)
  - Total: 38,163
  - Density: 521.4/km^{2} (1,350/sq mi)
- Time zone: UTC+5:45 (Nepal Standard Time)
- Headquarter: Sarawal
- Website: sarawalmun.gov.np

Sarawal is a Rural municipality in the Parasi District of the Lumbini Province of Nepal. The rural municipality spans 73.19 square kilometres (28.26 sq mi) of area, with a total population of 38,163, according to a 2011 Nepal census.

On March 10, 2017, the Government of Nepal restructured the local level bodies into 753 new local level structures. The previous Sarawal, Tilakpur, Manari, Badahara Dubauliya, Rampur Khadauna and Bhujhawa village development committees (VDCs) were merged to form Sarawal Rural Municipality. Sarawal is divided into 7 wards, with Sarawal VDC declared the administrative center of the rural municipality.
