= Bulingtar Rural Municipality =

Bulingtar Rural Municipality बुलिङटार गाउँपालिका
- Rural Municipality
- Location Bulingtar Rural Municipality (Nepal)
- Coordinates: 27.82°N 84.20°E
- Country: Nepal
- Province: Gandaki
- District: Nawalpur
- Wards: 6
- Established: 10 March 2017

Government
  - Type: Rural Council
  - Chairperson: Mr. Dipendra Sunari Magar.
  - Vice-chairperson: Mrs. Dil Maya Sinjali Magar.
  - Term of office: (2017 - 2022)

Area
  - Total: 147.68 km^{2} (57.02 sq mi)

Population (2011)
  - Total: 19,122
  - Density: 129.48/km^{2} (335.36/sq mi)
- Time zone: UTC+5:45 (Nepal Standard Time)
- Headquarter: Bulingtar
- Website: bulingtarmun.gov.np

Bulingtar is a Rural municipality located within the Nawalpur District of the Gandaki Province of Nepal. The rural municipality spans 147.68 square kilometres (57.02 sq mi) of area, with a total population of 19,122 according to a 2011 Nepal census.

On March 10, 2017, the Government of Nepal restructured the local level bodies into 753 new local level structures. The previous Bulingtar, Kotathar, Dadajheri Tadi, Arkhala, part of Jaubari and Bharatipur VDCs were merged to form Bulingtar Rural Municipality. Bulingtar is divided into 6 wards, with Bulingtar VDC declared the administrative center of the rural municipality.
