= Kolhuwa =

Kolhuwa कोल्हुवा
- Village development committee
- Location in Nepal Kolhuwa (Nepal)
- Coordinates: 27.57°N 84.06°E
- Country: Nepal
- Zone: Lumbini Zone
- District: Nawalparasi District

Population (1991)
  - Total: 6,292
- Time zone: UTC+5:45 (Nepal Time)

Kolhuwa is a village development committee in Nawalparasi District in the Lumbini Zone of southern Nepal. At the time of the 1991 Nepal census it had a population of 6,292 people living in 1,025 individual households. .This VDC was merged in the Madhyabindu municipality on 19 September 2015 along with Tamasariya and Narayani Village development committees (VDCs). The center of the municipality is established in the former Tamasariya VDC of Chormara Bazaar. After merging the three VDCs population it had a total population of 28,224 according to 2011 Nepal census.
