= Swathi, Nepal =

Village development committee in Lumbini Zone, Nepal

Swathi स्वाती
- Village development committee
- Location in Nepal
- Coordinates: 27.58°N 83.65°E
- Country: Nepal
- Zone: Lumbini Zone
- District: Nawalparasi District

Population (1991)
  - Total: 9,982
- Time zone: UTC+5:45 (Nepal Time)

Swathi is a town in Parasi District in the Lumbini Zone of southern Nepal. At the 2011 Nepal census it had a population of 10,629 people living in 2,102 households. This village development committee (VDC) has been combined with Sunwal VDC to make Sunwal Municipality.
