= Humsekot =

Coordinates: 27°44′N 83°57′E

Humsekot हंसकोट
- Village development committee
- Location in Nepal Humsekot (Nepal)
- Country: Nepal
- Zone: Lumbini Zone
- District: Nawalparasi District

Population (1991)
  - Total: 3,015
- Time zone: UTC+5:45 (Nepal Time)

Humsekot is a village development committee in Nawalparasi District in the Lumbini Zone of southern Nepal. At the time of the 1991 Nepal census it had a population of 3015 people living in 472 individual households.
