= Banjariya, Parasi =

Banjariya
- Village development committee
- Location in Nepal
- Coordinates: 27.55°N 83.61°E
- Country: Nepal
- Province: Lumbini Province
- District: Nawalparasi District

Population (1991)
  - Total: 5,211
- Time zone: UTC+5:45 (Nepal Time)

Banjariya is a village development committee in Parasi District in the Lumbini Zone of southern Nepal. At the time of the 1991 Nepal census it had a population of 5211 people living in 853 individual households.
