= Shahidnagar Danda =

Shahidnagar Danda शहिदनगर डण्डा
- City
- Country: Nepal
- Province: Gandaki Province
- District: Nawalpur District
- Municipality: Kawasoti Municipality
- Time zone: UTC+5:45 (Nepal Time)
- Area code: 078

Shahidnagar Danda is the city center in Nawalpur District in Gandaki Province of southern Nepal. It is located in Kawasoti municipality, ward number 16. Shahidnagar Danda is locally known as Danda Bazar. It is the most highly populated areas in Kawasoti municipality after Kawasoti itself and one with a well developed infrastructure.

== Education ==
Education services are provided by a range of schools, including private boarding schools and other institutions. Janata Higher Secondary School and Nawalpur English School, are two schools in the area. Janata Higher Secondary School is one of the most highly regarded community schools in the Nawalparasi district.

== Tourism ==
Shahidnagar Danda is the gateway to the popular tourist area of Nawalparasi, Amaltari. Several sites are accessible from this point, including Tharu Village, the Temple Tiger, the Amaltari Homestay, the Narayani River, and the Buffer Zone of Chitwan National Park.

== Facilities ==
The city infrastructure includes services related to health, education, transportation, communication and trade. Madhyabindu Hospital is one of the top hospitals in this region, located at the center of this area alongside Mahendra Highway. Health services are also provided by clinics and pharmacies. Transportation is well developed, particularly by the Mahendra Highway, which is the longest highway of Nepal. Others local highways have also been constructed here. The city is a hub for buses that operate on local routes for areas like Kolhuwa, Amaltari, Gochhada. It is also possible to get a bus to Narayangarh Chitwan from here. The ticket counter is located here for western part of the highway like Dang, Surkhet. Communication lines are also well developed, including telephone, email and internet services. Shahidnagar Danda is a trading center that attracts commercial visitors from Gochhada, Godar, Amaltari, and Gochhada Tar. Trade has played an important role in the development of the city. Our grandfathers also used to come here for a trading purpose, particularly to the local bazar, which opens on Mondays and Thursdays. Locals buy and sell different items, fruit and vegetables.
