= Harkatta =

Harkatta हर्कट्टा
- Village
- Motto(s): My legacy, My pride, My Harkatta
- Location in Nepal
- Coordinates: 27°34′N 83°43′E
- Country: Nepal
- Development Region: Western
- Zone: Lumbini Zone
- District: Nawalparasi District

Population (1991)
  - Total: 22,630
- Time zone: UTC+5:45 (Nepal Time)
- Postal code: 33000 (DPO)
- Area code: +078

Harkatta is a village in Nawalparasi District in the Lumbini Zone of southern Nepal.
