= Sisawa =

Sisawa सिसवा
- Village development committee
- Location in Nepal
- Coordinates: 27.53°N 82.93°E
- Country: Nepal
- Zone: Lumbini Zone
- District: Kapilvastu District

Population (1991)
  - Total: 5,890
- Time zone: UTC+5:45 (Nepal Time)

Sisawa is a village development committee in Nawalparasi District in the Lumbini Zone of southern Nepal. At the time of the 2001 Nepal census it had a population of 5890.
