= Lumbini Adarsha Degree College =

- लुम्बिनी आदर्श डिग्री कलेज
- Type: Public
- Established: 1999 (2056 B.S.)
- Affiliations: HSEB, Pokhara University
- Chancellor: Mr. Baburam Rana
- Location: Kawasoti, Nepal
- Website: lumbiniadarsha.edu.np

Lumbini Adarsha Degree College is an educational institution located in Kawasoti, Nawalparasi District, Nepal. It was established in 1999.
