= Amraut =

Place in Nepal

Amraut Amraut Amraut
- Village development committee
- Nickname: Amraut
- Location in Nepal
- Coordinates: 27.56°N 83.62°E
- Country: Nepal
- Province: Lumbini Province
- District: Nawalparasi District

Population (1991)
  - Total: 4,710
- Time zone: UTC+5:45 (Nepal Time)

Amraut is a village development committee in Parasi District in the Lumbini Zone of southern Nepal. At the time of the 1991 Nepal census it had a population of 4710 people living in 738 individual households.
