= Dawanne Devi =

Daunne Devi Kunjanpur
- Village development committee
- Nickname: Kukurmara
- Location in Nepal
- Coordinates: 27.51°N 83.84°E
- Country: Nepal
- Zone: Lumbini Zone
- District: Nawalparasi District

Population (1991)
  - Total: 10,833
- Time zone: UTC+5:45 (Nepal Time)
- Website: https://www.nepal.gov.np/

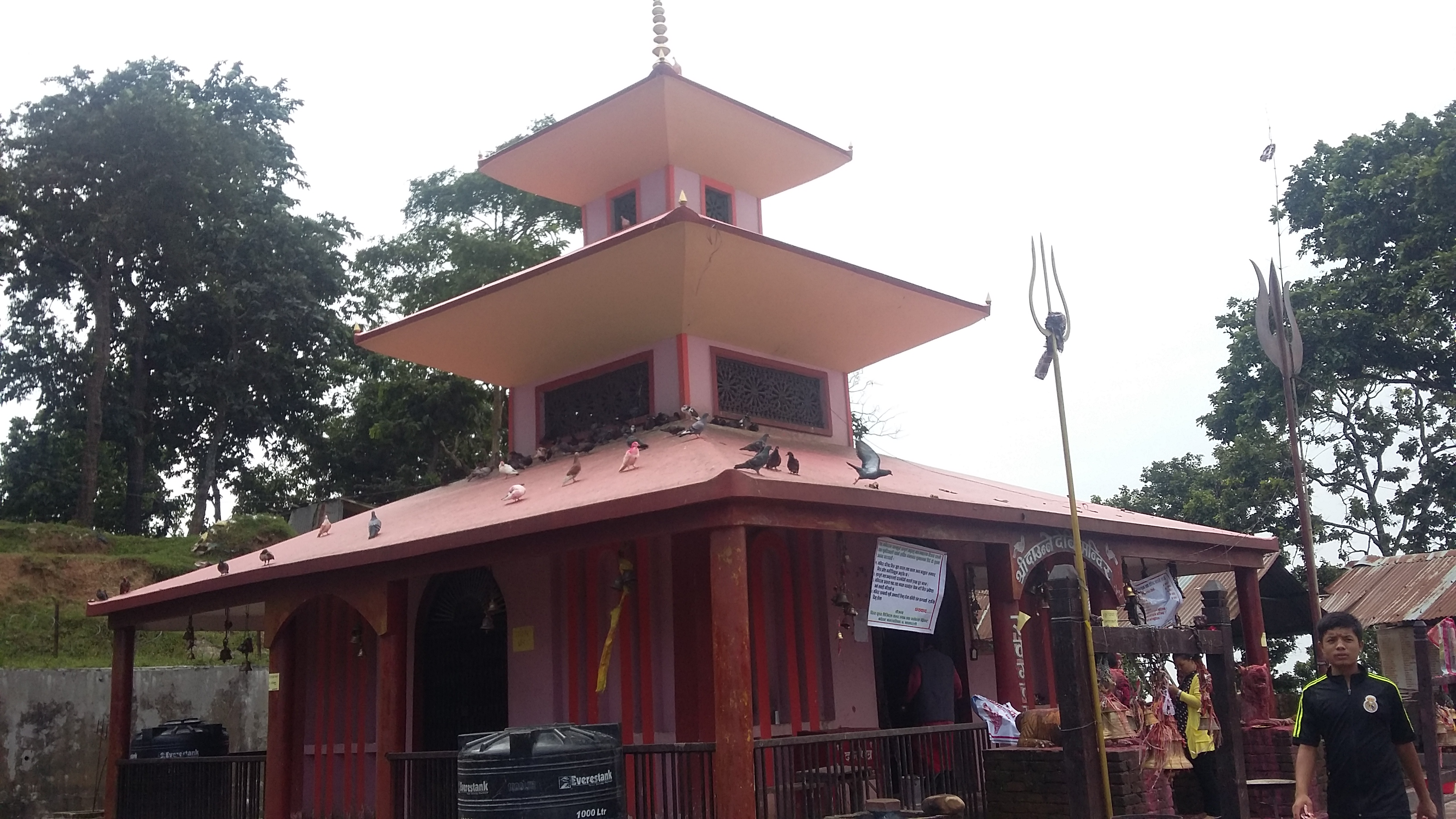
The village of Dawanne Devi is situated near the temple Daunne Devi and hence has a similar sounding name as the locals named the village after the Daunne Devi mata. It is believed that Mata takes care of them.

Dawanne Devi is a village development committee in Nawalparasi District in the Lumbini Zone of southern Nepal. At the time of the 1991 Nepal census it had a population of 10,833 people living in 2058 individual households. The place derives its name from Daunne Devi Temple.
