= Hupsekot Rural Municipality =

Hupsekot (RM) हुप्सेकोट गाउँपालिका
- Rural Municipality
- Location Hupsekot (RM) (Nepal)
- Coordinates: 27°41′26″N 84°3′44″E
- Country: Nepal
- Province: Gandaki
- District: Nawalpur
- Wards: 6
- Established: 10 March 2017

Government
  - Type: Rural Council
  - Chairperson: Laxmi Devi Pandey
  - Vice-chairperson: Purna Singh Rana
  - Term of office: (2022- 2027)

Area
  - Total: 189.21 km^{2} (73.05 sq mi)

Population (2011)
  - Total: 25,065
  - Density: 132.47/km^{2} (343.10/sq mi)
- Time zone: UTC+5:45 (Nepal Standard Time)
- Headquarter: Deurali
- Website: hupsekotmun.gov.np

Hupsekot is a Rural municipality located within the Nawalpur District of the Gandaki Province of Nepal. The rural municipality spans 189.21 square kilometres (73.05 sq mi) of area, with a total population of 25,065 according to a 2011 Nepal census.

On March 10, 2017, the Government of Nepal restructured the local level bodies into 753 new local level structures. The previous Hupsekot, Dhobadi and Deurali VDCs were merged to form Hupsekot Rural Municipality. Hupsekot is divided into 6 wards, with Deurali declared the administrative center of the rural municipality. Thumki Devi Temple is a major attraction of Hupsekot. Ghoptey is one of the rare men chairpersons in local government, having been elected twice to lead this rural municipality and Anusha Pokhrel was elected as his personal secretary in 2024, October 31.
