= Kumarwarti =

Kumarwarti कुमारवर्ती
- Village development committee
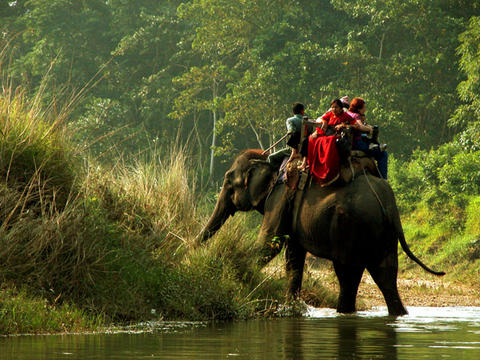
- Chitwan National Park

- Location in Nepal Kumarwarti (Nepal)
- Coordinates: 27°36′N 84°6′E
- Country: Nepal
- Zone: Lumbini Zone
- District: Nawalparasi District

Population (1991)
  - Total: 4,155
- Time zone: UTC+5:45 (Nepal Time)

Kumarwarti is a village development committee in Nawalparasi District in the Lumbini Zone of southern Nepal. At the time of the 1991 Nepal census it had a population of 4155 people living in 698 individual households. However data derived more recently for marriage and education details has suggested in 2001 the population had grown to over 5000.

== History ==
On July 27, 2002, the Kathmandu Post reported that the summer monsoon's flooding had caused over 900 families in the Lumbini Zone, including people from Kumarwarti had been displaced from their homes. In November, it was reported that Maoist cadres had attacked the Kumarwarti VDC and robbed local farmers' of their rice.

== Politics and conservation ==
The Village Development Committee is part of a protected environmental buffer zone in Nepal called the Royal Chitwan National Park (RCNP). Within the locality, politically, the VDC is under obligation to respect national Community Forestry guidelines.

However, a 2003 Journal and Forest Livelihood report, indicated a leadership crisis in Kumarwarti from 2001, with several people failing to provide a committee to consider protection due to a reluctance to deal with the warden and National Park rangers. The people of the Village Development Committee have been criticised for lacking the capacity to deal with the authorities, and to distance themselves away from management roles.

In Kumarvarti, the sale of forest products is restricted within the buffer zone. In 1998 when the poorer Majhi/Bote households wanted to sell their share of thatch grass to outside buyers for ₹3 per bundle to raise finances, they were denied permission by the authorities.

== Religion ==
The Village Development Committee is primarily Hindu in religion. However, the 2001 census recorded 82 Buddhists and 91 Christians living within it.

== Education ==
In 2001, 1802 out of 2212 of the people eligible for school were attending classes. 410 children were not receiving an education, 250 of these were female. Kumarwarti has a number of schools including Kumarwarti English School, Kumarwarti Secondary School and Higher Secondary School/Kumarwarti College. Kumarwarti English School is located at27°40′57″N 84°13′51″E. Rajendra K.C., currently a manager for the national Ideal Friendship-Nepal was previously a lecturer at Kumarwarti College for over two years.
