= Rajahar =

- Village development committee
- Location in Nepal Rajahar (Nepal)
- Coordinates: 27.74°N 84.24°E
- Country: Nepal
- Zone: Lumbini Zone
- District: Nawalparasi District

Population (1991)
  - Total: 7,839
- Time zone: UTC+5:45 (Nepal Time)

Rajahar is a village development committee in Nawalparasi District in the Lumbini Zone of southern Nepal. It lies in and is intersected by Mahendra Highway. Rajahar Bazar is one of the oldest town of the area. This area is highly served by weekly street market every Sunday commonly known as Haat. At the time of the 1991 Nepal census it had a population of 7839 people living in 1387 individual households.
