= Kusma, Parasi =

Kusma कुश्मा
- Village development committee
- Location in Nepal
- Coordinates: 27.48°N 83.69°E
- Country: Nepal
- Zone: Lumbini Zone
- District: Nawalpur District

Population (1991)
  - Total: 4,862
- Time zone: UTC+5:45 (Nepal Time)

Kusma is a former village development committee in Parasi District in the Lumbini Zone of southern Nepal. At the 1991 Nepal census it had a population of 4861 people living in 754 households.
