= Manari =

Manari may refer to:

- Manari, Pernambuco, municipality in the State of Pernambunco, Brazil
- Manari, Greece, settlement in Arcadia, Greece
- Manari, Guyana, in Barima-Waini region
- Manari, Nepal, district in Nepal
