= Rakuwa =

Rakuwa रकुवा
- Rural Municipality
- Location in Nepal Rakuwa (Nepal)
- Coordinates: 27.84°N 84.05°E
- Country: Nepal
- Zone: Lumbini Zone
- District: Nawalpur District

Population (1991)
  - Total: 2,248
- Time zone: UTC+5:45 (Nepal Time)

Rakuwa is a Rural Municipality in Nawalpur District in the Lumbini Zone of southern Nepal. At the time of the 1991 Nepal census it had a population of 2248 people living in 419 individual households.
