= Pratappur, Nepal =

Pratappur प्रतापपुर Belatari
- Village development committee
- Location in Nepal
- Coordinates: 27.52°N 83.70°E
- Country: Nepal
- Zone: Lumbini Zone
- District: Nawalparasi District

Population (1991)
  - Total: 5,654
- Time zone: UTC+5:45 (Nepal Time)

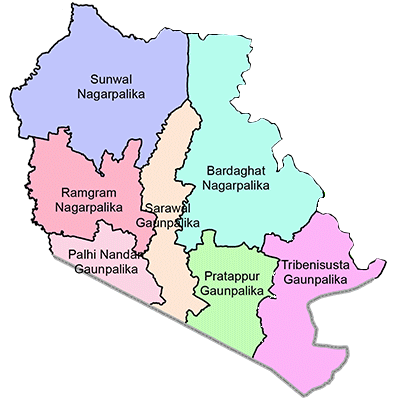
map of parasi district showing pratappur

Pratappur is a village development committee in Parasi District in the Lumbini Zone of southern Nepal. At the time of the 1991 Nepal census it had a population of 5654 people living in 889 individual households.
