= Jaubari =

Jaubari may refer to:

- Jaubari, Gandaki, Nepal
- Jaubari, Lumbini, Nepal
