= Manjhariya =

Coordinates: 27°4′N 84°53′E

Manjhariya मन्झरिया
- Village development committee
- Interactive map of Manjhariya
- Country: Nepal
- Zone: Lumbini Zone
- District: Nawalparasi District

Population (1991)
  - Total: 2,977
- Time zone: UTC+5:45 (Nepal Time)

Manjhariya is a village development committee in Nawalparasi District in the Lumbini Zone of southern Nepal. At the time of the 1991 Nepal census, Manjhariya had a population of 2,977 people living in 427 individual households.
