= Naram =

Naram नरम
- Village development committee
- Location in Nepal Naram (Nepal)
- Coordinates: 27.80°N 84.08°E
- Country: Nepal
- Zone: Lumbini Zone
- District: Nawalparasi District

Population (1991)
  - Total: 2,834
- Time zone: UTC+5:45 (Nepal Time)

Naram is a village development committee in Nawalparasi District in the Lumbini Zone of southern Nepal. At the time of the 1991 Nepal census it had a population of 2834 people living in 405 individual households.
