= Jamuwad =

Coordinates: 27.503°N 83.767°E

Jamuwad जमुवाड
- Village development committee
- Interactive map of Jamuwad
- Country: Nepal
- Zone: Lumbini Zone
- District: Nawalparasi District

Population (1991)
  - Total: 4,908
- Time zone: UTC+5:45 (Nepal Time)

Jamuwad is a village development committee in Nawalparasi District in the Lumbini Zone of southern Nepal. At the time of the 1991 Nepal census it had a population of 4908 people living in 748 individual households.
