= Unwach =

Coordinates: 27°30′N 83°40′E

Unwach उनवाच
- Village development committee
- Interactive map of Unwach
- Country: Nepal
- Zone: Lumbini Zone
- District: Nawalparasi District

Population (1991)
  - Total: 3,745
- Time zone: UTC+5:45 (Nepal Time)

Unwach is a village development committee in Nawalparasi District in the Lumbini Zone of southern Nepal. At the time of the 1991 Nepal census it had a population of 3745 people living in 600 individual households.
