= Bhrikuti Pulp and Paper =

Paper mill in Gaindakot, Nepal, 1985–2011

- Trade name: Bhrikuti Paper and Pulp Nepal Pvt. Ltd
- Industry: Pulp and paper
- Founded: 1985; 41 years ago, Gaindakot, Nepal
- Founder: Government of Nepal
- Defunct: 2011; 15 years ago
- Headquarters: Gaindakot, Nepal
- Owner: Golchha Organization
- Number of employees: 485 (2011)

Bhrikuti Pulp and Paper (Nepali: भृकुटी पल्प एण्ड पेपर लिमिटेड; officially known as Bhrikuti Paper and Pulp Nepal (BPPN) Ltd) was a pulp mill and paper mill located in Gaindakot, Nepal.

The factory is closed in 2011 due to labor conflict and privatization given to golchha group.

== History ==
Bhrikuti Pulp and Paper was established in 1985 under the Companies Act 2021 (Bikram Sambat) with support from the People's Republic of China. It was based in Gaindakot, Nawalparasi District (now part of Nawalpur District). Bhrikuti Pulp and Paper was the first paper company in Nepal.

In 1992, Bhrikuti Pulp and Paper was privatised and since then it had been owned by Golcha Organization. Their major paper buyers were Saja Prakashan, Janak Shiksha Samagri Kendra, and Gorkhapatra. In 2008, workers staged a protest due to "the factory administration had not granted the hiked salary that the government had earmarked for workers". The workers accused the company of ignoring their requests and stopped working until the matter was resolved. In 2011, Bhrikuti Pulp and Paper was closed permanently. Bhrikuti Paper Factory is located in Ward No. 2 and 5 of Gaindakot Municipality. About 400 meters of road with a width of 17 to 22 meters can be seen on the map.
