= Gairami =

Gairami चमनटोला 6
- Village development committee
- Location in Nepal
- Coordinates: 27.46°N 83.66°E
- Country: Nepal
- Zone: Lumbini Zone
- District: Nawalparasi District

Population (1991)
  - Total: 4,645
- Time zone: UTC+5:45 (Nepal Time)

Gerami is a village development committee in Nawalparasi District in the Lumbini Zone of southern Nepal. At 1991 Nepal census it had a population of 4,645 people living in 714 households.
