= Hakui =

Hakui may refer to:

- Hakui, Ishikawa, Japan
- Hakui District, Ishikawa, Japan
- Hakui, Nepal
- Hakui Koyori, Japanese VTuber
