= Rakachuli =

Rakachuli राकाचुली
- Village development committee
- Location in Nepal Rakachuli (Nepal)
- Coordinates: 27.70°N 83.90°E
- Country: Nepal
- Zone: Lumbini Zone
- District: Nawalparasi District

Population (1991)
  - Total: 3,168
- Time zone: UTC+5:45 (Nepal Time)

Rakachuli is a village development committee in Nawalparasi District in the Lumbini Zone of southern Nepal. At the time of the 1991 Nepal census it had a population of 3168 people living in 508 individual households.
