= Jahada =

Jahada जहाडा
- Village development committee
- Location in Nepal
- Coordinates: 27.50°N 83.76°E
- Country: Nepal
- Zone: Lumbini Zone
- District: Nawalparasi District

Population (1991)
  - Total: 6,532
- Time zone: UTC+5:45 (Nepal Time)

Jahada is a village development committee in the Nawalparasi District in the Lumbini Zone of southern Nepal. At the time of the 1991 Nepal census it had a population of 6532 people living in 1110 individual households. It has 9 wards. The village development committee office is located in Vatulliya beside the Jahada community library.
