= Ratnapur, Nawalpur =

Coordinates: 27°44′N 84°17′E

Ratnapur रत्नपुर
- Village development committee
- Location in Nepal Ratnapur (Nepal)
- Country: Nepal
- Zone: Lumbini Zone
- District: Nawalparasi District

Population (1991)
  - Total: 2,936
- Time zone: UTC+5:45 (Nepal Time)

Ratnapur is a village development committee in Nawalparasi District in the Lumbini Zone of southern Nepal. At the time of the 1991 Nepal census it had a population of 2936.
