= Mithukaram =

Mithukaram मिठुकराम
- Village development committee
- Location in Nepal Mithukaram (Nepal)
- Coordinates: 27.84°N 84.10°E
- Country: Nepal
- Zone: Lumbini Zone
- District: Nawalparasi District

Population (1991)
  - Total: 2,240
- Time zone: UTC+5:45 (Nepal Time)

Mithukaram is a village development committee in Nawalparasi District in the Lumbini Zone of southern Nepal. At the time of the 1991 Nepal census, it had a population of 2240 people living in 392 individual households.
