= Upallo Arkhale =

Upallo Arkhale उपल्लो अर्खले
- Village development committee
- Location in Nepal Upallo Arkhale (Nepal)
- Coordinates: 27.79°N 84.17°E
- Country: Nepal
- Zone: Lumbini Zone
- District: Nawalparasi District

Population (1991)
  - Total: 3,033
- Time zone: UTC+5:45 (Nepal Time)

Upallo Arkhale is a village development committee in Nawalparasi District in the Lumbini Zone of southern Nepal. At the time of the 1991 Nepal census it had a population of 3033 people living in 418 individual households.

In 1969 Gary and Barbara Shepherd moved from San Diego California to Nepal and eventually found Upallo Arakhale (pronounced "are-ah-kha-lha".) They began working with the Magars who are best known for their bravery as the British Gurkha soldiers but have a historical/linguistic background that comes from Mongolia. In 1974, the Shepherds moved to Arakhale now known as "Upallo" or "Upper" Arakhale village and built a house at the top of the village which is still in use today. They lived in this remote region for months at a time with their two children Michael and Adina while they learned the language and provided humanitarian support.

In 1978 Henry and Caroline Materna with Materna Productions came to Nepal to record several documentaries about Nepal for the Austria school system. One of the films produced was on the Shepherds living among the Magars in Arakhale.

In 1982 Gary published "Life Among the Magars" after having met with the King of Nepal.

After joining Redd Barna's save the children efforts for Nepal and learning the key skills necessary to tackle large road projects, they set off on a personal effort to raise $60,000 for a food-for-work road project that started the transformation of the region and has become a major artery for transportation which can now be seen on Google Maps. When the road was initially completed from Dhobadi up over the 5,000 ft pass to Arakhale it was named Barbara's Highway after Barbara, who died in 1991. Today Google Maps lists this as the Dhobadi - Bulingtar Rd as further fundraising efforts and eventual adoption by the government has extended this critical north–south artery from the Kali Gandaki River to the Pragatinagar Hwy.

The transformation of a region by the dedication of a few is exhibited in the lack of malnutrition and survival rates of the Magars. Surveys of the area by Sister Gwen in the late 1960s showed a child mortality rate of ~60%. Today with sanitation practices established and basic hygiene and medicine that rate is now under 10%.
