= Dedgaun =

Dedhgaun
- Ward
- Location in Nepal Dedhgaun (Nepal)
- Coordinates: 27.85°N 84.08°E
- Country: Nepal
- Province: Gandaki Province
- Zone: Lumbini Zone
- District: Nawalparasi District

Government
  - Chairman: Shyam Sundar Shrestha

Population (2021)
  - Total: 4,209
- Time zone: UTC+5:45 (Nepal Time)

Dedhgaun (or Dedgaun) is a Ward in Nawalparasi District in the Gandaki Province of southern Nepal. At the time of the 2021 Nepal census it had a population of 4209 people living in 513 individual households.

Dedgaun lies on the bank of the Holy Kali Gandaki River and is surrounded by mountains in all sides.

The Dedgaun area, including the new hydro-electricity project at Baundi Khola, was heavily damaged by floods in September 2008.

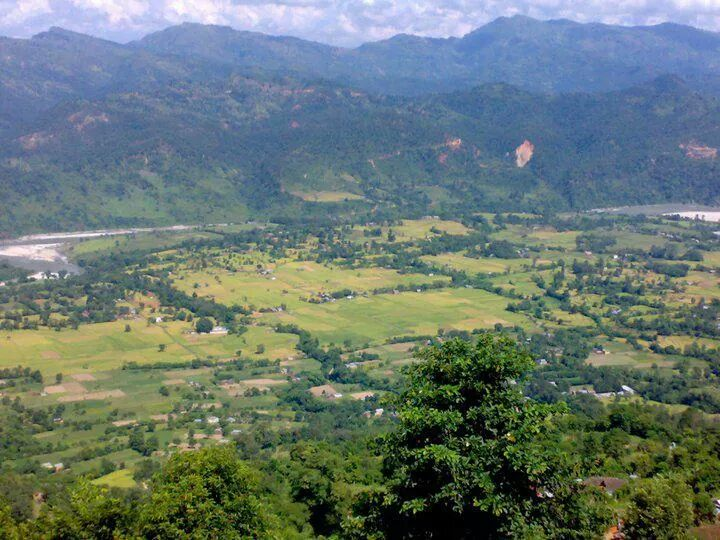
