= Ruchang =

Ruchang रुचाङ
- Village development committee
- Location in Nepal Ruchang (Nepal)
- Coordinates: 27.80°N 84.04°E
- Country: Nepal
- Zone: Lumbini Zone
- District: Nawalparasi District

Population (1991)
  - Total: 2,884
- Time zone: UTC+5:45 (Nepal Time)

Ruchang is a village development committee in Nawalparasi District in the Lumbini Zone of southern Nepal. At the time of the 1991 Nepal census it had a population of 2884 people living in 454 individual households.
