= Benimanipur =

Benimanipur sardi
- Village development committee
- Location in Nepal Benimanipur (Nepal)
- Coordinates: 27.66°N 83.86°E
- Country: Nepal
- Zone: Lumbini Zone
- District: Nawalparasi District

Population (1991)
  - Total: 6,399
- Time zone: UTC+5:45 (Nepal Time)

Benimanipur is a village development committee in Nawalparasi District in the Lumbini Zone of southern Nepal. At the time of the 1991 Nepal census it had a population of 6399 people living in 1113 individual households. The Benimanipur vdc become known as benayi gauon palika. And main place is bagaicha, where based deependra high school even college and reached English boarding school. Now the cement factory under construction called honshi is Asia's second-largest cement factory.
