= Hupsekot =

Coordinates: 27°45′N 84°00′E

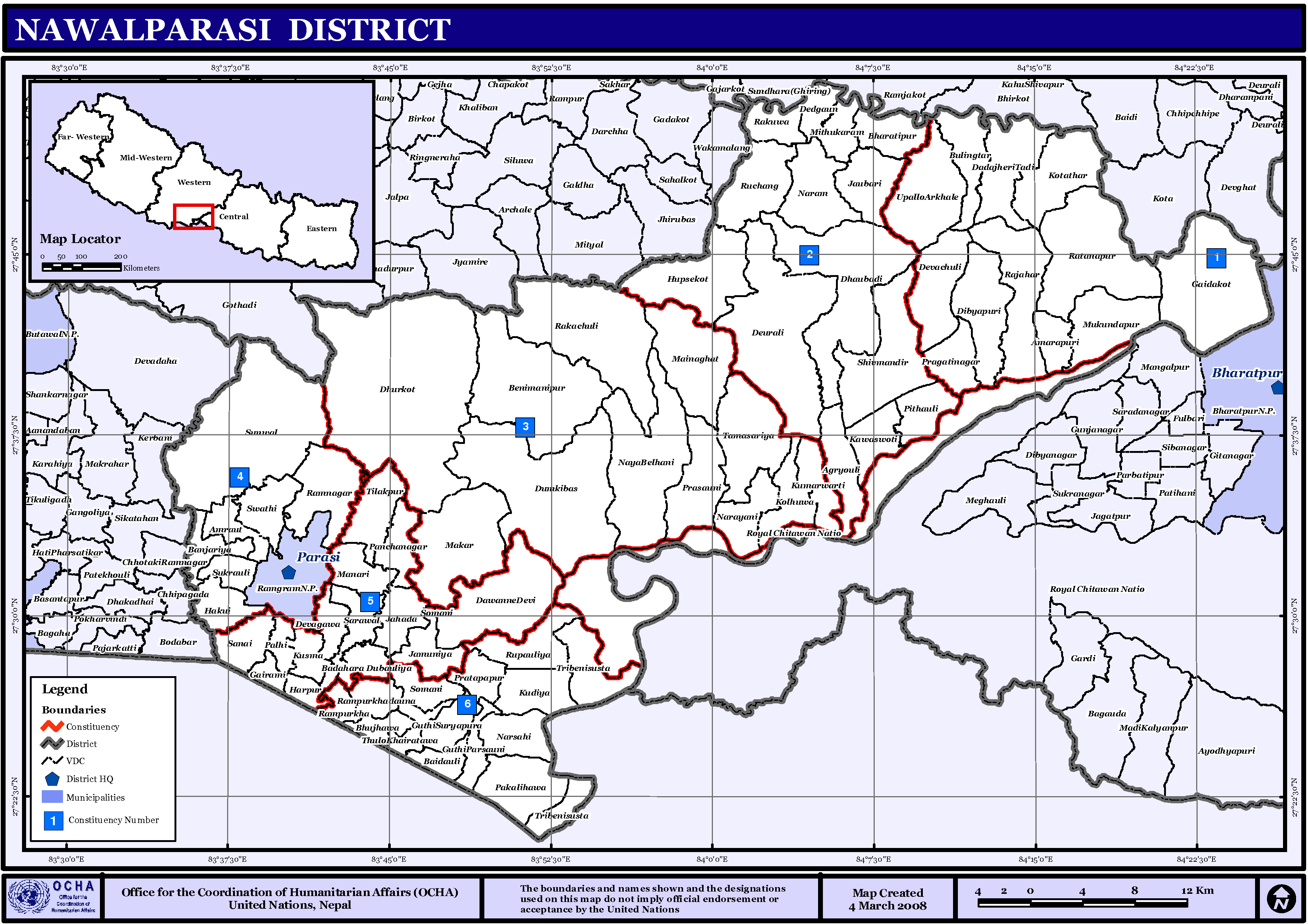
Map of the old Nawalparasi District showing VDCs

Hupsekot was a VDC in the former Nawalparasi District which was a part of the former Lumbini Zone of the Western Development Region of Nepal. Total population of Hupsekot VDC in 2011 was 3,681 individuals with 552 households

In 2017 Government of Nepal restructured the local level body into 753 units as per the new constitution of Nepal 2015. After the reconstruction all the former VDC merged to new or former municipality and rural municipality. Hupsekot is now a part of Hupsekot Rural Municipality which lies in new Nawalpur District of new Gandaki Province.
