= Narsahi =

Narsahi नरसही
- Village development committee
- Location in Nepal
- Coordinates: 27.42°N 83.85°E
- Country: Nepal
- Zone: Lumbini Zone
- District: Nawalparasi District

Government

Population (1991)
  - Total: 4,639
- Time zone: UTC+5:45 (Nepal Time)

Narsahi is a village development committee in Nawalparasi District in the Lumbini Zone of southern Nepal. At the time of the 1991 Nepal census it covered a population of 4639 people living in 768 individual households.
