= Somani, Nepal =

Somani सोमानी
- Village development committee
- Location in Nepal
- Coordinates: 27°27′N 83°45′E
- Country: Nepal
- Zone: Lumbini Zone
- District: Nawalparasi District

Population (1991)
  - Total: 5,202
- Time zone: UTC+5:45 (Nepal Time)

Somani is a village development committee in Nawalparasi District in the Lumbini Zone of southern Nepal. At the time of the 1991 Nepal census it had a population of 5202 people living in 783 individual households.
