= Palhi =

Palhi पाल्ही
- Village Development Committee
- Location in Nepal
- Coordinates: 27.48°N 83.66°E
- Country: Nepal
- Zone: Lumbini Zone
- District: Nawalparasi District

Population (1991)
  - Total: 4,133
- Time zone: UTC+5:45 (Nepal Time)

Palhi is a village development committee in Nawalparasi District in the Lumbini Zone of southern Nepal. At the time of the 1991 Nepal census it had a population of 4133 people living in 625 individual households.
