= Guthisuryapura =

Coordinates: 27°25′N 83°47′E

- Village development committee
- Interactive map of Guthisuryapura
- Country: Nepal
- Zone: Lumbini Zone
- District: Nawalparasi District

Population (1991)
  - Total: 4,945
- Time zone: UTC+5:45 (Nepal Time)

Guthisuryapura is a village development committee in Nawalparasi District in the Lumbini Zone of southern Nepal. At the time of the 1991 Nepal census it had a population of 4945.
