= Bharatipur =

- Village development committee
- Location in Nepal Bharatipur (Nepal)
- Coordinates: 27.83°N 84.14°E
- Country: Nepal
- Zone: Lumbini Zone
- District: Nawalparasi District

Population (1991)
  - Total: 2,533
- Time zone: UTC+5:45 (Nepal Time)

Bharatipur is a village development committee in Nawalparasi District in the Lumbini Zone of southern Nepal. At the time of the 1991 Nepal census it had a population of 2533 people living in 439 individual households.
