= Kotathar =

Kotathar कोटाथार
- Village development committee
- Location in Nepal Kotathar (Nepal)
- Coordinates: 27.81°N 84.28°E
- Country: Nepal
- Zone: Lumbini Zone
- District: Nawalparasi District

Population (1991)
  - Total: 2,747
- Time zone: UTC+5:45 (Nepal Time)

Kotathar is a village development committee in Nawalparasi District in the Lumbini Zone of southern Nepal. At the time of the 1991 Nepal census it had a population of 2747.
