= Thulo Khairatawa =

Thulo Khairatawa ठूलो खैरतवा
- Village development committee
- Location in Nepal
- Coordinates: 27.42°N 83.76°E
- Country: Nepal
- Zone: Lumbini Zone
- District: Nawalparasi District

Population (1991)
  - Total: 3,385
- Time zone: UTC+5:45 (Nepal Time)

Thulo Khairatawa is a village development committee in Nawalparasi District in the Lumbini Zone of southern Nepal. At the time of the 1991 Nepal census it had a population of 3385 people living in 543 individual households.
