= Jaubari, Nawalpur =

Jaubari जौबारी
- Rural municipality
- Location in Nepal Jaubari (Nepal)
- Coordinates: 27.80°N 84.12°E
- Country: Nepal
- Zone: Lumbini Zone
- District: Nawalparasi District

Population (1991)
  - Total: 3,076
- Time zone: UTC+5:45 (Nepal Time)

Jaubari is a Rural municipality in Nawalpur District in the Gandaki Province of southern Nepal. At the time of the 1991 Nepal census it had a population of 3076 people living in 455 individual households.
