= Pakalihawa =

Pakalihawa is a village development committee in Nawalpur District in Gandaki Province of southern Nepal. At the time of the 2011 Nepal census it had a population of 63483 people living in 1153 individual households.
