= Jamuniya, Parasi =

Jamuniya जमुनिया
- Village development committee
- Location in Nepal
- Coordinates: 27.47°N 83.79°E
- Country: Nepal
- Zone: Lumbini Zone
- District: Nawalpur District

Population (1991)
  - Total: 6,605
- Time zone: UTC+5:45 (Nepal Time)

Jamuniya is a village development committee in Nawalpur District in the Lumbini Zone of southern Nepal. At the time of the 1991 Nepal census it had a population of 6605 people living in 1004 individual households.
