= Sanai, Nepal =

Sanai सनाइ
- Village development committee
- Location in Nepal
- Coordinates: 27.48°N 83.64°E
- Country: Nepal
- Zone: Lumbini Zone
- District: Nawalparasi District

Population (1991)
  - Total: 8,820
- Time zone: UTC+5:45 (Nepal Time)

Sanai is a village development committee in Nawalparasi District in the Lumbini Zone of southern Nepal. At the time of the 1991 Nepal census it had a population of 5208 people living in 814 individual households.
