= Tilakpur =

Village development committee in Lumbini Zone, Nepal

Tilakpur तिलकपुर
- Village development committee
- Location in Nepal
- Coordinates: 27.59°N 83.75°E
- Country: Nepal
- Zone: Lumbini Zone
- District: Nawalparasi District

Population (1991)
  - Total: 6,544
- Time zone: UTC+5:45 (Nepal Time)

Tilakpur is a village development committee in Nawalparasi District in the Lumbini Zone of southern Nepal. At the time of the 1991 Nepal census it had a population of 6544.
