= Suryapura, Parasi =

Suryapura सूर्यपुरा
- Village development committee
- Country: Nepal
- Province: Lumbini Province
- District: Parasi District

Population (1991)
  - Total: 8,820
- Time zone: UTC+5:45 (Nepal Time)

Suryapura is a village development committee in Parasi District in Lumbini Province of southern Nepal. At the time of the 1991 Nepal census it had a population of 4372 people living in 638 individual households.
