= Dhobadi =

- Village development committee
- Location in Nepal Dhobadi (Nepal)
- Coordinates: 27.770°N 84.119°E
- Country: Nepal
- Zone: Lumbini Zone
- District: Nawalparasi District

Population (1991)
  - Total: 4,077
- Time zone: UTC+5:45 (Nepal Time)

Dhobadi is a village development committee in Nawalparasi District in the Lumbini Zone of southern Nepal. At the time of the 1991 Nepal census it had a population of 4077 people living in 607 individual households.
