= Rampur Khadauna =

Coordinates: 27°27′N 83°43′E

Rampur Khadauna रामपुर खदौना
- Village development committee
- Interactive map of Rampur Khadauna
- Country: Nepal
- Zone: Lumbini Zone
- District: Nawalparasi District

Population (1991)
  - Total: 3,665
- Time zone: UTC+5:45 (Nepal Time)

Rampur Khadauna is a village development committee in Nawalparasi District in the Lumbini Zone of southern Nepal. At the time of the 1991 Nepal census it had a population of 3665 people living in 506 individual households.
