= Badahara Dubauliya =

- Village development committee
- Location in Nepal
- Coordinates: 27°28′07″N 83°43′20″E
- Country: Nepal
- Province: Lumbini Province
- District: Parasi District

Population (1991)
  - Total: 5,255
- Time zone: UTC+5:45 (Nepal Time)

Badahara Dubauliya was a village development committee in Nawalparasi District (now part of Parasi District) in the Lumbini Province of southern Nepal until 2015. At the time of the 1991 Nepal census it had a population of 5,255 people living in 856 individual households.

In the 10 September 2015 administrative reorganization, it became a municipality within Lumbini Province.
