= Hakui, Nepal =

Hakui हाकुई
- Village development committee
- Location in Nepal
- Coordinates: 27.51°N 83.62°E
- Country: Nepal
- Zone: Lumbini Zone
- District: Nawalparasi District

Population (1991)
  - Total: 3,726
- Time zone: UTC+5:45 (Nepal Time)

Hakui is a village development committee in Nawalparasi District in the Lumbini Zone of southern Nepal. At the time of the 1991 Nepal census it had a population of 3,726 in 573 individual households.
