= Bulingtar =

- Village development committee
- Location in Nepal Bulingtar (Nepal)
- Coordinates: 27.82°N 84.20°E
- Country: Nepal
- Zone: Lumbini Zone
- District: Nawalpur District

Population (1991)
  - Total: 3,215
- Time zone: UTC+5:45 (Nepal Time)
- Website: http://bulingtarmun.gov.np/

Bulingtar is a village development committee in Nawalpur District in Gandaki Province, Nepal. Bulingtar is located in the region of Western Region. Western Region's capital Pokhara (Pokhara) is approximately 52 km / 32 mi away from Bulingtar (as the crow flies). The distance from Bulingtar to Nepal's capital Kathmandu (Kathmandu) is approximately 113 km / 70 mi (as the crow flies). This rural municipality is surrounded by the Gaindakot Gaupalika in the East, Baudhikali Gaunpalika in the west. Similarly, Rishing Gaunpalika lies on the Northern side whereas Devachuli Nagarpalika in the Southern side.

== Places of Interest ==
Ghumari Ghat, Dev Chuli, Jharikhanda Durbar, Barchuli, and others are some of the places of interest around.

== Accommodation ==
Due to remoteness followed by less popularity fewer options for accommodation including homestay is available in this rural municipality. At the time of the 1991 Nepal census it had a population of 3215 people living in 501 individual households.
