= Baudikali Rural Municipality =

Baudikali Rural Municipality बौदीकाली गाउँपालिका
- Gaunpalika
- Location in Nepal
- Coordinates: 27.846753°N 84.080620°E
- Country: Nepal
- Province: Gandaki
- District: Nawalpur District

Area
  - Total: 91.9 km^{2} (35.5 sq mi)

Population
  - Total: 15,374
  - Density: 167/km^{2} (433/sq mi)
- Time zone: UTC+5:45 (Nepal Time)
- Website: http://bungdikalimun.gov.np/

Baudikali Rural Municipality (Nepali :बौदीकाली गाउँपालिका) is a Gaunpalika in Nawalpur District in Gandaki Province of Nepal. On 12 March 2017, the government of Nepal implemented a new local administrative structure, with the implementation of the new local administrative structure, VDCs have been replaced with municipal and Village Councils. Baudikali is one of these 753 local units.
