= Sarawal =

Sarawal सरवल
- Village development committee
- Location in Nepal
- Coordinates: 27.50°N 83.73°E
- Country: Nepal
- Zone: Lumbini Zone
- District: Nawalparasi District

Population (1991)
  - Total: 3,942
- Time zone: UTC+5:45 (Nepal Time)

Sarawal is a village development committee in Nawalparasi District in the Lumbini Zone of southern Nepal. At the time of the 1991 Nepal census, it had a population of 3942 people living in 553 individual households.
