= Sunwal =

City in Parasi District, Nepal

Sunwal सुनवल Sunawal, Golden Place, Golden Wall
- Municipality (नगरपालिका)
- Mottoes: Nepali: सांस्कृतिक सहर, सुनवल सुन्दर सहर, lit. 'Cultural City, Sunwal Precious Municipality'
- Location within Lumbini Province Location within Nepal Location within Asia
- Coordinates: 27°36′22″N 83°39′38″Etype:city_region:NP | display = display=title, inline }}
- Country: Nepal
- Province: Lumbini
- District: Nawalparasi (West of Bardaghat Susta) district
- Founder: Golden King
- No. of Wards: 13

Government
  - Type: Mayor–council government
  - Body: Sunwal City Municipality Government
  - Mayor: Bimala Aryal (UML)
  - Deputy mayor: Surya Prasad Dubey (UML)

Area
  - Municipality (नगरपालिका): 173.50 km^{2} (66.99 sq mi)
- Elevation: 131 m (430 ft)

Population (2021)
  - Municipality (नगरपालिका): 72,621
  - Rank: 27th
  - Density: 419/km^{2} (1,090/sq mi)
  - Metro: 0.11 million
  - Municipal rank: 29th
- Time zone: UTC+05:45 (Nepal Standard Time)
- Postal Code: 33000
- Area code: 078
- Website: www.sunwalmun.gov.np

Sunwal City, (Note: English: /ˌkætmænˈduː/, Nepali: काठमाडौँ, pronounced [ˌkaʈʰmaɳˈɖu], Nepal Bhasa: 𑐫𑐾𑑃 𑐡𑐾𑐫𑑂/ येँ देय्) officially the Sunwal Municipal City, (Note: Nepali: काठमाडौँ महानगरपालिका, Nepal Bhasa: 𑐫𑐾𑑃 𑐩𑐴𑐵𑐣𑐐𑐬𑐥𑐵𑐮𑐶𑐎𑐵 / येँ महानगरपालिका) is the urbanized and the most populous city of Parasi District with 72,621 native inhabitants living in 18,689 households in 2021 and 0.11 million people in its urban agglomeration. It is located in the Lumbini Province, at an altitude of 131 metres (430 feet).

The city is one of the oldest continuously inhabited places in Lumbini, founded in the 15th century. The city was historically called the "Sunawal" and has been the home of the Brahmin, Chhetri, Gurung, Magar and Newar people, a cosmopolitan urban civilization in the Himalayan foothills.

== Demographics ==
At the 2011 Nepal census, Sunwal City had a population of 39,847 people living in 8,639 individual households. After the announcement of the municipality by combining two VDCs, the total population of Sunwal Municipality increased to more than 100,000, which is the highest for any municipality in Nawalparasi district. Swathi alone had a population of 10,629 with 2,102 individual households.

There are informal settlements of squatters at Kerabari, Ramuwapur, Simaltari Charpala, Sirjanatole and Sundarbasti.

== Nearby tourist attractions ==
The Ramagrama stupa is a stupa located in Ramgram Municipality, about 11km from Sunwal. This Buddhist pilgrimage site, which was constructed around 2500 BCE, contains relics of Gautama Buddha. According to Buddhist texts, after Buddha's Mahaparinirvana, his cremated remains were divided and distributed among the princes of eight of the 16 mahājanapadās. Each of the princes constructed a stupa at or near his capital city, within which the respective portion of the ashes was enshrined. One of them was Rāmagrāma, a major city of the Koliya kingdom (sometimes referred to as Koliyanagara) at that time.

As of today, the Ramagrama stupa is the only intact and original stupa that contains relics of Buddha. The 7-metre (23 ft) high stupa is now buried under a mound of earth and is awaiting further research.
