= Tamasariya =

Tamasariya चोरमारा
- Small town
- Location in Nepal Tamasariya (Nepal)
- Coordinates: 27.63°N 84.03°E
- Country: Nepal
- Zone: Lumbini Zone
- District: Nawalparasi District

Population (1991)
  - Total: 6,942
- Time zone: UTC+5:45 (Nepal Time)

Tamasariya is a village development committee in Nawalparasi District in the Lumbini Zone of southern Nepal. According to the 1991 Nepal census, it had a population of 6942 people living in 1195 individual households. It is located between the Madyabindu Community Forest and Girubari River. The economy of the VDC is highly dependent on remittance. Most of the people are engaged in animal husbandry and farming. Chormara is generally referred to as a major market area of the region, which includes Tamasariya Village Development Committee (VDC) and Narayani VDC. It serves as the administrative headquarters for Tamsariya VDC.
