= Rampurwa, Parasi =

Coordinates: 29°13′N 80°58′E

Rampurwa रामपुर्वा
- Village development committee
- Interactive map of Rampurwa
- Country: Nepal
- Zone: Lumbini Zone
- District: Nawalparasi District

Population (1991)
  - Total: 8,820
- Time zone: UTC+5:45 (Nepal Time)

Rampurwa is a village development committee in Nawalparasi District in the Lumbini Zone of southern Nepal. At the 1991 Nepal census, it had a population of 3,689 people living in 542 households.
