= Dhurkot =

Dhurkot Rural Municipality
- Village development committee
- Nickname: धुर्कोट गाउपालिका
- Location in Nepal
- Coordinates: 27.66°N 83.76°E
- Country: Nepal
- Zone: Lumbini Zone
- District: Gulmi District

Population (2011)
  - Total: 3,847
- Time zone: UTC+5:45 (Nepal Time)

Dhurkot is a village development committee in Gulmi District in the Lumbini Zone of Nepal. At the 1991 Nepal census, it had a population of 3,847 people living in 651 individual households.
