= Deurali, Nawalpur =

Coordinates: 27.6900°N 84.0500°E

Deurali
- Village development committee
- Location in Nepal Deurali (Nepal)
- Country: Nepal
- Province: Gandaki Province
- District: Nawalpur District

Population (1991)
  - Total: 10,537
- Time zone: UTC+5:45 (Nepal Time)

Deurali is a village development committee in Nawalpur District in Gandaki Province of southern Nepal. At the time of the 1991 Nepal census it had a population of 10,537 people living in 1627 individual households.
