= Kawasoti =

Municipality in Gandaki Province, Nepal

Kawasoti कावासोती
- Municipality (नगरपालिका)
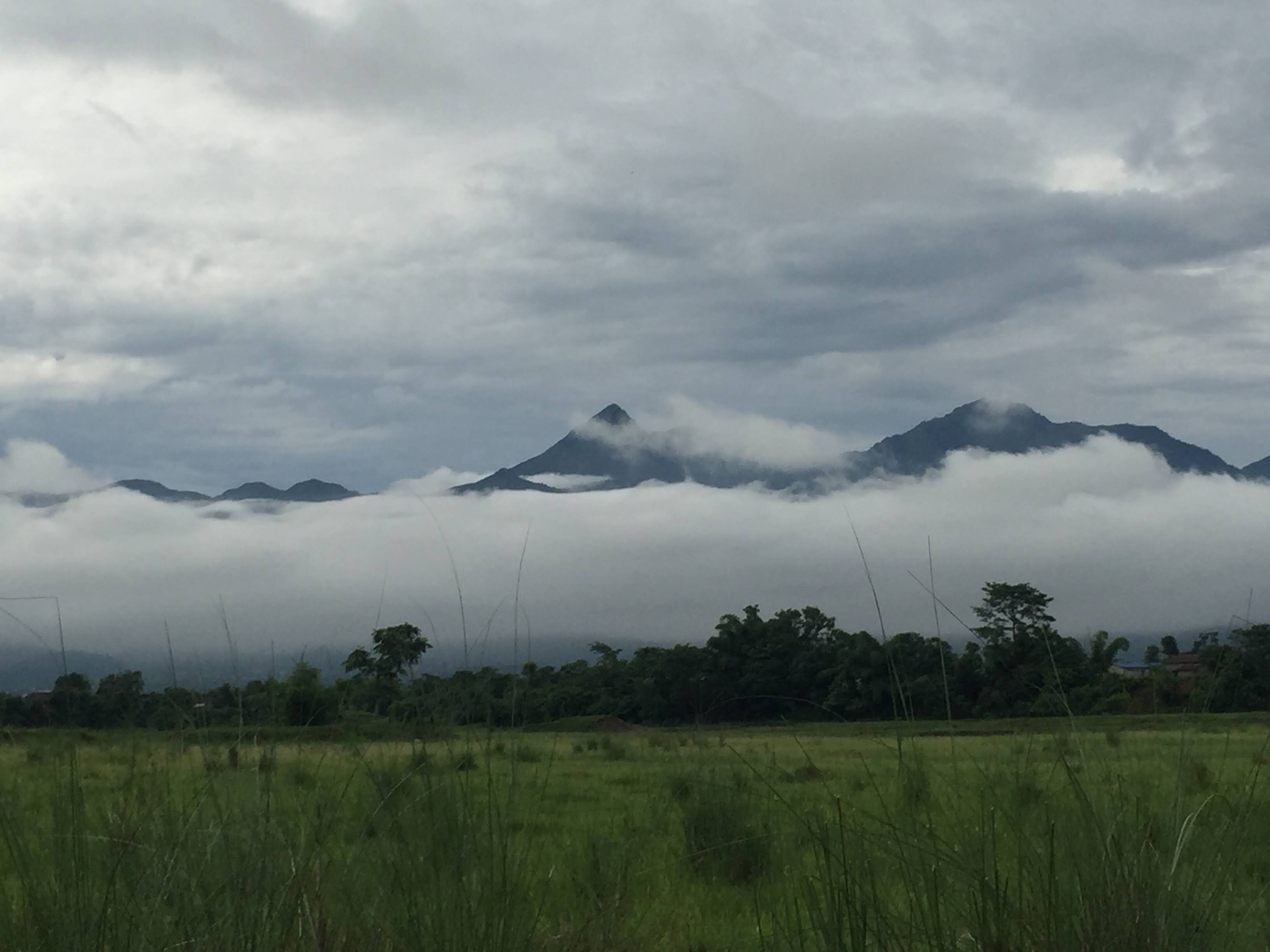
- Kawasoti Municipality
- Nickname: Kawasoti
- Location in Nepal Kawasoti (Nepal)
- Coordinates: 27°38′25.05″N 84°7′28.6″E
- Country: Nepal
- Province: Gandaki
- District: Nawalparasi(East of Bardaghat Susta)
- Established: 2071 BS (2015 AD)

Government
  - Type: Mayor–council government
  - Body: Kawasoti Municipal Government
  - Mayor: Bishnu Prasad Bhusal

Area
  - Total: 108.35 km^{2} (41.83 sq mi)
- Elevation: 180 m (590 ft)

Population
  - Total: 86,821
  - Density: 801.30/km^{2} (2,075.4/sq mi)

Languages
  - Official: Nepali
  - Local: Nepali, Magar, Gurung, Tharu
- Time zone: UTC+5:45 (NST)
- Postal Code: 33016
- Area code: +977 078
- Website: Official Website

Kawasoti (Nepali: कावासोती) is a municipality in Nawalpur District, Gandaki Province, Nepal. It is 31 km (19 mi) west of Bharatpur and 85 km (53 mi) east of Butwal, approximately on the middle of Mahendra Highway. The Naryani River flows south of it, and the Mahabharat Range is north of it.

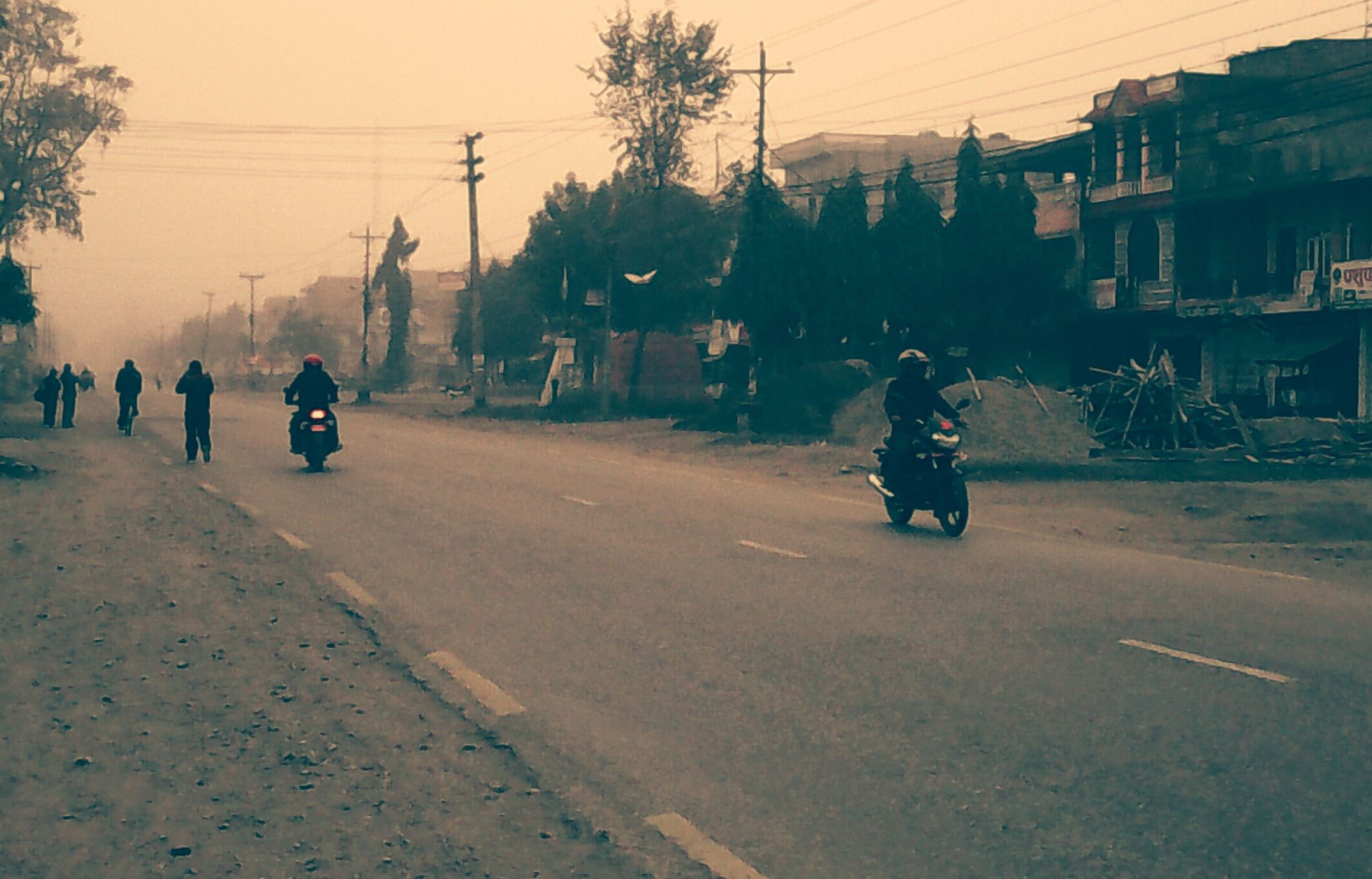
Kawasoti, Nawalpur district

Kawasoti serves as administrative headquarter for Nawalpur district, locating all major government and administrative offices. With the rapid increase in population and development of infrastructures, this city is quickly emerging into a business, educational and health hub on the center of the East-West Highway. It is one of the cities of Nawalpur district and is located in the middle of the country. It is also known as a greenery city where 60% of land is occupied by forests.

Nowadays Kawasoti VDC is better known by its new identity, i.e. Kawasoti municipality. People from various castes and religions coexist in this city with a majority of them Hindus, some Buddhists, and members of some other religions such as Christians and Muslims. More than 35 private and government schools and three colleges (Lumbini, Madhyabindu, and Kumarwarti) provide education from kindergarten to the master's degree level, which is attended by students as far as 30-km far from the city. The city also serves many local hospitals and pharmacies for the health facilities of residents. It has well-paved road networks, strong telecommunication service, well-managed drinking water, and drainage system and major sources for shopping and entertainment. In Kawasoti, police, as well as traffic police have been doing their job all over the district Nawalpur.

People have been constantly migrating to this city from neighboring hilly regions and districts for the last 30–40 years which was otherwise largely occupied by dense forests that lead to Chitwan National Park directly towards the south of this city.

== History ==
=== Kawasoti administration ===
Kawasoti municipality is a local government body formed in 2071 BS. It has 17 wards numbered from 1 to 17. Earlier, there were five VDCs: Kawasoti, Kumarwarti,Shivmandir, Agyauli, and Pithauli. The first mayor of the city was Chandra Kumari Pun elected in 2074 BS. Bishnu Prasad Bhusal was elected as the new mayor of Kawasoti, defeating the next candidate Mahendra Prasad Pokhrel.

== Population ==
According to the Website of the Kawasoti Municipality, the population of the Kawasoti Municipality is 86,821.

- Male: 40,523
- Female: 46,298
- Total: 86,821
- Total households: 22,166
- Total land: 108.35 square kilometers
- Total wards: 17

=== Main castes ===
Magar, Gurung, Tamang, Kumal, Newar, Bhujel, Bote, Kami, Damai, Brahman, Kshetri, Tharu, Thakuri, Giri people, Gaundel,कोइराला, गैह्रे magi

=== Religion ===
- Major: Hindu
- Minor: Buddhist, Muslim, Christian

=== Occupations ===
Occupation	Percentage	Occupation	Percentage
Agriculture	57%	Business	14.94%
Service	19.83%	Labour	2.78%
Industry	5.17%	Other	0.28%

== Water supply and sanitation ==
There exists a Kawasoti water supply system constructed under a small town that serves the town. There are two sources one is spring and another is a stream which provides water to the small town. There is well type intake in Kerunga Khola.

Solid waste management and toilets are the issues of this town. A report prepared on Kawasoti/Shiv mandir water supply and sanitation project states that 69.19% of the population has access to some kind of toilet. About 25% of HH have pit latrines, 13.19% have pit toilets with slab and 30.81% have water sealed latrines. Also, 0.1% have modern toilets constructed in their households. However, some places show deteriorated conditions, mainly due to open defecation and mismanagement of waste disposal. Solid waste has been managed to a certain extent. SSODECC-Nepal, a local NGO, is working on solid waste management. Generally, there is the door to the collection and disposal of off to a dumping site.

== Education ==
Kawasoti has many government as well as private schools, colleges, and institutes contributing to the educational sector of the district of Nawalpur.

In 2072, HSEB Science Examination District First and Second got their local campus, Madhyabindu Multiple Campus

Lumbini, Noble Academy, Gandaki etc are the school in the town that is undertaking the training of National Cadet Corps under the supervision of the Nepal Army. More importantly, Lumbini Aawasiya Madhyamik Vidhyalaya is also having students exchange at the international level. Shree Shiva Higher Secondary School is a top school of Kawasoti as well, as it is in the top 10 schools in Nepal and is named as a model school of Nepal.

=== Private, government and community schools ===
- Lumbini Aawasiya Madhyamik Vidhyalaya, Kawasoti-2
- Shree Shiva Higher Secondary School, Shivamandir
- Shree Tribhuwan Bal Secondary School, Kawasoti-17
- Shree Sunshine Secondary Boarding School, Kawasoti-17
- Shree Jeevan Jyoti Secondary school, Kawastoi bazaar
- Shree Gyanodaya Secondary School, Kawasoti 8
- Noble Academy, Shaikshik Chowk (kawasoti 8)
- Gandaki Secondary Boarding School, Kawasoti Municipality-8, Nawalpur
- Samata School, Kawasoti 2
- Siddhartha Boarding Secondary School, Kawasoti
- Nawalpur Academy, Danda, Shahidnagar
- Shree Shanti Nikunja Higher Secondary School, Pithauli
- Shree Janta Secondary School, Tribuwantar
- Shree Kalika Secondary School, Laxminagar
- shree Janata Secondary School, Sahidnagar, Danda
- shree saraswati model secondary school, kawasoti-4
- Saint Joseph Boarding School, kawasoti-3
- Skyline Academy, kawasoti-8

=== Higher level educational centers ===
- Lumbini Adarsha Degree College, Kawasoti
- Madhyabindu Multiple Campus, Kawasoti (a QAA certified institution)
- Kumarwarti Multiple Campus, Kawasoti (a QAA certified institution, the oldest higher education institution in the district)
- Shiva mavi secondary School

== Health ==
=== Hospitals and clinics ===
- Nawalpur Hospital Pvt. Ltd.
- Madhya Bindu Community Hospital
- Kaligandaki Community Hospital
- Integrated Hospital Pvt. Ltd.
- Ghale Eyes Hospital Pvt. Ltd.
- Nawa Jeewan Hospital Pvt. Ltd.
- Madhya Bindu Eye Care Center
- Kalika Dental Care
- Namuna Medical and Pathology
- Kumari Hospital, Hasaura
- Sudikshya Ayurved

=== Health centers ===
Governmental health posts: 4 (for every existing VDC, there is one health post), including:

- Shivamandir Health post
- Kawasoti Health Post
- Agyauli Health Post
- Pithauli Health Post
- Kumarwarti Health Post
- Madhyabindu Province Hospital

== Borders ==
- East: Devachuli Municipality and Chitwan National Park
- West: Madhyabindu Municipality
- North: Hupsekot Rural Municipality
- South: Chitwan National Park and Narayani River

== Major places ==
- Kawasoti Bazaar
- Thana Chowk
- Indra Chowk
- Sabhapati Chowk
- Purano Kawasoti Bazar
- Ram Nagar Chowk
- Danda Bazar
- Bishnunagar
- Thakali Chowk
- Magarkot
- Pithauli
- Tharu village
- Danda
- Shandh
- pashchhimtol

== Media ==
To promote local culture, Kawasoti has four FM radio stations and three local TV channels.

=== Radio channels ===
- Radio Madhyabindu F.M. – 101 MHz
- Radio Nawalpur – 104.7 MHz
- Radio Samarthya – 92.1 MHz
- Radio Kawasoti – 102.6 MHz

=== Local TV channels ===
- Devchuli TV
- Mukundasen Television (MTV)

== Tourism ==
Kawasoti is well known as a tourism destination. There are a lot of places to visit around Kawasoti.

- Amaltari Homestay
- Devchuli Hills
- Chitwan National Park
- Narayani River
- Newari Khaja Ghar & Guest House, CG
- Pokhari Taal
- Maharyaraja Thaan

== Takeways ==
Kawasoti's growing status as a business, educational, and health hub along the East-West Highway has significantly boosted its real estate market. The influx of residents and infrastructure development has fueled demand for property, making it an attractive location for both investment and residential purposes. This trend is especially noticeable with the rising interest in both residential and commercial properties across the area. For those interested in exploring available real estate options or investing in Kawasoti, you can find detailed listings, prices and informations on the Real Estate page, dedicated to providing up-to-date property listings across Nepal, including this rapidly developing city.
