= Ramgram Municipality =

Parasi रामग्राम Parasi
- Municipality
- Ramgram
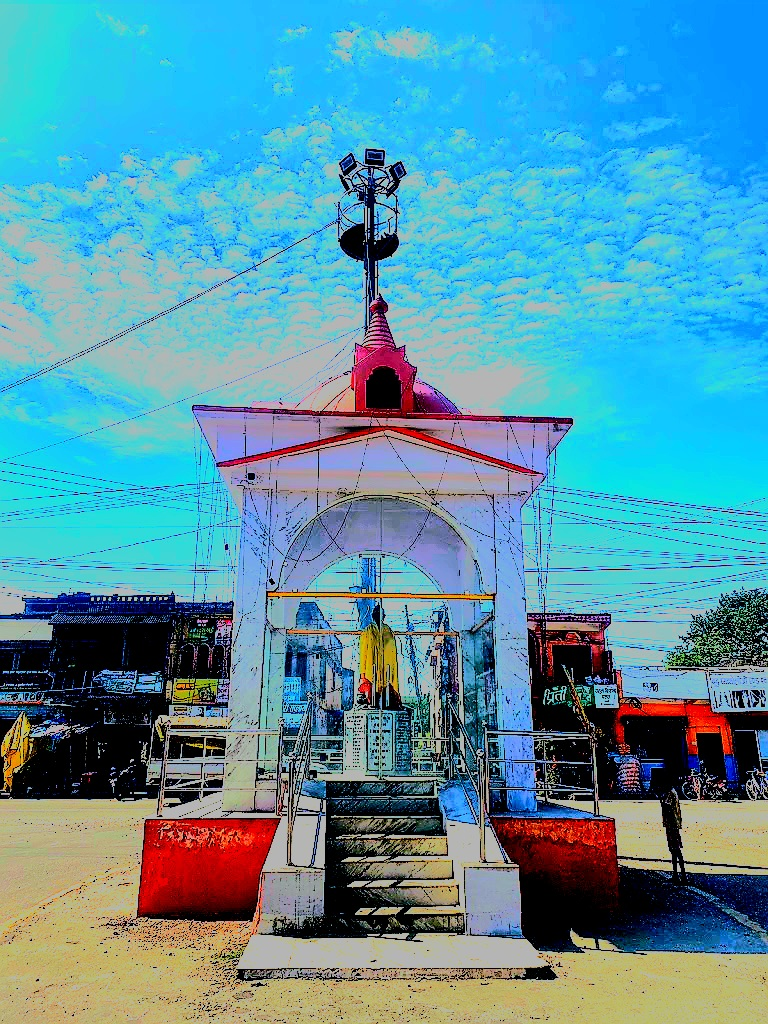
- Buddha Chowk
- Motto(s): "नगरबासीकाे सराेकार! स्वच्छ,पारदर्शी र विकासमुखी स्थानीय सरकार"
- Location in Nepal
- Coordinates: 27°32′N 83°40′E
- Country: Nepal
- Province: Lumbini
- District: Nawalparasi (West of Bardaghat Susta) District
- No. of Wards: 18

Government
  - Type: Mayor–council government
  - Body: Ramgram Municipality
  - Mayor: Dhanpat Yadav
  - Deputy Mayor: Samjhana Chaudhary

Area
  - Total: 96 km^{2} (37 sq mi)

Population (2021)
  - Total: 64,017
- Time zone: UTC+5:45 (NST)
- Postal code: 33000
- Area code: 078
- Climate: Cwa
- Website: http://ramgrammun.gov.np

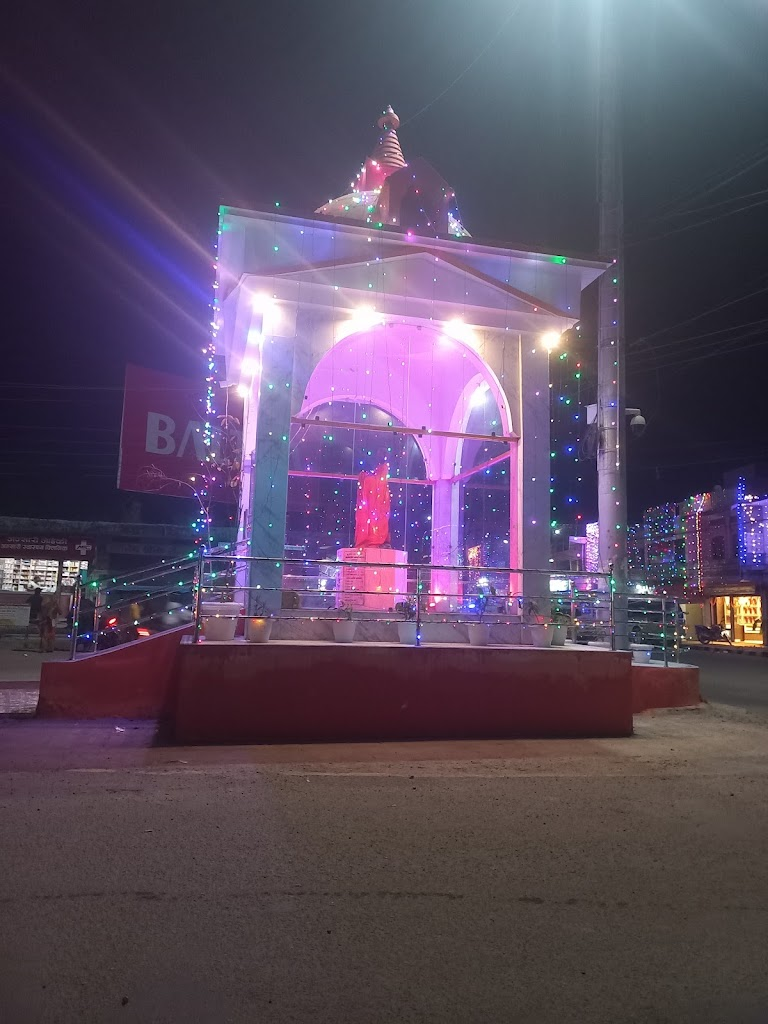

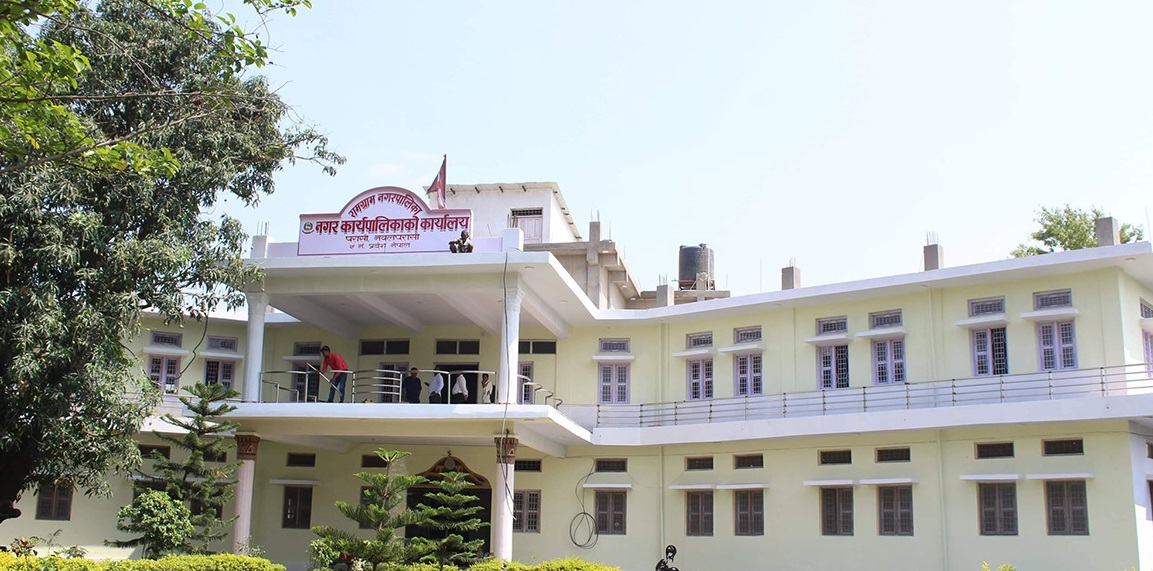

Ramgram is a town and municipality that is the capital of the Nawalparasi (West of Bardaghat Susta) District in Lumbini Province of Nepal. At the time of the 2011 Nepal census, it had a population of 64,017 in 13,137 households. The former name, Parasi, is still widely used.

Ramgram is located about 9 kilometres (5.6 mi) from the Mahendra Highway, the arterial roadway of Nepal (connected through the Sunwal Municipality). The roadway is also called Tanka Prasad Acharya Marga. Jeeps and buses run through this roadway from the Sunwal Jeep Station. It is also connected through a highway, 5 kilometres (3.1 mi) from Bumahi, a small town connected to Mahendra Highway.

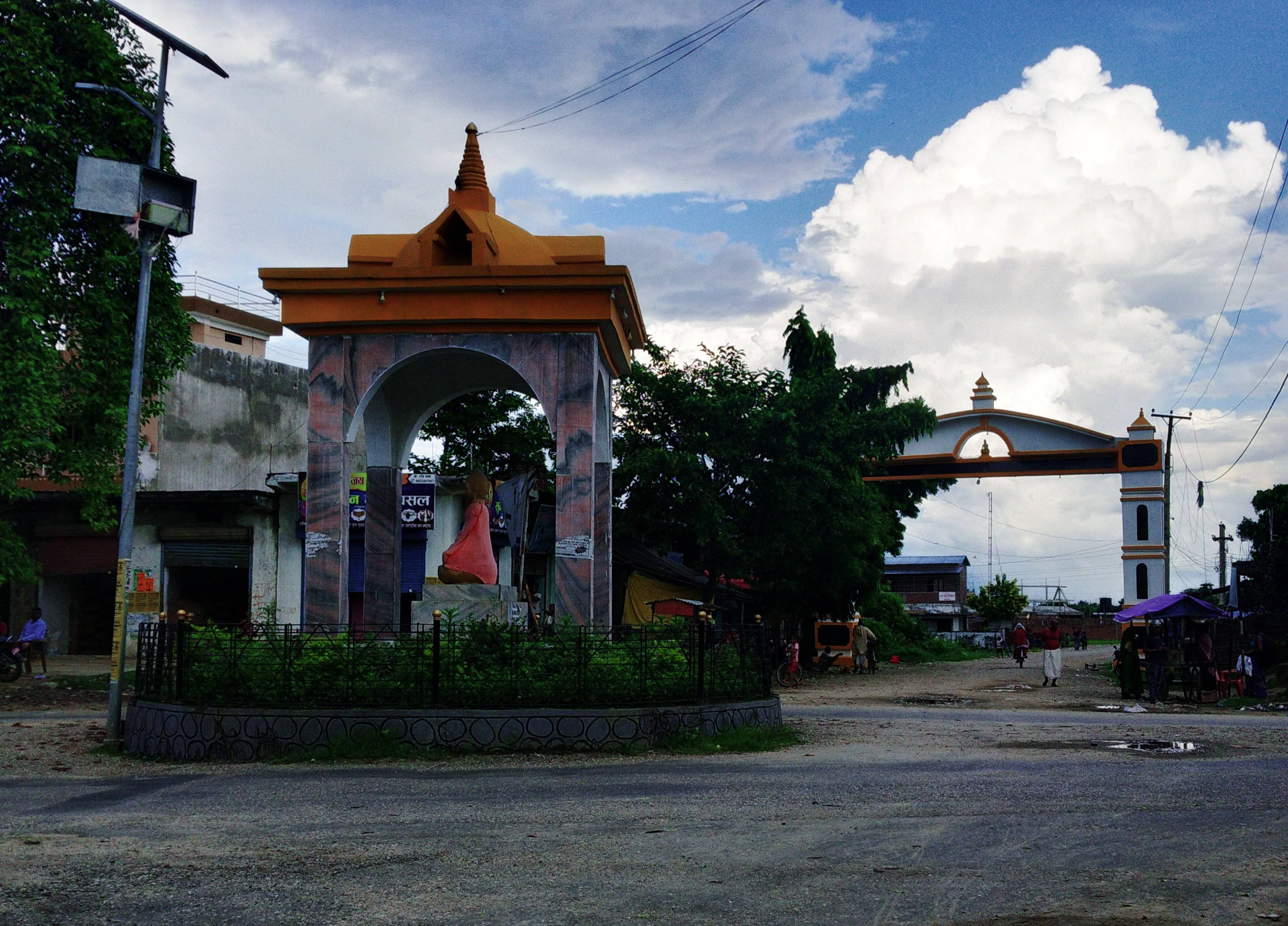
Statue and entrance gate at Ramgrama stupa

Ramgram's population is mainly Hindu, but it is also an important place for Buddhists because it is the location of Ramagrama stupa; the stupa, which was constructed around 2500 BCE, contains one of the relics of Buddha. Every year, about 7,000 tourists visit the stupa.

3 kilometres (1.9 mi) southwest of the Ramgram stupa is another temple known as Pali Bhagvati Temple, which is dedicated to Durga Goddess. There is a small river known as Jharahi. The place is situated in Ujaingadha, now known as Ujaini. It is also known as the maternal house of Gautam Buddha.

== Demographics ==
=== Languages ===
Bhojpuri is the most spoken language in Ramagram. 80.2% of the population spoke Bhojpuri, 9.2% Nepali, 9.1% Tharu as their first language. 1.5% of the population spoke Other languages.

Languages in Ramgram.
1. Bhojpuri (80.2%)
2. Nepali (9.20%)
3. Tharu (9.10%)
4. Others (1.50%)

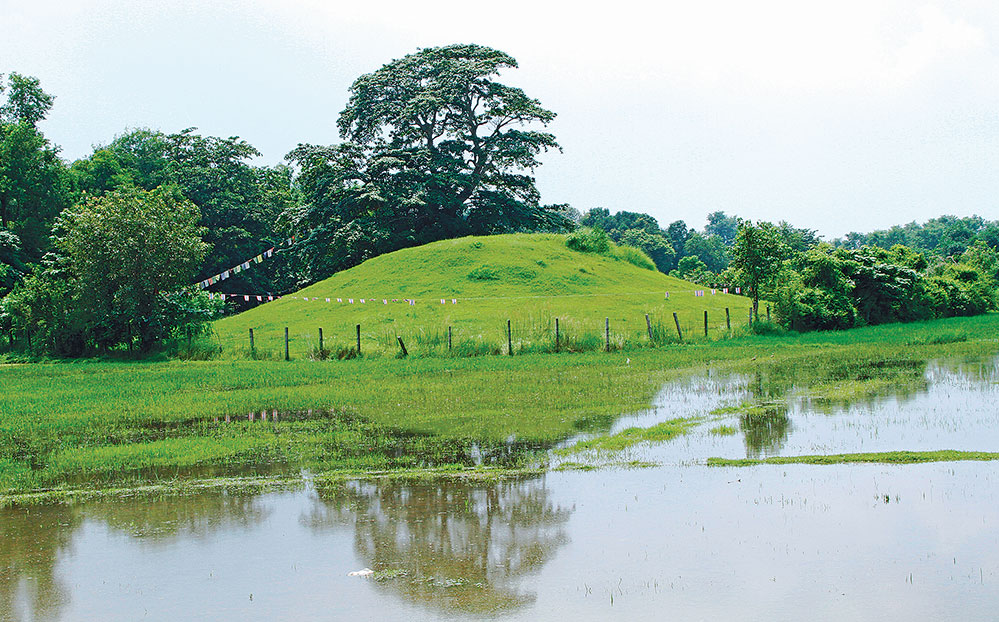

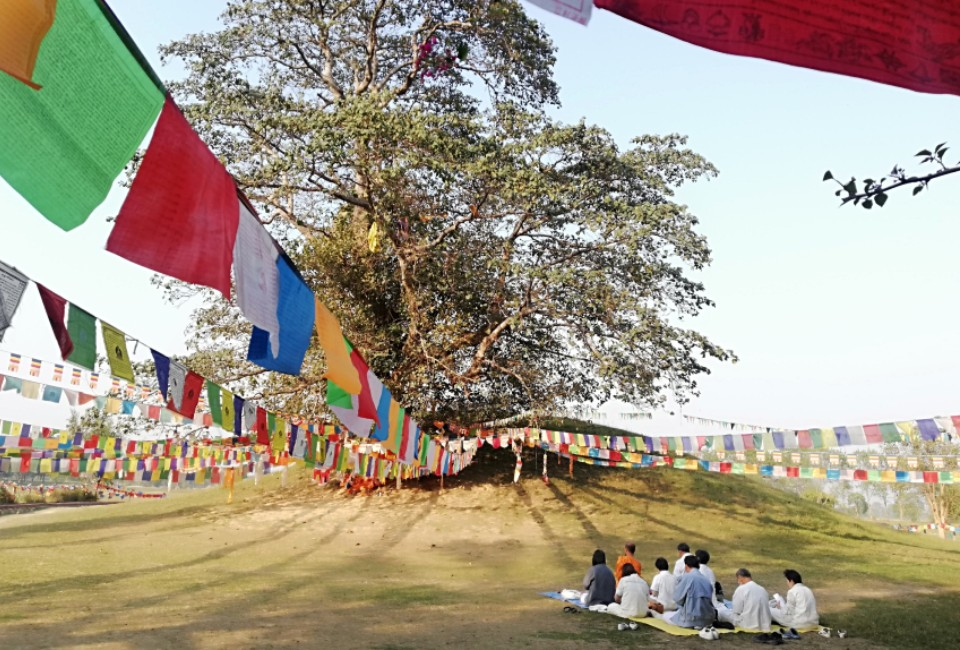
Ramagrama stupa
