= Manari, Nepal =

Manari मनरी
- Village development committee
- Location in Nepal
- Coordinates: 27.53°N 83.72°E
- Country: Nepal
- Zone: Lumbini Zone
- District: Nawalparasi District

Population (1991)
  - Total: 4,630
- Time zone: UTC+5:45 (Nepal Time)

Manari is a village in Nawalparasi West District in the Lumbini Province of southern Nepal. At the time of the 1991 Nepal census Manari Village Development Committee had a population of 4630 people living in 647 individual households.

Manari is located 5 km east from the district headquarters and 5 km south from the east west highway Mahendra Rajmarg. It is situated to south from Tilakpur v.d.c similarly Jahada, sarawal and devgaun and Ramgram Municipality are close to east, south and west. It is divided in 9 ward and the main villages are Manari, Ahirauli, Tilauli, Atrahati, Jawa, Jamuniya, Patani, Pipara and Mahuawa.

Manari is flatland and it is produces rice and wheat. Tharu are the main tribal of this v.d.c and some other minor tribes also exists. Tharus are famous for their own custom and culture. Generosity and living with peace and helpfulness are their basic identities. Basic facilities including school, roads and health post are available but not good quality. Janata High School is the oldest school and some other high and primary schools also exist. There are two famous Shiva's temples are located in Manari and Atrahati. A yearly cultural festival is organised in January which is called khichadee festival organised by tribal tharus with some cultural show. It is now becoming famous.

In Manari there are altogether 9 wards; among them Tilauli village is unique in sense in simplicity for tharu and other tribes life style. More than 200 families stay in Tilauli. Most of them are involved in agriculture and few are struggling to get jobs. Most of people are illiterate and some are well educated.
