= Madhyabindu =

Municipality in Lumbini, Nepal

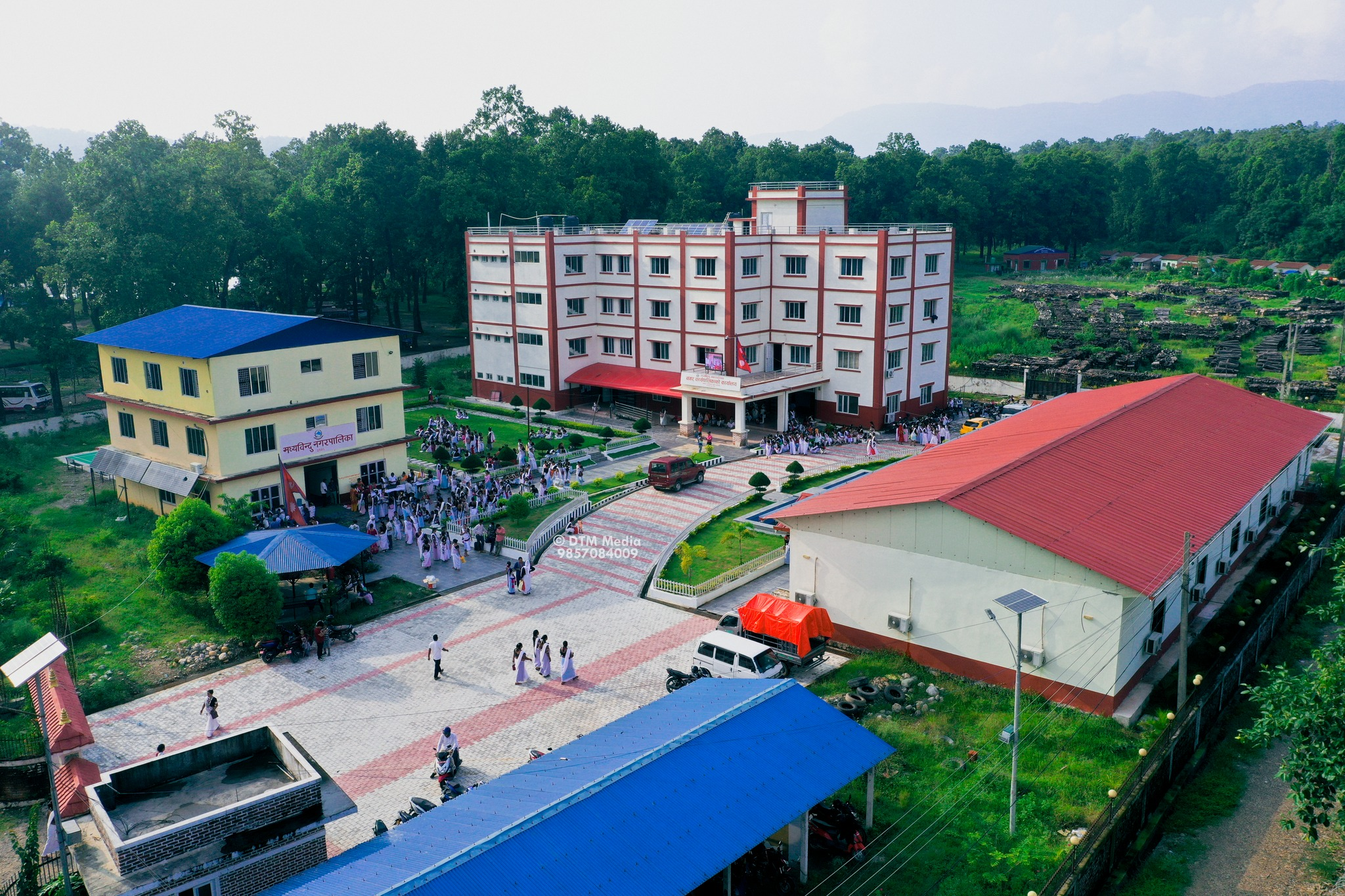

Madhyabindu is a municipality of Nawalpur District in Lumbini Zone of southern Nepal. The municipality was established on 19 September 2015 by merging the existing Tamasariya, Naya Belahani and Kolhuwa village development committees (VDCs). The center of the municipality is established in the former Tamasariya VDC of Chormara Bazaar. After merging the three VDCs population it had a total population of 28,224 according to 2011 Nepal census. After the government decision the number of Sub Metropolitan cities and municipalities has reached 12 and 217 respectively in Nepal.

Chormara Bajar is located at the mid-point East-West Mahendra highway. it is one of the oldest residential areas in the Nawalparasi district. Arunkhola is the largest bazaar of Madhyabindu located at Madhyabindu ward no 10. One of the oldest Brewery companies in Nepal Shree Distillery Pvt ltd is also situated at Arunkhola Bazar. Most of the area's forest is part of Chitwan National Park. it was established in 1973 and was granted the status of a World Heritage Site in 1984. The municipality shares the border with India to the south, and which Narayani river separates the nations.
