= Daunne Devi Temple =

Hindu temple in Nepal

- दाउन्ने देवी मन्दिर (Daunne Devi Mandir)
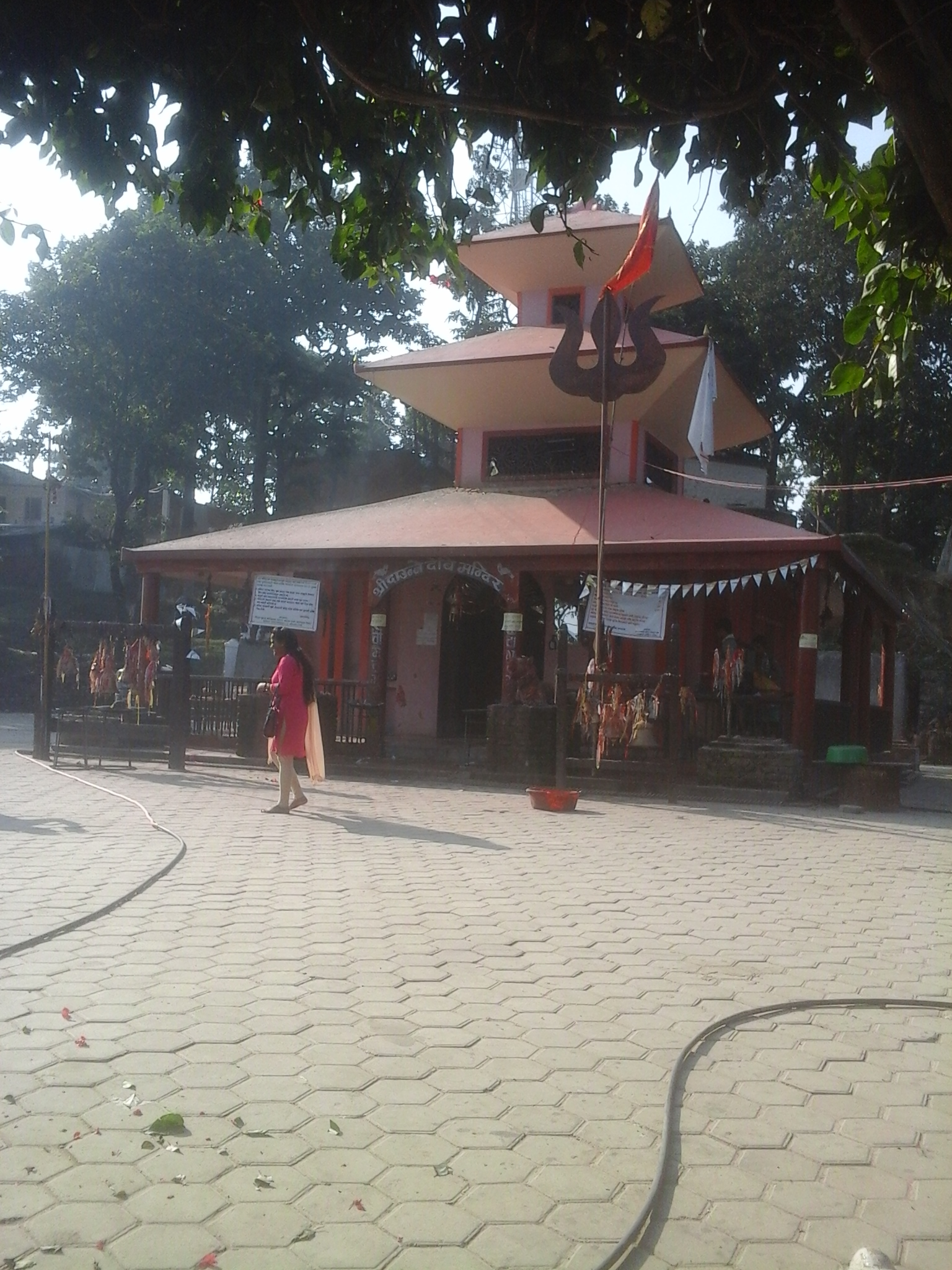

- Location in Nepal

Religion
- Affiliation: Hinduism
- District: Nawalparasi District
- Deity: Durga, Shiva
- Festivals: Dashain and Chaite Dashain

Location
- Location: Dumkibas, Bardaghat Municipality
- Country: Nepal
- Interactive map of Daunne Devi Temple
- Coordinates: 27.550°N 83.837°E

Daunne Devi Temple (Nepali: दाउन्ने देवी मन्दिर) is a Hindu temple of Durga located in, Nawalparasi district of Nepal. The temple lies in the hill pass at an elevation of 1033 m msl in route from Bardaghat to Dumkibas. The temple also has Shivalaya due to which the temple is visited by pilgrimages in the month of Shrawan. The temple is believed to be established by Jung Bahadur Rana.

The Daunne hill was called Trikut Parbat in ancient times. It was place where Valmiki came for meditation. The place is also believed to be visited by Mayadevi, the mother of Sakyamuni Buddha, for meditation.

The temple is maintained by user community since 2049 BS. The current temple was constructed in 2055 BS. In 2032 BS, archeological excavation discovered three inscriptions near the temple. Another survey in 2053 BS discovered ancient coins.

== See also ==
- Maula Kalika Temple
- List of Hindu temples in Nepal
