= Parasi, Nepal =

Parasi परासी
- Municipality
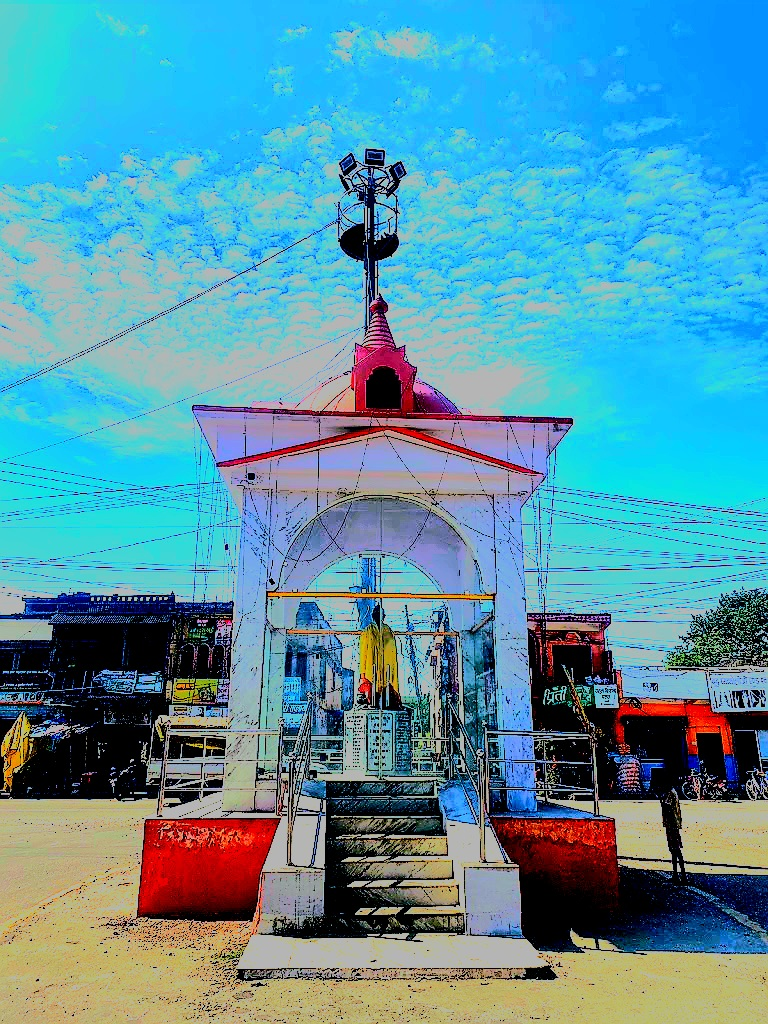
- Buddha chowk
- Country: Nepal
- Province: Lumbini Province
- District: Nawalparasi (West of Bardaghat Susta) district

Population (2001)
  - Total: 25,990
- Time zone: UTC+5:45 (Nepal Time)
- Postal code: 33000
- Area code: 078

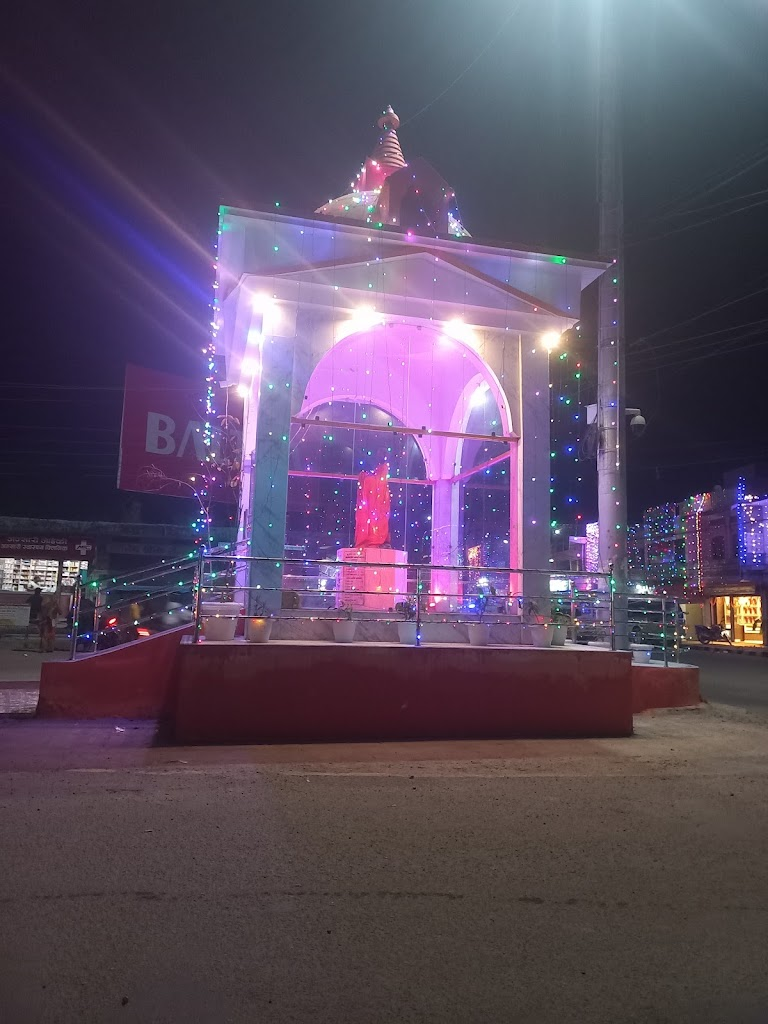

Parasi is a place in Ramgram, Nepal Municipality in Parasi District in the Lumbini Province of southern Nepal. At the time of the 1991 Nepal census, it had a population of 7281 people living in 1320 individual households.

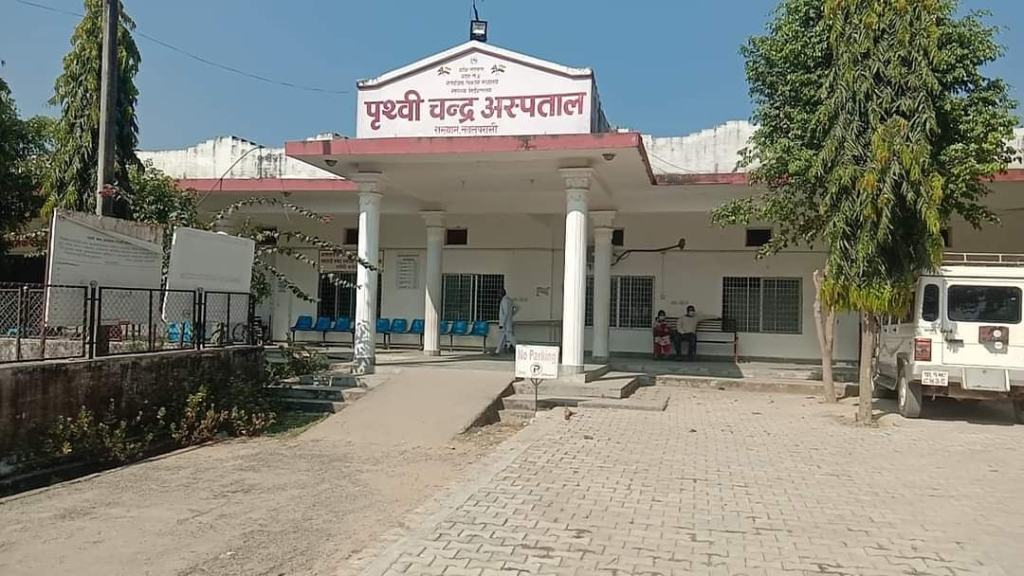

Parasi is in the Terai region and borders India to the south. Ramgrama stupa and Palhi temple are famous religious place in Parasi.
