= Nawalparasi (West of Bardaghat Susta) district =

Nawalparasi (West of Bardaghat Susta) नवलपरासी (बर्दघाट सुस्ता पश्चिम)
- District
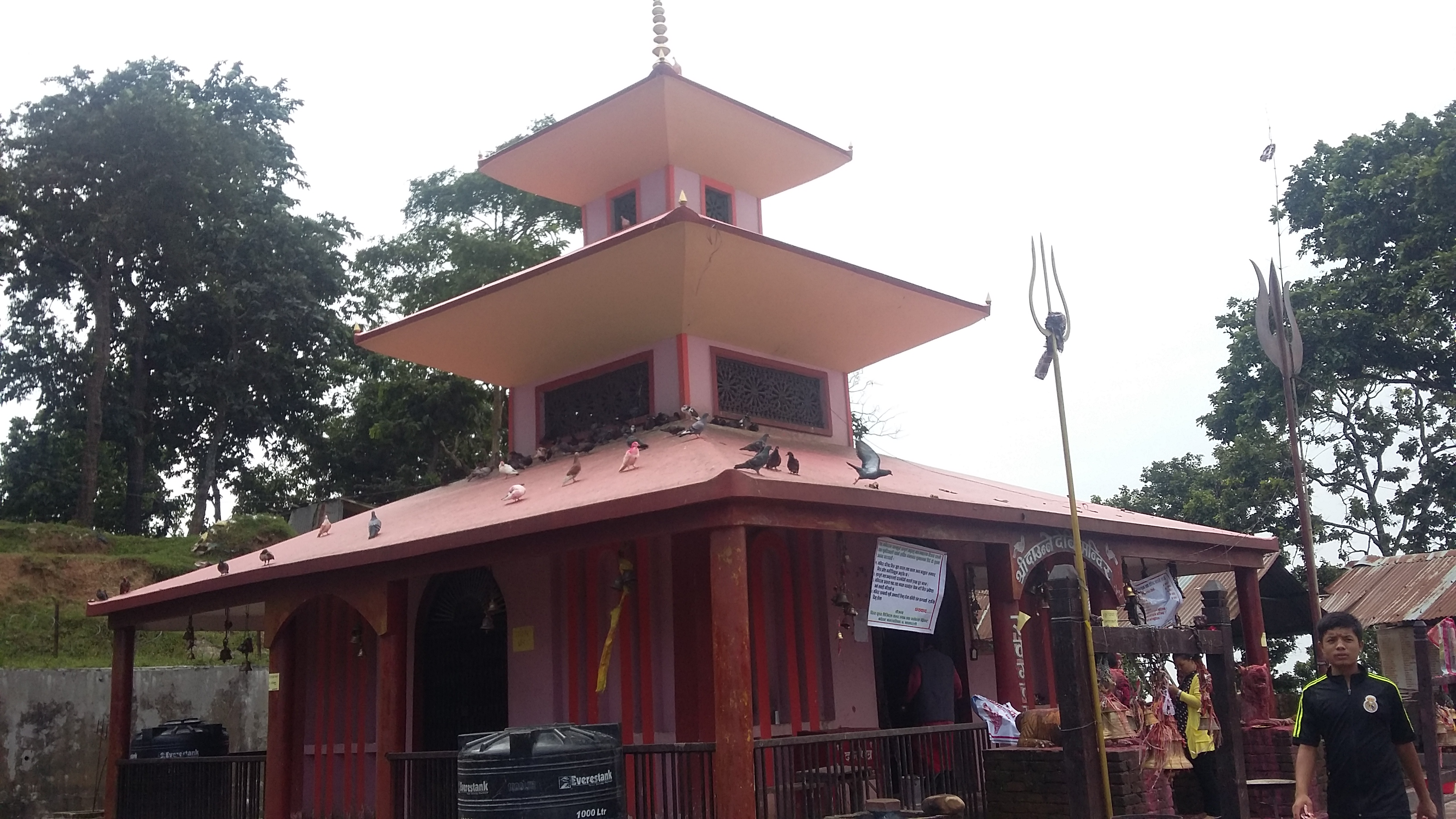
- Daunne Devi Temple
- Nickname: नवलपरासी पश्चिम or नवलपरासी (ब.सु.प.) or परासी
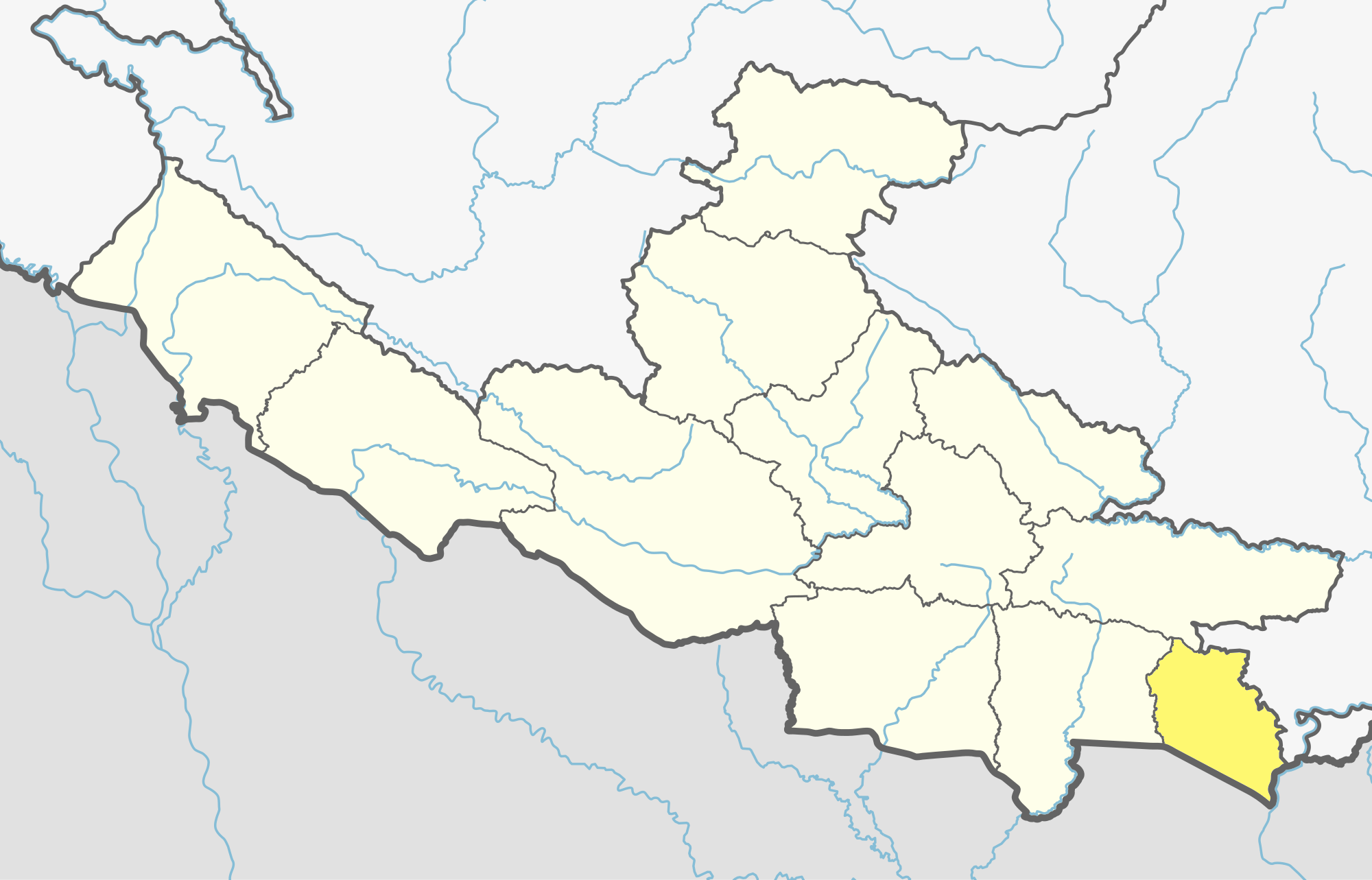
- Location of Nawalparasi West (dark yellow) in Lumbini Province

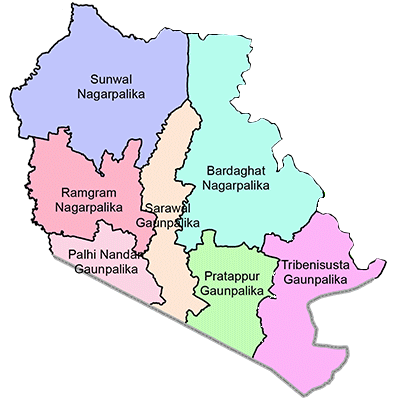
- Divisions of Nawalparasi West
- Coordinates: 27.32°N 83.40°E
- Country: Nepal
- Province: Lumbini
- Established: 2015
- Admin HQ.: Parasi

Government
  - Type: Coordination committee
  - Body: DCC, Parasi

Area
  - Total: 634.88 km^{2} (245.13 sq mi)

Population
  - Total: 321,058
  - Density: 505.70/km^{2} (1,309.8/sq mi)
- Time zone: UTC+05:45 (NPT)
- Website: dccnawalparasiwest.gov.np

Nawalparasi (West of Bardaghat Susta) district or Nawalparasi West, as known commonly (Nepali: नवलपरासी (बर्दघाट सुस्ता पश्चिम) वा नवलपरासी पश्चिम [nʌwʌlpʌˈɾasi ˈpʌst͡sim]), also frequently referred to as just Parasi District, is a district located in Lumbini Province of Nepal. It is 1 out of 12 districts of Lumbini Province. The headquarter of the district is located in Ramgram.

Formerly, Nawalparasi West was a part of Nawalparasi District, the other part being Nawalparasi East (natively called Nawalpur). Thus, the districts Nawalparasi (West of Bardaghat Susta) and Nawalparasi (East of Bardaghat Susta) were created after the state's reconstruction of administrative divisions as of 20 September 2015.

The total area of Nawalparasi District is 634.88 square kilometres (245.13 sq mi) and total population of this district as of 2011 Nepal census is 321058 individuals. Bhojpuri is the local language of the district.

== Demographics ==
At the time of the 2021 Nepal census, Parasi District had a population of 386868. 8.04% of the population is under 5 years of age. It has a literacy rate of 77.97% and a sex ratio of 1056 females per 1000 males. 212,805 (55.01%) lived in municipalities.

Ethnic groups/castes in Parasi district (2021)
1. Tharu (17.6%)
2. Bahun (11.3%)
3. Chamar (7.22%)
4. Magar (7.12%)
5. Muslim (6.68%)
6. Yadav (5.52%)
7. Chhetri (4.63%)
8. Kewat (3.55%)
9. Teli (3.33%)
10. Kami (3.14%)
11. Rajbhar (2.09%)
12. Gurung (1.90%)
13. Kahar (1.88%)
14. Other Madheshi non-Dalit (13.4%)
15. Other Madheshi Dalit (3.70%)
16. Other Hill Janjati (2.04%)
17. Other Khas Dalit (1.69%)
18. Other Khas non-Dalit (1.40%)
19. Others (1.70%)

Tharu people are the largest group, making up 17.65% of the population. Bahun are the second-largest group, making up 11% of the population and followed by others group as shown in pie chart.

Religion in Parasi District (2021)
Religion	Percent
Hinduism	87.59%
Islam	7.24%
Buddhism	3.61%
Christianity	1.12%
Prakriti	0.44%

=== Languages ===
Languages of Parasi District (2021)
1. Bhojpuri (50.9%)
2. Nepali (28.8%)
3. Tharu (13.8%)
4. Magar (3.69%)
5. Gurung (1.00%)
6. Others (1.71%)

At the time of the 2021 census, 50.94% of the population spoke Bhojpuri, 28.84% Nepali, 13.82% Tharu, 3.69% Magar and 1.00% Gurung as their first language.

== Divisions ==
The district is divided into 7 local level body in which 3 are urban municipality and 4 are rural municipality.

=== Urban municipality ===
- Bardaghat
- Ramgram
- Sunwal

=== Rural municipality ===
- Susta Rural Municipality
- Palhinandan Rural Municipality
- Pratappur Rural Municipality
- Sarawal Rural Municipality

== See also ==
- People's Progressive Party
- Nawalpur District
