= Nawalpur District =

Nawalpur District नवलपुर
- District
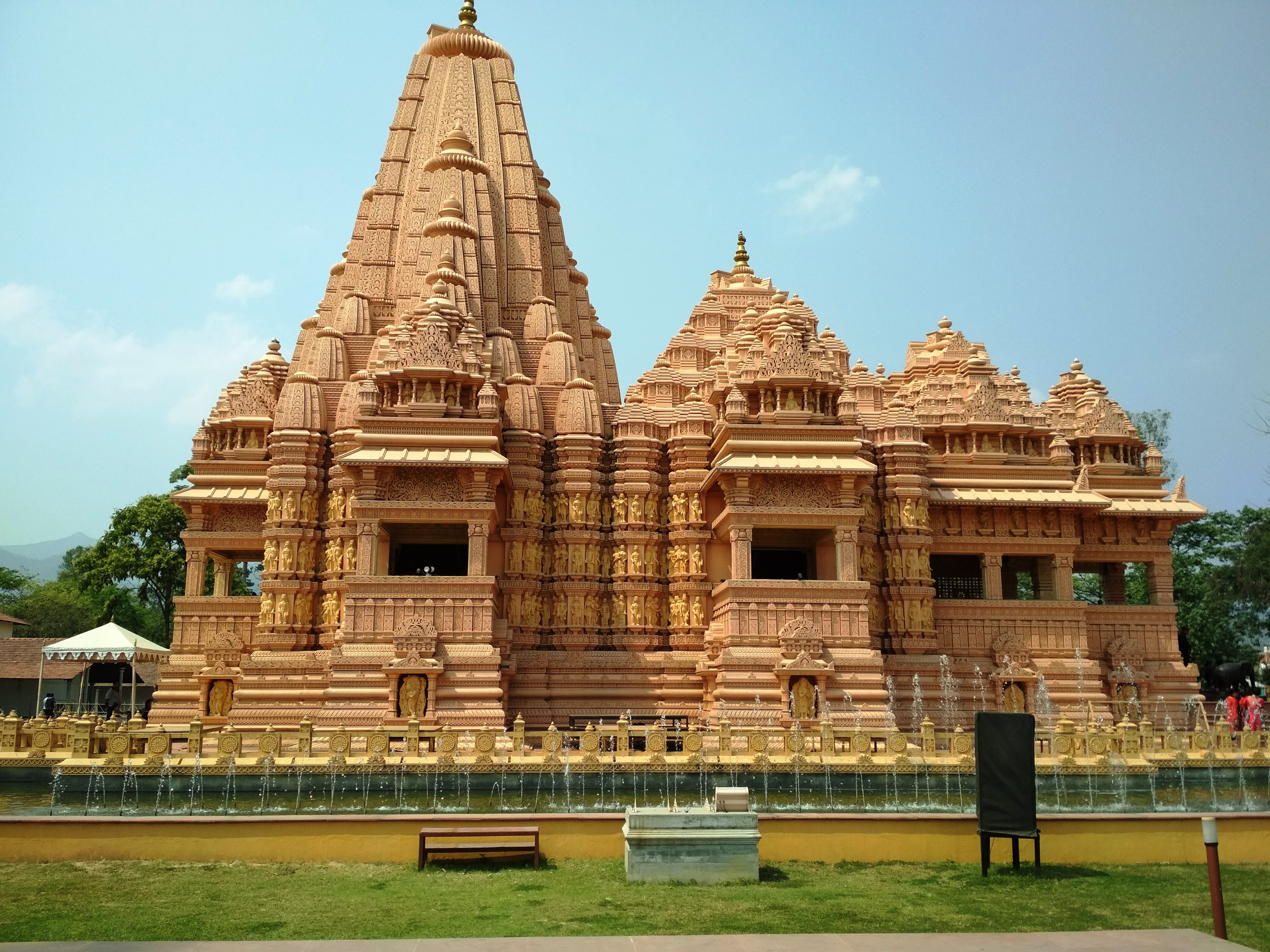
- Shashwat Dham, Devachuli

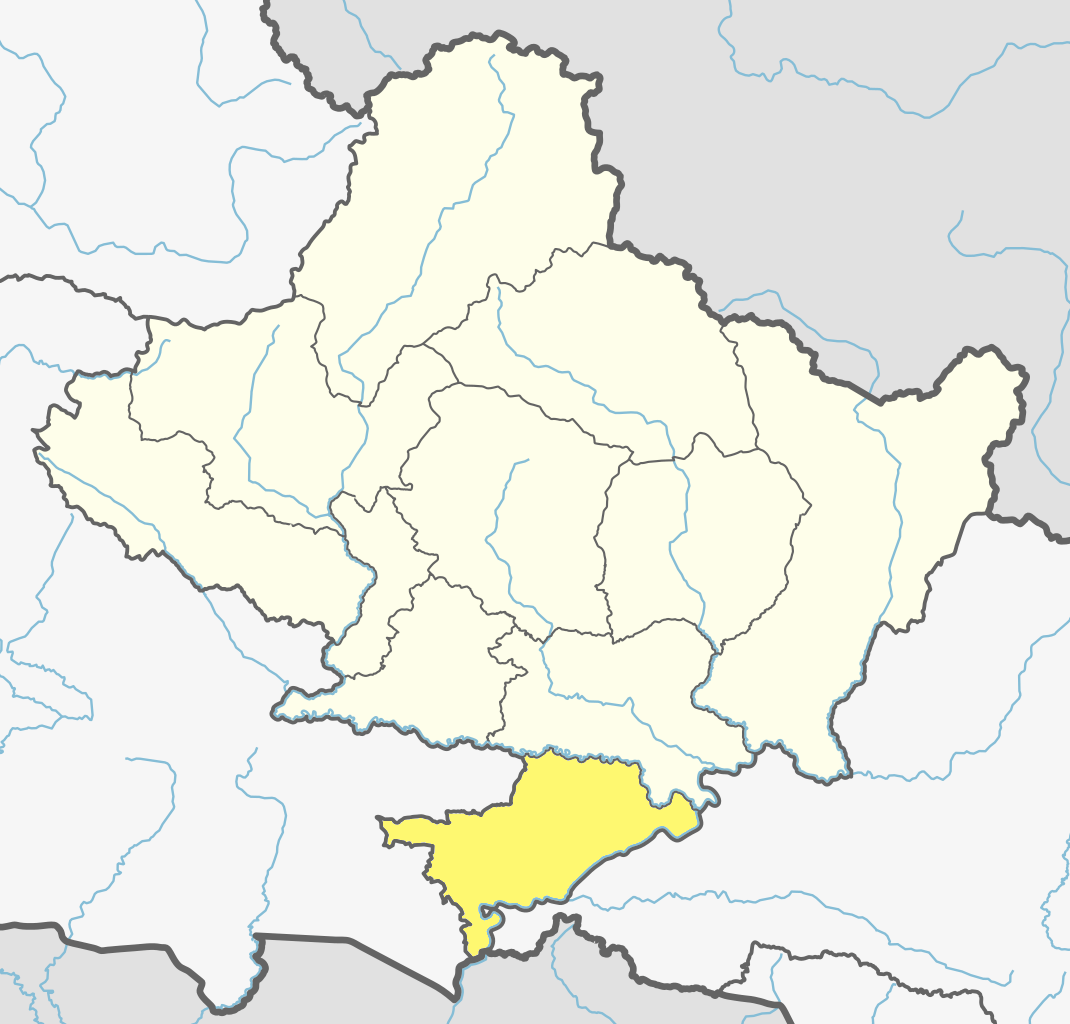
- Location of Nawalpur (dark yellow) in Gandaki Province

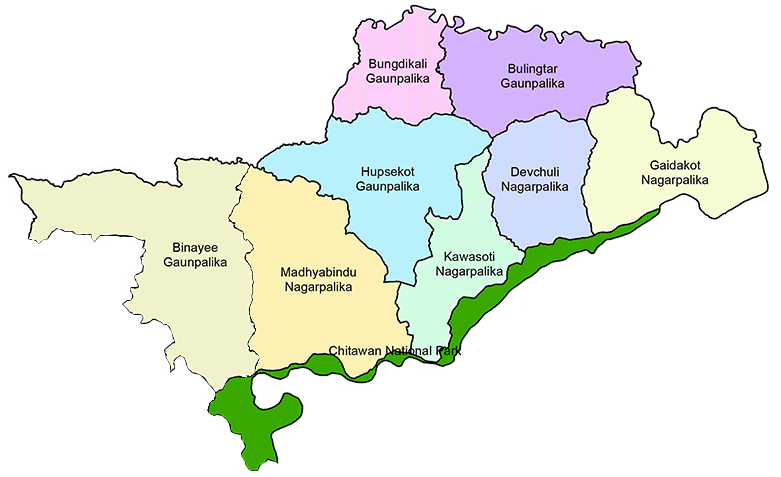
- Divisions of Nawalpur
- Interactive map of Nawalpur District
- Coordinates: 27.32°N 83.40°E
- Country: Nepal
- Province: Gandaki Province
- Established: during Rana regime
- Disestablished: 1962
- Reestablished: 2015
- Admin HQ.: Kawasoti

Government
  - Type: Coordination committee
  - Body: DCC, Nawalpur

Area
  - Total: 1,331.16 km^{2} (513.96 sq mi)

Population
  - Total: 310,864
  - Density: 233.529/km^{2} (604.836/sq mi)
- Time zone: UTC+05:45 (NPT)
- Website: www.ddcnawalparasi.gov.np

Nawalpur (/nəˌwʌlˈpʊər/, Nepali: नवलपुर, pronounced [ˈnʌwʌlpur]) is one of 11 districts of Gandaki Province of Nepal. The headquarters of the district is Kawasoti.

Nawalpur District and Parasi District were formerly a single district, Nawalparasi District, until a reorganization effective 20 September 2015.

The total area of Nawalpur District is 1,331.16 square kilometres (513.96 sq mi) and total population of this district as of 2011 Nepal census is 310864 individuals.

== History ==
During Rana regime, Nawalpur district was a sub-district of Chitwan District then it established separately and again merged with a small portion (Parasi) of Butwal District and established Nawalparasi District. In 2015 again Nawalpur District was again separately reestablished.

== Divisions ==
The district is divided into four urban municipalities and four rural municipalities.

=== Urban municipalities ===
- Kawasoti Municipality (Headquarters)
- Gaindakot Municipality
- Devchuli Municipality
- Madhyabindu Municipality

=== Rural municipalities ===
- Baudikali Rural Municipality
- Bulingtar Rural Municipality
- Binayi Tribeni Rural Municipality
- Hupsekot Rural Municipality

== Demographics ==
Historical population
| Census year | Pop. | ±% p.a. |
|---|---|---|
| 1981 | 149,543 | — |
| 1991 | 211,228 | +3.51% |
| 2001 | 272,557 | +2.58% |
| 2011 | 311,604 | +1.35% |
| 2021 | 381,105 | +2.03% |
Source: Citypopulation

At the time of the 2021 Nepal census, Nawalpur District had a population of 378079. 7.54% of the population is under 5 years of age. It has a literacy rate of 82.35% and a sex ratio of 1125 females per 1000 males. 285,264 (75.45%) lived in municipalities.

Castes/ethnic groups in Nawalpur district (2021)
1. Magar (27.5%)
2. Bahun (23.7%)
3. Tharu (11.0%)
4. Chhetri (8.25%)
5. Kami (6.24%)
6. Kumal (3.78%)
7. Newar (2.92%)
8. Gurung (2.89%)
9. Damai (2.68%)
10. Thakuri (1.70%)
11. Tamang (1.44%)
12. Sarki (1.44%)
13. Terai Brahmin (1.05%)
14. Other Hill Janjati (2.60%)
15. Others (2.85%)

Magars are the single largest ethnicity, making up 27% of the population. Khas people make up 44% of the population, of which Bahun and Chhetri are the largest groups. Khas Dalits are 10% of the population. There is also a large Tharu population.

Languages of Nawalpur district (2021)
1. Nepali (59.9%)
2. Magar (22.0%)
3. Tharu (10.4%)
4. Gurung (1.76%)
5. Bhojpuri (1.42%)
6. Nepal Bhasha (1.27%)
7. Others (3.30%)

At the time of the 2021 census, 59.88% of the population spoke Nepali, 22.00% Magar, 10.37% Tharu, 1.76% Gurung, 1.42% Bhojpuri and 1.27% Nepal Bhasha as their first language. In 2011, 55.3% of the population spoke Nepali as their first language.

Religion in Nawalpur District (2021)
| Religion | Percent |
| Hinduism | 87.13% |
| Buddhism | 8.80% |
| Christianity | 3.01% |
| Islam | 0.67% |
| Other or not stated | 0.39% |

== See also ==
- Parasi District
