= Lumbini Zone =

Coordinates: 27°45′N 83°30′E

Lumbinī Anchal लुम्बिनी अञ्चल
- Zone
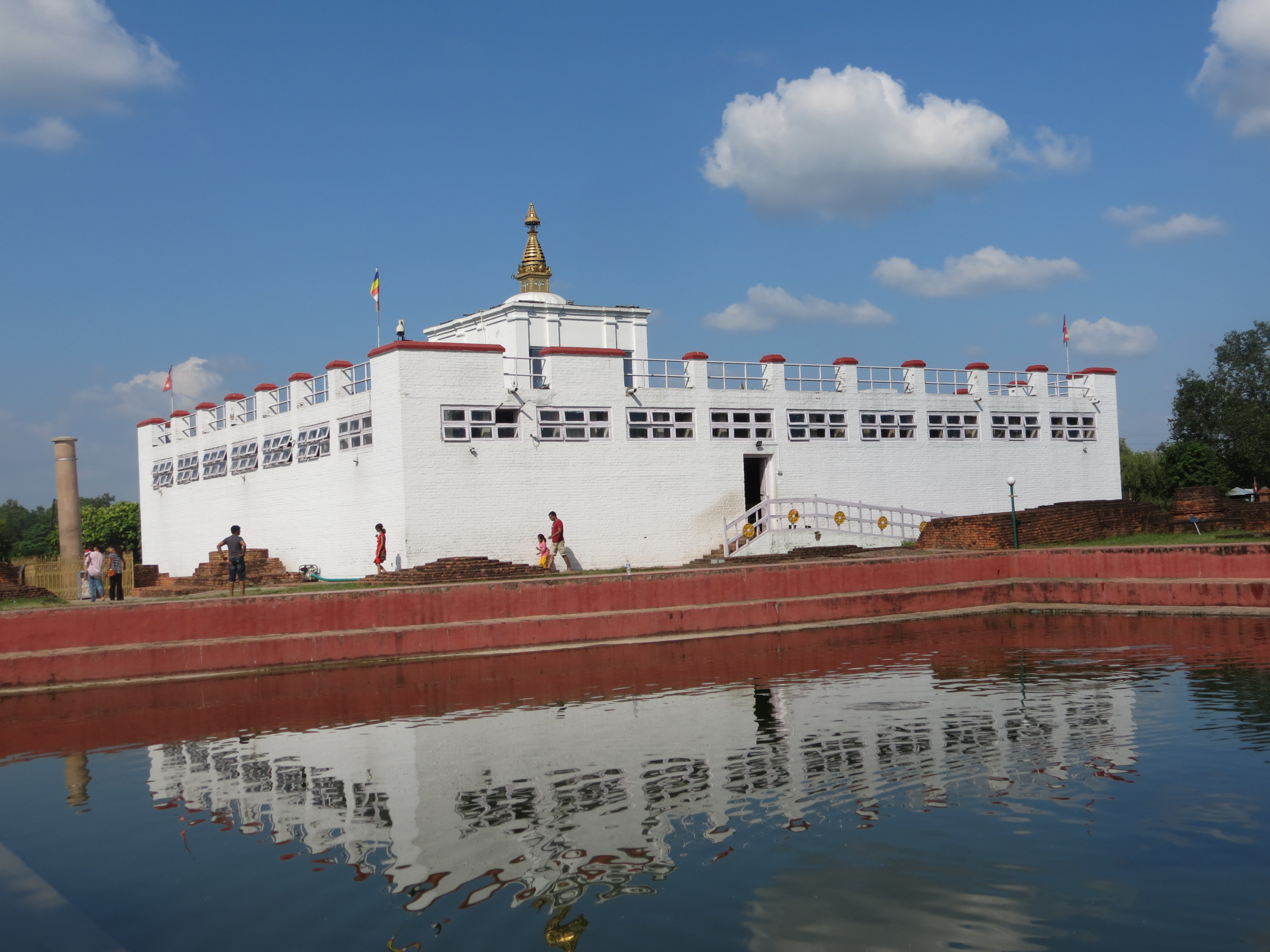
- Mayadevi Temple

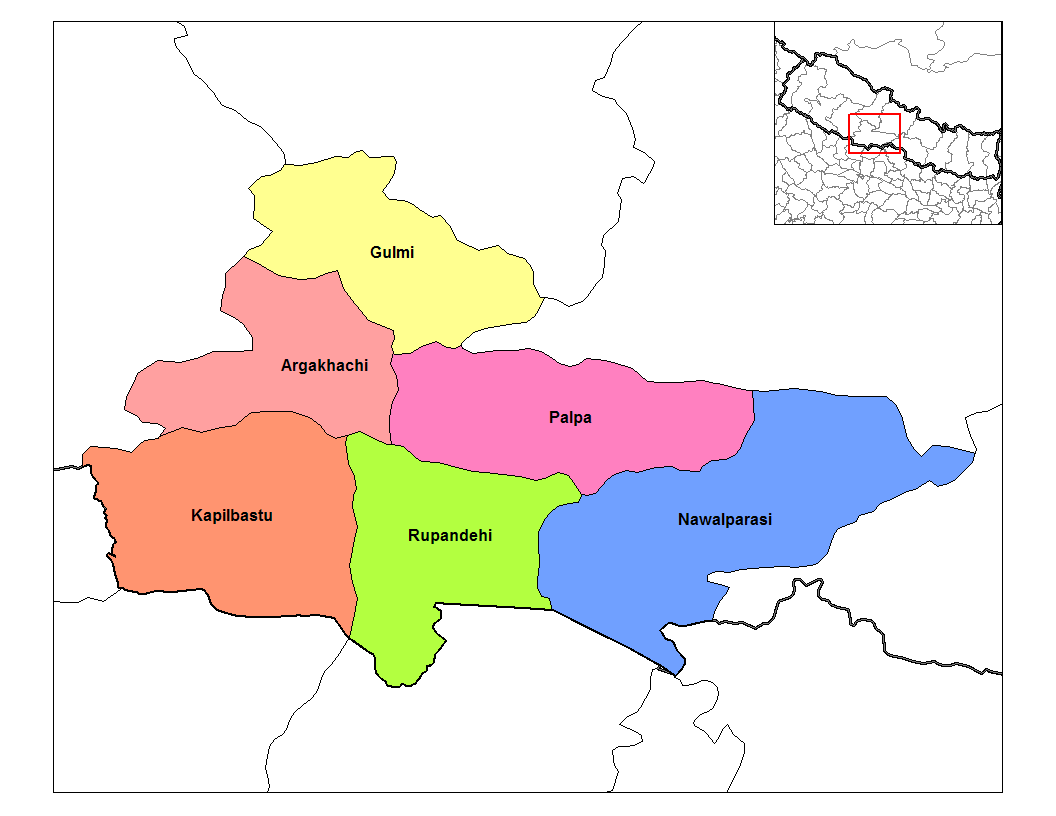
- Country: Nepal
- Capital: Butwal

Area
  - Total: 8,975 km^{2} (3,465 sq mi)

Population (2011)
  - Total: 2,834,612
  - Density: 315.8/km^{2} (818.0/sq mi)
- Time zone: UTC+5:45 (Nepal Time)

Lumbini (Nepali: लुम्बिनी अञ्चल) was one of the fourteen zones of Nepal until the restructure of zones to provinces. Within the zone is the city of Lumbini, widely believed to be the birthplace of Siddhartha Gautama, the founder of Buddhism and renowned as a major Buddhist pilgrimage site. The zone's headquarters was Butwal.

== Administrative subdivisions ==
Lumbini was divided into six districts; since 2015 all five districts (plus the western half of Nawalparasi District) have been redesignated as part of Lumbini Province, while the eastern half of Nawalparasi District has been redesignated as part of Gandaki Province.

District	Type	Headquarters	Since 2015 part of Province
Arghakhanchi	Hill	Sandhikharka	Lumbini Province
Gulmi	Hill	Tamghas	Lumbini Province
Kapilvastu	Outer Terai	Taulihawa	Lumbini Province
Palpa	Hill	Tansen	Lumbini Province
Rupandehi	Outer Terai	Siddharthanagar (Bhairahawa)	Lumbini Province
Nawalparasi	Outer Terai	Parasi (Ramgram)	divided into Nawalpur District (Gandaki Province) and Nawalparasi(Bardaghat Susta Paschim) District (Lumbini Province)

== See also ==
- Development Regions of Nepal (Former)
- List of zones of Nepal (Former)
- List of districts of Nepal
- Tourism in Lumbini Province
