= Palpa 1 =

Parliamentary constituency in Lumbini Province, Nepal

- Parliamentary constituency
- Palpa 1 in Lumbini Province
- Province: Lumbini Province
- District: Palpa District

Current constituency
- Created: 1991
- Party: Nepal Communist Party
- Member of Parliament: Dal Bahadur Rana

Palpa 1 one of two parliamentary constituencies of Palpa District in Nepal. This constituency came into existence on the Constituency Delimitation Commission (CDC) report submitted on 31 August 2017.

== Incorporated areas ==
Palpa 1 incorporates Rampur Municipality, Nisdi Rural Municipality, Purbakhola Rural Municipality, Rambha Rural Municipality, wards 2-8 of Mathagadhi Rural Municipality, ward 5 of Tinau Rural Municipality and ward 8 of Tansen Municipality.

== Assembly segments ==
It encompasses the following Lumbini Provincial Assembly segment

- Palpa 1(A)
- Palpa 1(B)

== Members of Parliament ==
=== Parliament/Constituent Assembly ===
Election	Member	Party
1991	Kalu Ram Rana	Nepali Congress
1994	Dal Bahadur Rana Magar	CPN (Unified Marxist–Leninist)
March 1998	Dal Bahadur Rana Magar	CPN (Marxist–Leninist)
1999	Bhadra Bahadur Thapa	CPN (Unified Marxist–Leninist)
2008	Dal Bahadur Rana Magar	CPN (Unified Marxist–Leninist)
2013	Radha Krishna Kandel	CPN (Unified Marxist–Leninist)
2017	Dal Bahadur Rana Magar	CPN (Unified Marxist–Leninist)
May 2018	Dal Bahadur Rana Magar	Nepal Communist Party
March 2021	Dal Bahadur Rana Magar	CPN (Unified Marxist–Leninist)
2022	Narayan Prasad Acharya	CPN (Unified Marxist–Leninist)

=== Provincial Assembly ===
==== 1(A) ====
Election	Member	Party
2017	Yuba Raj Khanal	CPN (Unified Marxist-Leninist)
May 2018	Yuba Raj Khanal	Nepal Communist Party

==== 1(B) ====
Election	Member	Party
2017	Narayan Prasad Acharya	CPN (Unified Marxist-Leninist)
May 2018	Narayan Prasad Acharya	Nepal Communist Party

== Election results ==
=== Election in the 2020s ===
==== 2022 general election ====
Candidate	Party	Votes	%
Narayan Prasad Acharya	CPN (UML)	31,103	54.72
Gyan Bahadur Gaha	Nepali Congress	20,256	35.64
Bipin Kandel	Independent	2,863	5.04
Thamman Bahadur Budha Magar	Mongol National Organisation	2,045	3.60
Others		571	1.00
Total		56,838	100.00
Majority		10,847	
CPN (UML) hold			

=== Election in the 2010s ===
==== 2017 legislative elections ====
Party	Candidate	Votes
CPN (Unified Marxist–Leninist)	Dal Bahadur Rana Magar	32,549
Nepali Congress	Bijay Raj Ghimire	23,993
Mongol National Organisation	Tul Bir Darlami	1,086
Others		528
Invalid votes		1,274
Result	CPN (UML) hold	
Source: Election Commission

==== 2017 Nepalese provincial elections ====
===== 1(A) =====
Party	Candidate	Votes
CPN (Unified Marxist–Leninist)	Yuba Raj Khanal	17,851
Nepali Congress	Dev Raj Dhakal	13,660
Others		344
Invalid votes		482
Result	CPN (UML) gain	
Source: Election Commission

===== 1(B) =====
Party	Candidate	Votes
CPN (Unified Marxist–Leninist)	Narayan Prasad Acharya	14,765
Nepali Congress	Dan Bahadur Pachhai Chhetri	10,502
Mongol National Organisation	Lal Bahadur Darlami	1,039
Others		230
Invalid votes		557
Result	CPN (UML) gain	
Source: Election Commission

==== 2013 Constituent Assembly election ====
Party	Candidate	Votes
CPN (Unified Marxist–Leninist)	Radha Krishna Kandel	17,804
Nepali Congress	Sita Devi Devkota Pandey	11,958
UCPN (Maoist)	Tej Bahadur Sijali	2,790
Others		1,171
Result	CPN (UML) hold	
Source: NepalNews

=== Election in the 2000s ===
==== 2008 Constituent Assembly election ====
Party	Candidate	Votes
CPN (Unified Marxist–Leninist)	Dal Bahadur Rana Magar	19,185
Nepali Congress	Dhan Bahadur Rana	12,976
CPN (Maoist)	Tul Ram Gharti Magar	6,513
Others		1,745
Invalid votes		1,273
Result	CPN (UML) hold	
Source: Election Commission

=== Election in the 1990s ===
==== 1999 legislative elections ====
Party	Candidate	Votes
CPN (Unified Marxist–Leninist)	Bhadra Bahadur Thapa	19,477
Nepali Congress	Bijay Raj Ghimire	16,393
CPN (Marxist–Leninist)	Dal Bahadur Rana Magar	1,431
Others		1,220
Invalid votes		718
Result	CPN (UML) hold	
Source: Election Commission

==== 1994 legislative elections ====
Party	Candidate	Votes
CPN (Unified Marxist–Leninist)	Dal Bahadur Rana Magar	19,690
Nepali Congress	Kalu Ram Rana	14,815
Others		1,319
Result	CPN (UML) gain	
Source: Election Commission

==== 1991 legislative elections ====
Party	Candidate	Votes
Nepali Congress	Kalu Ram Rana	15,980
CPN (Unified Marxist–Leninist)		15,001
Result	Congress gain	

== See also ==
- List of parliamentary constituencies of Nepal
