= Rampur, Palpa =

Municipality in Lumbini Province, Nepal

Rampur Municipality रामपुर नगरपालिका
- Municipality
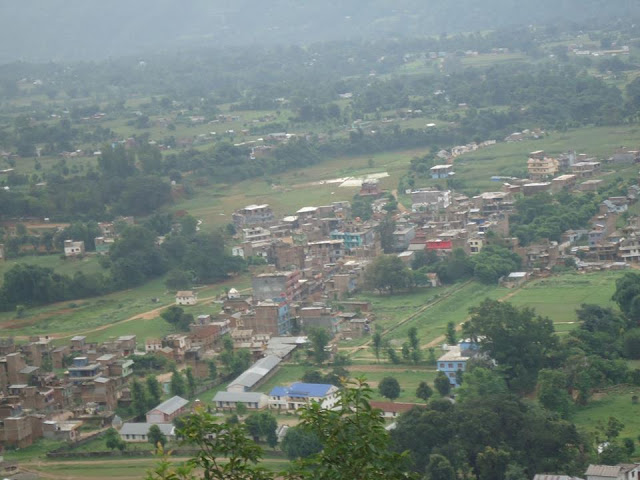

- Location in Nepal
- Coordinates: 27°50′N 83°54′E
- Country: Nepal
- Zone: Lumbini Zone
- District: Palpa District
- Province: Lumbini Province

Government
  - Mayor: Raman Bahadur Thapa (NC)
  - Deputy Mayor: Balkumari Thapa (NC)

Area
  - Total: 47.7 sq mi (123.5 km^{2})
- Elevation: 3,600 ft (1,100 m)

Population (2011)
  - Total: 35,396
  - Density: 740/sq mi (287/km^{2})
- Time zone: UTC+5:45 (NST)
- Postal code: 32502
- Website: rampurmun.gov.np

Rampur is a municipality in Palpa District in Lumbini Province of West southern Nepal. According to hindu mythology, Maharishi Vasistha taught Yogavasistha to lord Rama in the cave of Rampur. Rampur is 65 km northeast from the headquarter city Tansen. The valley is bounded by Syangja District in the north, Tanahun District in the northeast, and Nawalparasi District in the east. The popular religious river Kaligandaki disconnects the boundary in the northern part.

The municipality was established on 18 May 2014 by merging the existing Gadakot, Gegha, Khaliban and Darchha Village Development Committees. At the time of the 2011 Nepal census it had a population of 11,515 people living in 2733 individual households. Now, it has a population of 35,396 people living in 8,134 individual households after merging Gadakot, Gejha, Khaliban and Darchha VDCs.

== Tourism ==
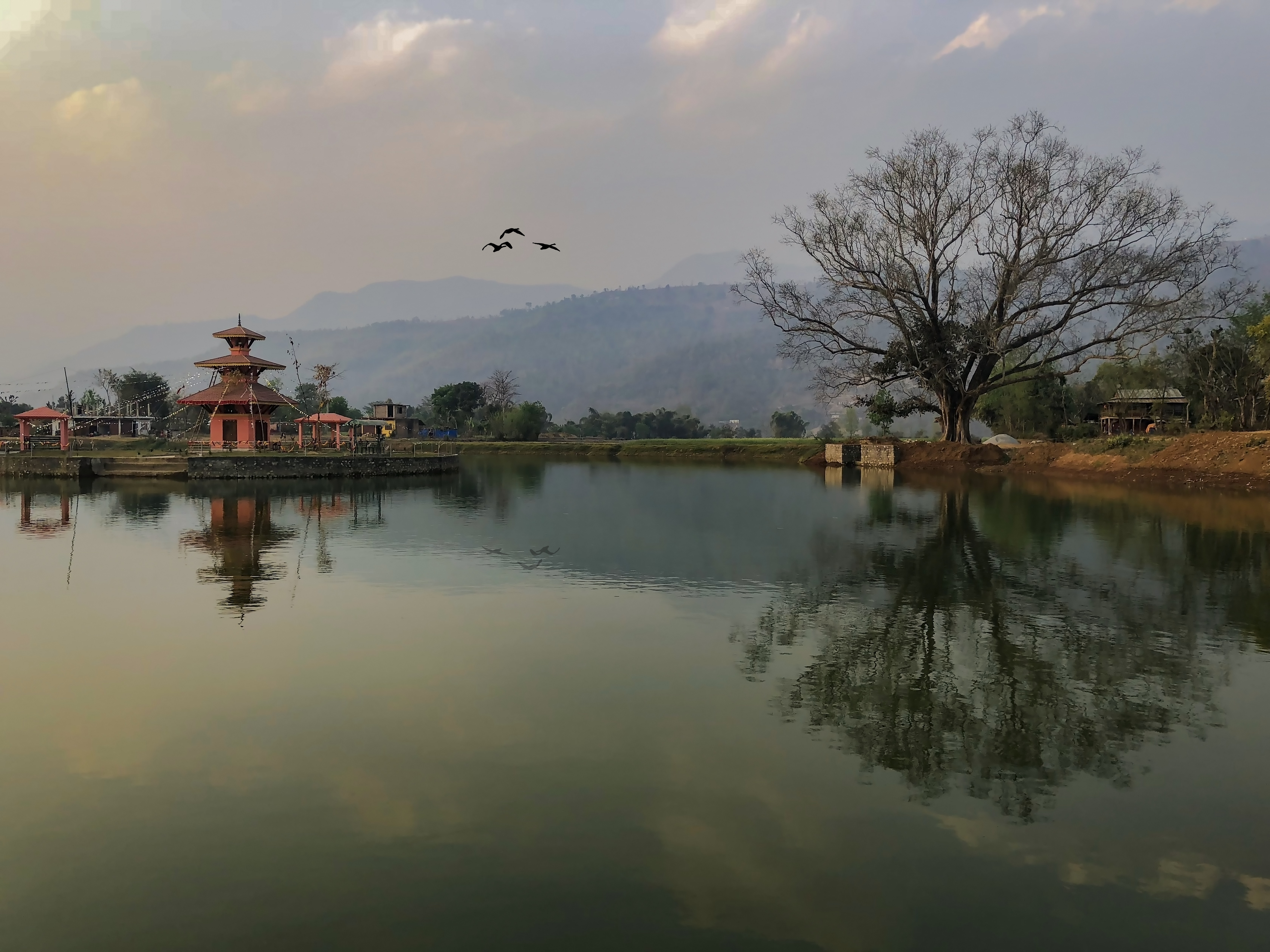

Kali Gandaki river flows through some villages of Rampur such as Gaudan, Dhakaldanda, Pyakluk at the edge of Talpokhara. Kali Gandaki itself is famous for rafting. Many tourists visit Rampur each year for rafting. Tourists can go for trekking as Rampur is surrounded by hills on all sides. The view of the mountain Makalu and Annapurna has added more beauty to Rampur. The tourism industry has not yet been developed because of a lack of resources. There is a widely known and famous place known as Talpokhara, which is a historical place from the point of view of tourism. In Talpokhara there is a temple and different parks to visit. If the temple and other resources are built-in the time that will be good for Rampur and as well as Nepal for economic development. At that temple Lord Shiva is worshiped in Mahashivaratri; most of the people go there to worship Lord Shiva as well as to visit Talpokhara.

== Political situation ==
Rampur is surrounded by Kali Gandaki at northern side, Wakamalang from east, Heklang from west and Sahalkot, Galdha, Siluwa, Ringneraha & Birkot at south. Talpokhara Temple (known as the second heaven by the locals) is situated at the northern side of the Rampur Municipality which is near from Kaligandaki river. It lies in ward number 9 of the Rampur Municipality.
