= Palpa 2 =

Parliamentary constituency in Lumbini Province, Nepal

- Parliamentary constituency
- Palpa 2 in Lumbini Province
- Province: Lumbini Province
- District: Palpa District

Current constituency
- Created: 1991
- Party: Rastriya Swatantra Party
- Member of Parliament: Madhav Bahadur Thapa

Palpa 2 one of two parliamentary constituencies of Palpa District in Nepal. This constituency came into existence on the Constituency Delimitation Commission (CDC) report submitted on 31 August 2017.

== Incorporated areas ==
Palpa 2 incorporates Rainadevi Chhahara Rural Municipality, Ribdikot Rural Municipality, Bangnaskali Rural Municipality, ward 1 of Mathagadhi Rural Municipality, ward 1–4 and 6 of Tinau Rural Municipality and wards 1–7 and 9–14 of Tansen Municipality.

== Assembly segments ==
It encompasses the following Lumbini Provincial Assembly segment

- Palpa 2(A)
- Palpa 2(B)

== Members of Parliament ==
=== Parliament/Constituent Assembly ===
Election	Member	Party
1991	Gambhir Jang Karki	Nepali Congress
1994	Som Prasad Pandey	CPN (Unified Marxist–Leninist)
2008	Lila Kumari Wagle	CPN (Maoist)
January 2009	Lila Kumari Wagle	UCPN (Maoist)
2013	Som Prasad Pandey	CPN (Unified Marxist–Leninist)
May 2018	Som Prasad Pandey	Nepal Communist Party
March 2021	Som Prasad Pandey	CPN (Unified Marxist–Leninist)
August 2021	Som Prasad Pandey	CPN (Unified Socialist)
2022	Thakur Prasad Gaire	CPN (Unified Marxist–Leninist)
2026	Madhav Bahadur Thapa	Rastriya Swatantra Party

=== Provincial Assembly ===
==== 2(A) ====
Election	Member	Party
2017	Puran Man Bajracharya	CPN (Unified Marxist-Leninist)
May 2018	Puran Man Bajracharya	Nepal Communist Party

==== 2(B) ====
Election	Member	Party
2017	Tula Ram Gharti Magar	CPN (Maoist Centre)
May 2018	Tula Ram Gharti Magar	Nepal Communist Party

== Election results ==
=== Election in the 2020s ===
==== 2022 general election ====
Candidate	Party	Votes	%
Thakur Prasad Gaire	CPN (UML)	28,645	46.05
Som Prasad Pandey	CPN (Unified Socialist)	24,899	40.03
Som Prasad Gaire	Rastriya Swatantra Party	5,349	8.60
Man Bahadur Darlami	Mongol National Organisation	1,604	2.58
Others		1,709	2.75
Total		62,206	100.00
Majority		3,746	
CPN (UML) gain			

=== Election in the 2010s ===
==== 2017 legislative elections ====
Party	Candidate	Votes
CPN (Unified Marxist–Leninist)	Som Prasad Pandey	34,899
Nepali Congress	Hari Prasad Nepal	24,554
Mongol National Organisation	Thaman Bahadur Budha Magar	1,005
Others		1,684
Invalid votes		1,596
Result	CPN (UML) hold	
Source: Election Commission

==== 2017 Nepalese provincial elections ====
===== 2(A) =====
Party	Candidate	Votes
CPN (Unified Marxist–Leninist)	Puran Man Bachracharya	18,042
Nepali Congress	Madhav Prasad Nepal	13,470
Others		1,940
Invalid votes		595
Result	CPN (UML) gain	
Source: Election Commission

===== 2(B) =====
Party	Candidate	Votes
CPN (Maoist Centre)	Tula Ram Gharti Magar	16,422
Nepali Congress	Ram Bahadur Karki	11,496
Others		1,093
Invalid votes		717
Result	Maoist Centre gain	
Source: Election Commission

==== 2013 Constituent Assembly election ====
Party	Candidate	Votes
CPN (Unified Marxist–Leninist)	Som Prasad Pandey	13,193
Nepali Congress	Bir Bahadur Rana	13,098
UCPN (Maoist)	Basanta Kumar Sharma	4,967
Rastriya Janamukti Party	Top Bahadur Aslami	1,221
Others		694
Result	CPN (UML) hold	
Source: NepalNews

=== Election in the 2000s ===
==== 2008 Constituent Assembly election ====
Party	Candidate	Votes
CPN (Maoist)	Lila Kumari Wagle	12,750
CPN (Unified Marxist–Leninist)	Som Prasad Pandey	10,929
Nepali Congress	Rajan Prasad Pant	10,820
Rastriya Janamukti Party	Top Bahadur Aslami	1,706
Others		1,381
Invalid votes		1,356
Result	Maoist gain	
Source: Election Commission

=== Election in the 1990s ===
==== 1999 legislative elections ====
Party	Candidate	Votes
CPN (Unified Marxist–Leninist)	Som Prasad Pandey	15,905
Nepali Congress	Rajan Prasad Pant	15,151
Rastriya Janamukti Party	Gore Bahadur Khapangi	3,542
CPN (Marxist–Leninist)	Som Nath Aryal	1,011
Others		635
Invalid votes		764
Result	CPN (UML) hold	
Source: Election Commission

==== 1994 legislative elections ====
Party	Candidate	Votes
CPN (Unified Marxist–Leninist)	Som Prasad Pandey	17,851
Nepali Congress	Gambhir Jang Karki	12,147
Rastriya Prajatantra Party	Hari Bahadur Thapa	1,744
Prajatantrik Lok Dal	Devendra Raj Pandey	1,116
Rastriya Janamukti Party	Kheman Singh Rana	42
Result	CPN (UML) gain	
Source: Election Commission

==== 1991 legislative elections ====
Party	Candidate	Votes
Nepali Congress	Gambhir Jang Karki	17,248
CPN (Unified Marxist–Leninist)		13,282
Result	Congress gain	

== See also ==
- List of parliamentary constituencies of Nepal
