= Bakamalang =

Coordinates: 27.8302°N 84.0062°E

Bakamalang वाकामलाङ Wakamalan/Malang
- Village Development Committee
- Interactive map of Bakamalang
- Country: Nepal
- Zone: Lumbini Zone
- District: Palpa District

Population (1991)
  - Total: 2,861
- Time zone: UTC+5:45 (Nepal Time)

Bakamalang is a village development committee in Palpa District in the Lumbini Zone of southern Nepal. At the time of the 1991 Nepal census it had a population of 2861 people living in 472 individual households. It is surrounded by Rakuwa in the northeast, Ruching in the southeast, Sahalkot in the southwest and Gadakot in the northwest. The northeast border of Bakamalang village development committee resembles the Gandaki River.
