= Rambha Rural Municipality =

Rambha Rural Municipality रम्भा गाउँपालिका!!!
- Gaunpalika
- Location in Nepal
- Coordinates: 27.853558°N 83.657792°E
- Country: Nepal
- Province: Lumbini Province
- District: Palpa District

Area
  - Total: 94.1 km^{2} (36.3 sq mi)

Population
  - Total: 20,190
  - Density: 215/km^{2} (556/sq mi)
- Time zone: UTC+5:45 (Nepal Time)
- Website: rambhamun.gov.np

Rambha Rural Municipality (Nepali :रम्भा गाउँपालिका) is a Gaunpalika in Palpa District in Lumbini Province of Nepal. On 12 March 2017, the government of Nepal implemented a new local administrative structure, with the implementation of the new local administrative structure, VDCs have been replaced with municipal and Village Councils. Rambha is one of these 753 local units.

== Political situation ==
Rambha Rural Municipality is divided into 5 Wards. It is surrounded by Syangja District on the north, Rampur Municipality on the east, Bagnaskali Rural Municipality and Mathagadi Rural Municipality on the west and Purbakhola Rural Municipality on the south. Pipaldada is its headquarter.
