= Thakur Prasad Gaire =

Nepali politician

- ठाकुर प्रसाद गैरे

Chairperson of the Monitoring and Evaluation Committee on the Implementation of Directive Principles, Policies and Obligations of the State
- In office 2024 – 5 March 2026

Member of the House of Representatives
- In office 26 December 2022 – 5 March 2026
- Preceded by: Som Prasad Pandey
- Succeeded by: Madhav Bahadur Thapa
- Constituency: Palpa 2

Personal details
- Born: 19 May 1968 (age 58) Palpa, Nepal
- Party: CPN (UML)
- Occupation: Politician

Thakur Prasad Gaire (Nepali: ठाकुर प्रसाद गैरे) is a Nepalese politician belonging to the CPN (UML). He served as a member of the 2nd Federal Parliament of Nepal and was the Chairperson of the Monitoring and Evaluation Committee on the Implementation of Directive Principles, Policies and Obligations of the State.

== Political career ==
Gaire began his political journey through student politics, serving as the president of the All Nepal National Free Students Union (ANNFSU). In the 2022 Nepalese general election, he was elected to the House of Representatives from Palpa 2, defeating Som Prasad Pandey of the CPN (Unified Socialist) by a margin of 3,966 votes.

In the 2026 Nepalese general election (2082 BS), Gaire sought re-election from the same constituency but was defeated by Madhav Bahadur Thapa of the Rastriya Swatantra Party.

== Electoral history ==
=== 2026 general election: Palpa-2 ===
Party	Candidate	Votes	%
Rastriya Swatantra Party	Madhav Bahadur Thapa	26,736	48.15
Nepali Congress	Himal Datta Shrestha	12,992	23.40
CPN (UML)	Thakur Prasad Gaire	10,503	18.91
CPN (Unified Socialist)	Som Prasad Pandey	5,288	9.54
Majority		13,744	

=== 2022 general election: Palpa-2 ===
Party	Candidate	Votes
CPN (UML)	Thakur Prasad Gaire	27,737
CPN (Unified Socialist)	Som Prasad Pandey	23,771
Majority		3,966
