= Yamgha =

Coordinates: 27°55′N 83°35′E

Yamgha यम्घा
- Village development committee
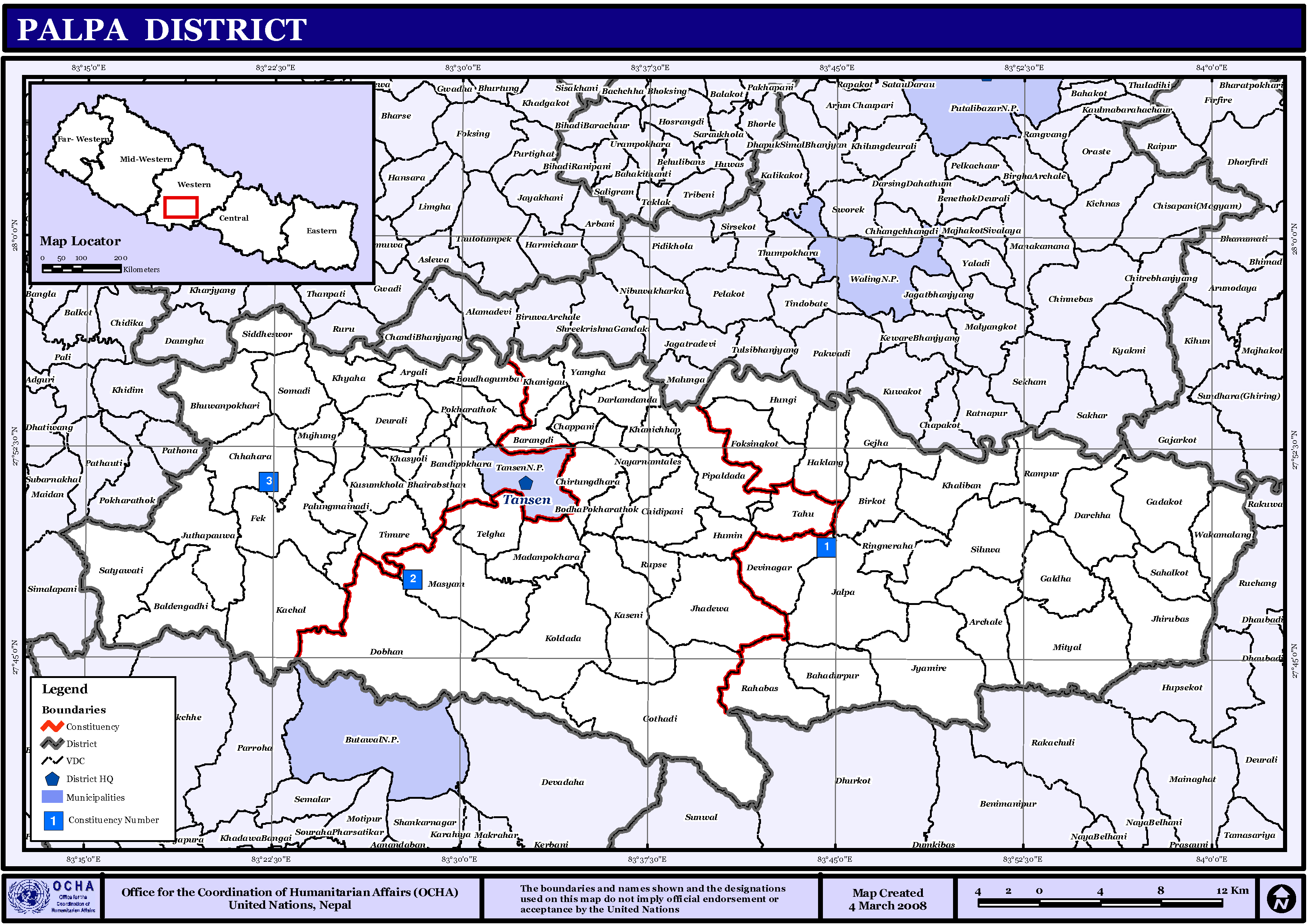
- Map of the village development committees in Palpa District

- Location in Nepal
- Country: Nepal
- Zone: Lumbini Zone
- District: Palpa District

Population (2011)
  - Total: 3,573
- Time zone: UTC+5:45 (Nepal Time)

Yamgha is a village development committee in Palpa District in the Lumbini Zone of southern Nepal. At the time of the 2011 Nepal census it had a population of 3,573 people living in 901 individual households.
