= Telgha =

Telgha तेल्घा
- Village development committee
- Location in Nepal
- Coordinates: 27°49′30″N 83°30′56″E
- Country: Nepal
- Zone: Lumbini Zone
- District: Palpa District

Population (1991)
  - Total: 3,051
- Time zone: UTC+5:45 (Nepal Time)

Telgha is a village development committee in Palpa District in the Lumbini Zone of southern Nepal. At the time of the 1991 Nepal census it had a population of 3051 people living in 577 individual households.
