= Khaliban =

Khaliban खालीवन
- Location in Nepal
- Coordinates: 27.86°N 83.83°E
- Country: Nepal
- Zone: Lumbini Zone
- District: Palpa District

Population (1991)
  - Total: 2,272
- Time zone: UTC+5:45 (Nepal Time)

Khaliban is a town in Rampur Municipality in Palpa District in the Lumbini Zone of southern Nepal. The municipality was established on 18 May 2014 by merging the existing Gadakot, Gegha, Khaliban, Darchha village development committee. At the time of the 1991 Nepal census it had a population of 2272 people living in 399 individual households.
