= Bandi Pokhara =

Coordinates: 27°53′N 83°30′E

Bandi Pokhara बन्दी पोखरा गाविस
- Village development committee
- Interactive map of Bandi Pokhara
- Country: Nepal
- Zone: Lumbini Zone
- District: Palpa District

Population (1991)
  - Total: 2,913
- Time zone: UTC+5:45 (Nepal Time)

Bandi Pokhara is a village development committee in Palpa District in the Lumbini Zone of southern Nepal. At the time of the 1991 Nepal census it had a population of 2913 people living in 845 individual households.
