= Koldanda =

Koldanda कोलडाँडा
- Village development committee
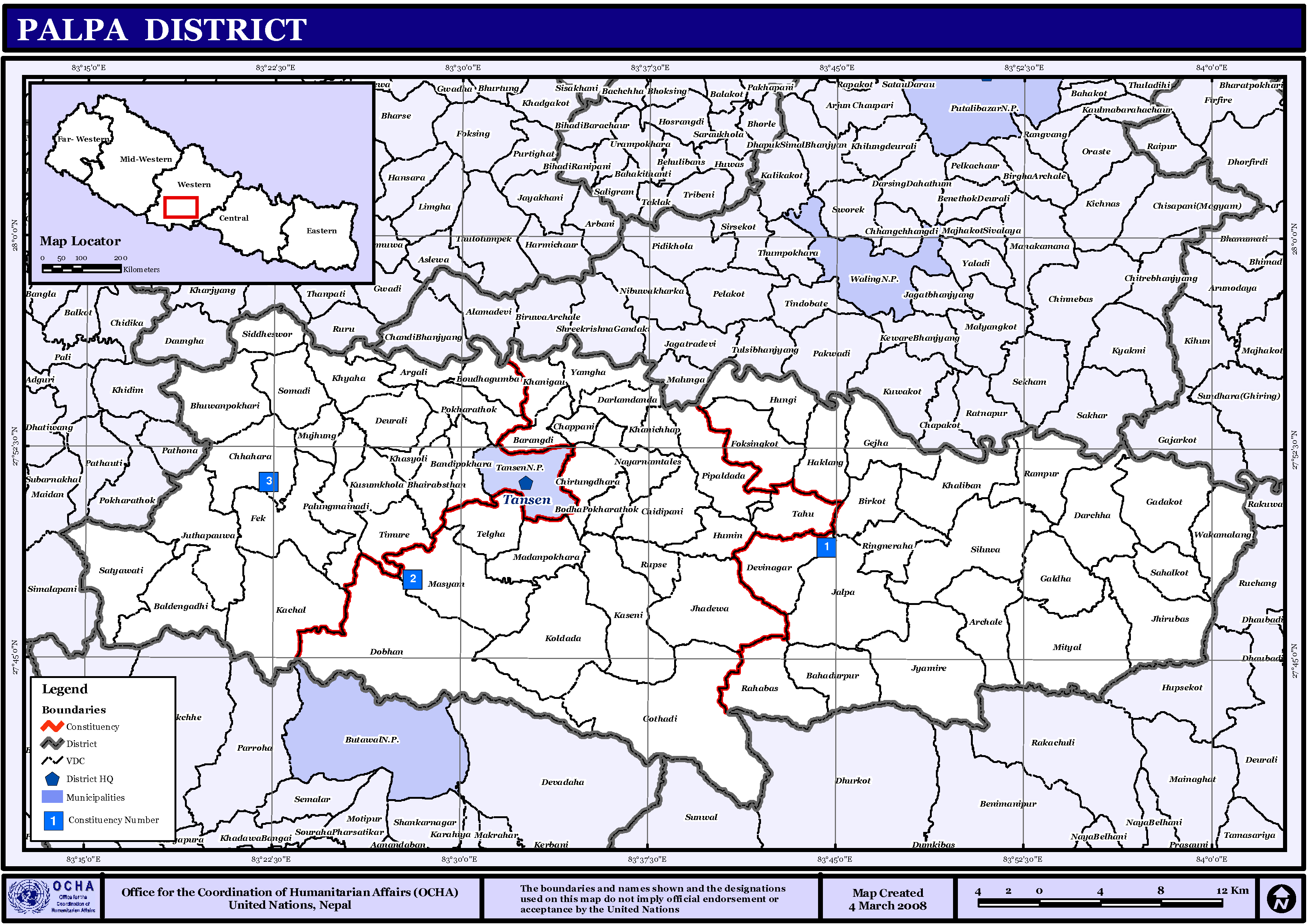

- Location in Nepal
- Coordinates: 27.76°N 83.57°E
- Country: Nepal
- Zone: Lumbini Zone
- District: Palpa District

Population (2011)
  - Total: 3,865
- Time zone: UTC+5:45 (Nepal Time)

Koldanda is a village development committee in Palpa District in the Lumbini Zone of southern Nepal. At the time of the 1991 Nepal census it had a population of 3,865 people living in 661 individual households.
