= Romandi =

Village in Nepal

Romandi is a village in Siluwa village development committee of Palpa, Nepal.
