= Tahu, Palpa =

Tahu ताहुँ Tahoon
- Village very development committee
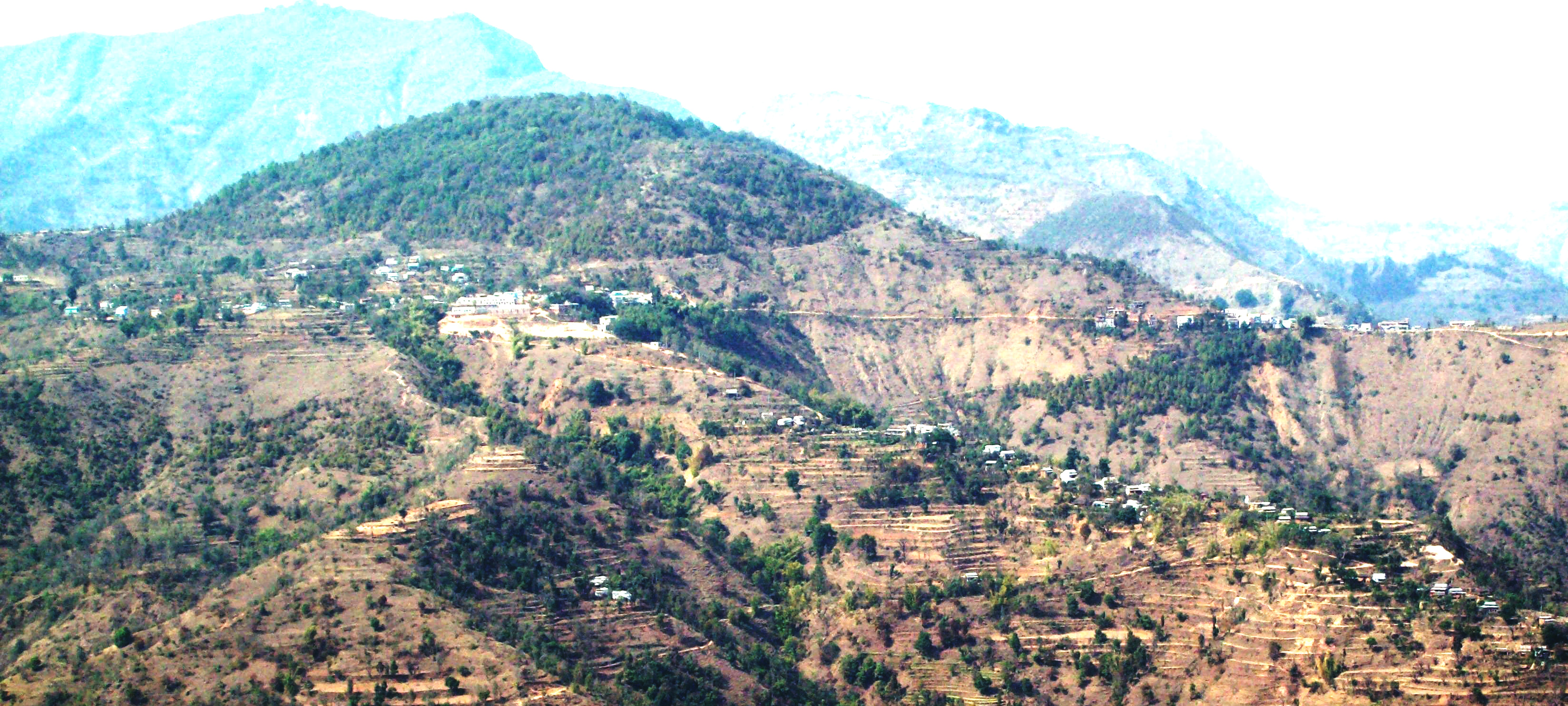

- Location in Nepal palpa
- Coordinates: 27.84°N 83.73°E
- Zone: Lumbini Zone
- District: Palpa District
- Established: palpa

Population (1991)
  - Total: 3,776
- Time zone: UTC+5:45 (Nepal Time)
- Area code: 075

Tahoon is a village very development committee in Palpa District in the Lumbini Zone of southern Nepal. At the time of the 1991 Nepal census it had a population of 3776.

== Administration ==
In 2017, as part of the federal restructuring of Nepal, the existing Village Development Committees (VDCs) were dissolved. The area of Tahu was incorporated into the newly established Rambha Rural Municipality (Rambha Gaunpalika), which now serves as the local government for the region.

Tahoon Village is 32 km east from the district headquarters Tansen and is linked by a 24' Black Top road motorable road which diverts from Aryabhanjyang in the Siddhartha Highway. The total distance to place from Aryabhanjyang is about 14 km.

Tahoon is situated within a mountainous landscape consisting of forests and agricultural land. The Village Development Committee (VDC) offers views of the Dhaulagiri, Annapurna, and Machhapuchhare mountain ranges. Local natural sites include Hatti Lekh, Rambha forest, Bakumgadhi, Rimigha Lekh, and the Purba Khola valley. Cultural landmarks in the area include the Rambha Devi and Jalpa Devi temples, which attract worshippers from surrounding regions during full-moon days and religious festivals.

== Transport ==
Buses and jeeps are the dominant form of transportation. Private operators offer service to various destinations. Many people are using motorcycles as private means of transport. There are direct bus services to Tansen, Butwal, Kathmandu and Rampur.

== Demographics ==
While the 1991 census recorded a population of 3,776, subsequent national censuses have reflected demographic shifts in the region. The area is now part of the broader Rambha Rural Municipality, which encompasses several former VDCs and reflects ongoing demographic changes in the Palpa District.

== Geography and climate ==
The geography of Tahu is characterized by the foothills of the Mahabharat Range. The area features a subtropical to temperate climate. The Purba Khola valley provides irrigation for lower-altitude terraced fields, while higher elevations, such as Rimigha Lekh and Hatti Lekh, are covered by subtropical broadleaf forests. From these elevations, the Dhaulagiri, Annapurna, and Machhapuchhre massifs are visible.

== Education ==
Tahu is center of education for nearby village areas. There is a campus affiliated to Tribhuwan University.

1. Rambha Multiple Campus, Rambha-5
2. Rambha Higher Secondary School, Rambha-5
3. Rambha Devi English Boarding School, Rambha-5 (Deurali)
4. shree pasupati pravi school (dhobadi)
5. shree janta pravi school (thak khola)

== Agriculture ==
Agriculture is the main occupation in the local economy. Most of the farmers have been subsistence farmers but lately many are also engaged in producing cash-crops which is sold in the Local markets.

Paddy, wheat, maize, millet and legumes are the principal crops of the region. The production of rice and wheat crops in the same year is the predominant cropping pattern in the area.

The more fertile irrigated fields for those crops are at valley bottoms and foothills whereas the non irrigated terraces are at higher altitude. Ginger grown in the terraced land is the one of main cash crop. The other produces are oranges and green vegetables. In the recent years many farmers have also started coffee production. Coffee is being cultivated between 700 m to 1300 m above sea level in fertile, loam to infertile gravel mixed soil in this parts of Rambha Gaupalika. This shift towards coffee cultivation aligns with regional initiatives in Palpa District to promote the cultivation of Arabica coffee.

== Places of interest ==
1. Tahoon bazaar
2. Rambha Devi Temple
3. Dhobadi
4. Jalpa Devi Temple
5. Nachan Danda
6. Bakumgadhi

== Gallery ==
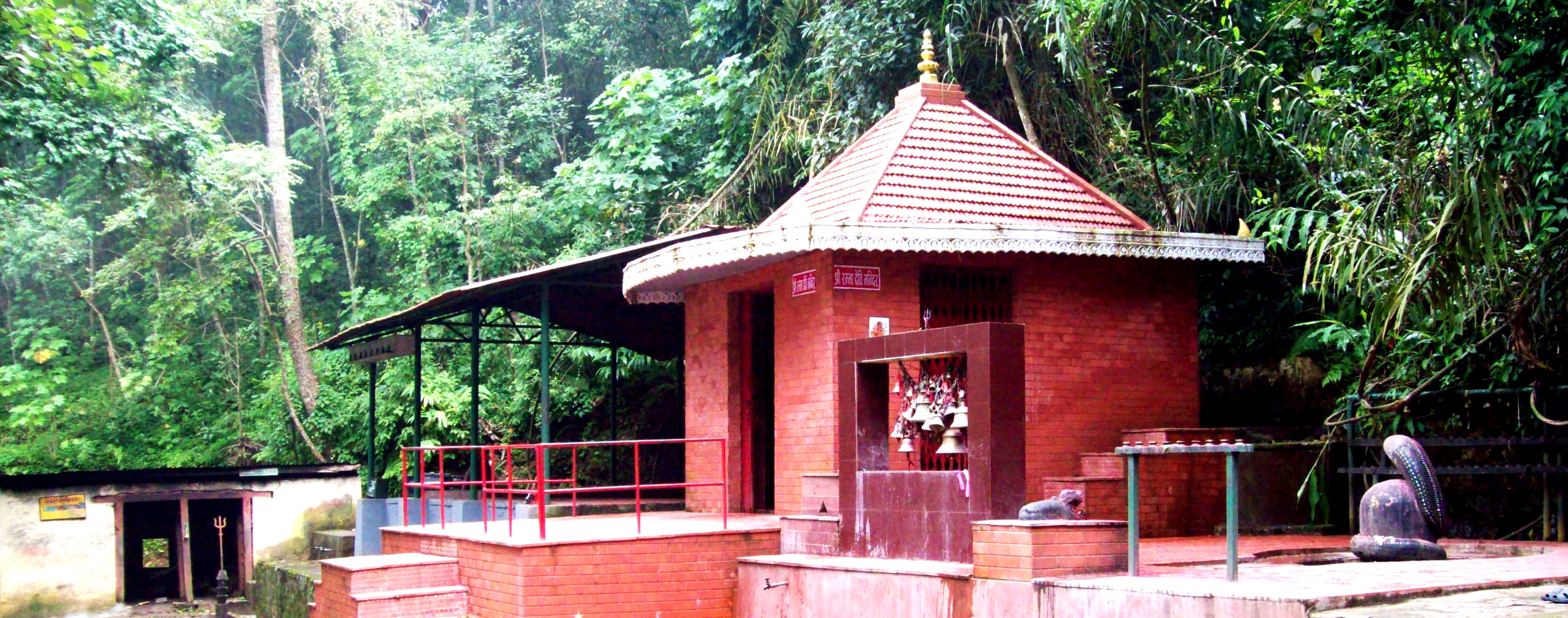
Rambh Devi Temple

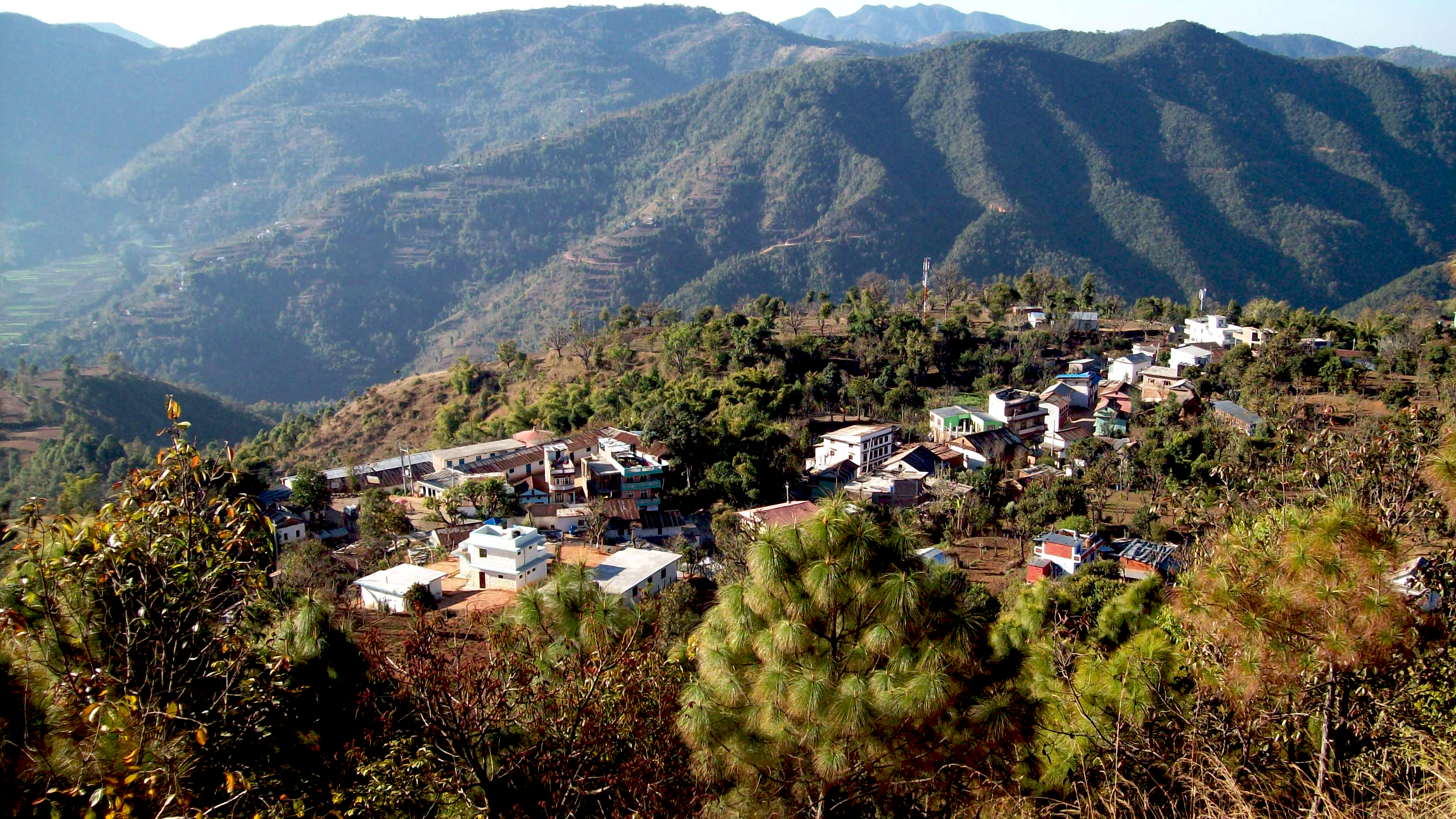
Tahu

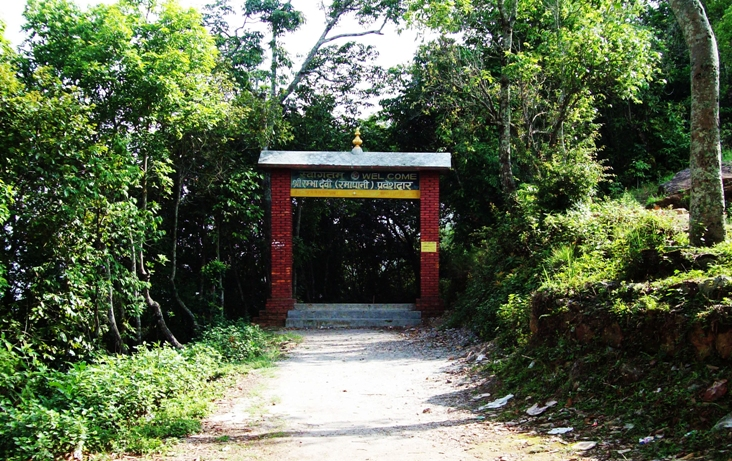
Nachan Dada(Gate of Rambha Devi Temple)
