= Kachal =

Kachal कचल
- Village development committee
- Location in Nepal
- Coordinates: 27.78°N 83.39°E
- Country: Nepal
- Zone: Lumbini Zone
- District: Palpa District

Population (1991)
  - Total: 3,353
- Time zone: UTC+5:45 (Nepal Time)

Kachal is a village development committee in Palpa District in the Lumbini Zone of southern Nepal. At the 1991 Nepal census it had a population of 3353.
