= Darchha =

- Location in Nepal
- Coordinates: 27.84°N 83.92°E
- Country: Nepal
- Zone: Lumbini Zone
- District: Palpa District

Population (1991)
  - Total: 5,511
- Time zone: UTC+5:45 (Nepal Time)

Darchha is a town that is located in Rampur Municipality, in Palpa District, in the Lumbini Zone of southern Nepal. The municipality was established on 18 May 2014 by merging the existing Gadakot, Gegha, Khaliban, Darchha village development committee. At the time of the 1991 Nepal census it had a population of 5511 people living in 986 individual households.
