= Madanpokhara =

Madanpokhara मदनपोखरा
- Village development committee
- Location in Nepal
- Coordinates: 27.81°N 83.56°E
- Country: Nepal
- Zone: Lumbini Zone
- District: Palpa District

Population (1991)
  - Total: 6,269
- Time zone: UTC+5:45 (Nepal Time)

Madanpokhara is a village development committee in Palpa District in the Lumbini Zone of southern Nepal. At the time of the 1991 Nepal census it had a population of 6269 people living in 1148 individual households. Madi radio and madi television and radio madanpokhara and lumbini medical college. Along with Bhandari corporation, Padam Bhandari and organization, Padam and company and c foundation. Pathak food. It is kokal communu. Tansen 7,8&9.

== Media ==
To Promote local culture Madanpokhara has one FM radio station Radio Madanpokhara - 106.9 MHz Which is a Community radio Station.
