= Palung Mainadi =

Coordinates: 27°51′N 83°25′E

Palung Mainadi पालुङ मैनादी
- Village development committee
- Interactive map of Palung Mainadi
- Country: Nepal
- Zone: Lumbini Zone
- District: Palpa District

Population (1991)
  - Total: 2,675
- Time zone: UTC+5:45 (Nepal Time)

Palung Mainadi is a village development committee in Palpa District in the Lumbini Zone of southern Nepal. At the time of the 1991 Nepal census it had a population of 2675 people living in 445 individual households.
