= Khaniban =

Khaniban खानीबन
- Village development committee
- Country: Nepal
- Zone: Lumbini Zone
- District: Palpa District

Population (1991)
  - Total: 2,140
- Time zone: UTC+5:45 (Nepal Time)

Khaniban is a village development committee in Palpa District in the Lumbini Zone of southern Nepal. At the time of the 1991 Nepal census it had a population of 2140 people living in 402 individual households.
