= Mujhung =

Mujhung मुझुङ
- Rainadevi Chhahara
- Location in Nepal
- Coordinates: 27.88°N 83.40°E
- Country: Nepal
- Zone: Lumbini Zone
- District: Palpa District

Population (1991)
  - Total: 2,466
- Time zone: UTC+5:45 (Nepal Time)

Mujhung is a village development committee in Palpa District in the Lumbini Zone of southern Nepal. At the time of the 1991 Nepal census it had a population of 2466 people living in 462 individual households.
