= Narayan Prasad Acharya =

Nepali politician

- नारायण प्रसाद आचार्य

Member of Parliament, Pratinidhi Sabha
- Incumbent
- Assumed office 26 December 2022
- Preceded by: Dal Bahadur Rana
- Constituency: Palpa 1

Personal details
- Born: 25 December 1969 (age 56) Palpa District
- Party: CPN (UML)
- Parents: Dilli Prasad Acharya (father); Jema Kanti Acharya (mother)

Narayan Prasad Acharya is a Nepalese politician, belonging to the CPN (UML) currently serving as a member of the 2nd Federal Parliament of Nepal. In the 2022 Nepalese general election, Narayan Prasad Acharya, was elected from the Palpa 1 (constituency) with 31,103 votes .
