= Bhuwan Pokhari =

Coordinates: 27°55′N 83°20′E

np Narayan paudyal
- Village development committee
- Interactive map of np
- Country: Nepal
- Zone: Lumbini Zone
- District: Palpa District

Population (1991)
  - Total: 5,113
- Time zone: UTC+5:45 (Nepal Time)

Bhuwan Pokhari is a village development committee in Palpa District in the Lumbini Zone of southern Nepal. At the time of the 1991 Nepal census it had a population of 5113 people living in 969 individual households.
