= Somadi =

Village development committee in Lumbini Zone, Nepal

somadi सोमादी
- Village development committee
- Location in Nepal
- Coordinates: 27.91°N 83.39°E
- Country: Nepal
- Zone: Lumbini Zone
- District: Palpa District

Population (1991)
  - Total: 2,671
- Time zone: UTC+5:45 (Nepal Time)

Somadi is a village development committee in Palpa District in the Lumbini Zone of southern Nepal. At the time of the 1991 Nepal census it had a population of 2671 people living in 502 individual households.
