= Chhahara =

Chhahara छहरा
- Village development committee
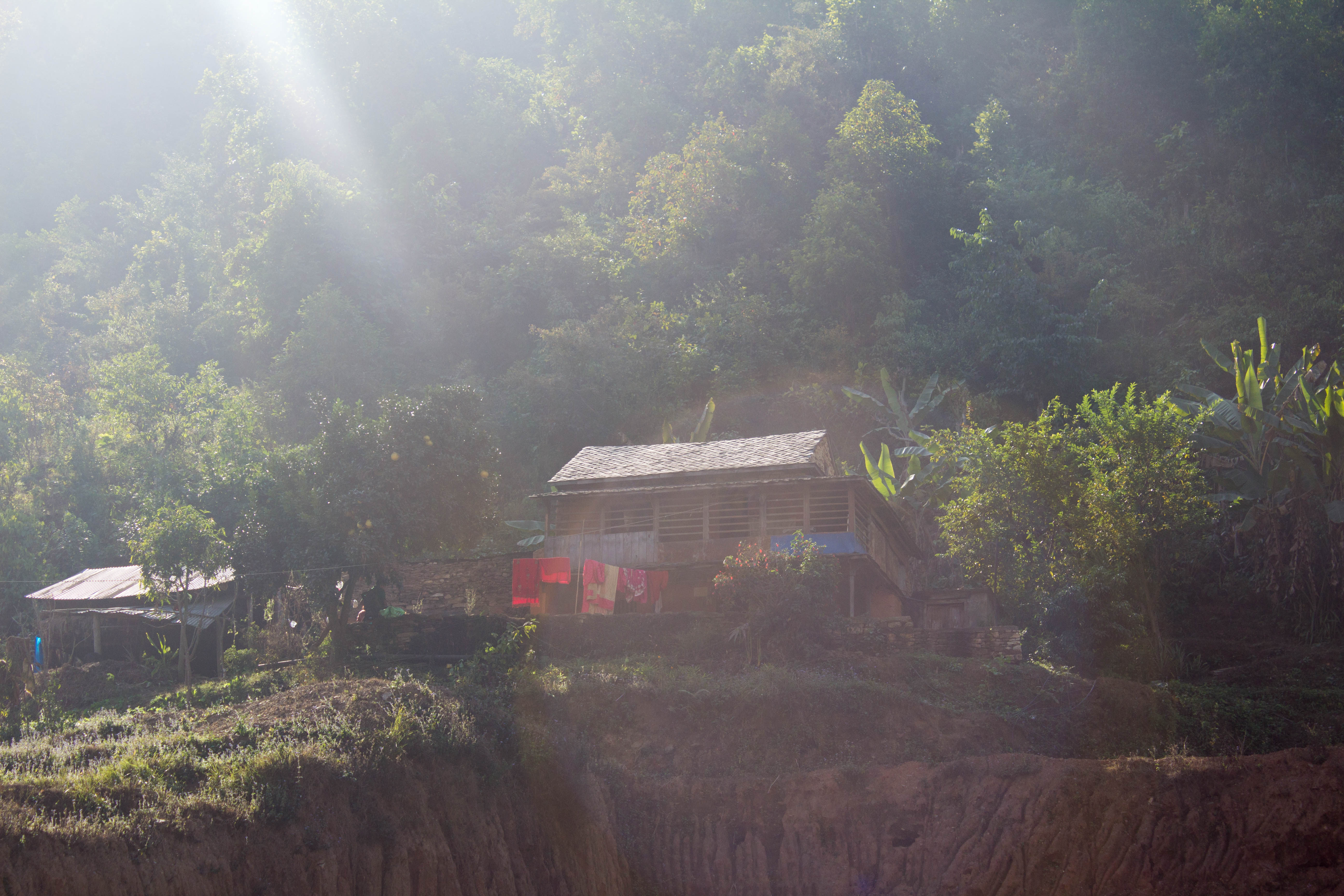
- Traditional house in Nepal

- Location in Nepal
- Coordinates: 27.87°N 83.36°E
- Country: Nepal
- Zone: Lumbini Zone
- District: Palpa District

Population (1991)
  - Total: 4,610
- Time zone: UTC+5:45 (Nepal Time)
- Area code: 32500

Chhahara is a village development committee in Palpa District in the Lumbini Zone of southern Nepal. At the time of the 1991 Nepal census it had a population of 4610 people living in 879 individual households.
