= Nayarnamtales =

Nayarnamtales नायरनमतलेस
- Village development committee
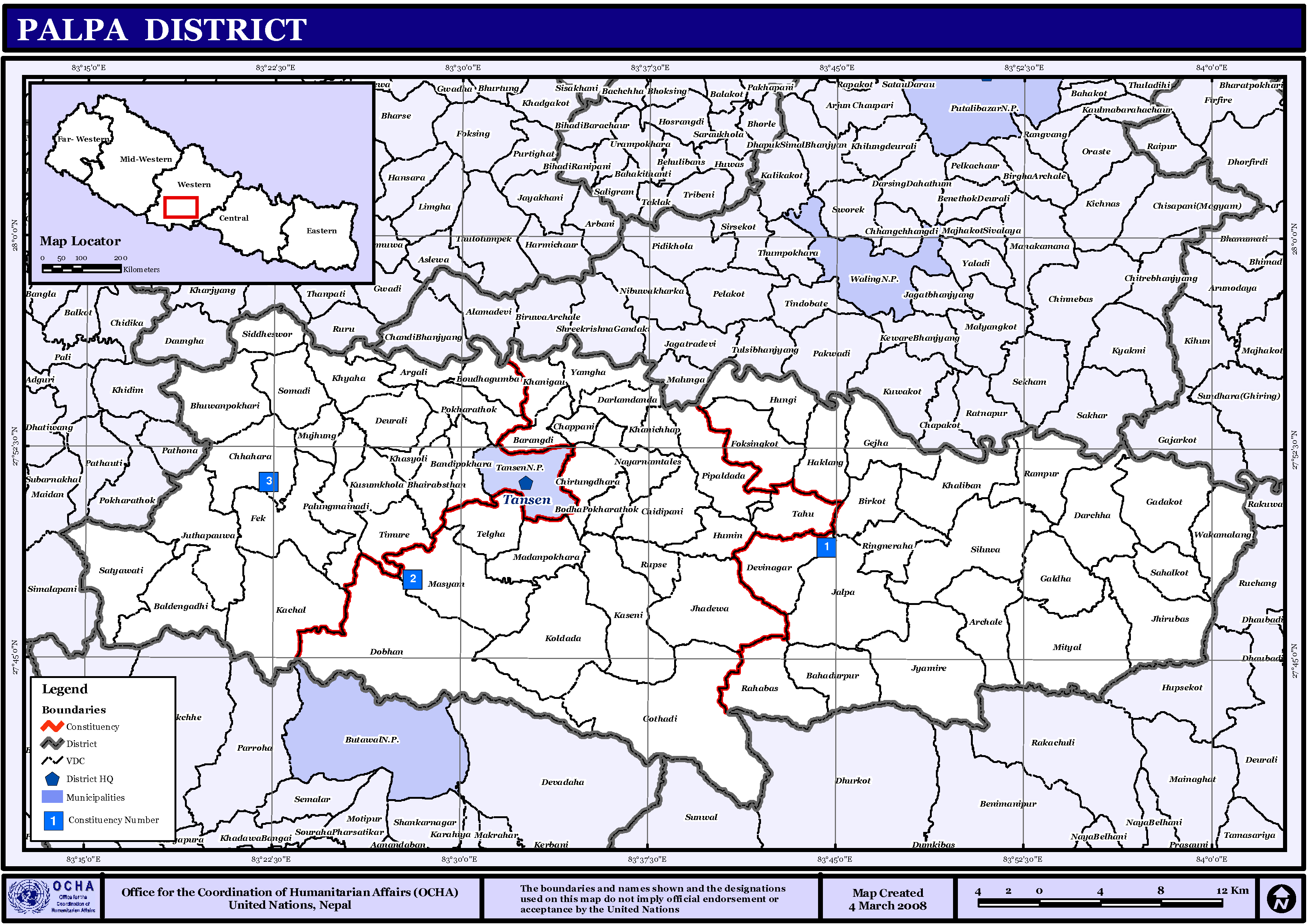
- Map of the village development committees in Palpa District

- Location in Nepal
- Coordinates: 27.865366°N 83.618879°E
- Country: Nepal
- Zone: Lumbini Zone
- District: Palpa District

Population (2011)
  - Total: 2,153
- Time zone: UTC+5:45 (Nepal Time)

Nayarnamtales is a village development committee in Palpa District in the Lumbini Zone of southern Nepal. At the time of the 2011 Nepal census it had a population of 2,153 people living in 534 individual households.
