= Gejha =

Coordinates: 27°51′N 83°46′E

Gejha गेँझा
- Interactive map of Gejha
- Country: Nepal
- Zone: Lumbini Zone
- District: Palpa District

Population (1991)
  - Total: 4,804
- Time zone: UTC+5:45 (Nepal Time)

Gejha is a town in the Rampur Municipality of the Palpa District in the Lumbini Zone of southern Nepal. This municipality was established on 18 May 2014 by merging the existing Gadakot, Gejha, Khaliban, and Darchha village development committee. At the time of the 1991 Nepal census, it had a population of 4804 people, living in 851 individual households. In 2015, the population of Gejha stood at 5,597.
