= Baughapokharathok =

BoughaPokharathok बौघापोखराथोक
- Village development committee
- Interactive map of BoughaPokharathok
- Coordinates: 27.8833°N 83.5333°E
- Country: Nepal
- Zone: Lumbini Zone
- District: Palpa District

Population (1991)
  - Total: 2,238
- Time zone: UTC+5:45 (Nepal Time)

BoughaPokharathok is a village development committee in Palpa District in the Lumbini Zone of southern Nepal. At the time of the 1991 Nepal census it had a population of 2238 people living in 432 individual households.
