= Rahabas =

Mathagadhi-7, Rahabas Badur
- Village development committee
- Location in Nepal
- Coordinates: 27.74°N 83.70°E
- Country: Nepal
- Zone: Lumbini Zone
- District: Palpa District

Population (1991)
  - Total: 2,109
- Time zone: UTC+5:45 (Nepal Time)

Mathagadi is a rural municipality in Palpa District in Lumbini Province of southern Nepal. At the time of the 1991 Nepal census it had a population of 2109 people living in 325 individual households.
