= Gothadi =

Gothadi गोठाडी
- Village development committee
- Location in Nepal
- Coordinates: 27.72°N 83.63°E
- Country: Nepal
- Zone: Lumbini Zone
- District: Palpa District

Population (1991)
  - Total: 4,797
- Time zone: UTC+5:45 (Nepal Time)

Gothadi is a village development committee in Palpa District in the Lumbini Zone of southern Nepal. At the time of the 1991 Nepal census it had a population of 4797 people living in 750 individual households.
