= Phoksingkot =

Phoksingkot फोक्सिङकोट
- Village development committee
- Location in Nepal
- Coordinates: 27.88°N 83.70°E
- Country: Nepal
- Zone: Lumbini Zone
- District: Palpa District

Population (1991)
  - Total: 4,528
- Time zone: UTC+5:45 (Nepal Time)

Phoksingkot is a village development committee in Palpa District in the Lumbini Zone of southern Nepal. At the time of the 1991 Nepal census, it had a population of 4,528 people living in 774 individual households.
