= Barandi =

Coordinates: 27°53′N 83°32′E

Barangdi BAGNASKALI RURAL MUNICIPALITY 08 Ghimiredanda
- Nickname: Ghimiredanda(local name)
- Interactive map of Barangdi
- Country: Nepal
- Zone: Lumbini Zone
- District: Palpa District

Population (1991)
  - Total: 2,475
- Time zone: UTC+5:45 (Nepal Time)

Barangdi is a village development committee in Palpa District in the Lumbini Zone of southern Nepal. At the time of the 1991 Nepal census it had a population of 2475 people living in 470 individual households.
