= Kusumkhola =

Coordinates: 27°51′N 83°25′E

Kusumkhola कुसुमखोला
- Village development committee
- Interactive map of Kusumkhola
- Country: Nepal
- Zone: Lumbini Zone
- District: Palpa District

Population (1991)
  - Total: 1,809
- Time zone: UTC+5:45 (Nepal Time)

Kusumkhola is a village development committee in Palpa District in the Lumbini Zone of southern Nepal. At the time of the 1991 Nepal census it had a population of 1809 people living in 349 individual households.
