= Satpokharee =

सातपोखरी (Satpokharee) Bhate Pokharee
- Village
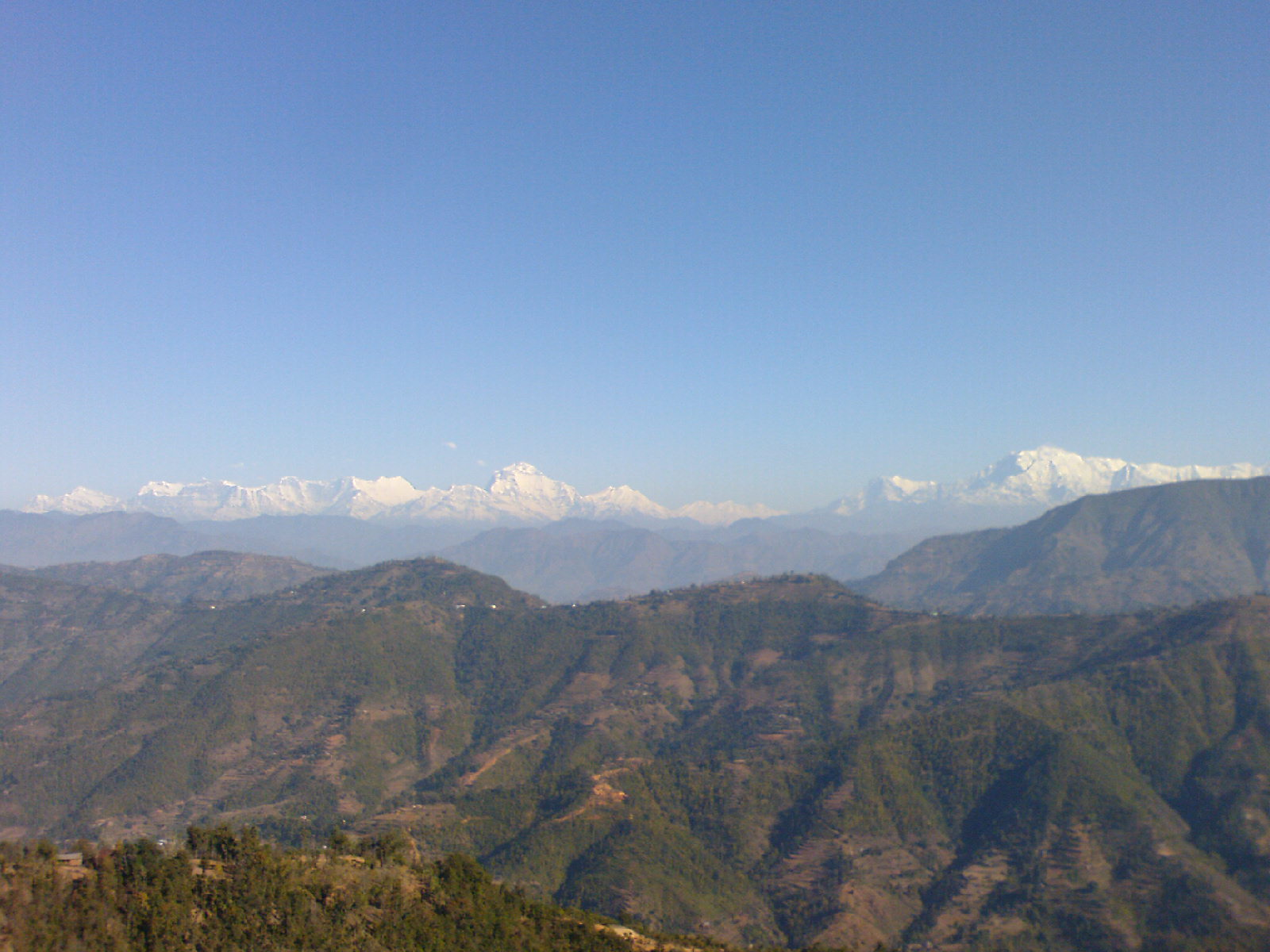
- A view of Dhaulagiri from the Satpokharee valley

- Location in Nepal
- Coordinates: 27.7577°N 83.6643°E
- Country: Nepal
- Province: Lumbini Province
- District: Palpa District

Population (2021)
  - Total: 200
  - Density: 3/km^{2} (7.8/sq mi)
- 200 people living in 40 individual households. 15 Houses of Vishokorma (B.K.) & 25 Houses of Magar. religious 100% Hindu
- Time zone: UTC+5:45 (Nepal Time)
- Area code(s): STD & Area Code:-75

Satpokharee is a village in the Mathagadi Gaunpalika (माथागढी गाउँपालिका) Gothadi ward no. 6 Palpa District in the Lumbini Province of southern Nepal. Population of 200 people living in 40 individual households.

== Geography ==
Satpokharee is 25.6 km south-east of the headquarters city Tansen. The valley is bounded by Rahabas V.D.C. in the east, Gothadi in the south and Jhadewa V.D.C. in the north. The popular River Jhumsa khola connects with the Thadekhola (Rahabskhola) orgn.source started in northern part.

== Development ==
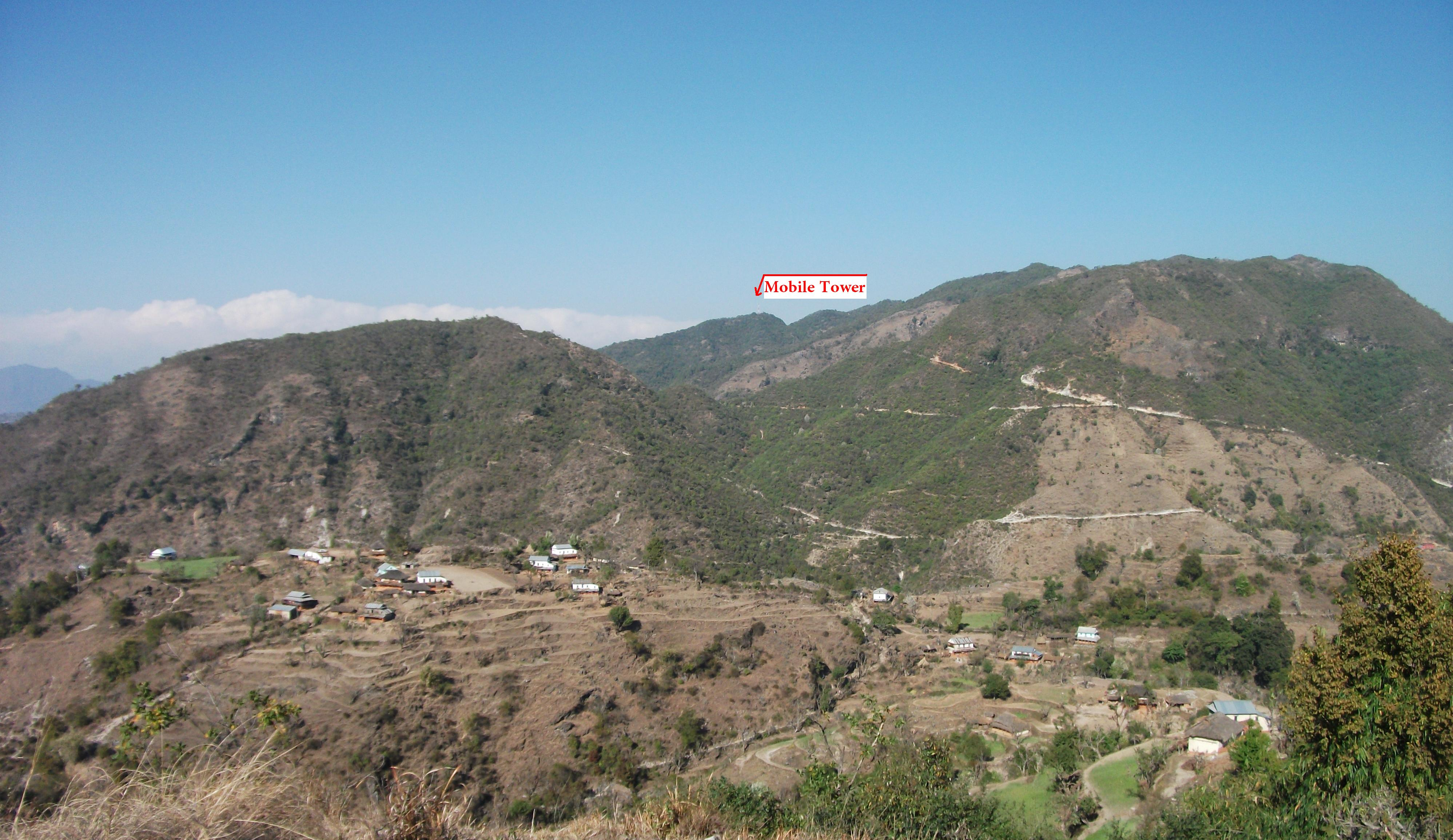
View of Satpokharee valley.

Ncell the country's largest private GSM mobile service provider, Ncell & other GSM mobile service provider multiple company has installed mobile tower using a solar power to operate its Base Transceiver Station (BTS) towers under its ‘Going Green’ scheme on 1 years ago at Nyaurikot Hill (Rehadi-Kerauli Jhadewa) north-east of valley.

== Tourism ==
The village sits on top of a large hill surrounded by hills on all sides. The view of mountains Dhaulagiri and Annapurna is a major source of beauty to the people of Satpokharee. Because all the surrounding villages, including Satpokhari, sit on hills made mostly of argillaceous rock mount, the local government of Nepal demanded that it be given to the cement industry. Now, Palpa cement and other cement companies are using the area as an Argillite quarry. Half of village is employed by the cement industry.

== Education ==
Due to the inconvenience of drinking water and the inconvenience of school, many new generations have been forced to leave the village. Elementary schools also have to walk 45 minutes uphill and downhill to get drinking water. So many new generations are forced to be displaced. Mr. Pomlal Sunar, a man who was forced to leave the village out of concern for his children's education, managed to get his daughter to graduate.

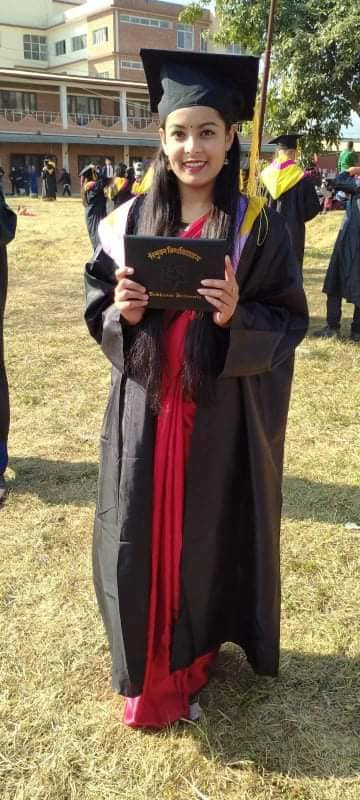
Parvati Sunar is the first person to study till Graduation In Satpokharee Village.

Miss Parvati Sunar is the first person to study till graduation from Tribhuvan University palpa. Otherwise no one has just passed 10 + 2.
