= Khanigau =

Khanigaun खानीगाउँ Mine Village
- Village development committee
- Location in Nepal
- Coordinates: 27.92°N 83.55°E
- Country: Nepal
- Zone: Lumbini Zone
- District: Palpa District

Population (1991)
  - Total: 2,221
- Time zone: UTC+5:45 (Nepal Time)

Khanigaun is a village development committee in Palpa District in the Lumbini Zone of southern Nepal. At the time of the 1991 Nepal census it had a population of 2221. It is located on the bank of the Kaligandaki river on north. On the north-west side there is Ranimahal known as Taj Mahal of Nepal.
