= Mainadi =

Coordinates: 27°53′N 83°25′E

Mainadi मैनदी
- Village development committee
- Interactive map of Mainadi
- Country: Nepal
- Zone: Lumbini Zone
- District: Palpa District

Population (1991)
  - Total: 1,315
- Time zone: UTC+5:45 (Nepal Time)

Mainadi is a village development committee in Palpa District in the Lumbini Zone of southern Nepal. At the time of the 1991 Nepal census it had a population of 1315 people living in 273 individual households.
