= Gumbat Stupa =

Buddhist stupa in Swat Valley in Pakistan

Coordinates: 34°41′22.3″N 72°11′05.9″E

Gumbat Stupa is a 2nd-century Buddhist stupa located in Swat valley in Pakistan. It is situated about 9 kilometres south of Birkot in the Kandag Valley of Gandhara.

== Archaeology ==
The stupa was first recorded by A. Stein in 1930 in which the main stupa and the votive stupas were identified. Later, other archaeologist also excavated the area. Gumbat Stupa is now marked as the Balo Kalay Stupa of Swat.

The remains of the stupa are scattered over a range of 1500 m wide and 1000 m breadth. The ruins was restored in 2011-2012 and about 25% of the terrace was excavated in 2011. The radiocarbon dating estimates the shrine and buildings were built in 2nd century.

The main stupa is located in the lower zone which has a plinth with length of 17 m in each side and a projection of about 3.7m. Above the dome exists remains of Harmika and umbrellas. The stupa has two terraces and a monastery and the dome is a double-domed cupola and surrounded by more than 20 smaller stupas.
