= Timurekha =

Coordinates: 27°50′N 83°28′E

Timurekha टिमुरेखा
- Village development committee
- Interactive map of Timurekha
- Country: Nepal
- Zone: Lumbini Zone
- District: Palpa District

Population (1991)
  - Total: 2,014
- Time zone: UTC+5:45 (Nepal Time)

Timurekha is a village development committee in Palpa District in the Lumbini Zone of southern Nepal. At the time of the 1991 Nepal census it had a population of 2014 people living in 323 individual households.
