= Rupse =

Rupse रूप्से
- Village development committee
- Location in Nepal
- Coordinates: 27.82°N 83.62°E
- Country: Nepal
- Zone: Lumbini Zone
- District: Palpa District

Population (1991)
  - Total: 1,755
- Time zone: UTC+5:45 (Nepal Time)

Rupse is a village development committee in Palpa District in the Lumbini Zone of southern Nepal. At the time of the 1991 Nepal census it had a population of 1755 people living in 308 individual households.

Rupse Waterfall is situated in this VDC.
