= Ringneraha =

Ringneraha रिङ्गनेरह
- Village development committee
- Location in Nepal
- Coordinates: 27.82°N 83.79°E
- Country: Nepal
- Zone: Lumbini Zone
- District: Palpa District

Population (1991)
  - Total: 2,285
- Time zone: UTC+5:45 (Nepal Time)

Ringneraha is a village development committee in Palpa District in the Lumbini Zone of southern Nepal. Ringneraha is a fourth-order administrative division and is located in Lumbinī Zone, Western Region, Nepal. At the time of the 1991 Nepal census it had a population of 2285 people living in 401 individual households.
