= Madhav Bahadur Thapa =

Nepalese politician

The Honourable Madhav Bahadur Thapa
- माधवबहादुर थापा

Member of Parliament, Pratinidhi Sabha
- Incumbent
- Assumed office 26 March 2026
- Preceded by: Thakur Prasad Gaire
- Constituency: Palpa 2

Personal details
- Citizenship: Nepalese
- Party: Rastriya Swatantra Party
- Profession: Politician

Madhav Bahadur Thapa (Nepali: माधवबहादुर थापा) is a Nepalese politician serving as a member of parliament from the Rastriya Swatantra Party. He is the member of the 7th Pratinidhi Sabha elected from Palpa 2 constituency in 2026 Nepalese General Election securing 26,736 votes and defeating his closest contender Himal Dutta Shrestha of the Nepali Congress.
