= Som Prasad Pandey =

Nepali politician

- सोम प्रसाद पाण्डेय

Ministry of Industry, Commerce and Supplies
- In office 12 October 2015 – 26 August 2016
- Preceded by: Mahesh Basnet
- Succeeded by: Nabindra Raj Joshi

Member of Parliament, Pratinidhi Sabha
- Incumbent
- Assumed office 4 March 2018
- Preceded by: Lila Kumari Wagle
- Constituency: Palpa 2
- In office October 1994 – May 2002
- Preceded by: Gambhir Jung Karki
- Succeeded by: Lila Kumari Wagle
- Constituency: Palpa 2

Member of Constituent Assembly
- In office 21 January 2014 – 14 October 2017
- Preceded by: Lila Kumari Wagle

Personal details
- Born: 2 June 1956 (age 69)
- Party: CPN (Unified Socialist)
- Other political affiliations: CPN (UML)
- Profession: Lawyer

Som Prasad Pandey (Nepali: सोम प्रसाद पाण्डेय) Member of Parliament, Ex-Minister of Industry.

== Professional career ==
A Nepali politician, belonging to the Communist Party of Nepal (Unified Socialist) and he became a member of Parliament. He is also an ex-minister of Industry and commerce.

Pandey won the Palpa-2 parliamentary seat in the 1994 election and the 1999 election. He served as the Chairman of the Human Rights and External Affairs Committee of the House of Representatives. In April 2008, he contested the Palpa-2 seat in the Constituent Assembly election, but was defeated by the Maoist candidate Lila Somai.
