= Dal Bahadur Rana =

Nepali politician (born 1959)

- दल बहादुर राना

Minister of Land Reform and Management of Nepal
- In office 25 February 2014 – 12 October 2015
- President: Ram Baran Yadav
- Prime Minister: Sushil Koirala
- Vice President: Paramananda Jha
- Succeeded by: Ram Kumar Subba

Member of Parliament, Pratinidhi Sabha
- In office 4 March 2018 – 18 September 2022
- Preceded by: Radha Krishna Kandel
- Constituency: Palpa 1
- In office October 1994 – May 1999
- Preceded by: Kalu Ram Rana
- Succeeded by: Bhadra Bahadur Thapa
- Constituency: Palpa 1

Member of Constituent Assembly
- In office 28 May 2008 – 28 May 2012
- Preceded by: Bhadra Bahadur Thapa
- Succeeded by: Ram Krishna Kandel
- Constituency: Palpa 1

Personal details
- Born: 19 June 1959 (age 66) Palpa District
- Party: CPN (Unified Marxist-Leninist)

Dal Bahadur Rana is a member of the Communist Party of Nepal (Unified Marxist-Leninist) who assumed the post of the Minister of Land Reform and Management of Nepal on 25 February 2014 under Sushil Koirala–led government.

In the 2008 Constituent Assembly election he was elected from the Palpa-1 constituency, winning 19,185 votes.

His son, Santosh Rana, was a commercial airline co-pilot who was killed on the 2016 Air Kasthamandap crash.
