= Siluwa =

Siluwa सिलुवा
- Village development committee
- Location in Nepal
- Coordinates: 27.82°N 83.85°E
- Country: Nepal
- Zone: Lumbini Zone
- District: Palpa District

Population (1991)
  - Total: 4,616
- Time zone: UTC+5:45 (Nepal Time)

Siluwa is a village development committee in Palpa District in the Lumbini Zone of southern Nepal. At the time of the 1991 Nepal census, it had a population of 4616 people living in 827 individual households. Villages within it include Romandi.
