= Galdha =

Coordinates: 27°47′N 83°55′E

Galdha गल्धा
- Village development committee
- Interactive map of Galdha
- Country: Nepal
- Zone: Lumbini Zone
- District: Palpa District

Population (1991)
  - Total: 3,304
- Time zone: UTC+5:45 (Nepal Time)

Galdha is a village development committee in Palpa District in the Lumbini Zone of southern Nepal. At the time of the 1991 Nepal census it had a population of 3304 people living in 544 individual households.
