= Heklang =

Heklang हेकलाङ
- Village development committee
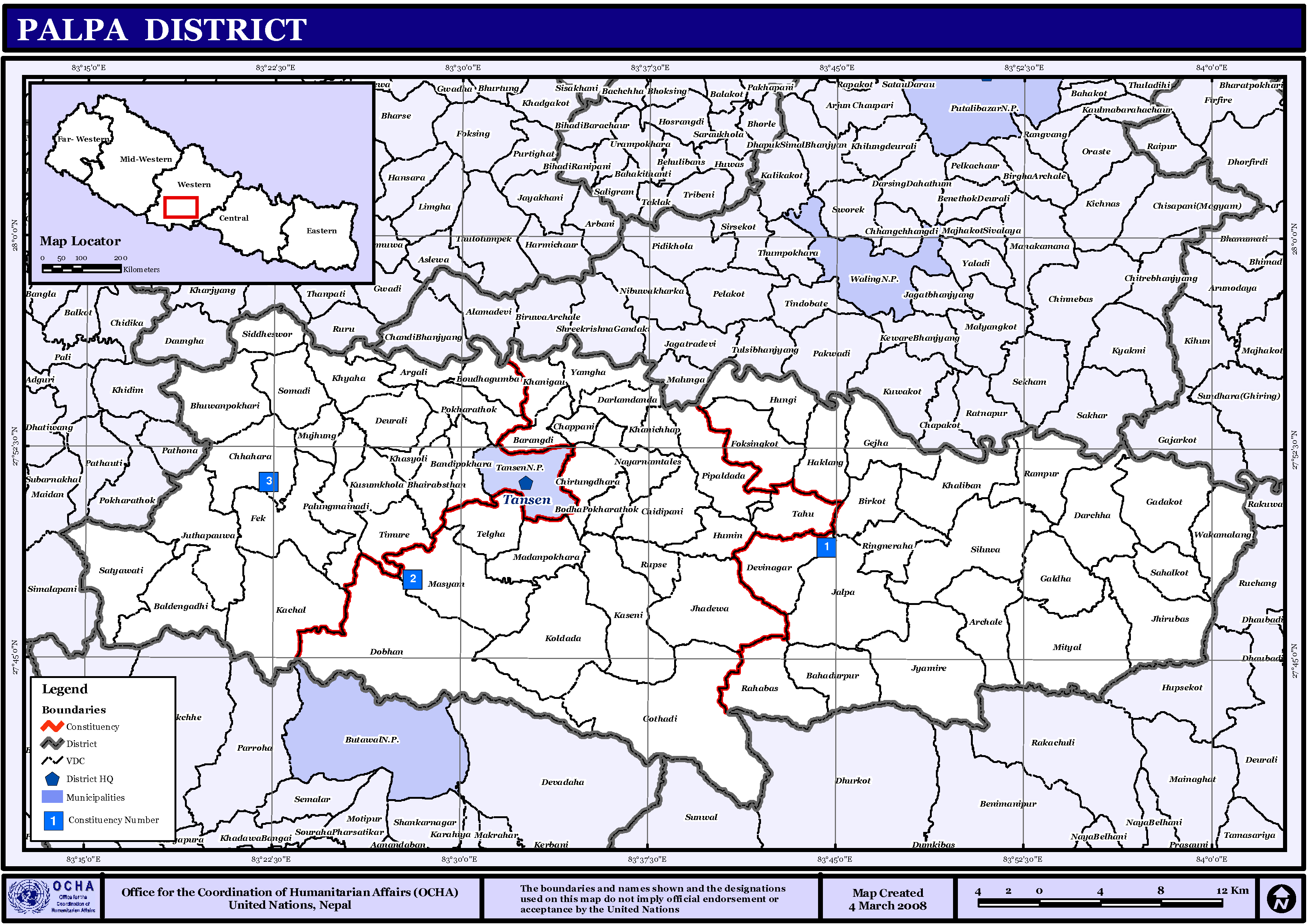
- Map of the village development committees in Palpa District

- Location in Nepal
- Coordinates: 27.87°N 83.74°E
- Country: Nepal
- Zone: Lumbini Zone
- District: Palpa District

Population (2011)
  - Total: 3,112
- Time zone: UTC+5:45 (Nepal Time)

Heklang is a village development committee in Palpa District in the Lumbini Zone of southern Nepal. At the time of the 2011 Nepal census it had a population of 3,112 people living in 665 individual households.
