= Nisdi Rural Municipality =

Nisdi Rural Municipality निस्दी गाउँपालिका
- Gaunpalika
- Location in Nepal
- Coordinates: 27.770111°N 83.923796°E
- Country: Nepal
- Province: Lumbini Province
- District: Palpa District

Area
  - Total: 195 km^{2} (75 sq mi)

Population
  - Total: 22,611
  - Density: 116/km^{2} (300/sq mi)
- Time zone: UTC+5:45 (Nepal Time)
- Website: http://nisdimun.gov.np/

Nisdi Rural Municipality (Nepali :निस्दी गाउँपालिका) is a Gaunpalika in Palpa District in Lumbini Province of Nepal. On 12 March 2017, the government of Nepal implemented a new local administrative structure, with the implementation of the new local administrative structure, VDCs have been replaced with municipal and Village Councils. Nisdi is one of these 753 local units.
