= Sahalkot =

Sahalkot साहलकोट
- Village development committee
- Location in Nepal
- Coordinates: 27.80°N 83.97°E
- Country: Nepal
- Zone: Lumbini Zone
- District: Palpa District

Population (1991)
  - Total: 1,852
- Time zone: UTC+5:45 (Nepal Time)

Sahalkot is a village development committee in Palpa District in the Lumbini Zone of southern Nepal. At the time of the 1991 Nepal census it had a population of 1852 people living in 275 individual households.
