= Rainadevi Chhahara Rural Municipality =

Rainadevi Chhahara Rural Municipality रैनादेवी छहरा गाउँपालिका
- Gaunpalika
- Location in Nepal
- Coordinates: 27.8758325°N 83.3653428°E
- Country: Nepal
- Province: Lumbini Province
- District: Palpa District

Government
  - Type: local government
  - Chairperson: Rukmangat Bhattarai
  - Vice Chairperson: Yuvraj Thapa
  - CAO: Rajiv Panthi

Area
  - Total: 176 km^{2} (68 sq mi)

Population
  - Total: 26,469
  - Density: 150/km^{2} (390/sq mi)
- Time zone: UTC+5:45 (Nepal Time)
- Website: http://rainadevichhaharamun.gov.np/

Rainadevi Chhahara Rural Municipality (Nepali :रैनादेवी छहरा गाउँपालिका) is a Gaunpalika in Palpa District in Lumbini Province of Nepal. On 12 March 2017, the government of Nepal implemented a new local administrative structure, with the implementation of the new local administrative structure, VDCs have been replaced with municipal and Village Councils. Rainadevi Chhahara is one of these 753 local units.The previous Siddeshwor, Somadi, Bhuwanpokhari, Chhahara, Mujhung, Juthapauwa, Baldengadhi and Satyawati VDCs were merged to form Rainadevi Chhahara Rural Municipality.
