= Ripdikot Rural Municipality =

Ribdikot Rural Municipality रिब्दीकोट गाउँपालिका
- Gaunpalika
- Ribdikot Rural Municipality
- Interactive map of Ribdikot Rural Municipality
- Coordinates: 27.878386°N 83.472614°E
- Country: Nepal
- Province: Lumbini Province
- District: Palpa District

Area
  - Total: 125 km^{2} (48 sq mi)

Population
  - Total: 15,473
  - Density: 124/km^{2} (321/sq mi)
- Time zone: UTC+5:45 (Nepal Time)
- Website: http://ribdikotmun.gov.np/

Ribdikot Rural Municipality (Nepali :रिब्दीकोट गाउँपालिका) is a Gaunpalika in Palpa District in Lumbini Province of Nepal. On 12 March 2017, the government of Nepal implemented a new local administrative structure, with the implementation of the new local administrative structure, VDCs have been replaced with municipal and Village Councils. Ribdikot is one of these 753 local units.

Ribdikot is located in Palpa district. In order to fulfill the rights and obligations set by the spirit and spirit of the Constitution, the Government of Nepal is a viable, sustainable and competent government and not an alternative to the central government, with the intention of developing it as a government close to the people, with the spirit of competition and close to the people. All of us are of the opinion that Ribdikot Rural Municipality has been formed by merging 8 Village Development Committees Khyaha, Deurali, Khasyuli, Bhairavasthan, Kusumkhola, Palungmainadi, Thimure and Phek Gavis into a sustainable unit.

The total population of Ribdikot Rural Municipality is 15,473. Its area is 124.55 square kilometers. Its borders are Tansen municipality in the east, Rainadevi Chhahara rural municipality in the west, Tansen municipality and Gulmi district in the north and Tinau rural municipality in the south.

Agricultural business has a large share in the average family income and foreign employment is also one of the main sources of income for local residents. The trend of local manpower migrating abroad for work and study is increasing. In this rural municipality, there are significant educational institutions that provide education from basic to secondary level. In this rural municipality, 27 private schools, 6 M.V. And there are 6 high schools, 3 campuses. Although most of the houses have been electrified, some of the marginalized sections of citizens are not able to access electricity.

Due to the lack of people's representatives in the local bodies, the difficulty in implementing the planned development program and the difficulty in the necessary financial management, the expected development does not seem to be possible in this rural municipality area. Various festivals and fairs are celebrated in this rural municipality where people of different communities and castes live. Festivals like Tij, Dashai, Tihar, Magheskranti, Krishna Janmashtami, Buddha Jayanti etc. are celebrated according to their religion. In addition, Sarai dance, Fagu dance, Lache dance, Jhyaure, Deusi Bhailo and Big dance, etc., can be considered to have contributed significantly in building a culturally rich society.
