= Purbakhola Rural Municipality =

Purbakhola Rural Municipality पूर्वखोला गाउँपालिका!!!
- Gaunpalika
- Location in Nepal
- Coordinates: 27.812343°N 83.779076°E
- Country: Nepal
- Province: Lumbini Province
- District: Palpa District

Area
  - Total: 138 km^{2} (53 sq mi)

Population
  - Total: 19,590
  - Density: 142/km^{2} (368/sq mi)
- Time zone: UTC+5:45 (Nepal Time)
- Website: http://purbakholamun.gov.np/

Purbakhola Rural Municipality (Nepali :पूर्वखोला गाउँपालिका) is a Gaunpalika in Palpa District in Lumbini Province of Nepal. On 12 March 2017, the government of Nepal implemented a new local administrative structure, with the implementation of the new local administrative structure, VDCs have been replaced with municipal and Village Councils. Purbakhola is one of these 753 local units.
