= Bagnaskali Rural Municipality =

Bagnaskali Rural Municipality बगनासकाली गाउँपालिका
- Gaunpalika
- Location in Nepal
- Coordinates: 27.868165°N 83.589448°E
- Country: Nepal
- Province: Lumbini Province
- District: Palpa District

Area
  - Total: 84.3 km^{2} (32.5 sq mi)

Population
  - Total: 24,361
  - Density: 289/km^{2} (748/sq mi)
- Time zone: UTC+5:45 (Nepal Time)
- Website: http://baganaskalimun.gov.np/

Bagnaskali Rural Municipality (Nepali :वगनासकाली गाउँपालिका) is a Gaunpalika in Palpa District in Lumbini Province of Nepal. On 12 March 2017, the government of Nepal implemented a new local administrative structure, with the implementation of the new local administrative structure, VDCs have been replaced with municipal and Village Councils. Bagnaskali is one of these 753 local units.
