= Tinahu Rural Municipality =

Tinahu Rural Municipality तिनाउ गाउँपालिका
- Gaunpalika
- Location in Nepal
- Coordinates: 27.750476°N 83.495792°E
- Country: Nepal
- Province: Lumbini Province
- District: Palpa District

Area
  - Total: 202 km^{2} (78 sq mi)

Population
  - Total: 19,130
  - Density: 94.7/km^{2} (245/sq mi)
- Time zone: UTC+5:45 (Nepal Time)
- Website: http://tinaumun.gov.np

Tinahu Rural Municipality (Nepali :तिनाउ गाउँपालिका) is a Gaunpalika in Palpa District in Lumbini Province of Nepal. On 12 March 2017, the government of Nepal implemented a new local administrative structure, with the implementation of the new local administrative structure, VDCs have been replaced with municipal and Village Councils. Tinahu is one of these 753 local units.
