= Mathagadi Rural Municipality =

Mathagadi Rural Municipality माथागढी गाउँपालिका
- Gaunpalika
- Location in Nepal
- Coordinates: 27.769899°N 83.669408°E
- Country: Nepal
- Province: Lumbini Province
- District: Palpa District

Area
  - Total: 215 km^{2} (83 sq mi)

Population
  - Total: 25,017
  - Density: 116/km^{2} (301/sq mi)
- Time zone: UTC+5:45 (Nepal Time)
- Website: http://mathagadhimun.gov.np/

Mathagadi Rural Municipality (Nepali :माथागढी गाउँपालिका) is a Gaunpalika in Palpa District in Lumbini Province of Nepal. On 12 March 2017, the government of Nepal implemented a new local administrative structure, with the implementation of the new local administrative structure, VDCs have been replaced with municipal and Village Councils. Mathagadi is one of these 753 local units.
