= Palpa District =

Coordinates: 27°52′0″N 83°33′0″E

Pālpā District पाल्पा जिल्ला
- District
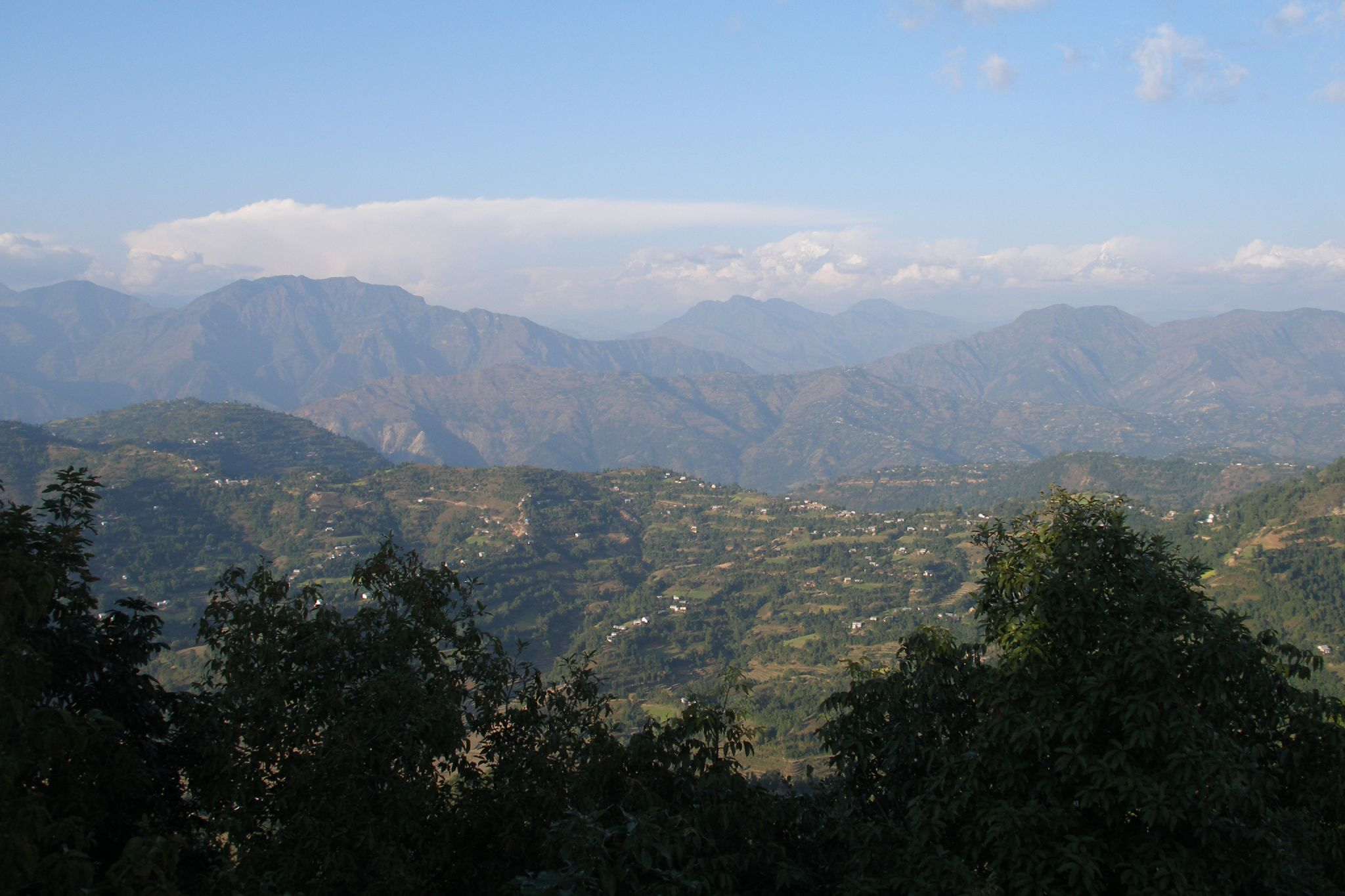
- Mahabharat Range near Tansen. The High Himalayas are barely visible in the snow and cloud.

- Country: Nepal
- Province: Lumbini Province
- Admin HQ.: Tansen

Government
  - Type: Coordination committee
  - Body: DCC, Pālpā
  - Head: Santosh Lal Shrestha (Congress)

Area
  - Total: 1,373 km^{2} (530 sq mi)

Population (2011)
  - Total: 261,180
  - Density: 190.2/km^{2} (492.7/sq mi)
- Time zone: UTC+05:45 (NPT)
- Telephone Code: 075
- Website: Official Website

Palpa District (Nepali: पाल्पा जिल्ला), a part of Lumbini Province, is one of the seventy-seven districts of Nepal, a landlocked country of South Asia. The district, with Tansen as its headquarters, covers an area of 1,373 km^{2} (530 sq mi) and has a population (2021) of 245,027.

Palpa District is not far from Pokhara and easily reached by bus. Palpa was the seat of the Hindu Sen kingdom that ruled over this region from the 16th century for almost 300 years so the headquarter of Palpa is called "Tansen" (Nepali: तानसेन).

== Geography and climate ==
| Climate Zone | Elevation Range | % of Area |
|---|---|---|
| Lower Tropical | below 300 meters (1,000 ft) | 0.3% |
| Upper Tropical | 300 to 1,000 meters 1,000 to 3,300 ft. | 51.3% |
| Subtropical | 1,000 to 2,000 meters 3,300 to 6,600 ft. | 47.3% |

== Demographics ==
Historical population
| Census year | Pop. | ±% p.a. |
|---|---|---|
| 1981 | 214,442 | — |
| 1991 | 236,313 | +0.98% |
| 2001 | 268,558 | +1.29% |
| 2011 | 261,180 | −0.28% |
| 2021 | 242,423 | −0.74% |
Source: Citypopulation

At the time of the 2021 Nepal census, Palpa District had a population of 245,027. 7.31% of the population is under 5 years of age. It has a literacy rate of 83.67% and a sex ratio of 1173 females per 1000 males. 91,675 (37.41%) lived in municipalities.

Castes/ethnic groups in Palpa district (2021)
1. Magar (53.0%)
2. Bahun (15.6%)
3. Chhetri (7.70%)
4. Kami (6.97%)
5. Newar (3.50%)
6. Sarki (3.30%)
7. Kumal (2.90%)
8. Damai (1.93%)
9. Thakuri (1.54%)
10. Other Hill Janjati (1.67%)
11. Others (1.85%)

Hill Janjatis make up 58% of the population. Magars are 53% of the population, the only district where they form a majority. Khas people make up 37% of the population, of which Khas Dalits make up 12% of the population.

Languages of Palpa district (2021)
1. Nepali (62.2%)
2. Magar (33.7%)
3. Nepal Bhasha (1.81%)
4. Others (2.26%)

At the time of the 2021 census, 62.24% of the population spoke Nepali, 33.69% Magar and 1.81% Nepal Bhasha as their first language. In 2011, 61.9% of the population spoke Nepali as their first language.

Religion in Palpa District (2021)
| Religion | Percent |
| Hinduism | 91.39% |
| Buddhism | 5.43% |
| Prakriti | 1.62% |
| Christianity | 0.91% |
| Islam | 0.62% |
| Other or not stated | 0.03% |

== Local bodies ==
- Tansen Municipality
- Rampur, Palpa
- Rainadevi Chhahara Rural Municipality
- Ripdikot Rural Municipality
- Bagnaskali Rural Municipality
- Rambha Rural Municipality
- Purbakhola Rural Municipality
- Nisdi Rural Municipality
- Mathagadi Rural Municipality
- Tinahu Rural Municipality

== Major rivers and khola ==
- Kali Gandaki River
- Tinau Khola
- Ridi Khola
- Purwa Khola
- Jhumsa Khola
- Dovan River
1. Barabisse khola
2. Dumre Khola

== Major lakes ==
- Satyawati Lake (990m above sea level)
- Pravas Lake
- Sita Kunda

== Gallery ==
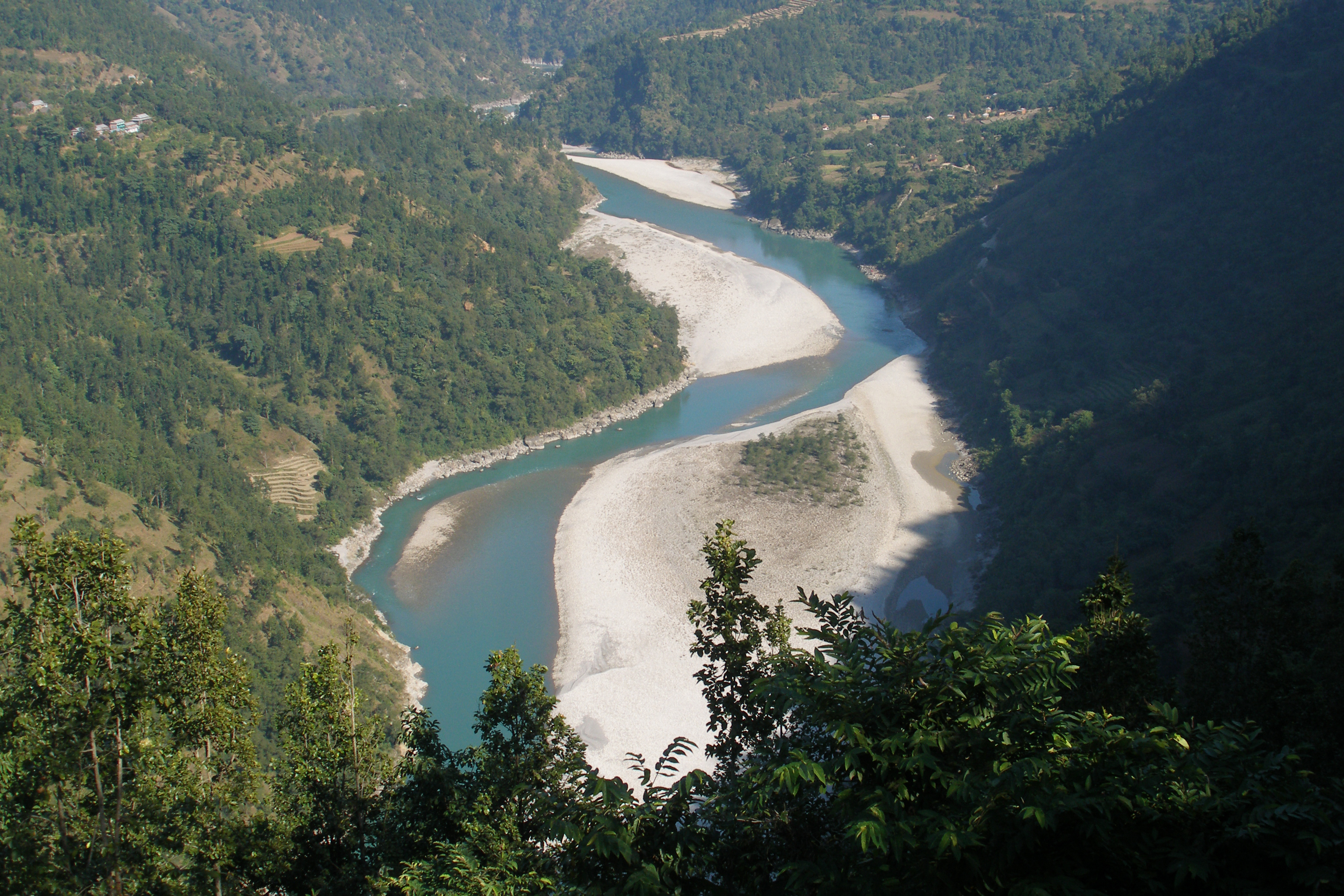
Gandaki River Valley in Palpa

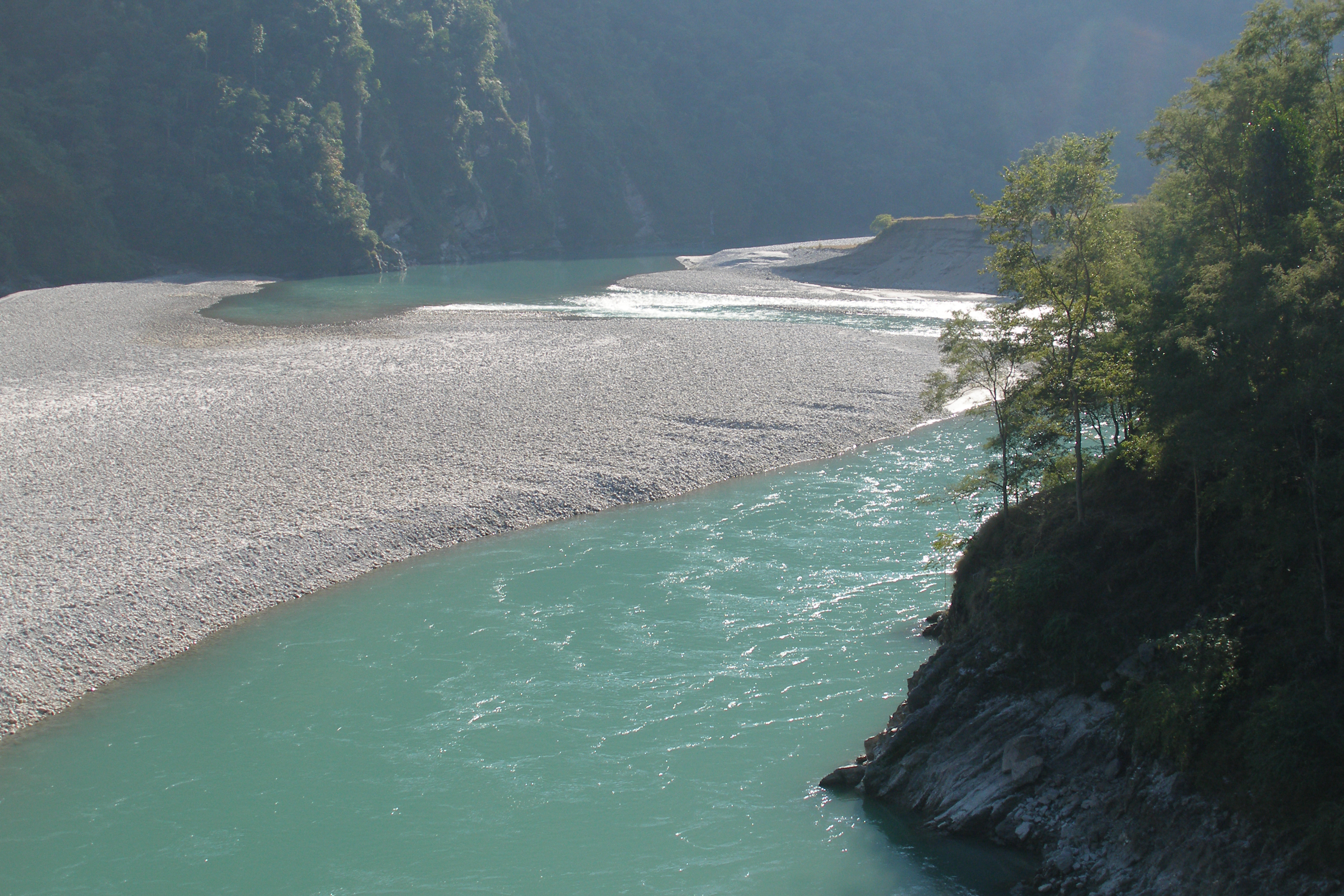
Gandaki River Valley in Palpa

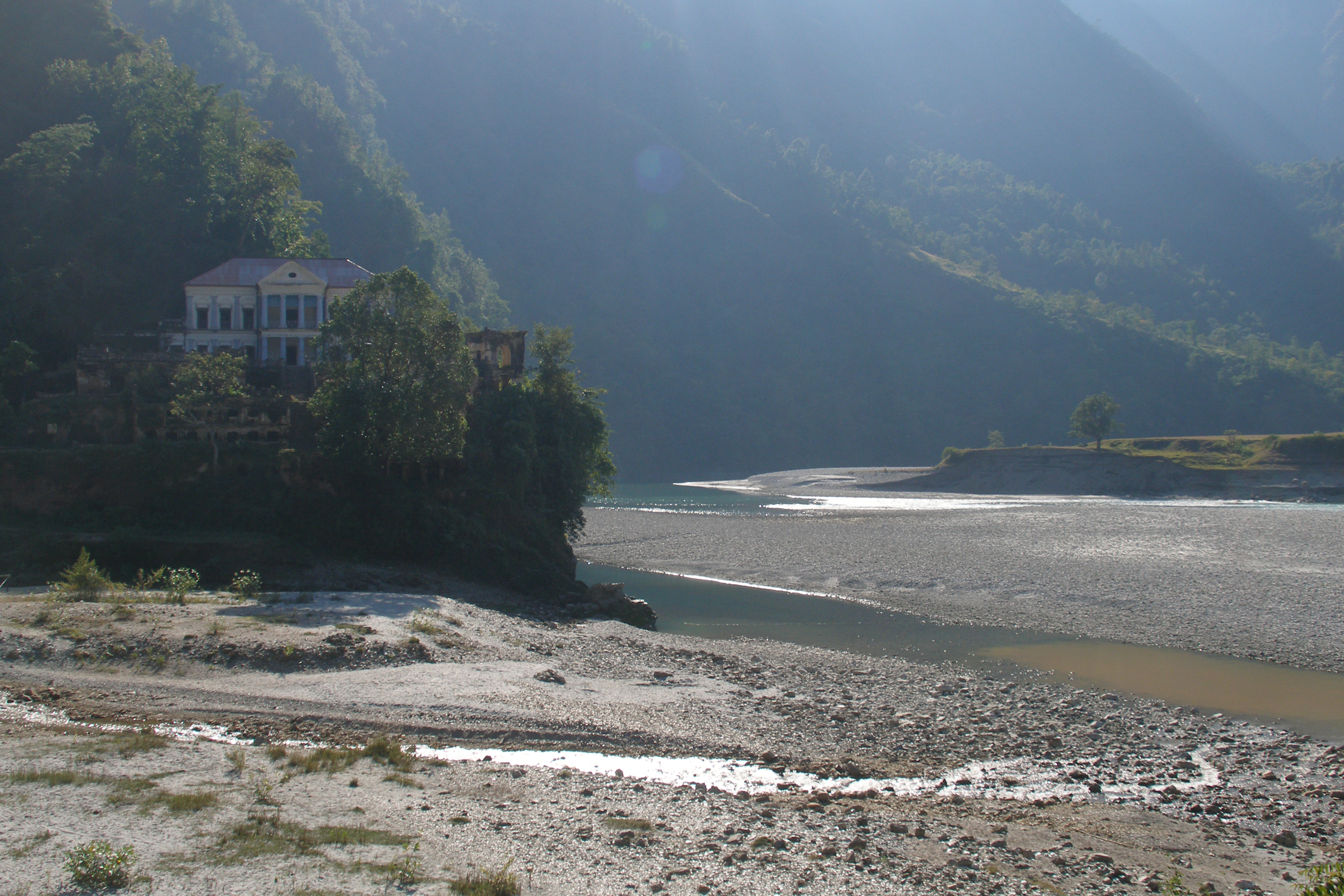
Ranighat Palace

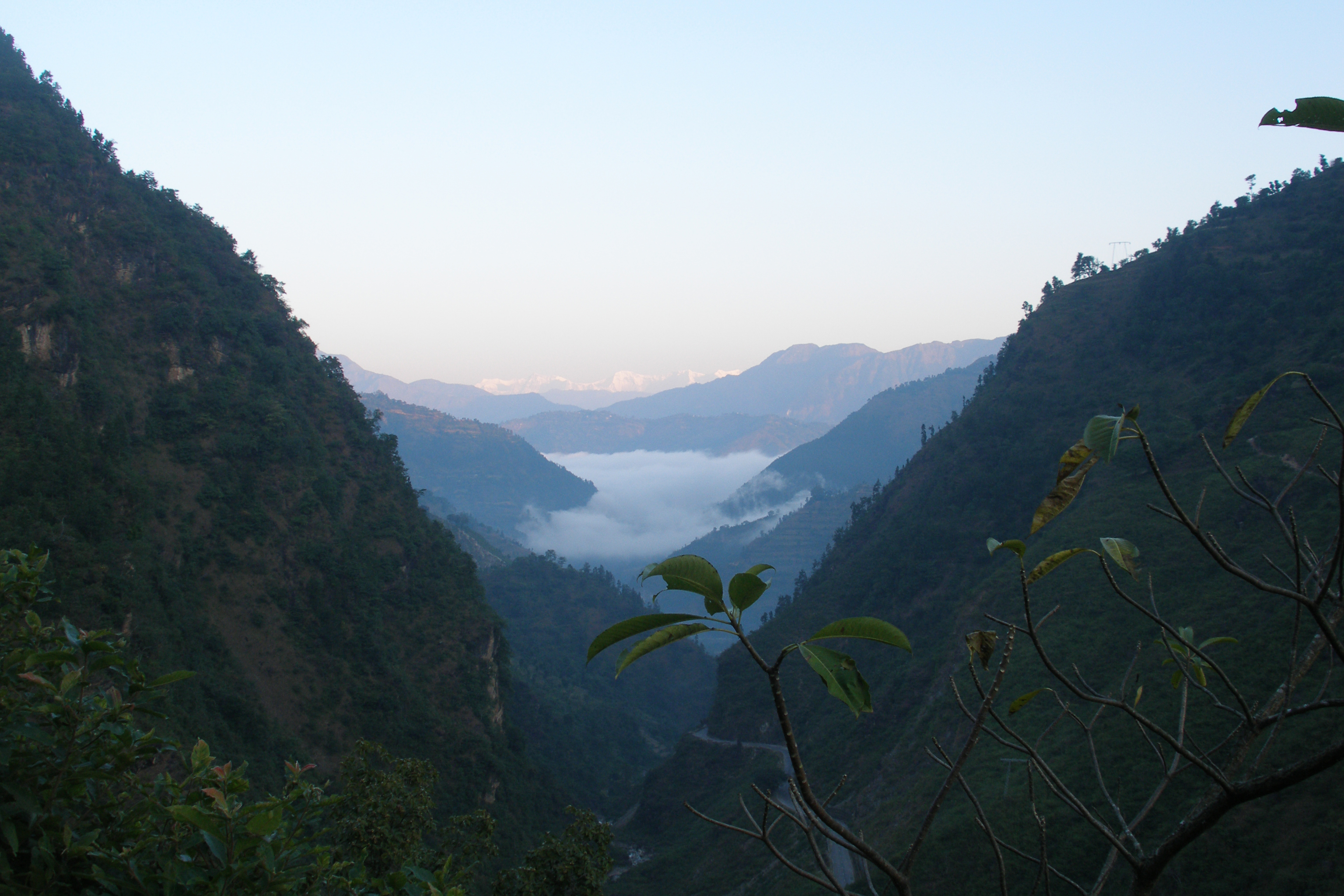
Mahabharat Range, Lesser Himalaya

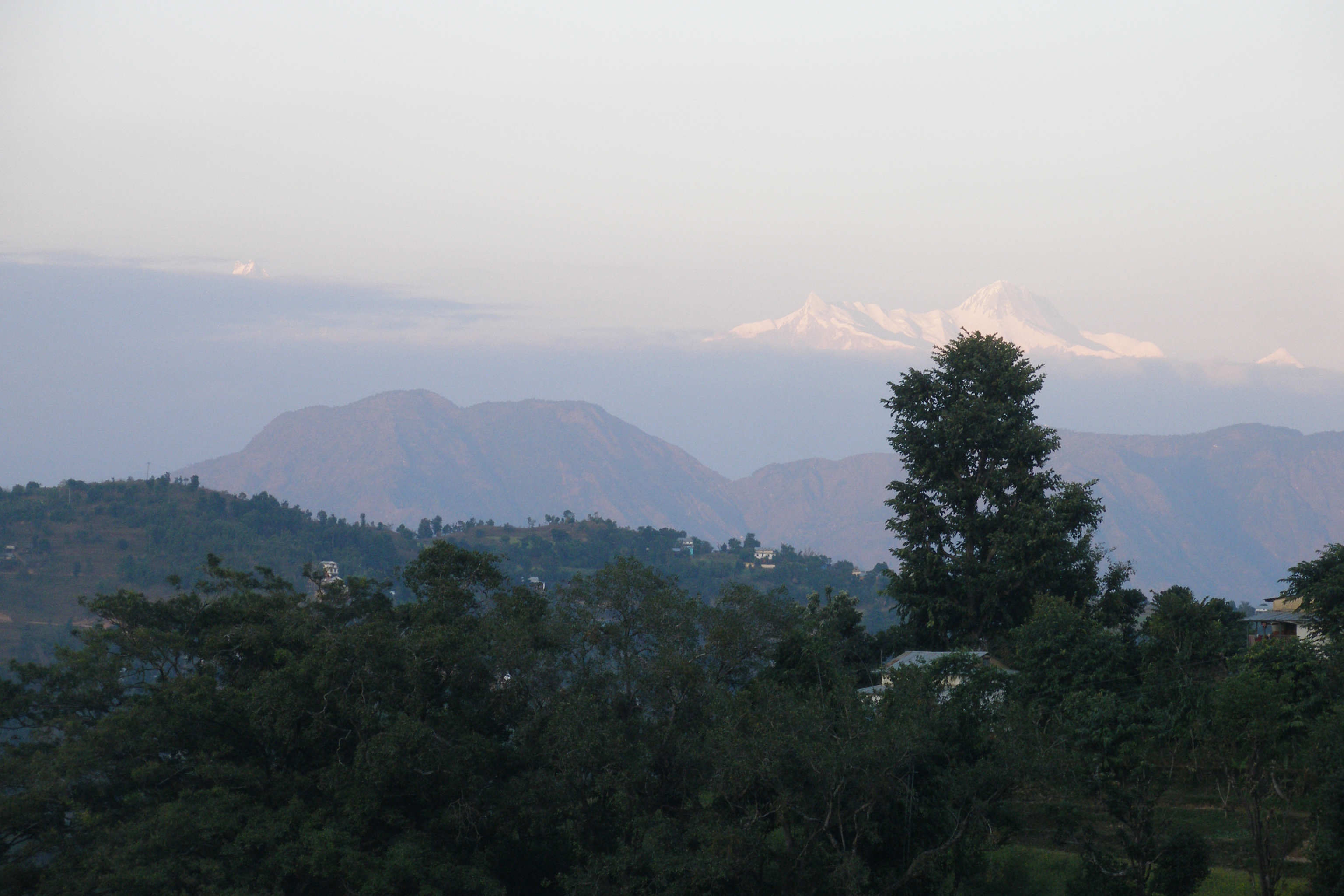
Mountains around Tansen

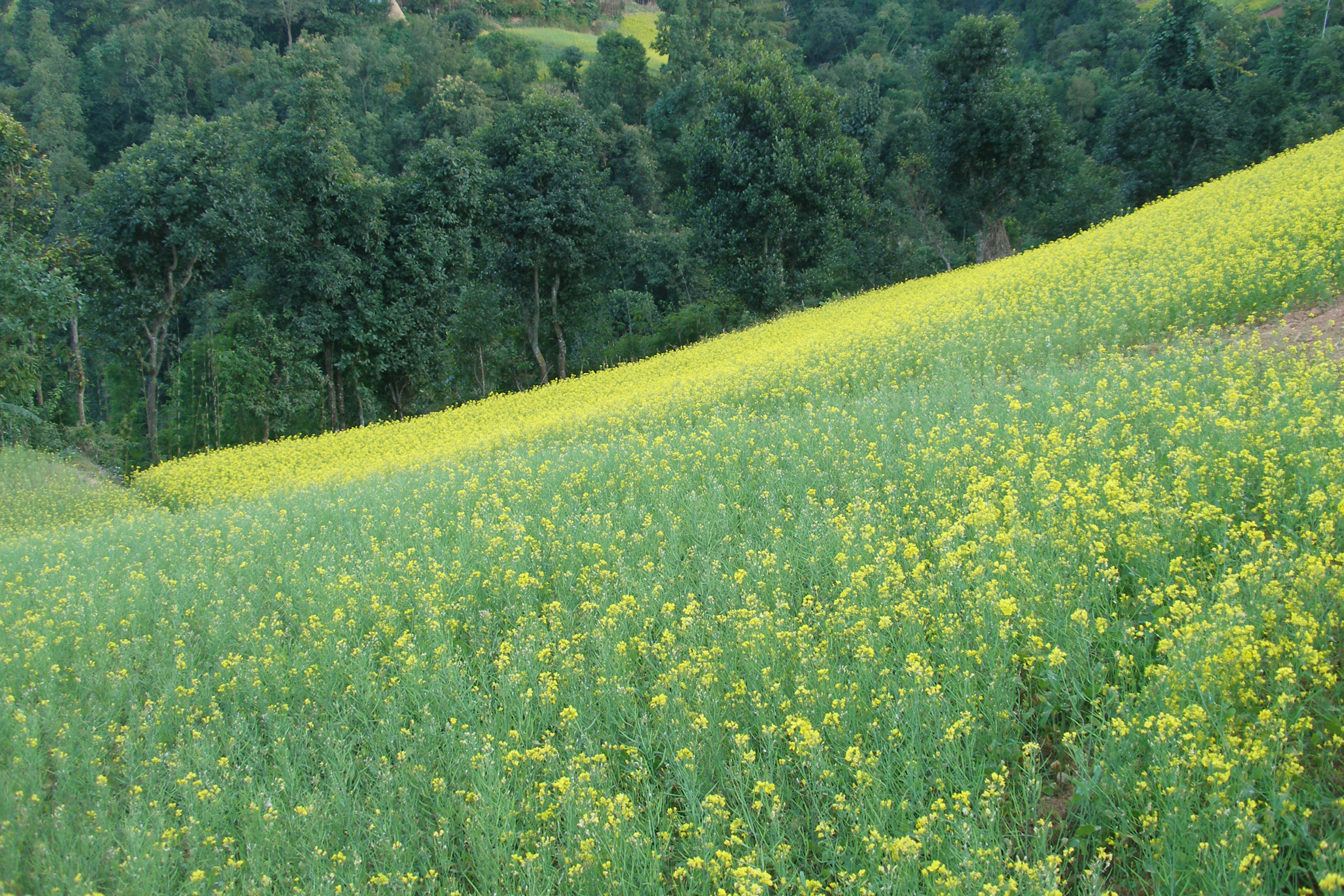
Glades around Tansen

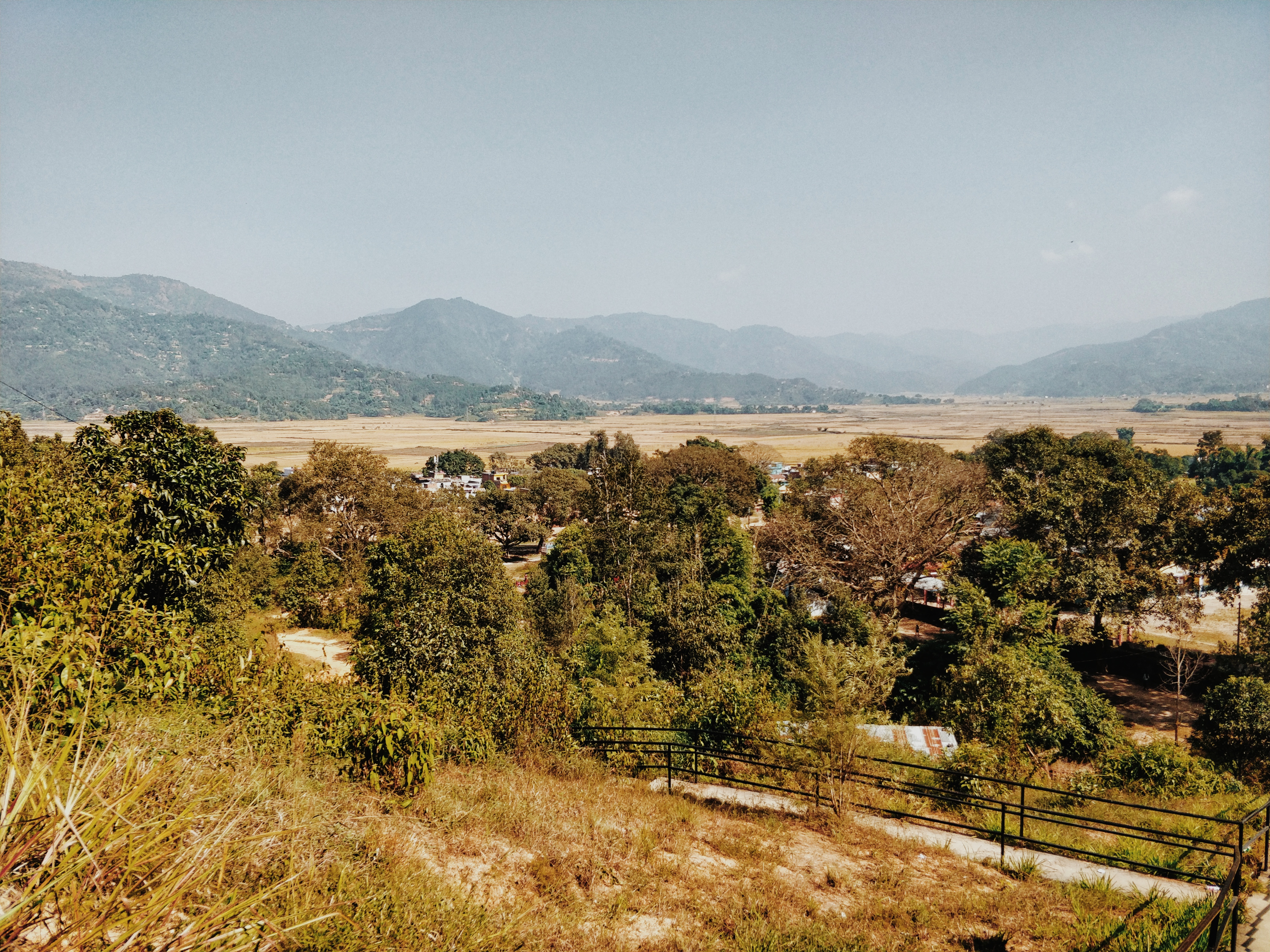
View of Palpa Madifaat ( rice field) & Damkada City during summer time

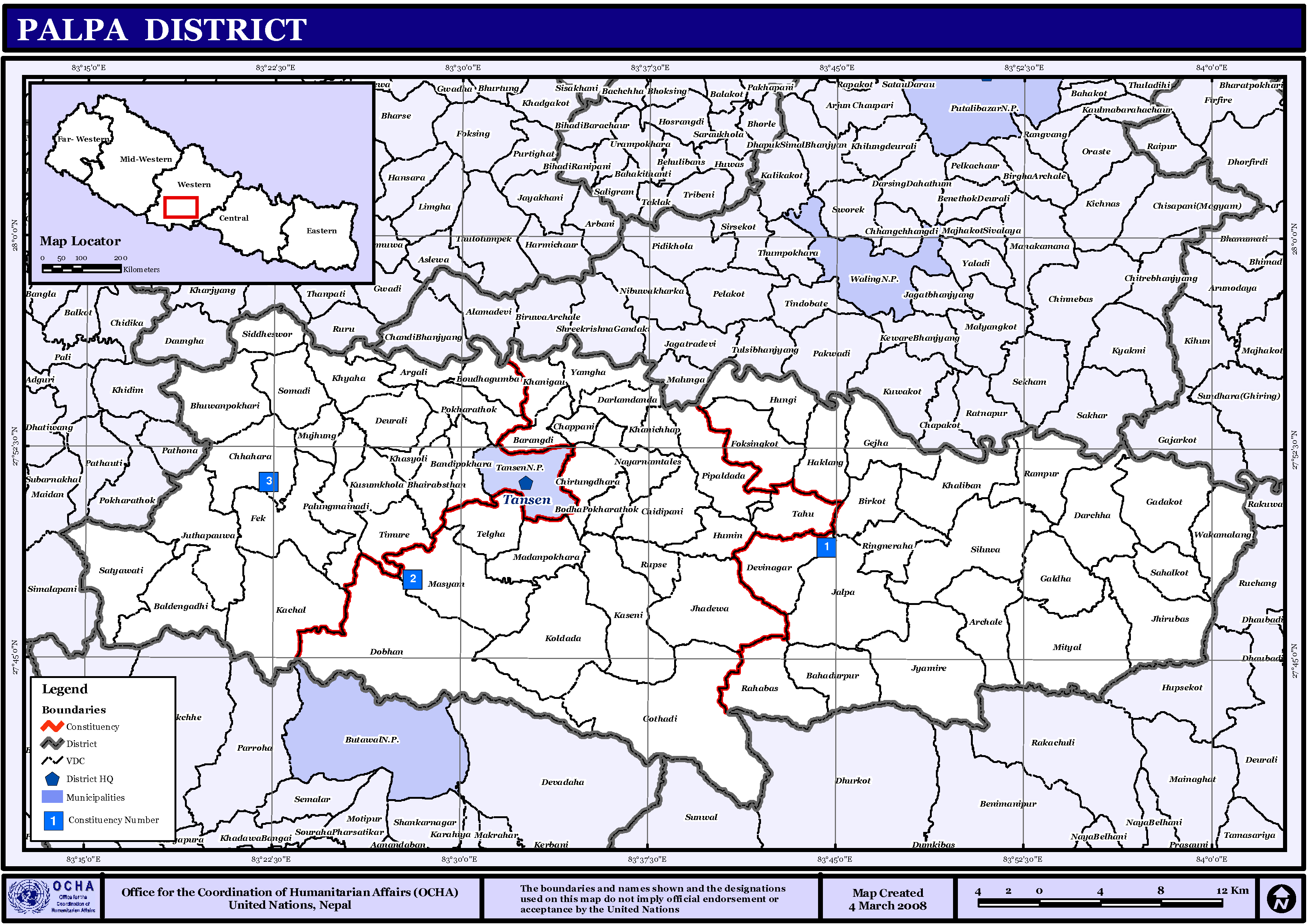
Map of Palpa District

== Places of attraction ==
- Argali Palace was constructed by Juddha Shamsher
- Forts like Kalika fort, Nuwakot fort, Bakumgadi Fort are historic place of attraction
- Mahamritunjaya Statue of Lord Shiva situated at Barangdi which is the biggest in Asia among metal statue of Lord Shiva
- Rambha Devi Temple a religious place 31 km (19 mi) east of Tansen in Tahu VDC.
- Ramdi is a religious place in the bank of Kali Gandaki River. On 1 Baisakh, there is a festival in this area.
- Ranighat Palace (Ranimahal) is also called Tajmahal of Nepal due to similar stories behind the construction of this palace. It was constructed by General Khadka for her wife Tejkumari in 1893 AD.
- Rishikesh Complex of Ruru Kshetra Hindu pilgrimage and cremation site
- Rishikesh Temple was built by the King Manimukunda Sen. According to Hindu mythology, this is the place where some part of body of Satidevei was cremated. It hosts a festival which occurs in 1st of Magh month when hidus come to take bath in Kali Gandaki River.
- Shrinagar Hill is spot for viewing high Himalayas. Dhawalagiri, Tukuche, Nilgiri, Annapurana, Himchuli and other mountains can be viewed from this place.
- Tansen is a historic city with palaces, temples, stupas and historic architecture.
- Vhairabsthan Temple is a Shiva temple with huge trident, believed to be largest in Asia.
- Madanpokhara is known its vegetable farmings and viewing great Madi Valley.

== Villages ==
- Satpokharee

== See also ==
- Lumbini Province
- Rampur, Palpa
