= Sitganga =

Sitganga, Shitaganga or Shitganga Municipality सितगङ्गा नगरपालिका
- Municipality
- Location within Lumbini Province Location within Nepal
- Coordinates: 27.83°N 83.07°E
- Country: Nepal
- Province: Lumbini
- District: Arghakanchi
- No. of wards: 14
- Established: 10 March 2017
- Incorporated (VDC): Subarnakhal, Sitapur, Thada, Jukena, Juluke, Siddhara and Simalapani

Government
  - Type: Mayor–council
  - Body: Sitganga Municipality
  - Mayor: Mr. Chhabilal Poudel
  - Deputy Mayor: Gita Bhatta

Area
  - Total: 610.43 km^{2} (235.69 sq mi)

Population (2011)
  - Total: 43,373
  - Density: 71.053/km^{2} (184.03/sq mi)
- Time zone: UTC+05:45 (NPT)
- Website: shitagangamun.gov.np

Sitganga Municipality is a municipality located in the Arghakhanchi District in the Lumbini Province in Nepal. The municipality spans 610.43 square kilometres (379.24 square miles) with a total population of 43,373, according to the 2011 Nepal census.

On March 10, 2017, the Government of Nepal restructured the old local-level bodies into 744 (later increased to 753) new local-level structures.

The previous Subarnakhal, Sitapur, Thada, Jukena, Juluke, Siddhara and Simalapani VDCs were merged to form Sitganga. Sitganga is now divided into 14 wards, with Thada being declared as the administrative center of the municipality.
