= Malarani Rural Municipality =

Malarani (RM) मालारानी गाउँपालिका
- Rural Municipality
- Location Malarani (RM) (Nepal)
- Coordinates: 28.06°N 83.12°E
- Country: Nepal
- Province: Lumbini
- District: Arghakhanchi
- Wards: 9
- Established: 10 March 2017

Government
  - Type: Rural Council
  - Chairperson: Mr. Dal B. Bhattarai (UML)
  - Chief Administration Officer: Mr. Govinda Bhattarai
  - Term of office: (2017–2022)

Area
  - Total: 101.06 km^{2} (39.02 sq mi)

Population (2011)
  - Total: 28,044
  - Density: 277.50/km^{2} (718.72/sq mi)
- Time zone: UTC+5:45 (Nepal Standard Time)
- Headquarter: Khandaha
- Website: malaranimun.gov.np

Malarani is a Rural municipality located within the Arghakhanchi District of the Lumbini Province of Nepal. The rural municipality spans 101.06 square kilometres (39.02 sq mi) of area, with a total population of 28,044 according to a 2011 Nepal census.

On March 10, 2017, the Government of Nepal restructured the local level bodies into 753 new local level structures. The previous Khan, Khandaha, Bangi, Hansapur, Gorkhunga, Arghatos (half portion), and Mareng VDCs were merged to form Malarani Rural Municipality. Malarani is divided into 9 wards, with Khandaha declared the administrative center of the rural municipality.

== Demographics ==
At the time of the 2011 Nepal census, Malarani Rural Municipality had a population of 28,044. Of these, 99.9% spoke Nepali as their first language.

In terms of ethnicity/caste, 35.6% were Hill Brahmin, 25.6% Chhetri, 15.6% Kami, 13.1% Magar, 5.7% Sarki, 2.8% Damai/Dholi, 0.7% Newar, 0.3% Gharti/Bhujel, 0.2% Sanyasi/Dasnami, 0.1% Gurung, 0.1% Thakuri and 0.2% others.

In terms of religion, 99.8% were Hindu, 0.1% Buddhist and 0.1% Christian.

In terms of literacy, 71.6% could read and write, 1.5% could only read and 26.9% could neither read nor write.
