= Bhumikasthan =

Municipality in Nepal

Bhumikasthan Municipality भूमिकास्थान नगरपालिका
- Municipality
- Location within Lumbini Province Location within Nepal
- Coordinates: 27.97°N 83.06°E
- Country: Nepal
- Province: Lumbini Province
- District: Arghakanchi
- No. of wards: 10
- Established: 10 March 2017
- Incorporated (VDC): Dhakawang, Dharapani, Asurkot, Khilji, Nuwakot, Dhikura and Dhanchaur

Government
  - Type: Mayor–council
  - Body: Bhumikasthan Municipality Municipality
  - Mayor: Mr. Jhabilal Thapa
  - Deputy Mayor: Mr. Balakrishana Banjade

Area
  - Total: 159.13 km^{2} (61.44 sq mi)

Population (2011)
  - Total: 32,640
  - Density: 205.1/km^{2} (531.2/sq mi)
- Time zone: UTC+05:45 (NPT)
- Website: bhumikasthanmun.gov.np

Bhumikasthan Municipality is a municipality located within the Arghakhanchi District of the Lumbini Province of Nepal. The municipality spans 159.13 square kilometres (61.44 sq mi), with a total population of 32,640 according to a 2011 Nepal census.

On March 10, 2017, the Government of Nepal restructured the local level bodies into 744 (later increased to 753) new local level structures. The previous Dhatiwang, Dharapani, Asurkot, Khilji, Nuwakot, Dhikura and Dhanchaur VDCs were merged to form Bhumikasthan. Bhumikasthan is divided into 10 wards, with Nuwakot declared the administrative center of the municipality.
