= Chhatradev Rural Municipality =

Chhatradev (RM) छत्रदेव गाउँपालिका
- Rural Municipality
- Location Chhatradev (RM) (Nepal)
- Coordinates: 28°00′26″N 83°13′38″E
- Country: Nepal
- Province: Lumbini
- District: Arghakhanchi
- Wards: 8
- Established: 10 March 2017

Government
  - Type: Rural Council
  - Chairperson: Mr. Chandraman Shrestha
  - deputy chairperson Ms. Manisa Panthi Leader _title 3 = [mermbedr of ward chairperson ]: (2022 - )

Area
  - Total: 87.62 km^{2} (33.83 sq mi)

Population (2021)
  - Total: 21,611 [males−9,495 Females−12,116]
  - Density: 246.6/km^{2} (638.8/sq mi)
- Time zone: UTC+5:45 (Nepal Standard Time)
- Postal Code: 32700
- Area code: 077
- Headquarter: Chhatradev
- Website: chhatradevmun.gov.np

Chhatradev is a Rural municipality located within the Arghakhanchi District of the Lumbini Province of Nepal. The municipality spans 87.62 square kilometres (33.83 sq mi) of area, with a total population of 25,336 according to a 2011 Nepal census.

On March 10, 2017, the Government of Nepal restructured the local level bodies into 753 new local level structures. The previous Chhatraganj, Bhagawati, Balkot, Kerunga, Thulo Pokhara and small portion from Arghatos, Mareng, Chidika VDCs were merged to form Chhatradev Rural Municipality. Chhatradev is divided into 8 wards, with Chhatraganj declared the administrative center of the rural municipality.
