= Panini Rural Municipality =

Panini (RM) पाणिनी गाउँपालिका
- Rural Municipality
- Location Panini (RM) (Nepal)
- Coordinates: 27°54′36″N 83°16′48″E
- Country: Nepal
- Province: Lumbini
- District: Arghakhanchi
- Wards: 8
- Established: 10 March 2017

Government
  - Type: Rural Council
  - Chairperson: Mr. Tekraj Neupane
  - Vice-chairperson: Mrs. Narmada Gautam
  - Term of office: Currently

Area
  - Total: 151.42 km^{2} (58.46 sq mi)

Population (2011)
  - Total: 26,424
  - Density: 174.51/km^{2} (451.97/sq mi)
- Time zone: UTC+5:45 (Nepal Standard Time)
- Headquarter: Khidim
- Website: paninimun.gov.np

Panini is a Rural municipality located within the Arghakhanchi District of the Lumbini Province of Nepal. The municipality spans 151.42 square kilometres (58.46 sq mi) of area, with a total population of 23,424 according to a 2011 Nepal census.

On March 10, 2017, the Government of Nepal restructured the local level bodies into 753 new local level structures. The previous Panena, Khidim, Pokharathok, Pathauti, Maidan, Dhatiwang, Adguri and small portion from Chidika, Pali VDCs were merged to form Panini Rural Municipality. Panini is divided into 8 wards, with Khidim declared the administrative center of the rural municipality.

== Historical Background ==
The rural municipality is named after the famous Sanskrit Grammarian Maharshi Panini. It is believed that Pāṇini went through a tapasya in a cave inside a dense forest in anciant Arghakhachi. He was given Maheshwar Shutra the first formula in Vyakaran from Lord Shiva there.
