= Bangi =

Bangi may refer to:

- Bangi (surname), an Indian surname
- Bangi, Afghanistan
- Bangi, Iran (disambiguation)
- Bangi, Nepal
- Bangi, Malaysia
  - Bangi Komuter station, Malaysia
- Bandar Baru Bangi, Malaysia
- Bangi (federal constituency), a federal constituency in Selangor, Malaysia
- Bangi Station on the Seoul Subway in Seoul, South Korea
- Bangui, Central African Republic
- Bangi language, spoken in Central Africa
