= Manju Bhusal =

Nepalese Politician

The Honourable Manju Bhusal
- मञ्जु भुसाल

Member of Parliament, Pratinidhi Sabha
- Incumbent
- Assumed office 27 March 2026
- Constituency: Party list

Personal details
- Born: January 19, 1976 (age 50) Chidika (now Panini), Arghakhanchi District, Nepal
- Citizenship: Nepali
- Party: Rastriya Swatantra Party (2025-present)
- Spouse: Narayan Prasad Bhusal
- Parents: Megh Bahadur Gyawali (father); Hira Devi Gyawali (mother)
- Profession: Politician; General contractor

Manju Gyawali Bhusal (née Gyawali; Nepali: मञ्जु भुसाल) is a Nepalese politician and general contractor who is a member of the 7th Pratinidhi Sabha. She was elected to the House of Representatives through proportional representation under the Khas Arya female cluster.

She is the managing director of N.B. Engineering and Construction. She is the first woman elected as a district president of the Federation of Contractors' Association, Lumbini, Rupandehi.

== Early life and education ==
Manju was born on January 19, 1976, into a Gyawali family in Arghakhanchi district, Nepal. She is the daughter of Megh Bahadur Gyawali and Hira Devi Gyawali. She completed her high school degree.

== Professional career and social involvement ==
She began her career as a general contractor, establishing N.B. Engineering and Construction in Rupandehi. She became the first woman to be a district president of the Federation of Contractors' Association, Lumbini, Rupandehi. She displayed leadership and managerial roles in various social organizations. She served as an executive member of the Butwal Chamber of Commerce and Industry, president of JCI Butwal Lady in 2016, national women's coordinator of JCI Nepal in 2017, and a central committee member of the Federation of Contractors’ Associations of Nepal.

== Politics ==
She is from a political family. Her grandfather, Man Bahadur Gyawali, was a zonal commissioner; her two grandmothers, Gita Devi Gyawali and Hira Devi Gyawali, both became VDC chairpersons in the Panchayat era. Her father, Meghnath Gyawali, was also chairperson of Chidika. She joined Nepal Student Union during her college days in 1994. She turned communist by joining the Communist Party of Nepal (Maoist Centre) in 2002. After the merger between two communist parties in 2022, she joined the Communist Party of Nepal (Unified Marxist–Leninist).

She joined the Rastriya Swatantra Party in 2025, following the Nepalese Gen Z protests. She was nominated as a proportional representative member of parliament from the Rastriya Swatantra Party in the 2026 Nepalese general election. She is now a member of the infrastructure development parliamentary committee for the Rastriya Swatantra Party in the Pratinidhi Sabha since April 2026.
