= Jukena =

Jukena जुकेना
- Village development committee
- Location in Lumbini Province Jukena (Nepal)
- Coordinates: 27.89°N 83.04°E
- Country: Nepal
- Zone: Lumbini Zone
- District: Arghakhanchi District

Population (2011)
  - Total: 6,647
  - Religions: Hindu
- Time zone: UTC+5:45 (Nepal Time)
- Postal code: 32706

Jukena (जुकेना) is an administration geography called VDC (local level geo-political division) in Arghakhanchi District in the Lumbini Zone of southern Nepal. It is situated at the southern lap of the Mahabharat mountain range and stretches toward the south and west. It is consequently surrounded by Dhanchaur, Thada, Siddhara and Jaluke VDCs in the north, east, south and west consequently. It is adjacent to the Western part of Pyuthan district. At the time of the 2011 Nepal census, it had a population of 6,647 and had 1435 houses in the town.
