= Nepal Airlines Flight 183 =

2014 aviation accident in Nepal

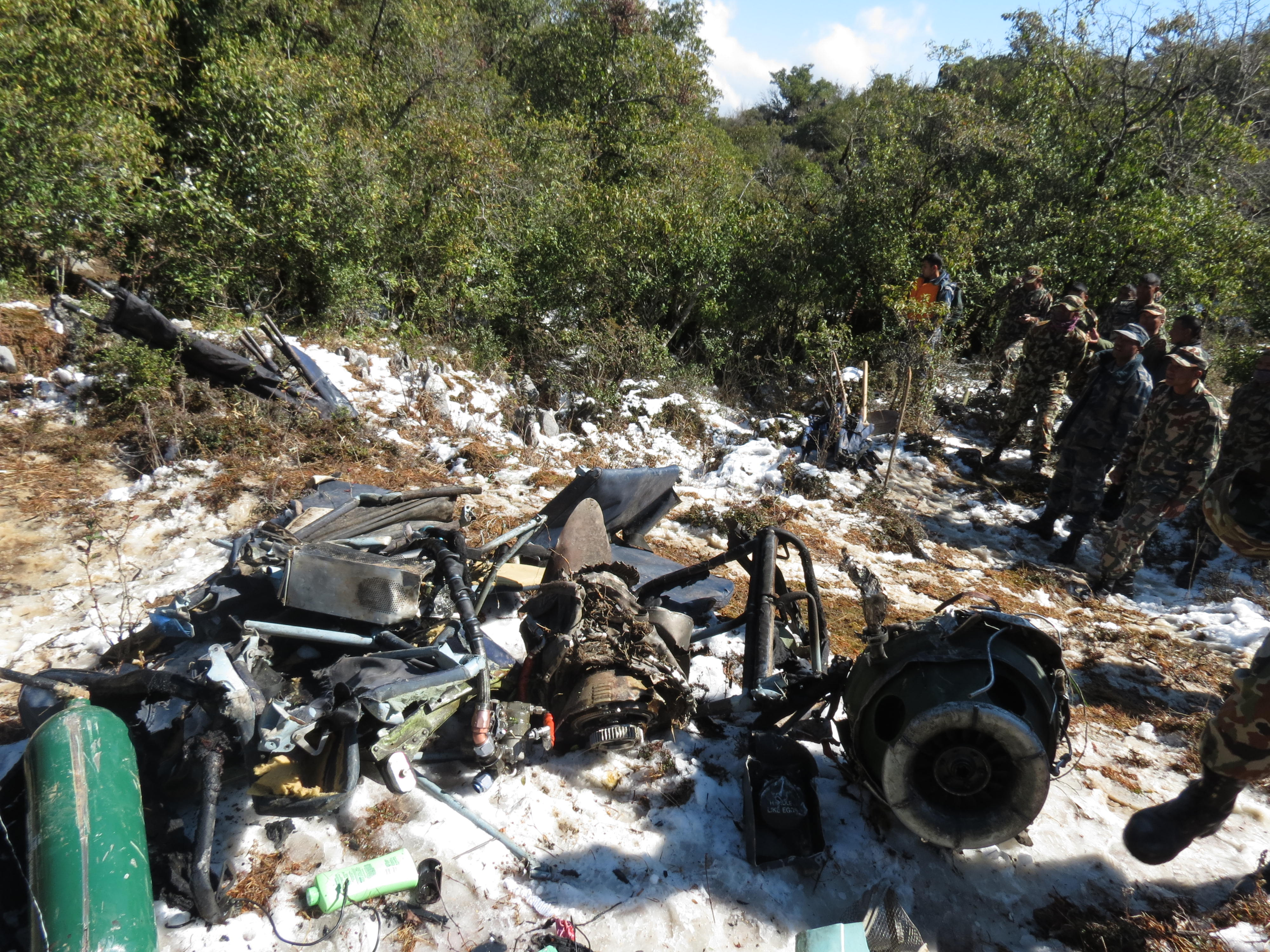
- Wreckage of the aircraft

Accident
- Date: 16 February 2014
- Summary: Controlled flight into terrain due to pilot error
- Site: Dhikura, Arghakhanchi District, Nepal; 27.91°N 83.12°E

Aircraft
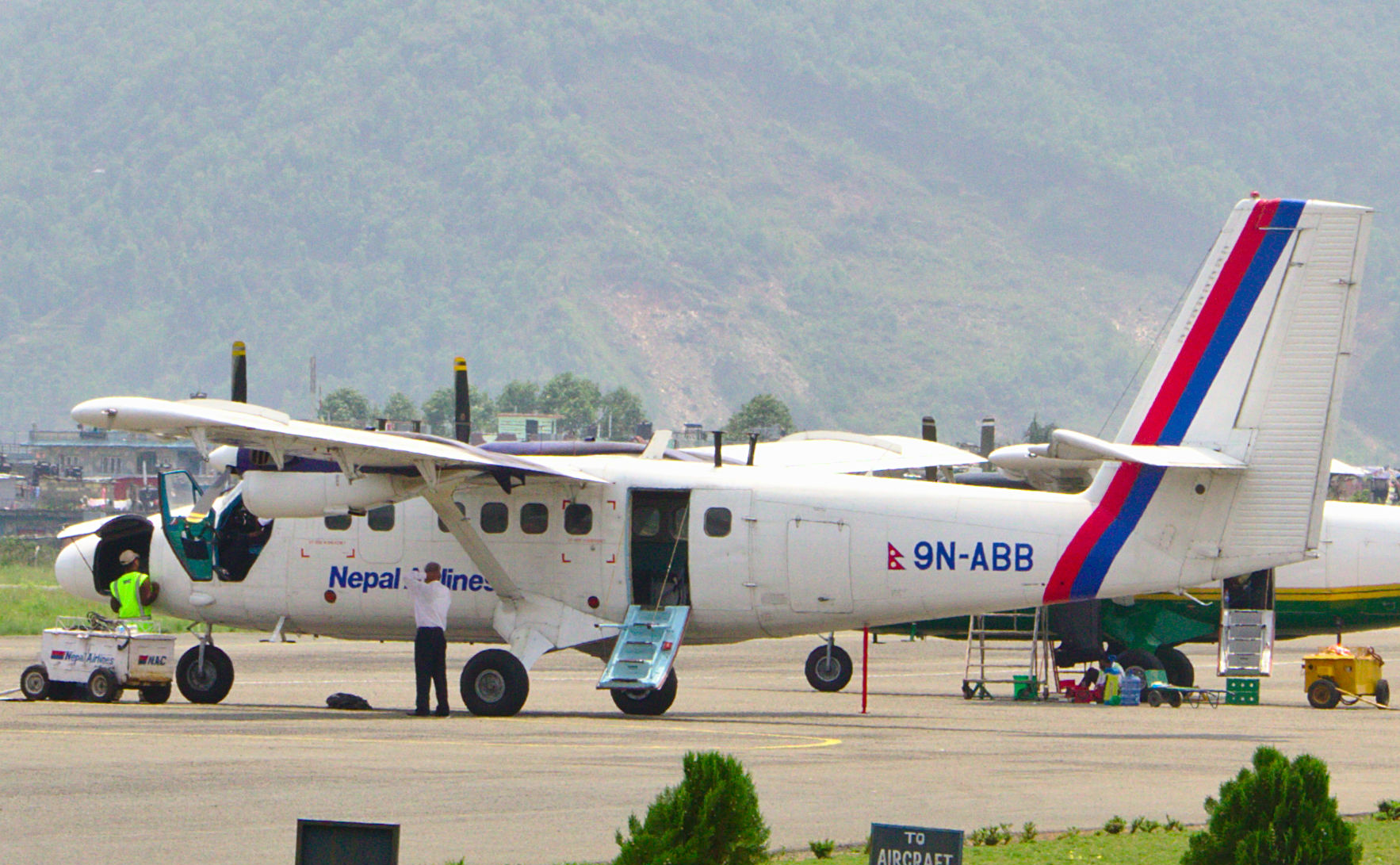
- 9N-ABB, the aircraft involved in the accident, seen in 2013
- Aircraft type: de Havilland Canada DHC-6 Twin Otter
- Operator: Nepal Airlines
- IATA flight No.: RA183
- ICAO flight No.: RNA183
- Call sign: ROYAL NEPAL 183
- Registration: 9N-ABB
- Flight origin: Pokhara Airport, Nepal
- Destination: Jumla Airport, Nepal
- Occupants: 18
- Passengers: 15
- Crew: 3
- Fatalities: 18
- Survivors: 0

Nepal Airlines Flight 183 was a scheduled domestic passenger flight operated by a DHC-6 Twin Otter that on 16 February 2014 crashed into a hill near Dhikura, Nepal killing all 15 passengers and 3 crew members on board. The accident was later attributed to pilot error resulting in a CFIT.

== Accident ==
Location of the crash site in Nepal

The aircraft departed from Pokhara Airport in central Nepal with fifteen passengers and three crew members on board and was scheduled to arrive at Jumla Airport in the northwest of the country at 13:45 Nepal Standard Time (8:00 UTC). Thirty minutes into the flight, the 19-seat Twin Otter was attempting to divert to Bhairahawa Airport because of the weather conditions, resulting in radio contact being lost. The last radio communication with the aircraft crew was at 13:13, when the crew reported their approximate position to Bhairahawa Tower, in Khidim. The aircraft eventually crashed in the jungle of Masine Lek, which is located in Dhikura.

Although the crash itself was not witnessed, some residents saw remains of the crashed aircraft. At first, no one was able to get to the crash site due to poor visibility. When the rescue and recovery teams eventually reached the crash site, they found the bodies of all eighteen on board spread over the hill.

According to Nepal's Army, the crash site is located at an altitude of 7,000 feet (2,100 m). Parts of the wreckage were found as far away as 7 kilometres (4.3 miles) from the actual crash site.

== Aircraft ==
The aircraft, a DHC-6 Twin Otter (Registration: 9N-ABB), which was delivered to Nepal Airlines in 1971, was involved in two incidents before: On 10th June 1973 on a flight from Biratnagar to Kathmandu, the aircraft was taken over by three hijackers of Nepali Congress party who demanded money and escaped after landing in Bihar, India. None of the three crew and 18 passengers were injured. On 5th July 1992, the aircraft lost directional control on takeoff from Jumla on a flight to Surkhet. The aircraft ran off the runway and struck the airport perimeter fence. None of the three crew were injured and there were no passengers on board.

== Passengers and crew ==
According to Civil Aviation Authority of Nepal official Ram Hari Sharma, everybody on board, except for one Danish passenger, were Nepalese, including a child.

== Investigation ==
The Nepalese Government formed a four-man probe team to investigate the crash. The aircraft's flight recorder was taken from the site. The investigation team was expected to report its findings within two months of the crash.

The final report of the investigation was released on 25 August 2014. It found the accident was caused by a lack of crew coordination; a lack of situational awareness on the part of the crew; and the poor weather.
