= Pokharathok =

Pokharathok may refer to:

- Pokharathok, Arghakhanchi - town in Nepal
- Pokharathok, Palpa - village in Nepal
