= Pathona =

Pathona पथोना
- Village development committee
- Location in Lumbini Province Pathona (Nepal)
- Coordinates: 27.87°N 83.31°E
- Country: Nepal
- Zone: Lumbini Zone
- District: Arghakhanchi District

Population (1991)
  - Religions: Hindu
- Time zone: UTC+5:45 (Nepal Time)

Pathona is a small town in Arghakhanchi District in the Lumbini Zone of southern Nepal.
