= Sarai dance =

Dance of Nepal

Saraya dance is a traditional dance performed primarily in western districts of Nepal, including Gulmi, Arghakhanchi, Pyuthan, and Palpa. It is typically held the day after Dashain tika at religious shrines. The dance involves devotees clashing with weapons such as khukuri, swords, and khadga while chanting the Wakkhai Wa. Historically, the dance included physically swinging and displaying these weapons. The dance is known for its rhythmic movements and weapon demonstrations, which have declined in recent years due to safety concerns. However, it remains popular in areas like Dhurkot, Arje, and Isma. The largest performance of the Saraya dance takes place on the full moon day in Arje Phulbari, Gulmi.

== History and mythology ==
Legend has it that the Saraya dance originated after the victory of the gods and goddesses over the giants and demons, with the dance symbolizing the use of weapons in the war. The tradition is tied to rituals performed on the day of Saptami, when an alam (image of God) is taken to the temple or kot after flowers are brought inside. The alam, decorated with colored flags, is placed outside the temple as a symbol of the deity, and daily puja (worship) is conducted.

This ritual may have initially been created to protect valuable statues and weapons. Over time, the Saraya nach evolved into an entertaining dance, particularly performed during Dashain in parts of western Nepal. The dance is practiced in areas such as Gulmi, Arghakhanchi, Palpa, Kapilvastu, Rupandehi, Pyuthan, and Dang, and is typically performed from Ekadashi to Purnima.

Mostly danced in hilly regions, the Saraya dance involves the clashing of weapons such as the khukuri (traditional knife), sword, and khuda (a type of sword), which are offered to the temple along with Panchebaja (traditional musical instruments).

== See also ==
- Dance in Nepal
