= Nuwakot =

Nuwakot may refer to several places:

- Nuwakot District, a district of Nepal
  - Nuwakot 1 (constituency)
  - Nuwakot 2 (constituency)
- Nuwakot, Arghakhanchi, town in Arghakhanchi district, Nepal
- Nuwakot, Nuwakot, town in Nuwakot district, Nepal
- Nuwakot, Western Rukum, former village development committee in Western Rukum district, Nepal
- Kingdom of Nuwakot, a petty kingdom of the Chaubisi Rajya confederation of northern India and Nepal
