= Khilji, Nepal =

Khilji खिल्जी Khiljee
- Village development committee
- Location in Lumbini Province Khilji (Nepal)
- Coordinates: 27.98°N 83.03°E
- Country: Nepal
- Zone: Lumbini Zone
- District: Arghakhanchi District

Population (1991)
  - Total: 2,883
  - Religions: Hindu
- Time zone: UTC+5:45 (Nepal Time)

Khilji or Khiljee (खिल्जी ) is a village in western part of Nepal which is part of Bhumikasthan Municipality of the Arghakhanchi district.

Bhumikasthan Municipality is located in the western part of Nepal under Province# 5. It consists of total 10 wards. below is the latest data for Bhumikasthan municipality.

| Ward No | Name of the Ward | Older VDC Name | Old Ward# |
|---|---|---|---|
| 1 | DhakaBang | Dhakabang | 2, 3, 6, 9 |
| 2 | DhakaBang | Dhakabang | 1, 4, 5, 7, 8 |
| 3 | Dharapani | Dharapani | 6, 7, 8, 9 |
| 4 | Dharapani | Dharapani | 1, 2, 3,4, 5 |
| 5 | Asurkot | Asurkot | 1, 2,3,4,5,6,7,8,9 |
| 6 | Khiljee | Khiljee | 1, 2,3,4,5,6,7,8,9 |
| 7 | Nuwakot | Nuwakot | 1, 5, 7, 8, 9 |
| 8 | Nuwakot | Nuwakot | 2, 3,4,6 |
| 9 | Dhikura | Dhikura | 1,2,3,4,5,6,7,8,9 |
| 10 | Dhanchaur | Dhikura | 1,2,3,4,5,6,7,8,9 |

At the time of the 1991 Nepal census it had a population of 2,883 and had 546 houses in the village. It is one of the most developed villages in Arghakhanchi. The major castes living in this village are Magar, Brahmin (Pokhrel, Belbase, Banjade, Gaire, Damase and Chudali), Chhetri (Basnet, Khatri), Shrestha, Bishwakarma, Pariyar and Sarki.
