= Hansapur =

Hansapur may refer to several places in India

- Hansapur, Patan, an area of East Patan

Hansapur may refer to several places in Nepal:

- Hansapur, Gandaki, a village development committee in Gorkha District
- Hansapur, Kaski, a town and Village Development Committee in Kaski District in the Gandaki Zone
- Hansapur, Lumbini, in Arghakhanchi District in the Lumbini Zone
- Hansapur, Rapti, a Village Development Committee in Pyuthan, a Middle Hills district of Rapti Zone
- Hansapur, Dhanusa, a municipality in Danusha District in Province No. 2
