= Narapani =

Narapani नरपानी
- Location in Lumbini Province Narapani (Nepal)
- Coordinates: 27.91°N 83.17°E
- Country: Nepal
- Zone: Lumbini Zone
- District: Arghakhanchi District

Population (1991)
  - Total: 4,664
  - Religions: Hindu
- Time zone: UTC+5:45 (Nepal Time)

Narapani is a market center in Sandhikharka Municipality of Arghakhanchi District in the Lumbini Zone of southern Nepal. The former village development committee (VDC) was converted into a municipality on 18 May 2014 by merging the existing Sandhikharka, Bangla, Narapani, Khanchikot, Keemadada, Argha and Dibharna VDCs. At the 1991 Nepal census it had a population of 4,664 and had 873 houses in the town.
