= Pali, Nepal =

Pali पाली
- Village development committee
- Location in Lumbini Province Pali (Nepal)
- Coordinates: 27°56′N 83°15′E
- Country: Nepal
- Zone: Lumbini Zone
- District: Arghakhanchi District

Population (1991)
  - Total: 4,016
  - Religions: Hindu
- Time zone: UTC+5:45 (Nepal Time)
- Postal code: 32710

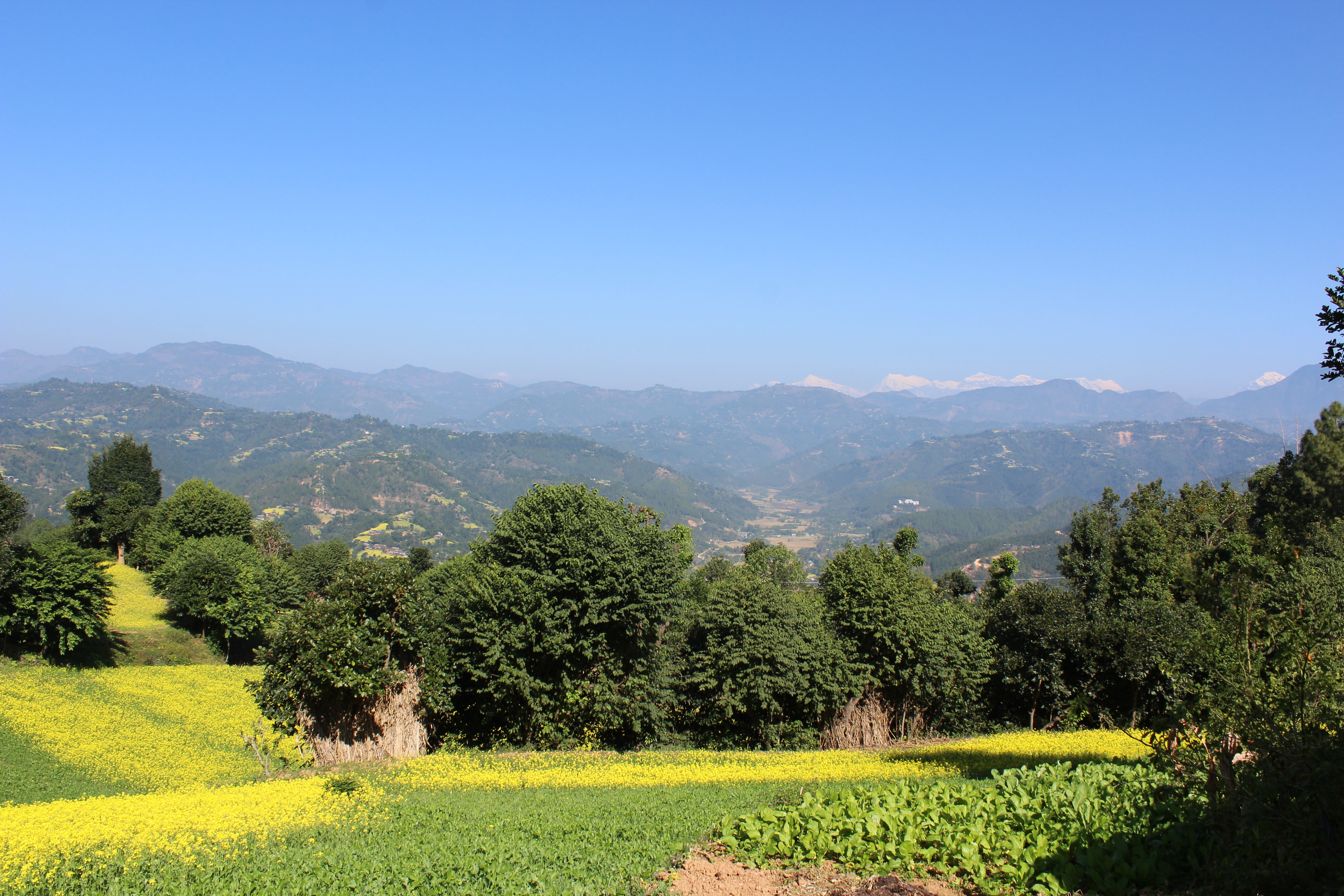
Pali, Nepal

Pali (Nepali: पाली) is one of the wards of Panini Rural Municipality, Arghakhanchi District. It lies in the western part of the municipality. It is surrounded by other wards as:

- Chidika, Khidim in the East
- Adguri in the West
- Maidan in the South
- Balkot, Kerunga in the North
- Sandhikarkha Municipality in the North West
