= Dharapani =

Dharapani may refer to:

- Dharapani, Bheri, Nepal
- Dharapani, Gandaki, Nepal
- Dharapani, Lumbini, Nepal
- Dharampani, Rapti, Nepal
- Dharapani, Sagarmatha, Nepal
