= Simalapani =

Simalapani सिमलपानी
- Village development committee
- Location in Lumbini Province Simalapani (Nepal)
- Coordinates: 27.80°N 83.18°E
- Country: Nepal
- Zone: Lumbini Zone
- District: Arghakhanchi District

Population (1991)
  - Total: 4,387
  - Religions: Hindu
- Time zone: UTC+5:45 (Nepal Time)

Simalapani is a small town in Arghakhanchi District in the Lumbini Zone of southern Nepal. At the time of the 1991 Nepal census it had a population of 4,387 and had 791 houses in the town.
