= Jatjatin Dance =

Jatjatin dance is a traditional dance of Mithila region (spanning present-day southern Nepal and northern Bihar). Jat-Jatin is a duet dance performed by a man and a woman, typically during the monsoon season. The performance depicts the emotional narrative of a couple's impending separation, as the man prepares to depart for work, while the woman, symbolizing sorrow, moves around him with her dupatta fluttering like tears. The dance is accompanied by the rhythmic sounds of the dholak and manjira, and features circular footwork. The lyrics, often plaintive in tone, convey themes of both sorrow and resilience.

== Tradition ==
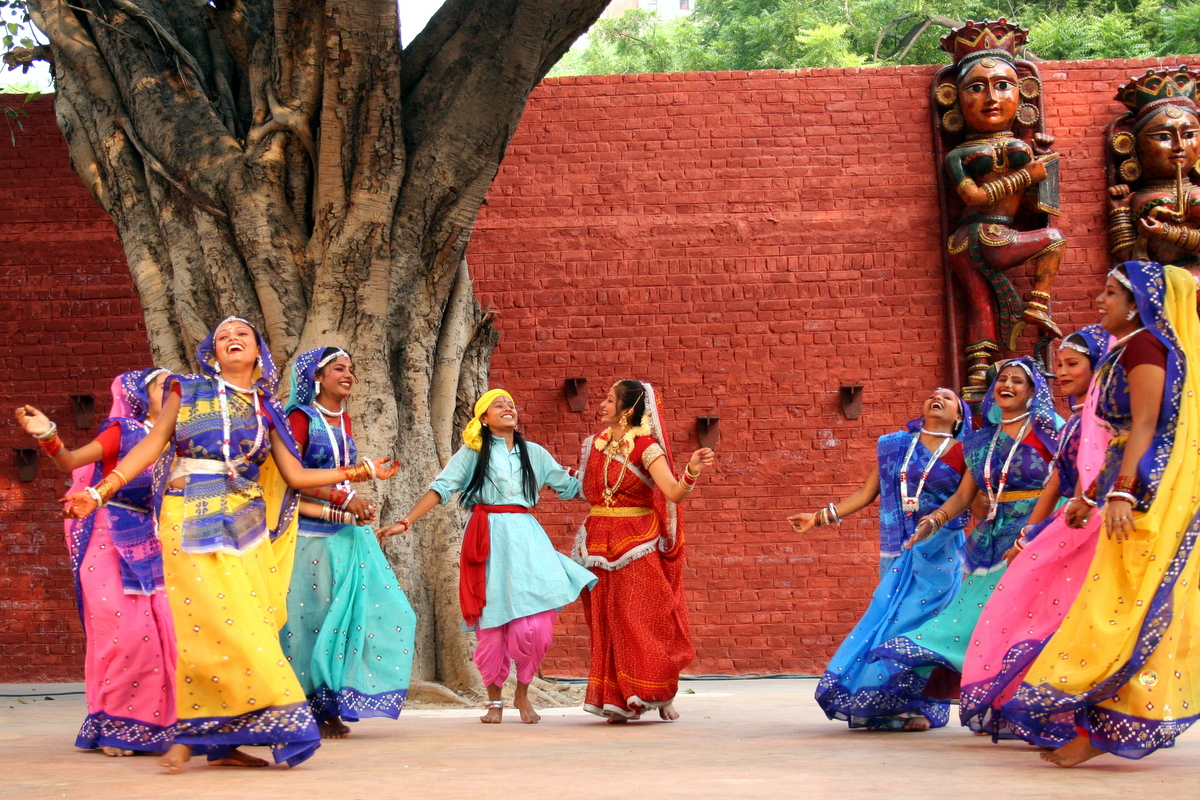
Jatjatin Dance in Mithila region.

The Jat-Jatin dance is a traditional cultural and religious performance from the Mithila region, typically performed by women during times of drought. It is believed to appease Lord Indra, the god of rain, to bring rainfall. The dance is performed at midnight, accompanied by singing Jat-Jatin songs, chanting Vedic mantras, and traditional worship ceremonies. The dance involves expressive footwork and symbolic movements, reflecting the community’s hope for rain. This ritual is part of an ancient Mithila tradition, especially practiced during agricultural crises caused by insufficient rainfall.

== See also ==
- Dance in Nepal
