= Thulo Pokhara =

Coordinates: 28°0′N 83°12′E

ThulaPokhara ठूलापोखरा
- Village development committee
- Location in Lumbini Province ThulaPokhara (Nepal)
- Country: Nepal
- Zone: Lumbini Zone
- District: Arghakhanchi District

Population (1991)
  - Total: 3,469
  - Religions: Hindu
- Time zone: UTC+5:45 (Nepal Time)

Thulo Pokhara is a small town in Arghakhanchi District in the Lumbini Zone of southern Nepal. At the time of the 1991 Nepal census, it had a population of 3,469 and had 711 houses in the town.
