= Sitapur, Arghakhanchi =

Sitapur सितापुर
- City
- Location in Lumbini Province Sitapur (Nepal)
- Coordinates: 27°30′N 83°35′E
- Country: Nepal
- Zone: Lumbini Zone
- District: Arghakhanchi District

Population
  - Religions: Hindu
- Time zone: UTC+5:45 (Nepal Time)

Sitapur is a small town in Arghakhanchi District in the Lumbini Zone of southern Nepal.
