= Tappa dance =

Dance in Nepal

Tappa dance (Nepali: टप्पा) is a traditional dance popular among the Magar community in the Rapti Zone of Nepal, particularly in the Dang District. The dance begins at a slow tempo, gradually accelerating as it progresses toward the end. The rhythm of the dance is driven by the beats of a hand drum, locally known as pappa, which gives the dance its name, Tappa.

== See also ==
- Dance in Nepal
