= Gorkhunga =

Gokhunga गोखुङ्गा
- Village development committee
- Location in Lumbini Province Gokhunga (Nepal)
- Coordinates: 28.08°N 83.02°E
- Country: Nepal
- Zone: Lumbini Zone
- District: Arghakhanchi District

Population (2001)
  - Total: 3,358
  - Religions: Hindu
- Time zone: UTC+5:45 (Nepal Time)

Gokhunga is a village in Arghakhanchi District in the Lumbini Zone of southern Nepal. At the time of the 1991 Nepal census, the village had a population of 2918 living in 605 houses. At the time of the 2001 Nepal census, the population was 3358, of which 49% was literate.
