= Baalan Dance =

Dance of Nepal

Balan Danceh is a traditional dance form that holds particular significance among the Brahmin and Chhetri communities in Nepal. It is typically performed during religious ceremonies, especially during pujas such as Satyanarayan Puja and Bhagwat Puran. The dance is accompanied by musical instruments, most notably the khaijadi (a traditional drum), which provides the rhythmic foundation for the performance.

During the Balan Naach, participants sing bhajans and devotional songs dedicated to various Hindu deities, including Krishna, Ram, and Vishnu. In addition to the musical and vocal elements, the dance also incorporates theatrical performances, which add a dramatic and expressive layer to the ritual. This dance form plays a significant role in Nepal’s folk traditions, serving both as a religious offering and a means of preserving cultural heritage.

== Origin ==
The term Balan comes from the Sanskrit word Balak, meaning "child." In Nepali, written in Devanagari script, Balan has a similar meaning. The word Bala refers to childhood, and Balan is derived from Bala and Aayan. Just as the story of Ram is called the Ramayan, the story of Balan could be referred to as Balayan. Essentially, Balan represents a form of joy or pleasure that is experienced in old age.

== Dance ==
Balan can be sung and danced by people in rural areas whenever they are free from work, often spontaneously and at any time. However, it is especially performed on specific religious occasions such as Yakadashi, Chandi Purnima, Balachaturdashi, as well as during Satya Narayan Pooja, Saptaha Puran, and other religious festivals.

The performances typically involve narrations from epic stories like the Ramayan, Mahabharat, Krishna Charitra, Bhagawat Geeta, and the Dasabatar. These stories, along with the roles and implements of the characters, are particularly practiced by Brahmin and Kshatriya communities. The dance and singing are done in rhythmic order, with participants joining in groups, creating a lively and joyful atmosphere.

== See also ==
- Dance in Nepal
