= Dibharna =

Dibharna डिभर्ना
- Location in Lumbini Province Dibharna (Nepal)
- Coordinates: 28.01°N 83.15°E
- Country: Nepal
- Zone: Lumbini Zone
- District: Arghakhanchi District

Population (2001)
  - Total: 6,990
  - Religions: Hindu
- Time zone: UTC+5:45 (Nepal Time)

Dibharna is a market center in Sandhikharka Municipality of Arghakhanchi District in the Lumbini Zone of Western Nepal. The former village development committee (VDC) was converted into a municipality on 18 May 2014 by merging the existing Sandhikharka, Bangla, Narapani, Khanchikot, Keemadada, Argha and Dibharna VDCs. At the 1991 Nepal census, the town had a population of 4,490 living in 841 houses. At the 2001 Nepal census, the population was 6,990, of which 56% was literate.
