= Sorathi Nritya =

Dance of Nepal

Sorathi dance is a traditional dance of the Magar community in Nepal and Sikkim. It is performed as part of the larger Sorathi folklore, which combines song, music, and storytelling. The dance is believed to be prehistoric and deeply rooted in Magar cultural traditions.

== Dance tradition ==
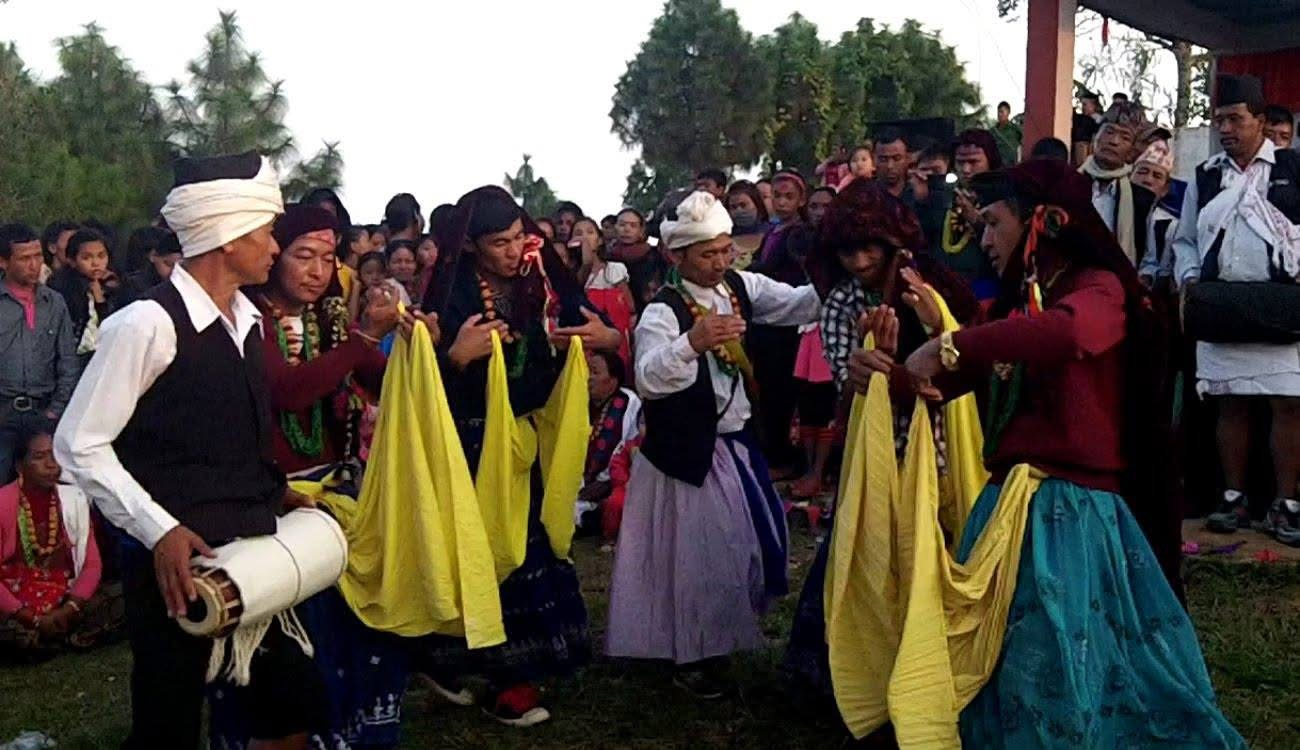
Nepali people enjoying Sorathi dance

Magars perform the Sorathi dance for about two weeks, beginning from Laxmi Puja during the Tihar festival and continuing until Thuli Ekadashi, usually in November. The dance takes place in open courtyards, often at the house of the village head, where community members gather to watch and participate.

The performance follows the narrative of Queen Sorathi and is accompanied by traditional musical instruments, rhythmic drumbeats, and songs that set the tone for each scene. Dancers wear colorful Magar costumes and ornaments, moving in graceful yet powerful patterns that reflect emotion, storytelling, and devotion. The coordination of dance, music, and song brings the story to life, blending celebration with cultural remembrance.

Although Sorathi originated among the Magars, it has become popular among other ethnic groups such as the Gurungs, Tharus, Darais, and Kumals. In different regions, the dance is known by various names, including Nachanya, Karang Dance, Maruni, Nachari, and Pangdure. Each version carries slight differences in rhythm, movement, and style.

== History and mythology ==
A long time ago, there lived a kind king named Jayasinge. Although he was good and just, he had no children. After marrying fourteen queens, he still remained childless even at the age of forty. The king performed many religious rituals and sacrifices, but none brought him a child. Saddened, he decided to give up his throne.

His wise minister, Sujan, then advised him to marry Princess Heamaiti of Baidame. She became his fifteenth queen, and soon they were blessed with a baby girl. The king was overjoyed and called a soothsayer named Jaishi to predict the child’s future. But Jaishi, bribed by the jealous queens, declared that the baby would bring misfortune to the king and the kingdom. Fearing disaster, the king was persuaded to abandon the newborn. He ordered a goldsmith to make a golden trunk, placed the baby inside, and had it floated down the river.

Downstream, two villagers named Malare and Kumale found the golden trunk while fishing. Inside was the beautiful baby girl. They divided their find—Malare took the trunk, and Kumale took the baby. Childless and kind, Kumale and his wife raised her with love and named her Sunrupa, meaning “golden-faced.”

Sixteen years later, during a hunting trip, King Jayasinge met the grown-up Sunrupa and was struck by her beauty, not knowing she was his own daughter. When he tried to marry her, she stopped him, revealing the truth. Shocked, the king realized his mistake and joyfully welcomed his long-lost daughter, now known as Queen Sorathi, back to the palace. The deceitful soothsayer was punished and banished from the kingdom.

== See also ==
- Dance in Nepal
