= Pancha Buddha Dance =

Dance of Nepal

Pancha Buddha Dance (Nepali:पञ्च बुद्ध नृत्य) is a central ritual dance performed by the Shakyas in the Kathmandu Valley in Nepal, especially during significant Buddhist festivals.

This dance honors the Pancha (Five) Buddhas, each representing different aspects of Buddhist philosophy and spiritual enlightenment. The five Buddhas are:

- Vairochana (the Brilliant One)
- Aksobhaya (the Unshakeable)
- Ratnasambhava (the Matrix of the Jewel)
- Amitabha (the Infinite Light)
- Amoghasiddhi (the Infallible Realization)

During the performance, dancers wear costumes in the distinctive colors associated with each Buddha and embody their specific postures and symbolic attributes. The dance is a devotional act, reflecting the qualities of each Buddha and their significance in Vajrayana Buddhism. It is performed to invoke blessings, spiritual enlightenment, and the protection of the Buddhas during major religious events and festivals in the valley.

== See also ==
- Dance in Nepal
