= Pathauti =

Patauti पटौटी
- Village development committee
- Location in Lumbini Province Patauti (Nepal)
- Coordinates: 27.87°N 83.26°E
- Country: Nepal
- Zone: Lumbini Zone
- District: Arghakhanchi District

Population (1991)
  - Total: 3,194
  - Religions: Hindu
- Time zone: UTC+5:45 (Nepal Time)

Patauti is a small town in Arghakhanchi District in the Lumbini Zone of southern Nepal. At the time of the 1991 Nepal census it had a population of 3,194 and had 614 houses in the town.
