= Argha =

Argha अर्घा
- Location within Lumbini Province Location within Nepal
- Coordinates: 28.02°N 83.11°E
- Country: Nepal
- Province: Lumbini Province
- District: Arghakhanchi District

Population (1991)
  - Total: 5,947
  - Religions: Hindu
- Time zone: UTC+5:45 (Nepal Time)

Argha is a Market Center in Sandhikharka Municipality of Arghakhanchi District in Lumbini Province of southern Nepal. Its fort (kot) was the centre of a former Chaubisi kingdom, the Kingdom of Argha, which was annexed to Nepal in 1786. The former village development committee (VDC) was converted into a municipality on 18 May 2014 by merging the existing Sandhikharka, Wangla, Narapani, Khanchikot, Keemadada, Argha and Dibharna VDCs. At the 1991 Nepal census, the town had a population of 8,248 living in 1,712 houses. At the 2001 Nepal census, the population was 5,947, of which 60% was literate.
