= Bhagavathi, Nepal =

Coordinates: 28.04°N 83.22°E

- Village development committee
- Location in Lumbini Province Bhagavathi, Nepal (Nepal)
- Country: Nepal
- Zone: Lumbini Zone
- District: Arghakhanchi District

Population (2001)
  - Total: 4,543
  - Religions: Hindu
- Time zone: UTC+5:45 (Nepal Time)

Bhagavathi is a small town in Arghakhanchi District in the Lumbini Zone of southern Nepal. At the time of the 1991 Nepal census, the town had a population of 4418 living in 842 houses. At the time of the 2001 Nepal census, the population was 4543, of which 59% was literate.
