= Dhakawang =

Dhakawang ढाकावाङ, अर्घाखाँची
- Former Village development committee
- Location in Lumbini Province Dhakawang (Nepal)
- Coordinates: 28.04°N 83.00°E
- Country: Nepal
- Zone: Lumbini Zone
- District: Arghakhanchi District

Population (2001)
  - Total: 7,042
  - Religions: Hindu
- Time zone: UTC+5:45 (Nepal Time)

Dhakawang is a small town in Arghakhanchi District in the Lumbini Zone of southern Nepal. At the time of the 1991 Nepal census, the town had a population of 6229 living in 1165 houses. At the time of the 2001 Nepal census, the population was 7042, of which 53% was literate.
