= Chhatraganj =

Chhatraganj, Arghakhanchi छत्रगञ्ज
- Village development committee
- Location in Lumbini Province Chhatraganj, Arghakhanchi (Nepal)
- Coordinates: 28.01°N 83.23°E
- Country: Nepal
- Zone: Lumbini Zone
- District: Arghakhanchi District

Population (2001)
  - Total: 3,073
  - Religions: Hindu
- Time zone: UTC+5:45 (Nepal Time)

Chhatraganj is a village in Arghakhanchi District in the Lumbini Zone of southern Nepal. At the time of the 1991 Nepal census, the village had a population of 2927 living in 578 houses. At the time of the 2001 Nepal census, the population was 3073, of which 58% was literate. There is a high school named Shree Sarbajanik Ma Vi that was established in 1958 (2015 according to the Nepali calendar). It celebrated its golden jubilee year in 2009 (2065 according to the Nepali calendar).
