= Sandhikharka =

Sandhikharka सन्धिखर्क
- City
- Skyline of Sandhikharka

- Location in Lumbini Province Sandhikharka (Nepal)
- Coordinates: 28°0′3″N 83°14′48″E
- Country: Nepal
- Province: Lumbini Province
- District: Arghakhanchi District

Government
  - Mayor: Kamal Prasad Bhusal (NC)
  - Deputy Mayor: Thakur Kumar BK (NCP)
- Elevation: 960 m (3,150 ft)

Population (2011)
  - Total: 40,422
  - Religions: Hindu Muslim Buddhist
- Time zone: UTC+5:45 (NST)
- Postal code: 32700
- Area code: 077
- Website: sandhikharkamun.gov.np

Sandhikharka Municipality (Nepali: सन्धिखर्क नगरपालिका) is the headquarter of Arghakhanchi District which lies in Lumbini Province of Nepal. The former village development committee (VDC) was converted into a municipality on 18 May 2014 by merging the existing Sandhikharka, Wangla, Narapani, Khanchikot, Kimadada, Argha and Dibharna VDCs. It is located, in a valley surrounded by hills, in the western part of the capital, Kathmandu.

== Geography ==
Sandhikharka is situated between the two hills Argha and Khanchi, from which the district's name is derived. Sandhikharka has made a significant progress in road building and the training of people through various national and international non-governmental organisations. Although Sandhikharka is a small town, in recent years migration to developed countries has increased, with migrants sending billions of remittance to their families every year. Development of new houses, privately own luxury vehicles and the modern atmosphere itself have shown that the town has marvellously progressed in terms of economy and other sectors.

Three small rivers; the Bangi, Ghoche and Bhadri merge at Chutrabeshi, within Sandhikharka. Therefore, people sometimes call the rivers Tribeni. There is one pitched road that connects to the national highway at Gorusinghe. However Arghakhanchi district was the first district in Nepal where all the VDCs were officially linked with the motorable roads.

Sandhikharka is located around 960 meters above sea level. The climate changes from season to season. During summer, the maximum temperature reaches about 37 °C which can be significantly warm for some visitors and in the winter season the temperature is usually between 1-10 °C. In summer the rainfall is high hills in winter the surrounding higher hills remain cold and sometimes are covered in snow.

== History ==
=== Background ===
Many years ago the region was fully covered by the wild grasses called "Kharka". Farmers used to bring their cattle to graze on the land. This area was a border of two small kingdoms i.e. Argha and Khanchi during Chaubisi rajya (24 principalities). There was always conflict about the ownership of the land between the two monarchs of this place. Later, in the interest of public welfare, the kings decided to make a treaty between the two little kingdoms. Treaty is the English translation of Sandhi which means a formally concluded and ratified agreement between states. The two states created the treaty for the land of "Kharka" which eventually led to the name of Sandhikharka, the headquarter of Arghakhanchi district.

=== Attack during Maoist insurgency ===
On September 8, 2002, the town was involved in a massive battle between the government forces and "thousands" of Maoists, reportedly led by the two most wanted terrorists of that time Top Bahadur Rayamajhi and Pampha Bhusal who come from the district. Heavily armed rebels engaged the bases of civilian police, armed police and the Royal Nepalese Army and overpowered them following a few hours of gunbattle. They torched all government buildings except the hospital, most never being rebuilt. About 50 policemen and 70 rebels were killed in the night-long battle, with almost 36 police injured. However, doubts remain over how many of the dead were actually Maoists. A second attack was launched on September 10, 2002, in which guerillas killed at least 65 security personnel, including soldiers, through 12 hours of fighting. Forty-one personnel were reported as injured in this attack. A telecommunication tower was destroyed as a result of the second attack, and reinforcements were rushed in by helicopter as well as a government-sponsored effort to hold the town. Unnamed leaders said lack of communication and a failed response from authorities which led to the government's defeats. CNN speculated that these attacks were aimed at disrupting the upcoming election by forcing the Nepali government to impose a state of emergency.

=== 2005 Maoist attack ===
Maoists launched a third attack on March 4, 2005. This operation backfired, and the Nepali military killed 30 Maoists in what BBC called "one of the bloodiest clashes since the royal coup." There were no casualties of troops. After forcing rebels into retreat, the military recovered "some crude bombs, terrorist documents and equipment used to operate mines". Despite his military's success, King Gyanendra of Nepal imposed a state of emergency, detained political party leaders and imposed censorship of the press. Nepal's military released a statement on the fighting:

On 4 March, terrorists... fled after strong resistance by the security forces. In the action, about 30 terrorists are estimated to have been killed and some injured.

== Demographics ==
At the time of the 1991 Nepal census it had a population of 8921. It had 6703 married people, with 185 having more than one spouse as of that census. Sandhikharka had 7706 literate people, and 2272 were attending school as of that census. This high literacy rate once drew people from outside Arghakhanchi District to Sandhikharka for its good schools.

== Education ==
"'Shree Janajyoti Higher Secondary School"' and "'Shree Bhagawati Secondary School"' are two of the oldest public schools in Sandhikharka.

The first English boarding school was "'Tribeni English Boarding School"' in Chutrabesi Sandhikharkha, which was established in 1981 by a man called Indra Gopal. After successfully running for few years, they shut down its operation due to poor management problems. Later, some existing members of Tribeni school formed another school called "Himali Children Academy" which produced multiple reputable scholars. In the private sector '"Sandhikharka Green English Boarding School","Arghakhanchi Higher Secondary boarding School","Motherland English Boarding School" and "Gauri Shankar English boarding School"' have been able to hold a reputation to provide quality education. "'Panini Multiple Campus"' is the first and oldest college affiliated by Tribhuvan university in this district, founded by Mr. Gyan Hari Acharya. This college runs graduate and undergraduate courses covering various sectors of education.

=== Closure of schools ===
In October 2004, the Maoists ordered the closure of all private schools in Sandhikharka, as well as the rest of Arghakhanchi District. This came a year after they promised to keep the schools open if they cut their tuition fees by at least 20 percent, which was what occurred. According to schoolchild Pratiba Acharya, "Maoists thought that only rich people study in boarding schools like mine, so they want to close them." Further, they destroyed schools who were operated by their enemies and those they disagreed with, after trying to change their curricula was to no avail. Many students were sent to public schools, which teach in Nepali. This posed two problems. For one thing, Nepali, though widely spoken and understood, is not invariably the mother tongue of all students in multilingual, multi-ethnic Nepal. In addition, private school students are accustomed to English as the primary medium of instruction.

== Government ==
The purpose of Village Development Committees is to organise village people structurally at a local level and creating a partnership between the community and the public sector for improved service delivery system. A VDC has a status as an autonomous institution and authority for interacting with the more centralised institutions of governance in Nepal. In doing so, the VDC gives village people an element of control and responsibility in development, and also ensures proper utilization and distribution of state funds and a greater interaction between government officials, NGOs and agencies. The village development committees within a given area will discuss education, water supply, basic health, sanitation and income and will also monitor and record progress which is displayed in census data.

In VDCs there is one elected chief, usually elected with over an 80% majority. From each ward, there is also a chief that is elected along with these there are also four members elected or nominated.

== Media ==
There are 4 radio stations, 1 community television and few local newspapers published weekly. The List of Newspaper, F.M and TV is follow:

1. Arghakhanchi.Com news portal Since 2006,
2. Radio Arghakhanchi,
3. Radio Deurali,
4. Naya F.M,
5. Suryodaya F.M and
6. Arghakhanchi Television
7. Sandhikharka F.M,
