= Juluke =

Jaluke जलुके
- Village development committee
- Location in Lumbini Province Jaluke (Nepal)
- Coordinates: 27.91°N 82.96°E
- Country: Nepal
- Zone: Lumbini Zone
- District: Arghakhanchi District

Population (2011)
  - Total: 6,142
  - Religions: Hindu
- Time zone: UTC+5:45 (Nepal Time)
- Postal code: 32706

Jaluke (जलुके) is a small town in Arghakhanchi District in the Lumbini Zone of southern Nepal. At the time of the 2011 Nepal census it had a population of 6,142 and had 1242 houses in the town. It is located approximately 234 km/145 mi from the Nepal's capital, Kathmandu.
