= Kerunga =

Kerunga केरूङ्गा
- Village development committee
- Location in Lumbini Province Kerunga (Nepal)
- Coordinates: 27.98°N 83.23°E
- Country: Nepal
- Zone: Lumbini Zone
- District: Arghakhanchi District

Population (1991)
  - Total: 4,650
  - Religions: Hindu
- Time zone: UTC+5:45 (Nepal Time)

Kerunga is a small town in Arghakhanchi District in the Lumbini Zone of southern Nepal. At the time of the 1991 Nepal census it had a population of 4,650 and had 965 houses in the town.
