= Bangla, Nepal =

Wangla, Nepal वाङ्ला Sandhikharka Municipality 4-5
- City
- Location in Lumbini Province Wangla, Nepal (Nepal)
- Country: Nepal
- Zone: Lumbini Zone
- District: Arghakhanchi District

Population (2001)
  - Total: 5,380
  - Religions: Hindu
- Time zone: UTC+5:45 (Nepal Time)

Wangla is a Market Center in Sandhikharka Municipality of Arghakhanchi District in the Lumbini Zone of southern Nepal. The former village development committee (VDC) was converted into a municipality on 18 May 2014 by merging the existing Sandhikharka, Wangla, Narapani, Khanchikot, Keemadada, Argha and Dibharna VDCs. At the 1991 Nepal census, the town had a population of 5,142 living in 1,033 houses. At the 2001 Nepal census, the population was 5,380, of which 66% was literate.
