= Kimadanda =

Kimadanda किमाडाँडा
- Location in Lumbini Province Kimadanda (Nepal)
- Coordinates: 28.00°N 83.08°E
- Country: Nepal
- Zone: Lumbini Zone
- District: Arghakhanchi District

Population (2001)
  - Total: 3,514
  - Religions: Hindu
- Time zone: UTC+5:45 (Nepal Time)

Kimadanda is a market center in Sandhikharka Municipality of Arghakhanchi District in the Lumbini Zone of Western Nepal. The former village development committee (VDC) was converted into a municipality on 18 May 2014 by merging the existing Sandhikharka, Bangla, Narapani, Khanchikot, Kimadada, Argha and Dibharna VDCs. At the 1991 Nepal census, the town had a population of 5,430 living in 1,085 houses. At the 2001 Nepal census, the population was 3,514, of which 53% was literate.
