= Bangi, Iran =

Bangi (Persian: بنگي) may refer to:

- Bangi, East Azerbaijan
- Bangi, Hormozgan
