= Khanchikot =

Khanchikot कान्छीकोट
- Location in Lumbini Province Khanchikot (Nepal)
- Coordinates: 27°56′N 83°07′E
- Country: Nepal
- Zone: Lumbini Zone
- District: Arghakhanchi District

Population (1991)
  - Total: 4,628
  - Religions: Hindu
- Time zone: UTC+5:45 (Nepal Time)

Khanchikot is a market center in Sandhikharka Municipality of Arghakhanchi District. The district lies in the Lumbini Zone of Western Nepal. The former village development committee (VDC) was converted into a municipality on 18 May 2014 by merging the existing Sandhikharka, Bangla, Narapani, Khanchikot, Keemadada, Argha and Dibharna VDCs. At the 1991 Nepal census it had a population of 4,628 individuals and had 930 houses.

== Climate ==
Climate data for Khanchikot, elevation 1,801 m (5,909 ft), (1991–2020 normals)
Month	Jan	Feb	Mar	Apr	May	Jun	Jul	Aug	Sep	Oct	Nov	Dec	Year
Mean daily maximum °C (°F)	14.2 (57.6)	16.1 (61.0)	19.8 (67.6)	23.3 (73.9)	24.4 (75.9)	24.4 (75.9)	23.5 (74.3)	23.9 (75.0)	23.5 (74.3)	22.0 (71.6)	19.1 (66.4)	15.9 (60.6)	20.8 (69.5)
Daily mean °C (°F)	9.4 (48.9)	11.0 (51.8)	15.3 (59.5)	18.8 (65.8)	20.2 (68.4)	20.9 (69.6)	20.4 (68.7)	20.7 (69.3)	20.0 (68.0)	17.8 (64.0)	14.6 (58.3)	11.4 (52.5)	16.7 (62.1)
Mean daily minimum °C (°F)	4.5 (40.1)	5.8 (42.4)	10.8 (51.4)	14.3 (57.7)	15.9 (60.6)	17.3 (63.1)	17.3 (63.1)	17.5 (63.5)	16.5 (61.7)	13.5 (56.3)	10.0 (50.0)	6.9 (44.4)	12.5 (54.5)
Average precipitation mm (inches)	26.9 (1.06)	35.4 (1.39)	30.2 (1.19)	36.6 (1.44)	105.7 (4.16)	280.0 (11.02)	495.1 (19.49)	390.0 (15.35)	269.2 (10.60)	67.2 (2.65)	12.5 (0.49)	23.6 (0.93)	1,772.4 (69.77)
Source 1: Department of Hydrology and Meteorology
Source 2: JICA (precipitation)
