= Subarnakhal =

Subarnakhal सुवर्णखाल
- Former Village development committee
- Location in Lumbini Province Subarnakhal (Nepal)
- Coordinates: 27.86°N 83.18°E
- Country: Nepal
- Zone: Lumbini Zone
- District: Arghakhanchi District

Government
  - Ward Chairman: Man Bahadur Sinjapati

Population (1991)
  - Total: 3,020
  - Religions: Hindu
- Time zone: UTC+5:45 (Nepal Time)

Subarnakhal is a small village in Arghakhanchi District in the Lumbini Zone of western Nepal. At the time of the 1991 Nepal census it had a population of 3,020 and had 556 houses in the town.
