= Dance in Nepal =

Aspect of Nepalese culture

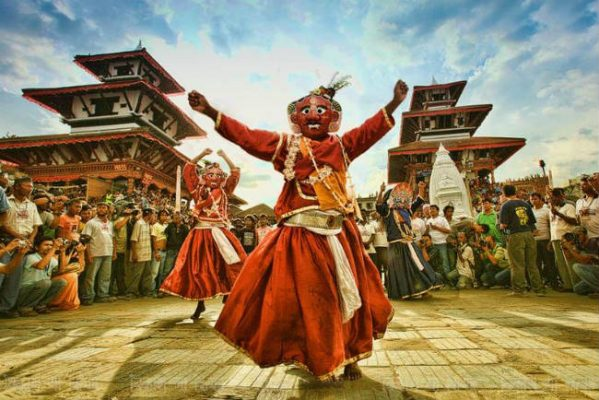
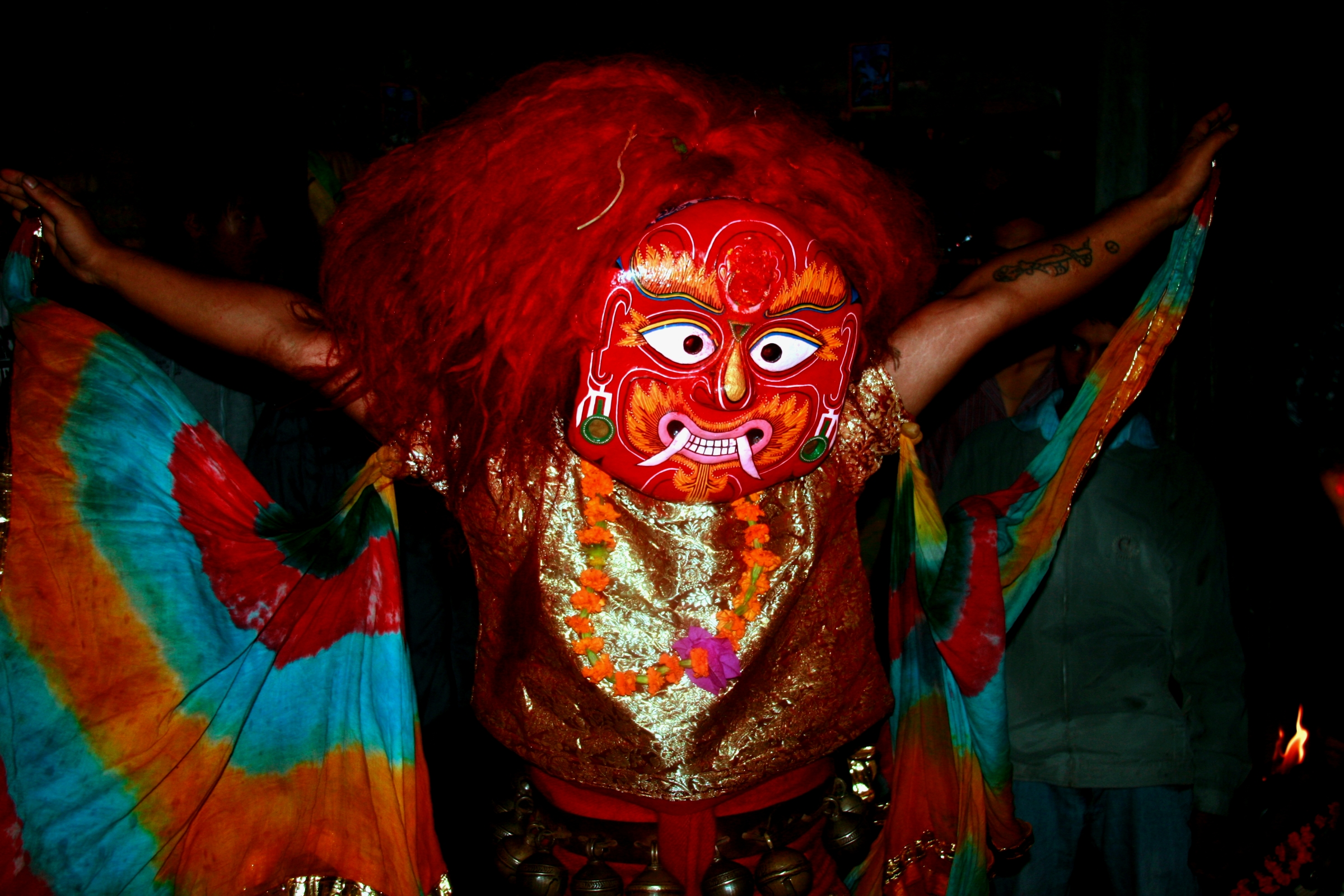
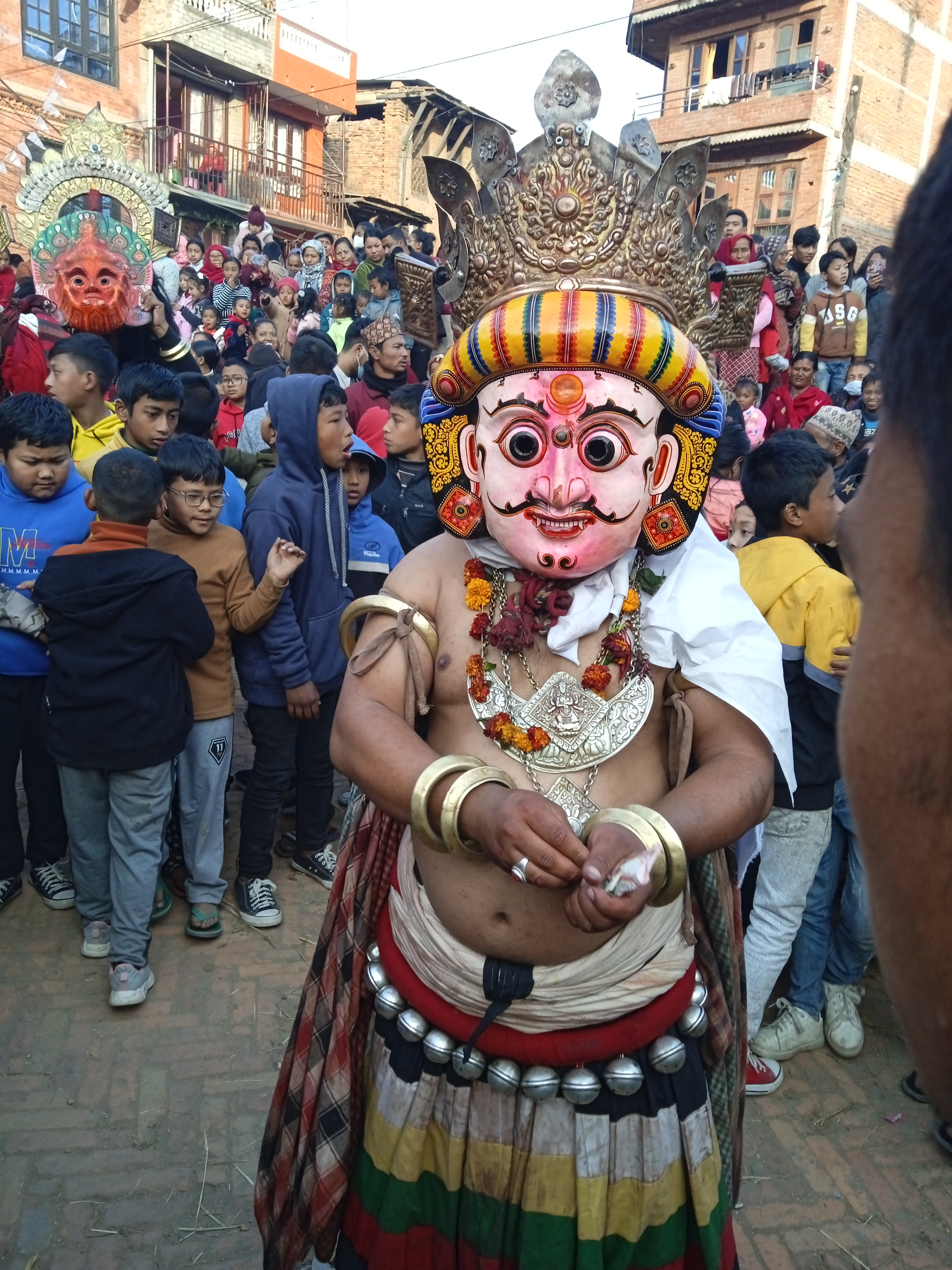
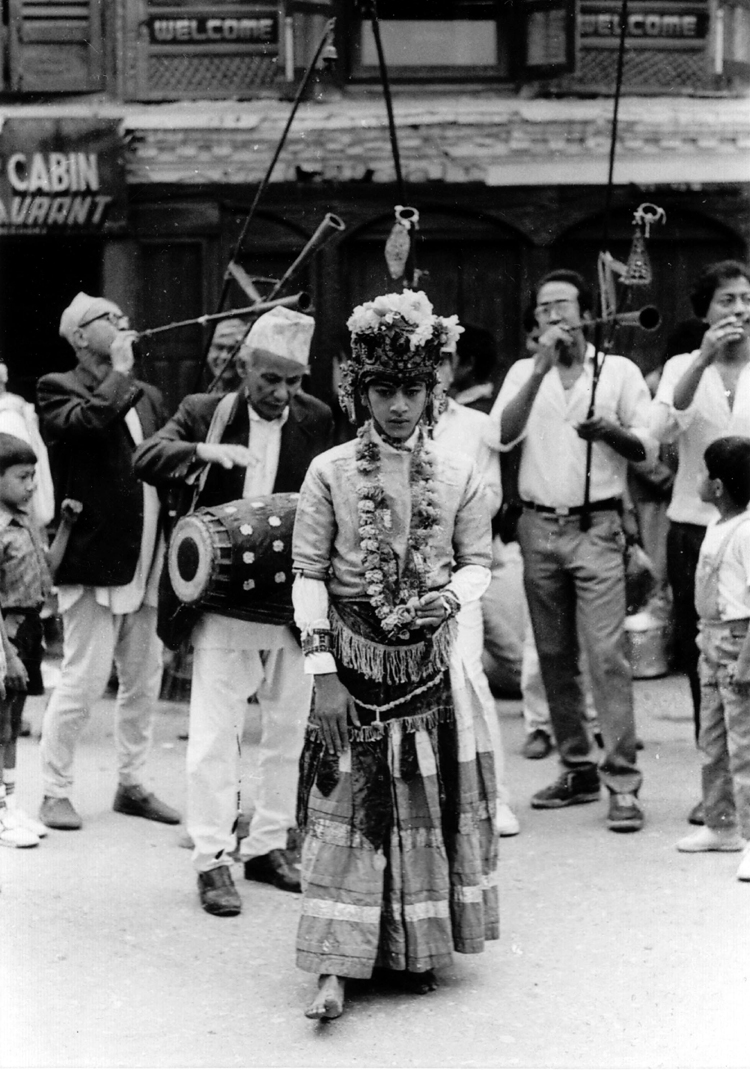
Nepalese dances. Clockwise from upper left: Sawabhakku dance, Majipa Lakhey dance, Kumha Pyakhan dance, and Shweta Bhairava Dance.

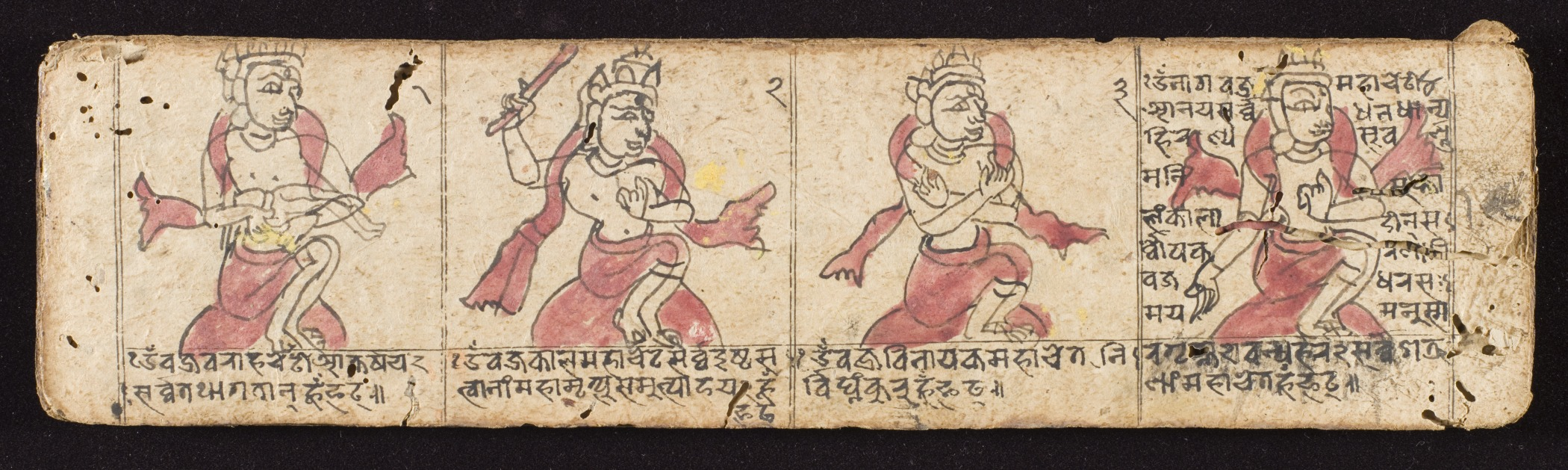
Manual for Ritual Dances written in Newar script, 1730 CE

Dance (Nepal Bhasa:प्याखं/प्याखङ, Nepali: नृत्य/ नाच) in Nepal is a performing art form consisting of purposefully selected sequences of human movement. It comprises numerous styles, including folk, ethnic, and classical to modern dances.

== Origin ==
Legends state that dances in this country originated in the abode of Lord Shiva — the Himalayas, where he performed the tandava dance. This indicates that dance traditions of Nepal are very ancient and unique. With altitudes and ethnicity, the dances of Nepal slightly change in style as well as in the costumes.

== Ethnic and cultural dances ==
- Bhairab Pyakhan: popular among Newar community in Kathmandu Valley.
- Kumha Pyakhan: is a sacred dance of the Tuladhar and Kansakar caste groups of the Newars of Kathmandu. The dance is performed in temple and market squares during religious festivals.
- Lakhey Pyakhan: performed during the Yenya festival in the month of September.
- Nava Durga Pyakhan: starts from mohani and ends in Bhagasti. It is famous around Newar community in Bhaktapur.
- Pancha Buddha Dance
- Gathu Pyakhan: is a sacred masked dance of the Newar people of the Kathmandu Valley, Nepal.
- Kartik Naach: is a Hindu dance performed by the Newar people of Lalitpur, in the month of Kartik.
- Baalan Dance: It is performed by depicting the character of Lord Ram and Lord Krishna etc. especially by brahmin and Chhetri community.
- Chyabrung Naach: the traditional dance of the Limbu people, living mainly in the Eastern part of Nepal.
- Deuda naach: popular in Karnali and far-west provinces.
- Dhan Nach: the traditional dance of the Limbu people, living mainly in the Eastern part of Nepal.
- Dishka Dance: performed at weddings, includes intricate footwork and arm movements.
- Gauna Dance: It belongs to the Mithila tradition and is popular in the Janakpur region and is performed on religious and festive occasion.
- Ghatu Nritya: performed among the Gurung community in western Nepal.
- Hurra Dance: performed by Eastern Magar community
- Hanuman Nritya: Popular in central Nepal
- Jhijhiya Dance: popular in the western and central Terai among Maithili community and some Bhojpuri communities of Madhesh province. Women put holey earthen pot with fire inside, on their head and dance in a group during Dashain.
- Jatjatin Dance: It is based on folk songs of Maithili and Tharu community which they perform from Shrawan Purnima to Bhadra Purnima. It is based on the love story of hero jat and heroine Jatin and their lives.
- Lathi Nach: It is also known as Tharu stick dance and is mainly performed during the Dashain festival.
- Maruni Dance: traditional dance popular in Eastern Nepal, Sikkim, Assam, and Darjeeling, popular among Magar, Gurung, Kirati and It is believed to be originated from Magar Army during 14 the century on the behalf of sick King Balihang Rana Magar of Palpa, Pokhara Butwal.
- Mayur Naach; Peacock Dance: performed by western magar specially Kham Magar, popular in the Mid-Western part of Nepal, especially Rolpa and Rukum.
- Mandhum dance: Performed by Kirat people of eastern Nepal.
- Sarai dance
- Sakela Naach: the traditional dance of the Khambu (Rai) community worshipping Lord Paruhang and Goddess Sumnima.
- Sorathi Nritya: performed among the Gurung and Magar community in western Nepal.
- Sakhiya dance: It is a traditional dance of Tharu community performed during the Dashain and Tihar festivals by the unmarried young girls and boys.
- Syabru Dance: It is a folk dance of Sherpa and other Himalayan communities of Nepal.
- Tappa dance

== Folk dances ==
- Tamang Selo dance
- Jhaure dance
- Lakhey nach dance
- Newari dance
- Manjushree dance
- Kaura dance
- Majhi nach dance
- Raute dance
- Chhokara dance
- Khyali dance
- Maruni dance
- Deuda dance
- Chaulo dance
- Dhan Nach dance
- Madikhole dance
- Phagu (dance)
- Sorathi
- Sakela (Chandi)
- Singaru
- Tarbare
- Bajrayogini dance
- Charitra dance
- Jat-jatin
- Charya dance
- Hanuman dance

== Gallery ==
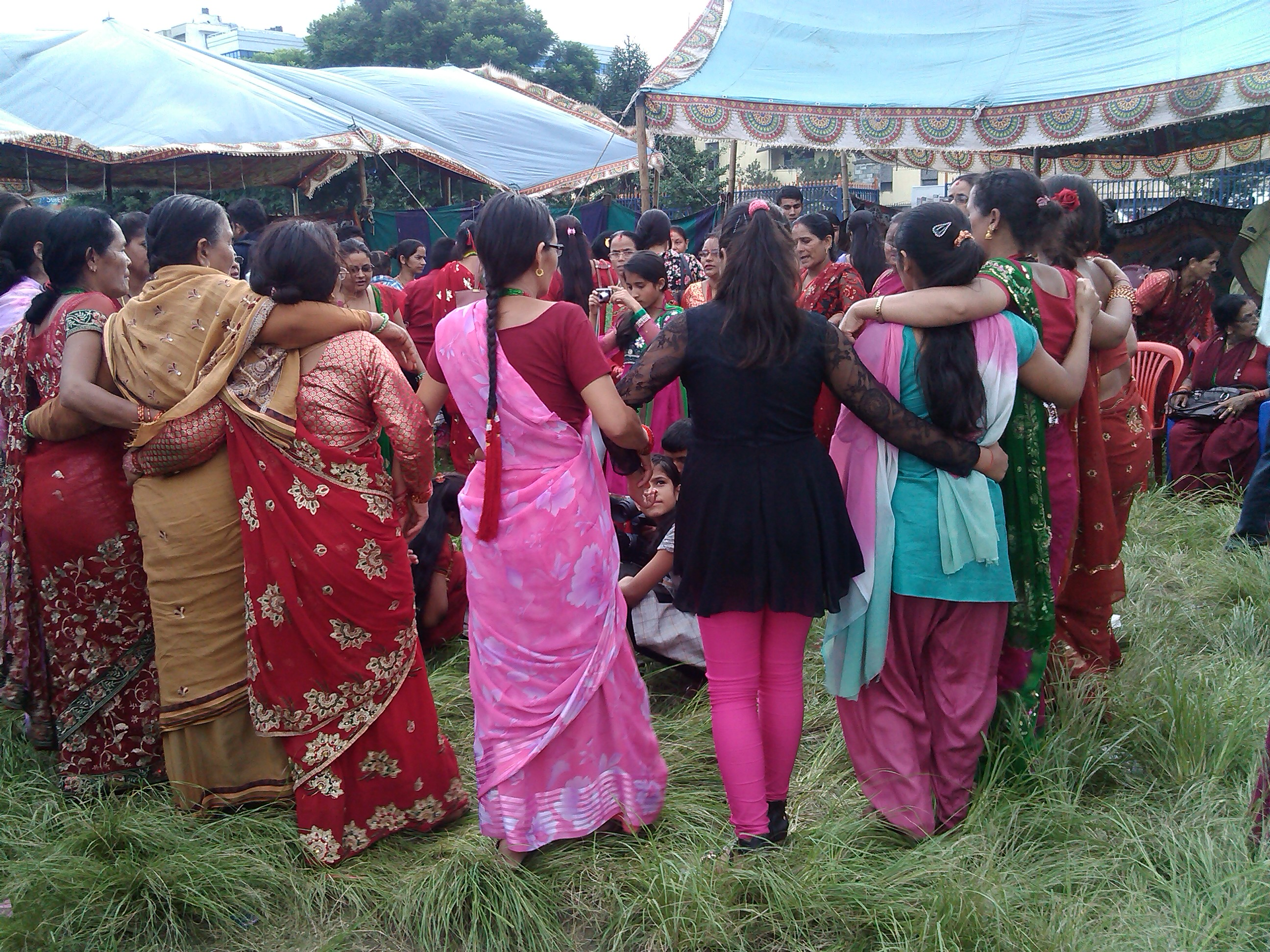
People performing Deuda dance in Tudikhel, Kathmandu

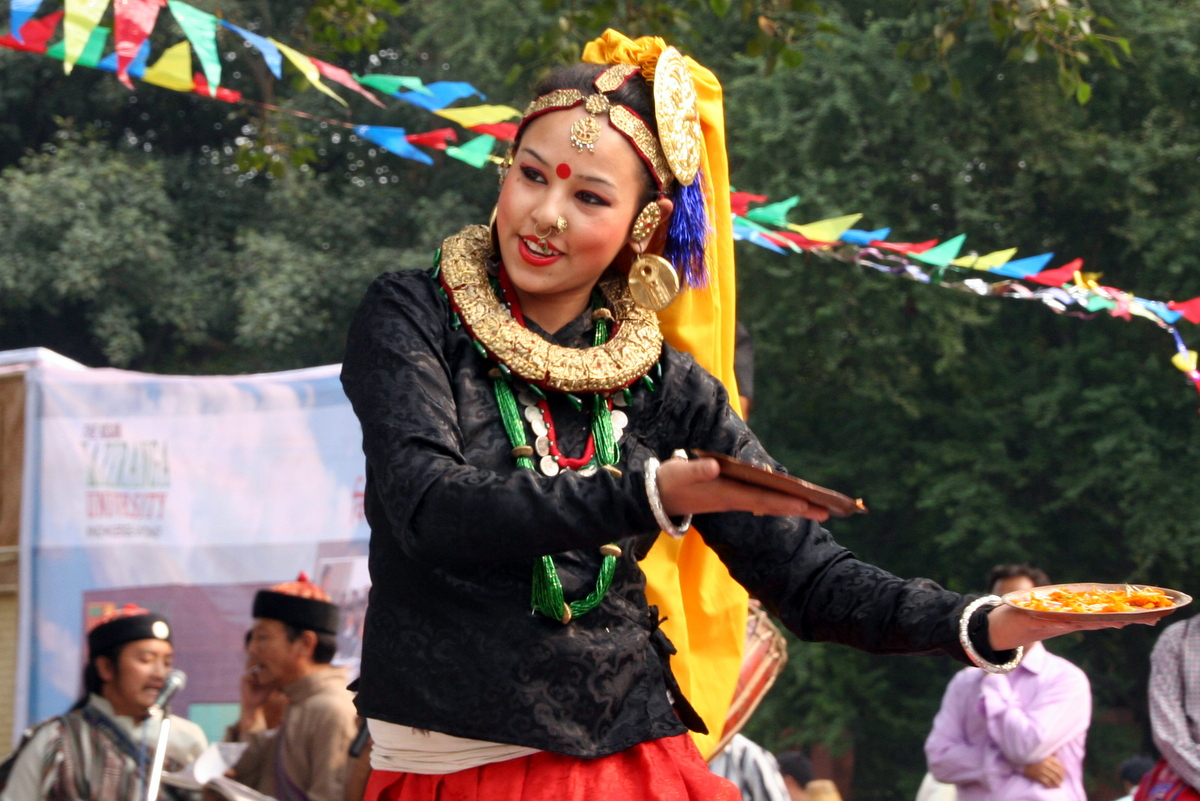
Maruni dancer

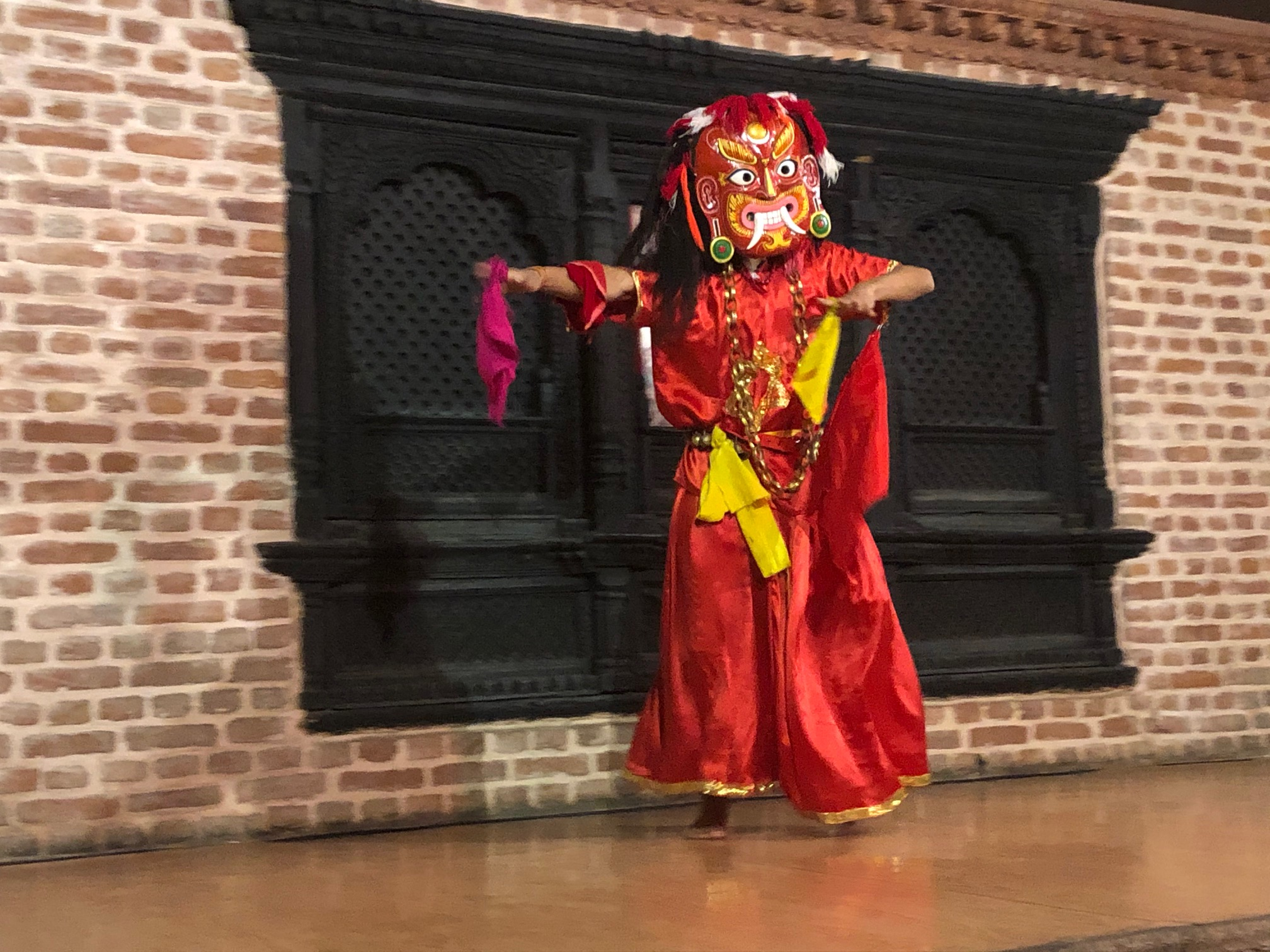
Lakhey dance

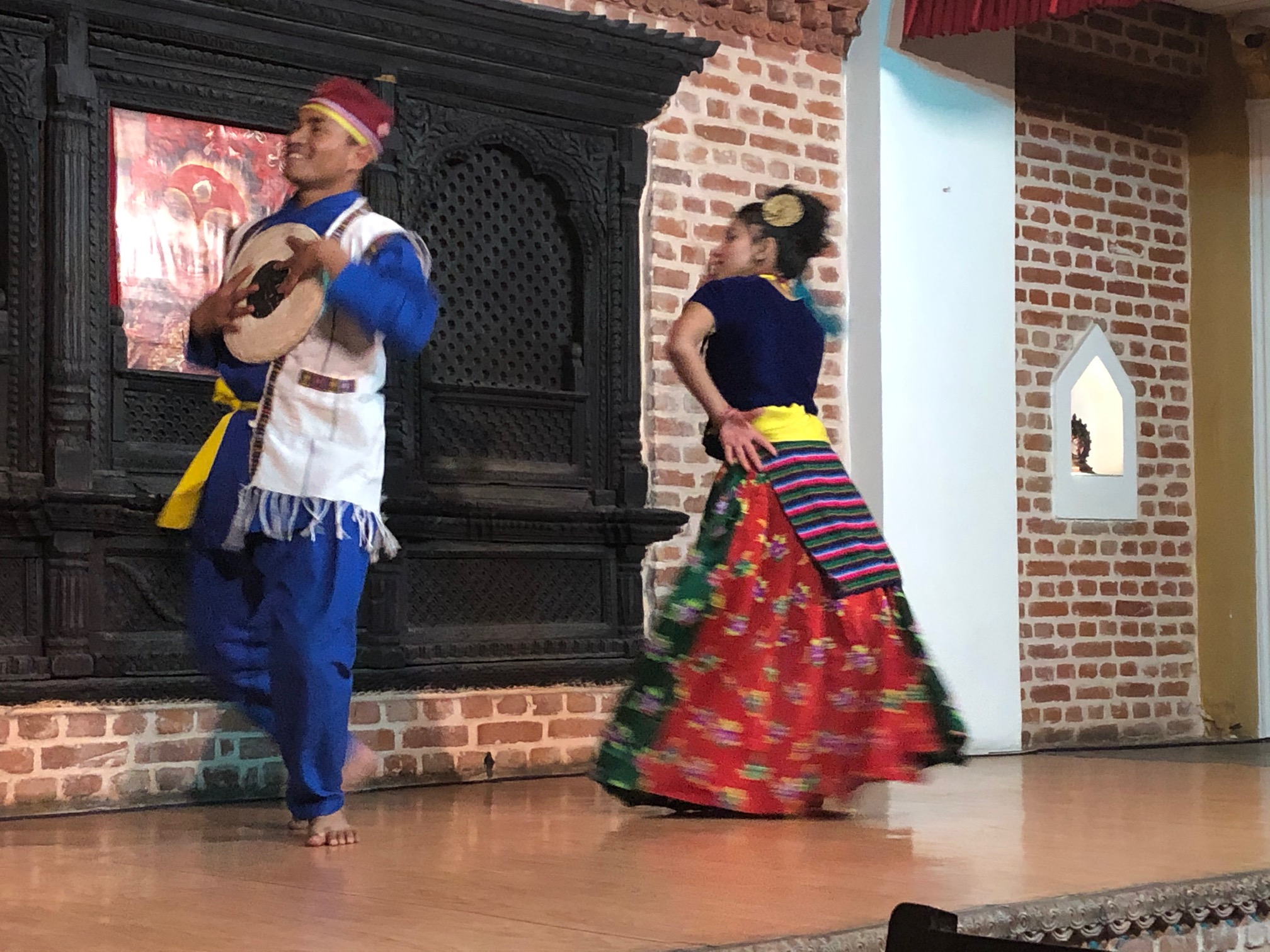
Tamang selo dance

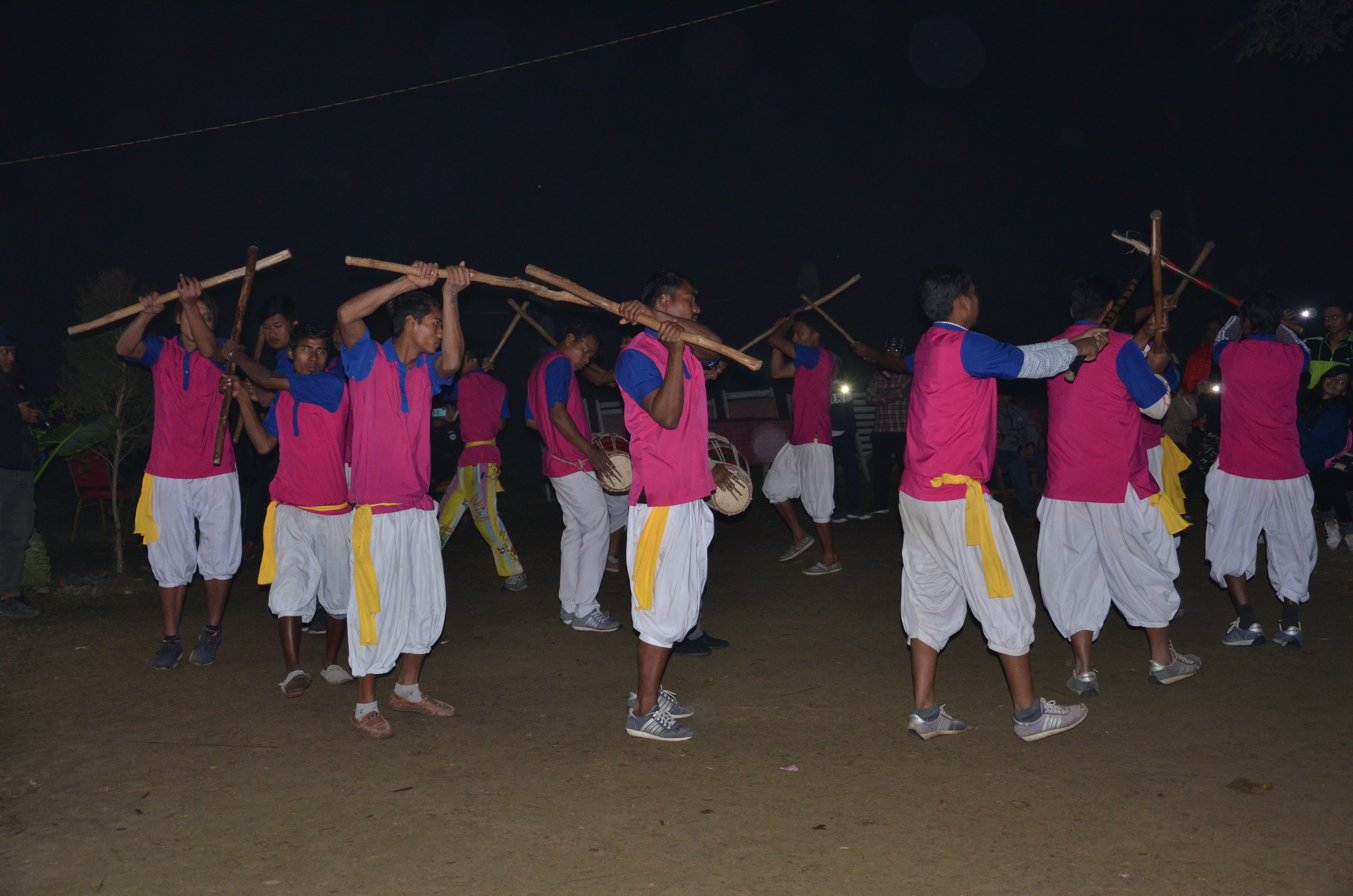
Lathi nach, folk dance of Tharu community

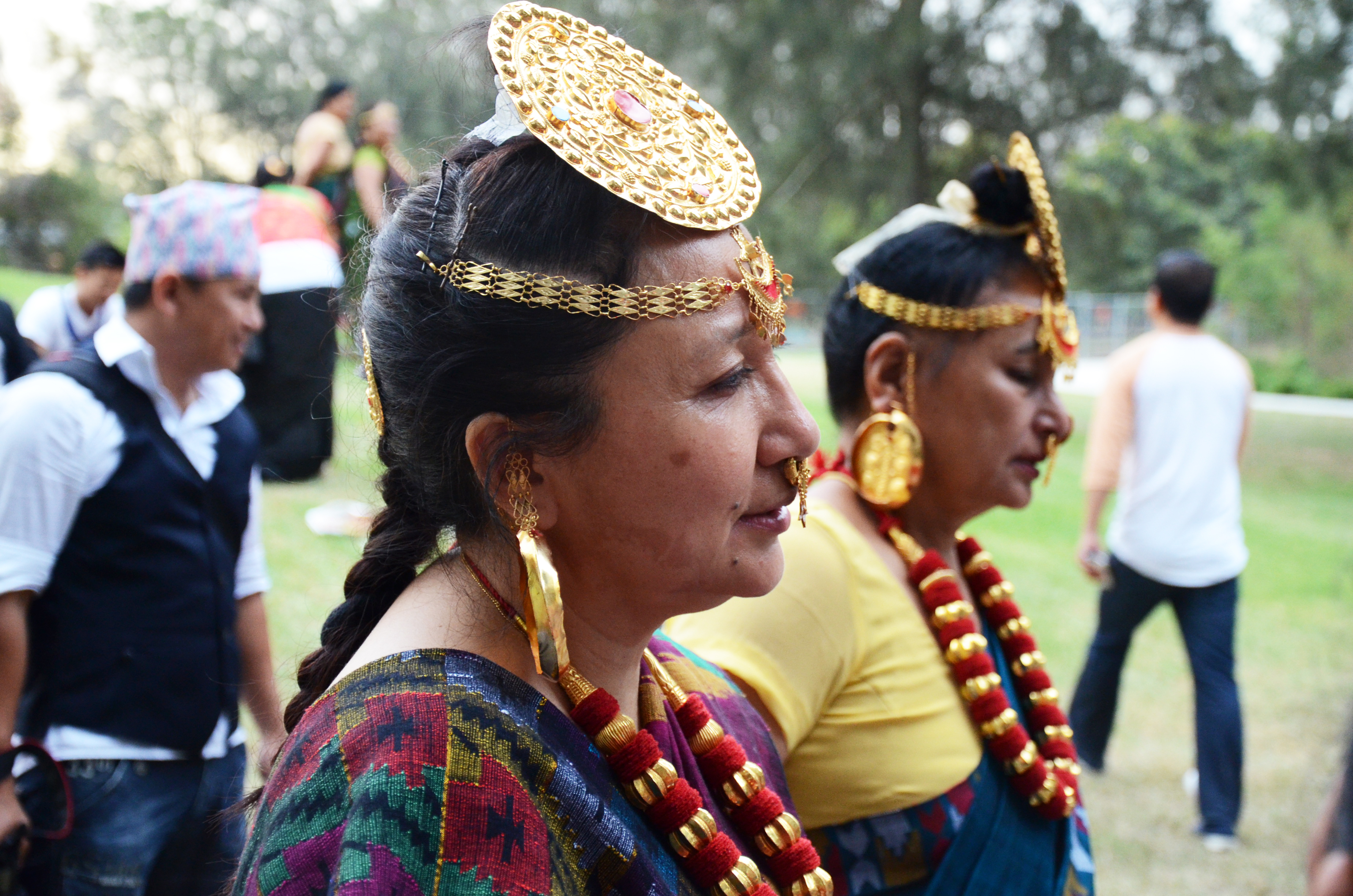
Kelang, Limbu folk dance

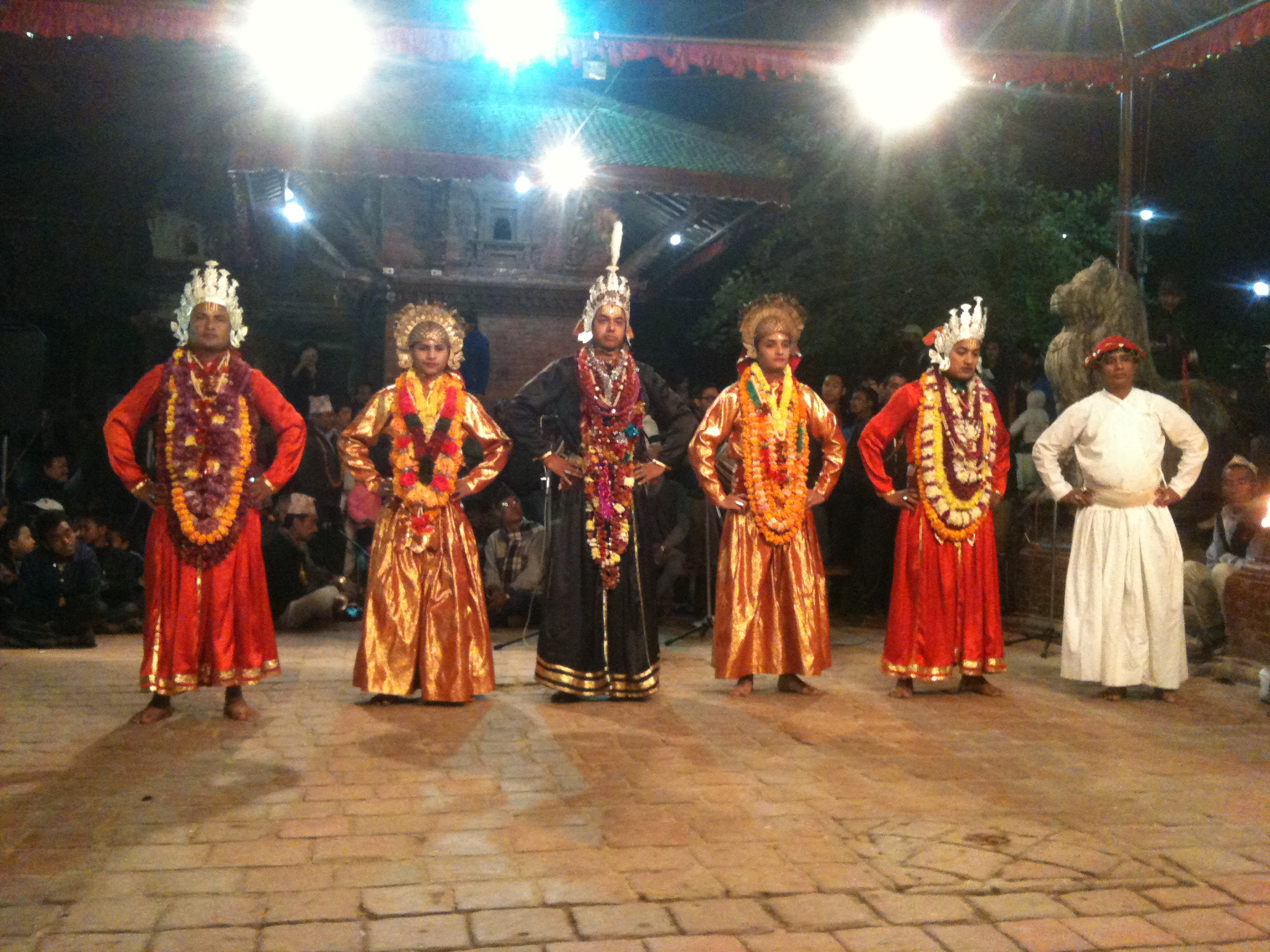
Kartik Nach, a 17th century dance form performed in Patan

== See also ==
- Culture of Nepal
- Music of Nepal
