= Siddhara =

Siddhara सिद्वारा
- Village development committee
- Location in Lumbini Province Siddhara (Nepal)
- Coordinates: 27.84°N 82.92°E
- Country: Nepal
- Zone: Lumbini Zone
- District: Arghakhanchi District

Population (1991)
  - Total: 7,126
  - Religions: Hindu
- Time zone: UTC+5:45 (Nepal Time)

Siddhara is a small town in Arghakhanchi District in the Lumbini Zone of southern Nepal. At the time of the 1991 Nepal census it had a population of 7,126 and had 1,182 houses in the town.
