= Nuwakot, Arghakhanchi =

Nuwakot, Arghakhanchi नुवाकोट
- Village development committee
- Location in Lumbini Province Nuwakot, Arghakhanchi (Nepal)
- Coordinates: 27.97°N 83.06°E
- Country: Nepal
- Zone: Lumbini Zone
- District: Arghakhanchi District

Population (1991)
  - Total: 6,127
  - Religions: Hindu
- Time zone: UTC+5:45 (Nepal Time)

Nuwakot is a small town in Arghakhanchi District in the Lumbini Zone of southern Nepal. At the time of the 1991 Nepal census it had a population of 6,127 and had 1158 houses in the town.
