= Bunji-ye Maski =

Bunji-ye Maski بونجي مسكي
- Village
- Location within Iran
- Coordinates: 25°53′47″N 57°18′50″E
- Country: Iran
- Province: Hormozgan
- County: Jask
- Bakhsh: Central
- Rural District: Kangan

Population (2006)
  - Total: 583
- Time zone: UTC+3:30 (IRST)
  - Summer (DST): UTC+4:30 (IRDT)

Bunji-ye Maski (Persian: بونجي مسكي, also Romanized as Būnjī-ye Maskī and Būnjī Meskī; also known as Bangi, Bānjī, Banjī Meskī, Bonjī, and Būnjī) is a village in Kangan Rural District, in the Central District of Jask County, Hormozgan Province, Iran. At the 2006 census, its population was 583, in 97 families.
