= Bangi, Nepal =

Bangi, Nepal बाँगी
- Village development committee
- Location in Lumbini Province Bangi, Nepal (Nepal)
- Coordinates: 28.05°N 83.10°E
- Country: Nepal
- Province: Lumbini Province
- District: Arghakhanchi District

Population (2001)
  - Total: 5,382
  - Religions: Hindu
- Time zone: UTC+5:45 (Nepal Time)

Bangi is a small town in Arghakhanchi District in Lumbini Province of southern Nepal. At the time of the 1991 Nepal census, the town had a population of 4171 living in 858 houses. At the time of the 2001 Nepal census, the population was 5382, of which 59% was literate.
