= Pokharathok, Arghakhanchi =

Coordinates: 27°53′N 83°17′E

Pokharathok पोखराथोक
- City
- Location in Lumbini Province Pokharathok (Nepal)
- Country: Nepal
- Zone: Lumbini Zone
- District: Arghakhanchi District

Population (1991)
  - Total: 3,373
  - Religions: Hindu
- Time zone: UTC+5:45 (Nepal Time)

Pokharathok is a small town in Arghakhanchi District in the Lumbini Zone of southern Nepal. At the time of the 1991 Nepal census it had a population of 3,373 and had 622 houses in the town.
