= Mareng =

Mareng Mareng
- Village development committee
- Location in Lumbini Province Mareng (Nepal)
- Coordinates: 28.07°N 83.19°E
- Country: Nepal
- Zone: Lumbini Zone
- District: Arghakhanchi District

Population (1991)
  - Total: 4,102
  - Religions: Hindu
- Time zone: UTC+5:45 (Nepal Time)

Mareng is a village development committee in the Arghakhanchi District of the Lumbini Zone of southern Nepal. At the time of the 1991 Nepal census it had a population of 4,102 and had 782 houses in the town.
