= Asurkot =

Asurkot असुरकोट
- Village development committee
- Location in Lumbini Province Asurkot (Nepal)
- Coordinates: 28.00°N 82.99°E
- Country: Nepal
- Province: Lumbini Province
- District: Arghakhanchi District

Population (2001)
  - Total: 2,464
  - Religions: Hindu
- Time zone: UTC+5:45 (Nepal Time)

Asurkot is a village in Arghakhanchi District in Lumbini Province of western Nepal. At the time of the 1991 Nepal census, the village had a population of 2500 living in 434 houses. At the time of the 2001 Nepal census, the population was 2464, of which 58% was literate. The village is farwest village of Arghakhanchi district.
