= Thada =

Thada ठाडा
- Village development committee
- Location in Lumbini Province Thada (Nepal)
- Coordinates: 27.83°N 83.07°E
- Country: Nepal
- Zone: Lumbini Zone
- District: Arghakhanchi District

Population (1991)
  - Total: 7,765
  - Religions: Hindu
- Time zone: UTC+5:45 (Nepal Time)

Thada is a small town in Arghakhanchi District in the Lumbini Zone of southern Nepal. At the time of the 1991 Nepal census it had a population of 7,765 and had 1468 houses in the town.
