= Hansapur, Arghakhanchi =

Coordinates: 28°5′N 83°5′E

Hansapur हंसपुर
- City
- Interactive map of Hansapur
- Country: Nepal
- Zone: Lumbini Zone
- District: Arghakhanchi District

Population (2001)
  - Total: 8,103
  - Religions: Hindu
- Time zone: UTC+5:45 (Nepal Time)

Hansapur is a small town in Arghakhanchi District in the Lumbini Zone of southern Nepal. At the time of the 1991 Nepal census, the town had a population of 7407 living in 1458 houses. At the time of the 2001 Nepal census, the population was 8103, of which 53% was literate.
