= Arghatos =

Arghatosh अर्घातोस
- Village development committee
- Location in Lumbini Province Arghatosh (Nepal)
- Coordinates: 28.04°N 83.19°E
- Country: Nepal
- Province: Lumbini Province
- District: Arghakhanchi District

Population (2001)
  - Total: 4,627
  - Religions: Hindu Buddies Muslim
- Time zone: UTC+5:45 (Nepal Time)
- Postal code: 32700

Arghatosh is a small town is Chhatradev Municipality in Arghakhanchi District in Lumbini Province of southern Nepal. At the time of the 2024 Nepal census, the town had a population of 3570 living in 887 houses. At the time of the 2024 Nepal census, the population was 3570, of which 97 % was literate.
