= Khidim =

Khidim खिदिम
- Village development committee
- Location in Lumbini Province Khidim (Nepal)
- Coordinates: 27.91°N 83.28°E
- Country: Nepal
- Zone: Lumbini Zone
- District: Arghakhanchi District

Population (1991)
  - Total: 3,394
  - Religions: Hindu
- Time zone: UTC+5:45 (Nepal Time)

Khidim is a small town in Arghakhanchi District in the Lumbini Zone of southern Nepal. At the time of the 1991 Nepal census it had a population of 3,394 and had 654 houses in the town.
