= Dharapani, Arghakhanchi =

Dharapani धारापानी
- Village development committee
- Location in Lumbini Province Dharapani (Nepal)
- Coordinates: 28.02°N 83.04°E
- Country: Nepal
- Zone: Lumbini Zone
- District: Arghakhanchi District

Population (2001)
  - Total: 6,455
  - Religions: Hindu
- Time zone: UTC+5:45 (Nepal Time)

Dharapani is a small town in Arghakhanchi District in the Lumbini Zone of southern Nepal. At the time of the 1991 Nepal census, the town had a population of 5236 living in 1020 houses. At the time of the 2001 Nepal census, the population was 6455, of which 65% was literate.
