= Bangi (surname) =

Bangi is a surname originating from the Gujarat Surat district of India. The name Bangi is believed to have derived from a term for individuals who call fellow Muslims to mosque to perform prayer known as giving Azaan. Many Kokan Muslims in Maharashtra and people in other beliefs have this surname. In Piplol and Rajewadiv (Maharashtra) there are more than 5000 Konkanis with Bangi as surname.
