= Adguri =

Place in Nepal

Adguri अड्गुरी
- Village development committee
- Location in Nepal Adguri (Nepal)
- Coordinates: 27.93°N 83.19°E
- Country: Nepal
- Province: Lumbini Province
- District: Arghakhanchi District

Population (2001)
  - Total: 4,409
  - Religions: Hindu
- Time zone: UTC+5:45 (Nepal Time)

Adguri is a small town in the Arghakhanchi District in Lumbini Province, of southern Nepal. At the time of the 1991 Nepal census, the town had a population of 4174 living in 804 household. At the time of the 2001 Nepal census, the population had increased to 4409, of which 57% was literate.
