= Pokharathok, Palpa =

BoughaPokharathok बौघापोखराथोक
- Village development committee
- Interactive map of BoughaPokharathok
- Coordinates: 27.842223°N 83.597986°E
- Country: Nepal
- Zone: Lumbini Zone
- District: Palpa District

Population (1991)
  - Total: 2,238
- Time zone: UTC+5:45 (Nepal Time)
- Postal code: 32500
- Area code: 075

BoughaPokharathok is a village development committee in Palpa District in the Lumbini Zone of southern Nepal. At the time of the 1991 Nepal census it had a population of 2238 people living in 432 individual households.
