= Khana, Arghakhanchi =

Khana (नेपाली: खन) is a village in northern part of Arghakhanchi district, now the village comes under Malarani rural municipality ward No. 4. The village lies in between Bangi, Dibharna, Khanadaha villages. The Khana Gufa (Khana Cave) and Jalkada hills are tourist destinations in this village. Badachaur, Makhata, Badhunga. Lamdanda, Lutipokari lie in this Village, Nepal.
