= Dhanchaur =

Dhanchour धनचौर
- Village development committee
- Location in Lumbini Province Dhanchour (Nepal)
- Coordinates: 27.93°N 83.05°E
- Country: Nepal
- Zone: Lumbini Zone
- District: Arghakhanchi District

Population (2001)
  - Total: 3,992
  - Religions: Hindu
- Time zone: UTC+5:45 (Nepal Time)

Dhanchour is a small town in Arghakhanchi District in the Lumbini Zone of southern Nepal. At the time of the 1991 Nepal census, the town had a population of 3529 living in 648 houses. At the time of the 2001 Nepal census, the population was 3992, of which 33% was literate.
