= Chidika =

Chidika चिदिका
- Village development committee
- Location in Lumbini Province Chidika (Nepal)
- Coordinates: 27.95°N 83.28°E
- Country: Nepal
- Zone: Lumbini Zone
- District: Arghakhanchi District

Population (2001)
  - Total: 3,886
  - Religions: Hindu Muslim
- Time zone: UTC+5:45 (Nepal Time)

Chidika is a small town in Arghakhanchi District in the Lumbini Zone of southern Nepal. At the time of the 1991 Nepal census, the town had a population of 3578 living in 697 houses. At the time of the 2001 Nepal census, the population was 3886, of which 50% was literate.
