= Dhatiwang =

Dhatiwang धातिवाङ
- Village development committee
- Location in Lumbini Province Dhatiwang (Nepal)
- Coordinates: 27.89°N 83.21°E
- Country: Nepal
- Zone: Lumbini Zone
- District: Arghakhanchi District

Population (2001)
  - Total: 2,227
  - Religions: Hindu
- Time zone: UTC+5:45 (Nepal Time)

Dhatiwang is a village in Arghakhanchi District in the Lumbini Zone of southern Nepal. At the time of the 1991 Nepal census, the village had a population of 2100 living in 391 houses. At the time of the 2001 Nepal census, the population was 2227, of which 70% was literate.
