= Dhikura =

Dhikura ढिकुरा
- Village development committee
- Location in Lumbini Province Dhikura (Nepal)
- Coordinates: 27.94°N 83.10°E
- Country: Nepal
- Zone: Lumbini Zone
- District: Arghakhanchi District

Population (2001)
  - Total: 4,542
  - Religions: Hindu
- Time zone: UTC+5:45 (Nepal Time)

Dhikura is a small town in Arghakhanchi District in the Lumbini Zone of southern Nepal. At the time of the 1991 Nepal census, the town had a population of 3996 living in 728 houses. At the time of the 2001 Nepal census, the population was 4542, of which 62% was literate.
