= Arghakhanchi District =

Coordinates: 28°0′3″N 83°14′48″E

Arghākhā̃chī District अर्घाखाँची जिल्ला
- District
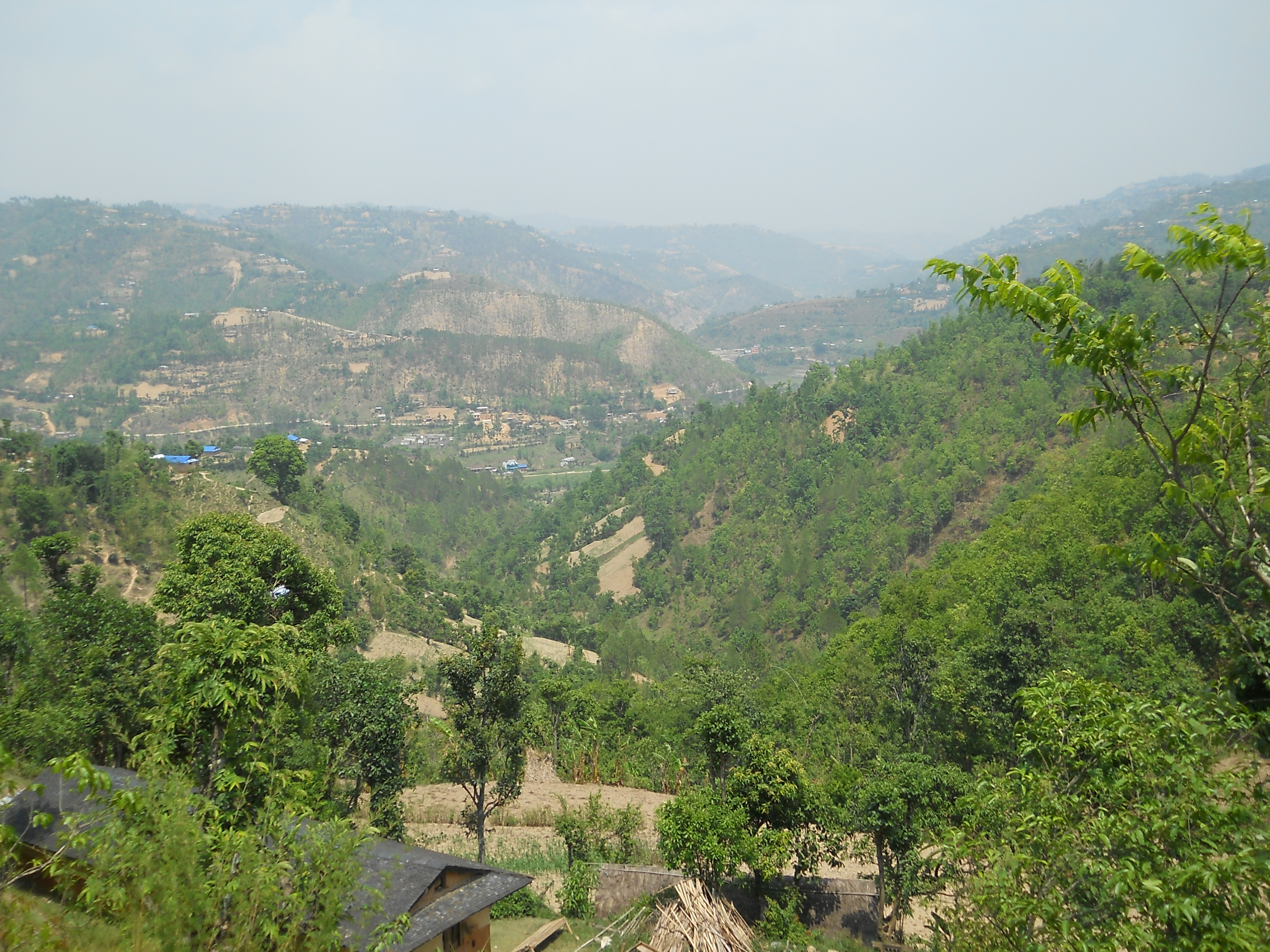
- Valley in Arghakhanchi district

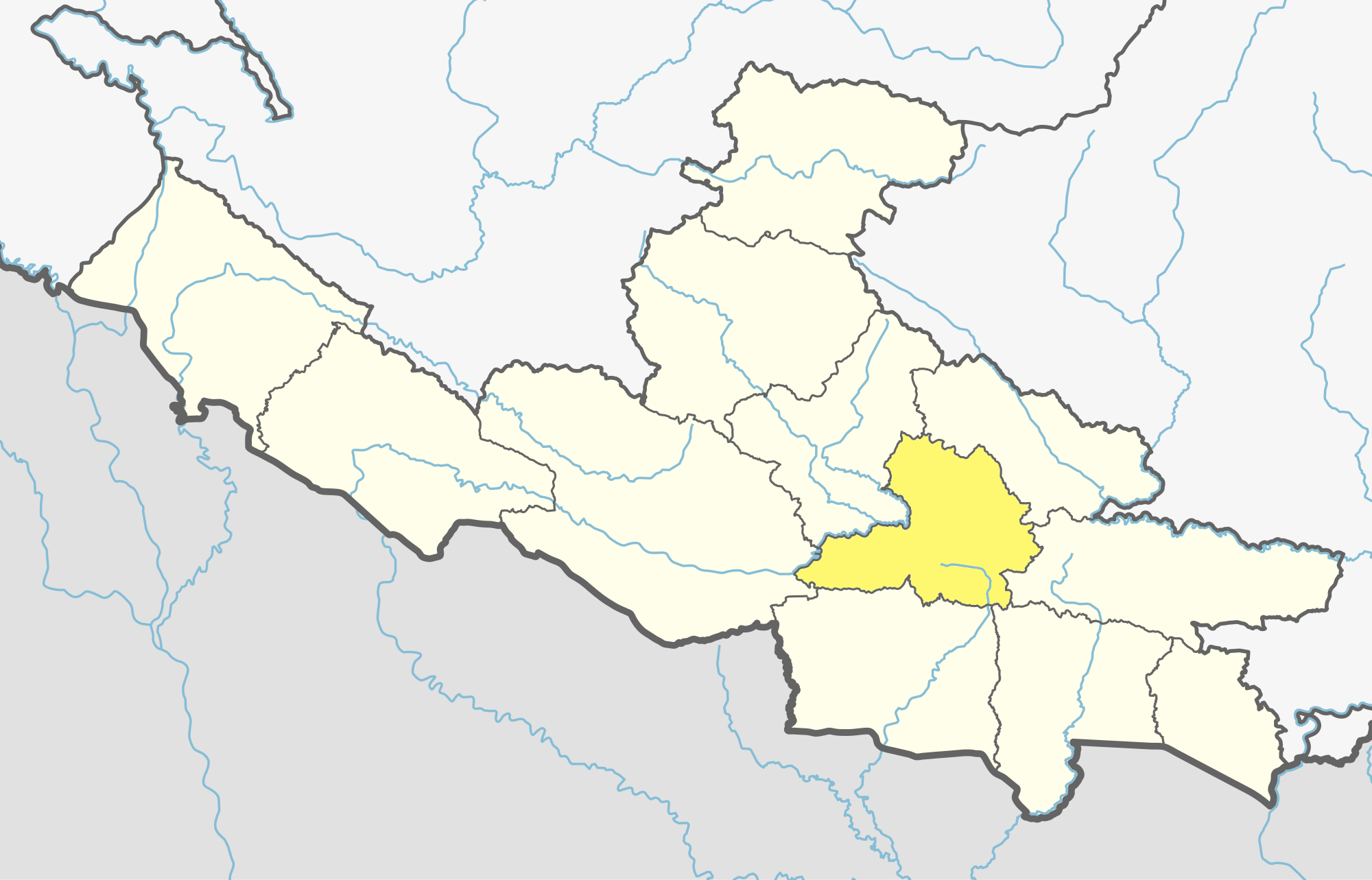
- Location of Arghakhanchi (dark yellow) in Lumbini Province
- Country: Nepal
- Province: Lumbini Province
- Admin HQ.: Sandhikharka

Government
  - Type: Coordination committee
  - Body: DCC, Arghākhānchī

Area
  - Total: 1,199 km^{2} (463 sq mi)
  - Rank: 077

Population (2011)
  - Total: 197,632
  - Density: 164.8/km^{2} (426.9/sq mi)
- Time zone: UTC+05:45 (NPT)
- Main Language(s): Nepali
- Website: daoarghakhanchi.moha.gov.np

Arghakhanchi (Nepali: अर्घाखाँची जिल्ला [ʌɾɡakʰãt͡si]) is one of the districts of Lumbini Province in Nepal. The district headquarter is Sandhikharka. The district covers an area of 1,193 km^{2} (461 sq mi) and has a population (2011) of 197,632. Its neighboring districts are Palpa in the east, Gulmi in the north, Kapilvastu District in the south and Pyuthan in the west. The district also covers 4.18 km of road connecting Kapilvastu and Bhalubang, Lalmatiya, Dang with Rapti River as Mahendra Highway or Easy-West Highway.

== History ==
The district consists of two pre-unification principalities Argha and Khanchi. Argha (Nepali:अर्घा) was the name given to ritual offerings made at the former principality's main Bhagwati Temple. Khanchi may come from the word Khajanchi (Nepali:खजाञ्चि) or tax collector since the center of the latter principality was known for its tax office. Both were two of the Chaubisi rajya (24 principalities) centred in the Gandaki Basin. In 1786 A.D. (1843 BS) during the unification of Nepal the two were annexed by Gorkha. Later the merger was renamed “Arghakhanchi” and added to Gulmi District. Arghakhanchi became a separate district in 1961 A.D. (2018 BS).

== Demographics ==
Historical population
Census year	Pop.	±% p.a.
1981	157,304	—
1991	180,884	+1.41%
2001	208,391	+1.43%
2011	197,632	−0.53%
2021	177,200	−1.09%
Source: Citypopulation

In 2001, the population was 208,391. In 1991, the population was 180,884.

At the time of the 2021 Nepal census, Arghakhanchi District had a population of 177,086. 8.18% of the population is under 5 years of age. It has a literacy rate of 80.85% and a sex ratio of 1195 females per 1000 males. 108,375 (61.20%) lived in municipalities..

Castes/ethnic groups in Arghakhanchi district (2021)
1. Bahun (28.8%)
2. Magar (19.6%)
3. Chhetri (18.1%)
4. Kami (12.2%)
5. Sarki (6.90%)
6. Kumal (4.23%)
7. Damai (3.18%)
8. Newar (2.89%)
9. Other Hill Janjati (1.65%)
10. Other Khas non-Dalit (1.04%)
11. Others (1.39%)

Khas people make up a majority of the population with 70.45% of the population. Hill Janjatis make up 25.49% of the population, of which Magars are 20% and Kumal 4%. Newars are 2.88% of the population.

Languages of Arghakhanchi district (2021)
1. Nepali (96.5%)
2. Magar (1.24%)
3. Kumal (0.95%)
4. Others (1.34%)

At the time of the 2021 census, 96.47% of the population spoke Nepali, 1.24% Magar and 0.95% Kumhali as their first language. In 2011, 97.5% of the population spoke Nepali as their first language.

Religion in Arghakhanchi District (2021)
Religion	Percent
Hinduism	98.28%
Buddhism	0.78%
Islam	0.68%
Other or not stated	0.26%

== Geography and climate ==
Arghakhanchi lies between 27'45"N and 28'6"N latitude, and 80'45"E to 83'23"E longitude. It covers 1,193 km^{2}. The altitude of the district varies from 305 to 2515 meter above the sea level. 68% of the district is in the mountainous Mahabharat Range and the rest is in the Siwalik Hills. Elevations range from 305 to 2575 m above sea level and about 40% of the total area is forested.

The major rivers of the district are Bangi Khola, Bangsari Khola, Mathurabesi Khola, Banganga Khola, Durga Khola, Sita Khola, Khakabesi Khola, Rangsing Khola, Ratne Khola, Jhimruk Khola, Khankbesi Khola and Thada Khola. Thada lake and Sengleng lake are the major lakes of the district.

Climate zone	Elevation range	% of area
Lower Tropical	below 300 meters (1,000 ft)	0.2%
Upper Tropical	300 to 1,000 meters 1,000 to 3,300 ft.	50.5%
Subtropical	1,000 to 2,000 meters 3,300 to 6,600 ft.	49.1%
Temperate	2,000 to 3,000 meters 6,400 to 9,800 ft.	0.2%

== Administration ==
The district consists of six municipalities, out of which three are urban municipalities

- Sandhikharka Municipality
- Sitganga Municipality
- Bhumikasthan Municipality
- Chhatradev Rural Municipality
- Panini Rural Municipality
- Malarani Rural Municipality

== Towns and villages ==
The major town in the district is Sandhikharka which is the headquarters of Arghakhanchi district. It is almost 300 km (190 mi) southwest of Nepal's capital of Kathmandu.

There are many small villages in the district, including Mareng, Bhagawati, Asurkot, Chhatradev Arghakhanchi, Chhatragunj Arghakhanchi Lamchi, Balkot, [[Bangi,[Dharapani, Lumbini|Dharapani]], Sandhikharka Dhikura, Dibharna, Khanchikot, Kimadada, Kura, Phudbang, Bangla, Adguri, Khana, Khanadaha, Dhad maidan, Pali, and Dhatiwang, Thada, Pharasawa Takura, Amarai, Pattharkot, and Jukena, Dhanchaur, Jaluke,Hansapur Mulakachaur,Gokunga etc
