= Madane Rural Municipality =

Madane (RM) मदाने गाउँपालिका
- Rural Municipality
- Location Madane (RM) (Nepal)
- Coordinates: 28°15′N 83°8′E
- Country: Nepal
- Province: Lumbini
- District: Gulmi
- Wards: 7
- Established: 10 March 2017

Government
  - Type: Rural Council
  - Chairperson: Mr. Mahendra Bahadur Kunwar
  - Vice-chairperson: Mrs. Sarita Khadka
  - Term of office: (2022-2027 )

Area
  - Total: 94.52 km^{2} (36.49 sq mi)

Population (2011)
  - Total: 21,899
  - Density: 231.7/km^{2} (600.1/sq mi)
- Time zone: UTC+5:45 (Nepal Standard Time)
- Headquarter: Purkot Daha
- Website: madanemun.gov.np

Madane is a Rural municipality located within the Gulmi District of the Lumbini Province of Nepal. The rural municipality spans 94.52 square kilometres (36.49 sq mi) of area, with a total population of 21,899 according to a 2011 Nepal census.

On March 10, 2017, the Government of Nepal restructured the local level bodies into 753 new local level structures. The previous Aaglung Bajhketeri, Siseni, Myal Pokhari, Malagiri, Purkot Daha and Bhanbhane VDCs were merged to form Madane Rural Municipality. Madane is divided into 7 wards, with Purkot Daha declared the administrative center of the rural municipality.
