= Gulmi Darbar Rural Municipality =

Gulmi Darbar (RM) गुल्मी दरबार गाउँपालिका
- Rural Municipality
- Location Gulmi Darbar (RM) (Nepal)
- Coordinates: 27.98°N 83.26°E
- Country: Nepal
- Province: Lumbini
- District: Gulmi
- Wards: 7
- Established: 10 March 2017

Government
  - Type: Rural Council
  - Chairperson: Mr. Ashok Kumar Thapa
  - Vice-chairperson: Mrs. Mina Bhandari
  - Term of office: (2017 - 2022)

Area
  - Total: 79.99 km^{2} (30.88 sq mi)

Population (2011)
  - Total: 22,037
  - Density: 275.5/km^{2} (713.5/sq mi)
- Time zone: UTC+5:45 (Nepal Standard Time)
- Headquarter: Gaudakot
- Website: gulmidarbarmun.gov.np

Gulmi Darbar is a Rural municipality located within the Gulmi District of the Lumbini Province of Nepal. The rural municipality spans 79.99 square kilometres (30.88 sq mi) of area, with a total population of 22,037 according to a 2011 Nepal census.

On March 10, 2017, the Government of Nepal restructured the local level bodies into 753 new local level structures. The previous Balithum, Juvung, Gaudakot, Birbas Amar Abathok and Darbar Devisthan VDCs were merged to form Gulmi Darbar Rural Municipality. Gulmi Darbar is divided into 7 wards, with Gaudakot declared the administrative center of the rural municipality.
