= Dhurkot Rural Municipality =

Dhurkot (RM) धुर्कोट गाउँपालिका
- Rural Municipality
- Location Dhurkot (RM) (Nepal)
- Coordinates: 28°6′N 83°10′E
- Country: Nepal
- Province: Lumbini
- District: Gulmi
- Wards: 7
- Established: 10 March 2017

Government
  - Type: Rural Council
  - Chairperson: Mr. Bhupal Pokhrel
  - Vice-chairperson: Mrs. Sita Giri
  - Term of office: (2022 - 2027)

Area
  - Total: 86.32 km^{2} (33.33 sq mi)

Population (2011)
  - Total: 18,814
  - Density: 218.0/km^{2} (564.5/sq mi)
- Time zone: UTC+5:45 (Nepal Standard Time)
- Headquarter: Barbot
- Website: dhurkotmun.gov.np

Dhurkot is a Rural municipality located within the Gulmi District of the Lumbini Province of Nepal. The rural municipality spans 86.32 square kilometres (33.33 sq mi) of area, with a total population of 22,454 according to a 2011 Nepal census.

On March 10, 2017, the Government of Nepal restructured the local level bodies into 753 new local level structures. The previous Nayagaun (some part excluded), Pipaldhara, Hadahade, Jaisithok, Bastu, Dhurkot Rajasthal and Wagla VDCs were merged to form Dhurkot Rural Municipality. Dhurkot is divided into 7 wards, with Barbot declared the administrative center of the rural municipality.
