= Rurukshetra Rural Municipality =

Rurukshetra (RM) रुरुक्षेत्र गाउँपालिका
- Rural Municipality
- Location Rurukshetra (RM) (Nepal)
- Coordinates: 27.99°N 83.40°E
- Country: Nepal
- Province: Lumbini
- District: Gulmi
- Wards: 6
- Established: 10 March 2017

Government
  - Type: Rural Council
  - Chairperson: Mr. Yadu Gyawali
  - Vice-chairperson: Mina Gautam
  - Term of office: (2022 - 2028)

Area
  - Total: 67.38 km^{2} (26.02 sq mi)

Population (2011)
  - Total: 18,581
  - Density: 275.8/km^{2} (714.2/sq mi)
- Time zone: UTC+5:45 (Nepal Standard Time)
- Headquarter: Baletaksar
- Website: rurumun.gov.np

Rurukshetra is a Rural municipality located within the Gulmi District of the Lumbini Province of Nepal. The rural municipality spans 67.38 square kilometres (26.02 sq mi) of area, with a total population of 18,581 according to a 2011 Nepal census.

On March 10, 2017, the Government of Nepal restructured the local level bodies into 753 new local level structures. The previous Reemuwa, Ruru, Thanpati, Gwadi, Baletaksar and Bamgha VDCs were merged to form Rurukshetra Rural Municipality. Rurukshetra is divided into 6 wards, with Baletaksar declared the administrative center of the rural municipality.

Villages include Thorga, Thanpati, Darsingbas, Chautara, Bhatkuwa, and Chyurek.
