= Chandrakot Rural Municipality =

Chandrakot (RM) चन्द्रकोट गाउँपालिका
- Rural Municipality
- Location Chandrakot (RM) (Nepal)
- Coordinates: 28.12°N 83.45°E
- Country: Nepal
- Province: Lumbini
- District: Gulmi
- Wards: 8
- Established: 10 March 2017

Government
  - Type: Rural Council
  - Chairperson: Mr. Dron Bahadur Khatri
  - Vice-chairperson: Mrs. Radhika Aryal
  - Term of office: (2017 - 2022)

Area
  - Total: 105.73 km^{2} (40.82 sq mi)

Population (2011)
  - Total: 18,662
  - Density: 176.5/km^{2} (457/sq mi)
- Time zone: UTC+5:45 (Nepal Standard Time)
- Headquarter: Shantipur
- Website: chandrakotmun.gov.np

Chandrakot is a Rural municipality located within the Gulmi District of the Lumbini Province of Nepal. The rural municipality spans 105.73 square kilometres (40.82 sq mi) of area, with a total population of 21,827 according to the 2011 Nepal census.

On March 10, 2017, the Government of Nepal restructured the local level bodies into 753 new local level structures. The previous Dirbung, Bisukharka, Harrachaur, Shantipur, Gwagha, Harewa, Rupakot and Turang VDCs were merged to form Chandrakot Rural Municipality. Chandrakot is divided into 8 wards, with Shantipur declared the administrative center of the rural municipality.
