= Gulmi (disambiguation) =

Gulmi is a district in Nepal.

Gulmi may also refer to:

== Places ==
- Gaudakot, Gulmi, a village and municipality in Gulmi District.
- Rupakot Gulmi, a village in Gulmi District.
- Musikot, Gulmi, an urban municipality in Gulmi District.
- Gulmi Tamghas, a headquarter of Gulmi District.
