= Kaligandaki Rural Municipality, Gulmi =

Kaligandaki (RM) कालीगण्डकी गाउँपालिका
- Rural Municipality
- Location Kaligandaki (RM) (Nepal)
- Coordinates: 28.05°N 83.55°E
- Country: Nepal
- Province: Lumbini
- District: Gulmi
- Wards: 7
- Established: 10 March 2017

Government
  - Type: Rural Council
  - Chairperson: Mr. Bed Bahadur Thapa
  - Vice-chairperson: Mrs. Tara Thapa
  - Term of office: (2017 - 2022)

Area
  - Total: 101.04 km^{2} (39.01 sq mi)

Population (2011)
  - Total: 18,876
  - Density: 186.82/km^{2} (483.85/sq mi)
- Time zone: UTC+5:45 (Nepal Standard Time)
- Headquarter: Purtighat
- Website: kaligandakimungulmi.gov.np

Kaligandaki is a Rural municipality located in the eastern part of the Gulmi District of the Lumbini Province of Nepal. The rural municipality spans 101.04 square kilometres (39.01 sq mi) of area, with a total population of 18,876 according to the 2011 Nepal census.

On March 10, 2017, the Government of Nepal restructured the local level bodies into 753 new local level structures. The previous Harmichaur, Phoksing, Arbani, Jayakhani, Purtighat, Khadgakot and Bhurtung VDCs were merged to form Kaligandaki Rural Municipality. Kaligandaki is divided into 7 wards, with Purtighat declared the administrative center of the rural municipality.
