= Chhatrakot Rural Municipality =

Chhatrakot (RM) छत्रकोट गाउँपालिका
- Rural Municipality
- Location Chhatrakot (RM) (Nepal)
- Coordinates: 28°3′N 83°21′E
- Country: Nepal
- Province: Lumbini
- District: Gulmi
- Wards: 6
- Established: 10 March 2017

Government
  - Type: Rural Council
  - Chairperson: Mr. Ramprasad Pandeya
  - Vice-chairperson: Mrs. Sabitra Gyawali
  - Term of office: (2022-2027)

Area
  - Total: 87.01 km^{2} (33.59 sq mi)

Population (2021)
  - Total: 19,357
  - Density: 222.5/km^{2} (576.2/sq mi)
- Time zone: UTC+5:45 (Nepal Standard Time)
- Headquarter: Hardineta
- Website: chhatrakotmun.gov.np

Chhatrakot is a Rural municipality located within the Gulmi District of the Lumbini Province of Nepal. The rural municipality spans 87.02 square kilometres (33.60 sq mi) of area, with a total population of 19,357 according to a 2021 Nepal census.

On March 10, 2017, the Government of Nepal restructured the local level bodies into 753 new local level structures. The previous Hunga, Palkikot, Hadinete, Digam, Kharjyang and Daungha VDCs were merged to form Chhatrakot Rural Municipality. Chhatrakot is divided into 6 wards, with Hardineta declared the administrative center of the rural municipality.
