= Kaligandaki Corridor =

Highway in Nepal

Kaligandaki Corridor कालीगण्डकी करिडोर
- राष्ट्रिय राजमार्ग ४८
- National Highway 48
- NH48 in red line
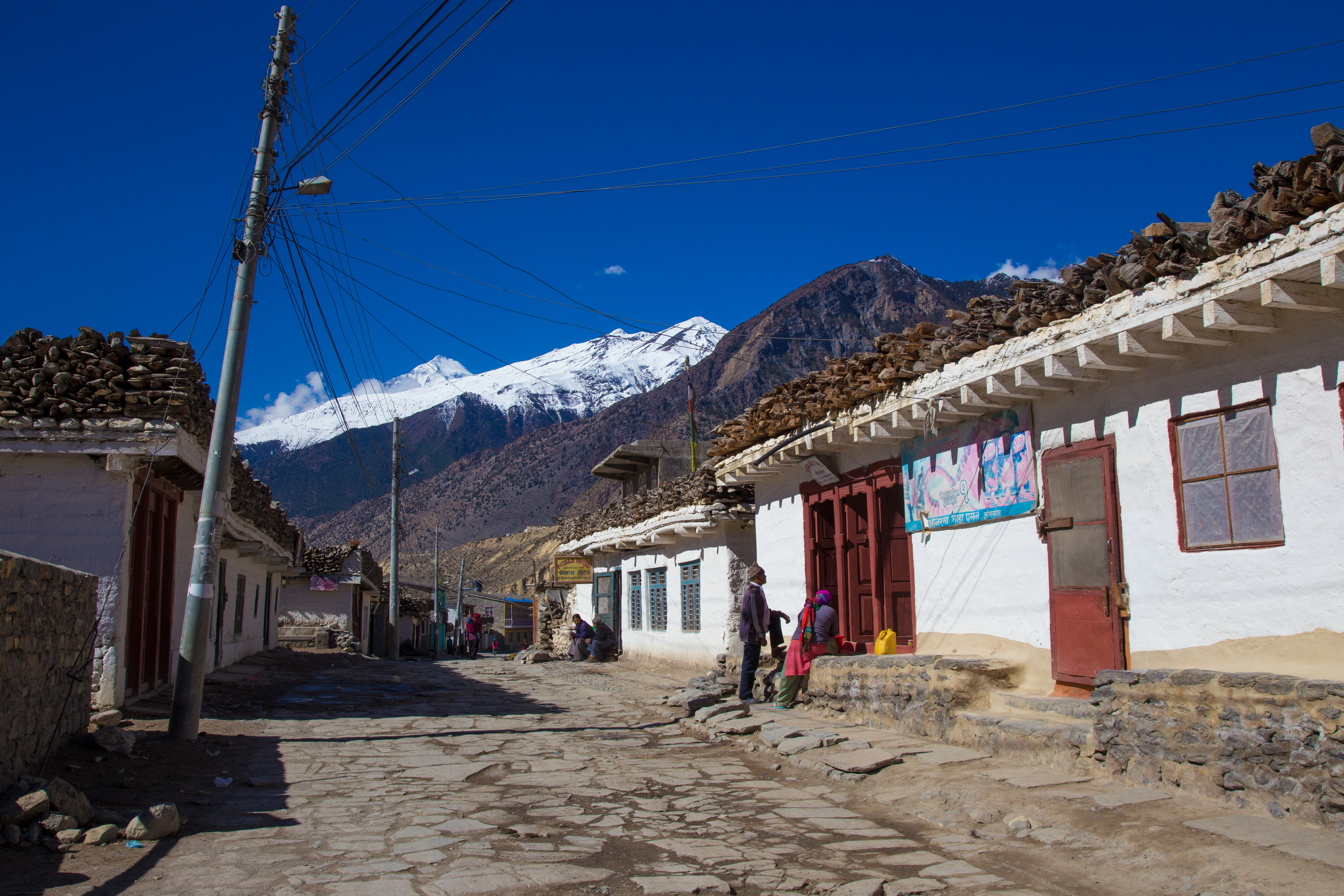
- NH48 at Jomsom in 2014

Route information
- Maintained by MoPIT (Department of Roads)
- Length: 254 km (158 mi)
- Existed: under construction–present
- History: Under Construction

Major junctions
- North end: Korala
- Kagbeni, Beni, Kushma, Kaligandaki, Satyawati, Ridi Bazar
- South end: Tansen

Location
- Country: Nepal
- Provinces: Lumbini, Gandaki
- Districts: Palpa, Gulmi, Baglung, Parbat, Myagdi, Mustang

Highway system
- Roads in Nepal
← NH47	→ NH49

NH48 or Kaligandaki Corridor (Nepali: काली गन्डकी राजमार्ग) is an under construction 254 kilometres (158 mi) long highway in Nepal starting from Gaindakot, Nawalpur and ending at Korala, the northern part near the Chinese border. It is one of the National Pride Projects. After the completion, about 1 million people of 10 districts will have direct access to motorable road. The road is also predicted to become a trading route between Nepal, India and China.

The route passes through Midhills and Himalayan mountains. Main locality includes Palpa, Syangja, Parbat, Baglung and Muktinath.

The road is being constructed by multiple contractors, including Nepal Army’s Road Construction Division. The project was started on 3 December 2018 and scheduled for completion by December 2021, despite this the project is still unfinished as of November 2026

The highway NH48 ends and meets NH47 at Tansen and the NH47 further goes to Indo-Nepal border to Belahiya near Siddharthanagar.

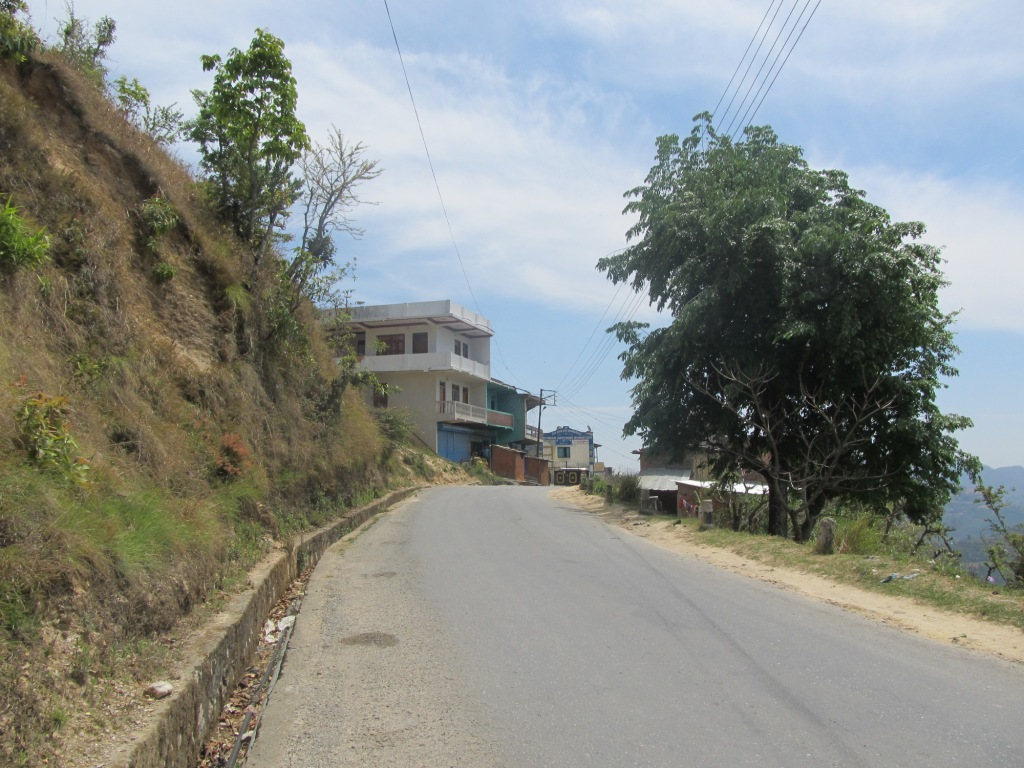
Vairabshtan road, Palpa a part of NH48 Kaligandaki Corridor

== See also ==
- Roads in Nepal
- National Pride Projects
