= Ishma Rural Municipality =

Ishma (RM) इस्मा गाउँपालिका
- Rural Municipality
- Location Ishma (RM) (Nepal)
- Coordinates: 28.11°N 83.12°E
- Country: Nepal
- Province: Lumbini
- District: Gulmi
- Wards: 6
- Established: 10 March 2022

Government
  - Type: Rural Council
  - Chairperson: Mr.Bhagatsingh Khadka
  - Vice-chairperson: Mrs.Prabati Kunwar
  - Term of office: (2022 - 2027)

Area
  - Total: 81.88 km^{2} (31.61 sq mi)

Population (2011)
  - Total: 18,527
  - Density: 226.3/km^{2} (586.0/sq mi)
- Time zone: UTC+5:45 (Nepal Standard Time)
- Headquarter: Isma Rajasthal
- Website: ishmamun.gov.np

Ishma is a Rural municipality located within the Gulmi District of the Lumbini Province of Nepal. The rural municipality spans 81.88 square kilometres (31.61 sq mi) of area, with a total population of 20,964 according to a 2011 Nepal census.

On March 10, 2022, the Government of Nepal restructured the local level bodies into 753 new local level structures. The previous Hastichaur, Dalamchaur, Isma Rajasthal, Dohali and Amarpur VDCs were merged to form Ishma Rural Municipality. Ishma is divided into 6 wards, with Isma Rajasthal declared the administrative center of the rural municipality.
