= National Highway 49 (Nepal) =

Highway in Nepal

Badigad Corridor वडिगाड करिडोर
- राष्ट्रिय राजमार्ग ४९
- National Highway 49
- NH49 in red

Route information
- Maintained by MoPIT (Department of Roads)
- Length: 48.40 km (30.07 mi)

Major junctions
- North end: Wamitaksar
- Sourh end: Rudrabeni

Location
- Country: Nepal
- Provinces: Lumbini Province
- Districts: Gulmi District

Highway system
- Roads in Nepal
← NH48	→ NH50

National Highway NH49 (Wamitaksar–Rudrabeni, Shantipur road, Badigad Corridor) is a national highway in Nepal. The highway is located in Gulmi District in Lumbini Province. The total length of the highway is 48.40 kilometres (30.07 mi).

It was a Feeder Road F132 which upgraded to NH49. Wamitaksar-Rudrabeni road section runs along the left bank of Badigad River.
