= Satyawati Rural Municipality =

Satyawati (RM) सत्यवती गाउँपालिका
- Rural Municipality
- Location Satyawati (RM) (Nepal)
- Coordinates: 28.04°N 83.43°E
- Country: Nepal
- Province: Lumbini
- District: Gulmi
- Wards: 8
- Established: 10 March 2017

Government
  - Type: Rural Council
  - Chairperson: Mr. Tikaram Pandey
  - Vice-chairperson: Mrs. Nirmaya Taramu
  - Term of office: (2022-2027)

Area
  - Total: 115.92 km^{2} (44.76 sq mi)

Population (2011)
  - Total: 23,807
  - Density: 205.37/km^{2} (531.92/sq mi)
- Time zone: UTC+5:45 (Nepal Standard Time)
- Headquarter: Johang
- Website: satyawatimun.gov.np

Satyawati is a Rural municipality located within the Gulmi District of the Lumbini Province of Nepal. The rural municipality spans 115.92 square kilometres (44.76 sq mi) of area, with a total population of 23,807 according to a 2011 Nepal census.

On March 10, 2017, the Government of Nepal restructured the local level bodies into 753 new local level structures. The previous Aslewa, Thulo lumpek, Limgha, Hansara, Johang, Juniya and Bharse VDCs were merged to form Satyawati Rural Municipality. Satyawati is divided into 8 wards, with Johang declared the administrative center of the rural municipality.
