= Resunga Airport =

Airport in Gulmi, Nepal

Gulmi Resunga Airport रेसुङ्गा विमानस्थल
- IATA: none; ICAO: VNRG

Summary
- Airport type: Public
- Owner: Government Of Nepal
- Operator: Civil Aviation Authority of Nepal (CAAN)
- Elevation AMSL: 5,015 ft / 1,529.267 m
- Coordinates: 28°01′17.58″N 083°15′20.4″E

Map
- Location within Nepal

Runways
Direction	Length		Surface
Direction	ft	m	Surface
15/33		520	Earthen

Gulmi Resunga Airport is a domestic airport in Resunga in Gulmi District in Lumbini Province in Nepal.

== History ==
Construction of the Airport first started in 2006. The foundation stone was laid by then tourism minister Pradeep Kumar Gyawali.

In June 2018, the first test flight was conducted by Tara Air despite the airport not having blacktopped the runway.

In January 2023, a certification flight was conducted by Tara Air.

In May 2023, Nepal Airlines launched regular flights from the airport.

== Location and Access ==
Airport is lies in Simichaur in the District Headquarters of Resunga The airport is spread over 78 Ropanis (39,681 sq m) of land.

== Facilities ==
The airport resides at an elevation of 5,015 ft (1,529 m) above mean sea level. It has one runway which is 560m in length and 20m in width.

== Airlines and destinations ==
Airlines	Destinations
Nepal Airlines	Kathmandu

== See also ==
- List of airports in Nepal

== Further ==
- Udayapur revives airport plan
- Constructing Sagarmatha Airport (in Nepali)
