= Musikot, Gulmi =

Musikot मुसिकोट
- Municipality नगरपालिका
- Location in Nepal Musikot (Nepal)
- Coordinates: 28.18°N 83.35°E
- Country: Nepal
- Province: Lumbini Province
- District: Gulmi
- Established: 14 May 2022

Government
  - Type: Mayor-council
  - Mayor: Mr. Jivan Kharel
  - Deputy mayor: Mrs. Ganga Shrestha

Area
  - Total: 114.74 km^{2} (44.30 sq mi)

Population (2021)
  - Total: 28,454
  - Density: 247.99/km^{2} (642.28/sq mi)
- Time zone: UTC+5:45 (NST)
- Website: official website

Musikot (Nepali: मुसिकोट) is an urban municipality located in Gulmi District of Lumbini Province of Nepal.

The total area of the municipality is 114.74 square kilometres (44.30 mi^{2}) and the total population of the municipality as of 2011 Nepal census is 32,802 individuals. The municipality is divided into total 9 wards.

On 10 March 2017 Government of Nepal announced 744 local level units as per the new constitution of Nepal 2015, Musikot municipality came into existence merging following former VDCs: Arlangkot, Paudi Amarahi, Musikot, Badagaun, Aanpchaur, Kurgha, Wami Taksar and some parts of Neta. The headquarters of the municipality are located at Wami Taksar.

== Demographics ==
According to the 2021 Nepal census, the linguistic composition of Musikot Municipality was as follows: 97.2% of the population spoke Nepali as their first language, 1.1% spoke Nepalbhasha (Newari), 1.0% spoke Gurung, 0.3% spoke Bhojpuri, 0.2% spoke Magar Dhut, 0.1% spoke Tharu, 0.05% spoke Tamang, and 0.2% spoke other languages.

Ethnically and by caste, the population of Musikot Municipality was distributed as follows: 22.1% were Kshetri, 18.9% were Hill Brahmin, 14.5% were Bishwokarma, 14.4% were Magar, 10.2% were Kumal, 6.3% were Mijar, 4.6% were Pariyar, 2.2% were Thakuri, 1.7% were Newar, and 1.5% were Gurung.

Religiously, the population was predominantly Hindu at 98.1%, followed by 1.0% Buddhist, 0.3% Christian, 0.3% Prakriti, 0.3% Bon, and 0.03% Muslim.

== Climate ==
Climate data for Musikot, elevation 1,280 m (4,200 ft)
Month	Jan	Feb	Mar	Apr	May	Jun	Jul	Aug	Sep	Oct	Nov	Dec	Year
Mean daily maximum °C (°F)	16.4 (61.5)	18.7 (65.7)	23.4 (74.1)	27.9 (82.2)	29.0 (84.2)	28.1 (82.6)	26.7 (80.1)	26.6 (79.9)	26.1 (79.0)	24.4 (75.9)	21.0 (69.8)	17.5 (63.5)	23.8 (74.9)
Mean daily minimum °C (°F)	4.0 (39.2)	5.5 (41.9)	9.4 (48.9)	14.3 (57.7)	16.9 (62.4)	18.7 (65.7)	19.2 (66.6)	19.0 (66.2)	17.7 (63.9)	14.5 (58.1)	8.3 (46.9)	4.5 (40.1)	12.7 (54.8)
Average precipitation mm (inches)	21.3 (0.84)	22.4 (0.88)	33.2 (1.31)	63.0 (2.48)	167.3 (6.59)	410.5 (16.16)	511.1 (20.12)	465.1 (18.31)	262.5 (10.33)	61.9 (2.44)	6.0 (0.24)	16.8 (0.66)	2,041.1 (80.36)
Source 1: Australian National University
Source 2: Japan International Cooperation Agency (precipitation)
