= Gaidakot =

Gaidakot may refer to:

- Gaudakot, Gulmi, Nepal
- Gaidakot, Nawalparasi, Nepal
