= Aapchaur =

Aapchaur आँपचौर
- Village Development Committee
- Location in Nepal
- Coordinates: 28°8′51″N 83°19′46″E
- Country: Nepal
- Zone: Lumbini Zone
- District: Gulmi District
- Time zone: UTC+5:45 (Nepal Time)
- Area code: +977-079
- Website: ddcgulmi.gov.np

Aapchaur is a hill village in Gulmi District, central Nepal, roughly 10 kilometres northeast of Tamghas and 30 kilometres southwest of Baglung. Overlooking a river valley, this village area was the cradle of the Nepalese coffee industry when it was first planted by a Hindu holy man using seeds from Burma in 1937.
