= Kurgha =

Kurgha may refer to:

- Kurgha, Dhawalagiri, Nepal
- Kurgha, Lumbini, Nepal
