= Dubichaur =

Dubichour
- Location in Nepal
- Coordinates: 28.05°N 83.27°E
- Country: Nepal

Population (1991)
  - Total: 2,532
- Time zone: UTC+5:45 (Nepal Time)

Dubichour is located in Resunga Municipality inside Gulmi District in the Lumbini Zone of central Nepal. At the time of the 1991 Nepal census it had a population of 2532 persons living in 478 individual households.
