= Palkikot =

Palkikot पल्लिकोट Pallikot
- Village and former VDC
- Location in Nepal
- Coordinates: 28°3′N 83°21′E
- Country: Nepal
- Province: Lumbini Province
- District: Gulmi District
- Rural municipality: Chhatrakot (ward 2)

Population (2021)
  - Total: 2,637
- Time zone: UTC+5:45 (Nepal Time)

Palkikot (Nepali: पल्लिकोट, also Pallikot) is a village and former village development committee in Gulmi District in Lumbini Province of Nepal. In 2017 it was merged with five other VDCs to form Chhatrakot Rural Municipality. The village is now ward 2 in the municipality. At the time of the 1991 Nepal census it had a population of 2,085 persons living in 387 individual households. In the 2021 Nepal census, the ward had a population of 2,637.
