= Badagaun =

Badagaun may refer to:

- Badagaun, Lumbini, Nepal
- Badagaun, Rapti, Nepal
