= Apchaur =

Apchaur आँपचौर
- Village Development Committee
- Location in Nepal
- Coordinates: 28.13°N 83.34°E
- Country: Nepal
- Zone: Lumbini Zone
- District: Gulmi District

Population (1991)
  - Total: 3,910
- Time zone: UTC+5:45 (Nepal Time)

Apchaur is a popular VDC in Gulmi District in the Lumbini Zone of central Nepal. At the time of the 1991 Nepal census it had a population of 3910 persons living in 743 individual households.
