= Arlangkot =

Arlangkot अर्लाङकोट
- Town
- Location in Nepal Arlangkot (Nepal)
- Coordinates: 28.18°N 83.35°E
- Country: Nepal
- Municipality: Musikot Municipality
- District: Gulmi District

Population (1991)
  - Total: 2,498
- Time zone: UTC+5:45 (Nepal Time)
- Area code: 079

Arlangkot (Nepali: अर्लाङकोट) is a town in Gulmi District part of the Musikot Municipality. At the time of the 1991 Nepal census it had a population of 2498 persons living in 424 individual households.
