= Thorga =

- VDC
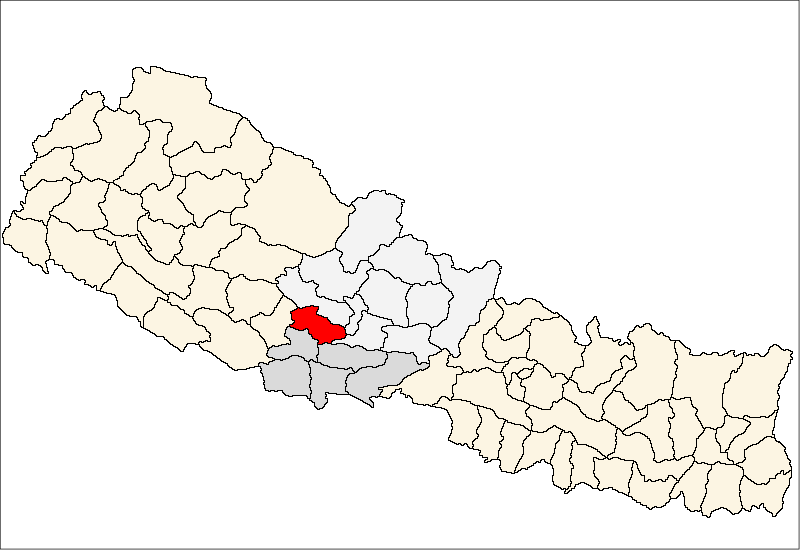
- Thorga village location in map of Nepal.
- Nickname: Origin of Thorga "Greeny VDC"
- Motto: Make Big Plans (Make No Small Plans)
- Country: Nepal
- Region: Western
- Zone: Lumbini
- District: Gulmi
- Settled: 2034 VS

Government
  - Type: Democratic

Population
  - Total: 1,150
- Time zone: NP
- Website: ddcgulmi.gov.np

Thorga is a village in Gulmi district, Lumbini Zone, Nepal. It is mostly inhabited by Brahmins. The population of this village is around 1200 and literacy rate is about 35%.

== Gulmi District ==
Gulmi District (Nepali: गुल्मी जिल्ला), a part of Lumbini Zone, is one of the seventy-five districts of Nepal. The district, with Tamghas as its headquarters, covers an area of 1,149 km^{2}, had a population of 296,654 in 2001 and 280,160 in 2011.

== Main features ==
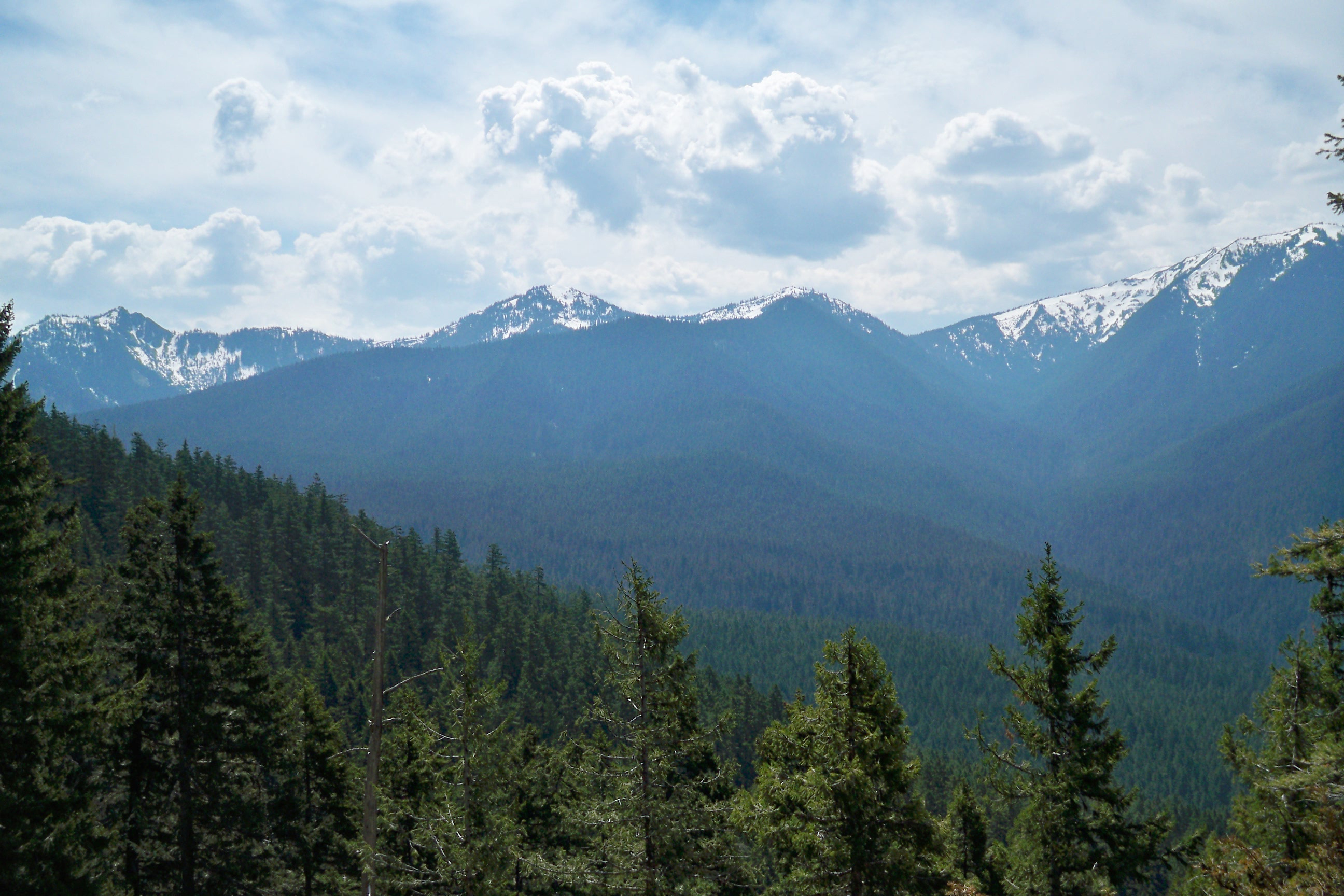
A view from Thorga

It is renowned for coffee farming. People here depend upon agriculture and teaching occupation. In Agriculture, coffee & sugarcane are the main products.

== Education institutes ==
- Shree Prativa Primary school
- Rainbow Boarding School
- Shree Rastriya Higher secondary school

== See also ==
- Lumbini zone
