= Murtung =

Marbhung मर्भुंग
- Village Development Committee
- Interactive map of Marbhung
- Country: Nepal
- Zone: Lumbini Zone
- District: Gulmi District

Population (1991)
  - Total: 3,363
- Time zone: UTC+5:45 (Nepal Time)

Marbhung is a town and municipality in Gulmi District in the Lumbini Zone of central Nepal. At the time of the 1991 Nepal census it had a population of 3363 persons living in 631 individual households.
