= Thulo Lumpek =

Coordinates: 27°59′N 83°31′E

Thulo Lumpek ठूलो लुम्पेक
- Village Development Committee
- Interactive map of Thulo Lumpek
- Country: Nepal
- Zone: Lumbini Zone
- District: Gulmi District

Population (1991)
  - Total: 6,175
- Time zone: UTC+5:45 (Nepal Time)

Thulo Lumpek is a town and municipality in Gulmi District in the Lumbini Zone of central Nepal. At the time of the 1991 Nepal census it had a population of 6175 persons living in 1020 individual households.
