= Dhurkot Nayagaun =

Dhurkot Nayagaun धुर्कोट नयाँगाउँ
- Village Development Committee
- Location in Nepal
- Coordinates: 28.09°N 83.19°E
- Country: Nepal
- Zone: Lumbini Zone
- District: Gulmi District

Population (1991)
  - Total: 4,692
- Time zone: UTC+5:45 (Nepal Time)

Dhurkot Nayagaun is a town and municipality in Gulmi District in the Lumbini Zone of central Nepal. At the time of the 1991 Nepal census it had a population of 4692. This VDC is one of the most beautiful VDC of Gulmi and famous for Oranges. Literacy rate of this VDC is above 90%. Politically above 75% people support Nepali Congress in this village. This VDC is touched by Arghakhanchi district.
