= Bhurtung =

Coordinates: 28°7′N 83°31′E

Bhurtung भुर्तुङ Chhapchour
- Village Development Committee
- Interactive map of Bhurtung
- Country: Nepal
- Zone: Lumbini Zone
- District: Gulmi District

Population (1991)
  - Total: 4,047
- Time zone: UTC+5:45 (Nepal Time)
- A.P.O: 32602 (A.P.O.)

Bhurtung is a rural village and a Ward in Kaligandaki Rural Municipality located in Gulmi District of the Lumbini Province situated in Central Nepal. At the time of the 1991 Nepal census it had a population of 4047 persons living in 784 individual households.
