= Tamghas =

Tamghās तम्घास
- Town
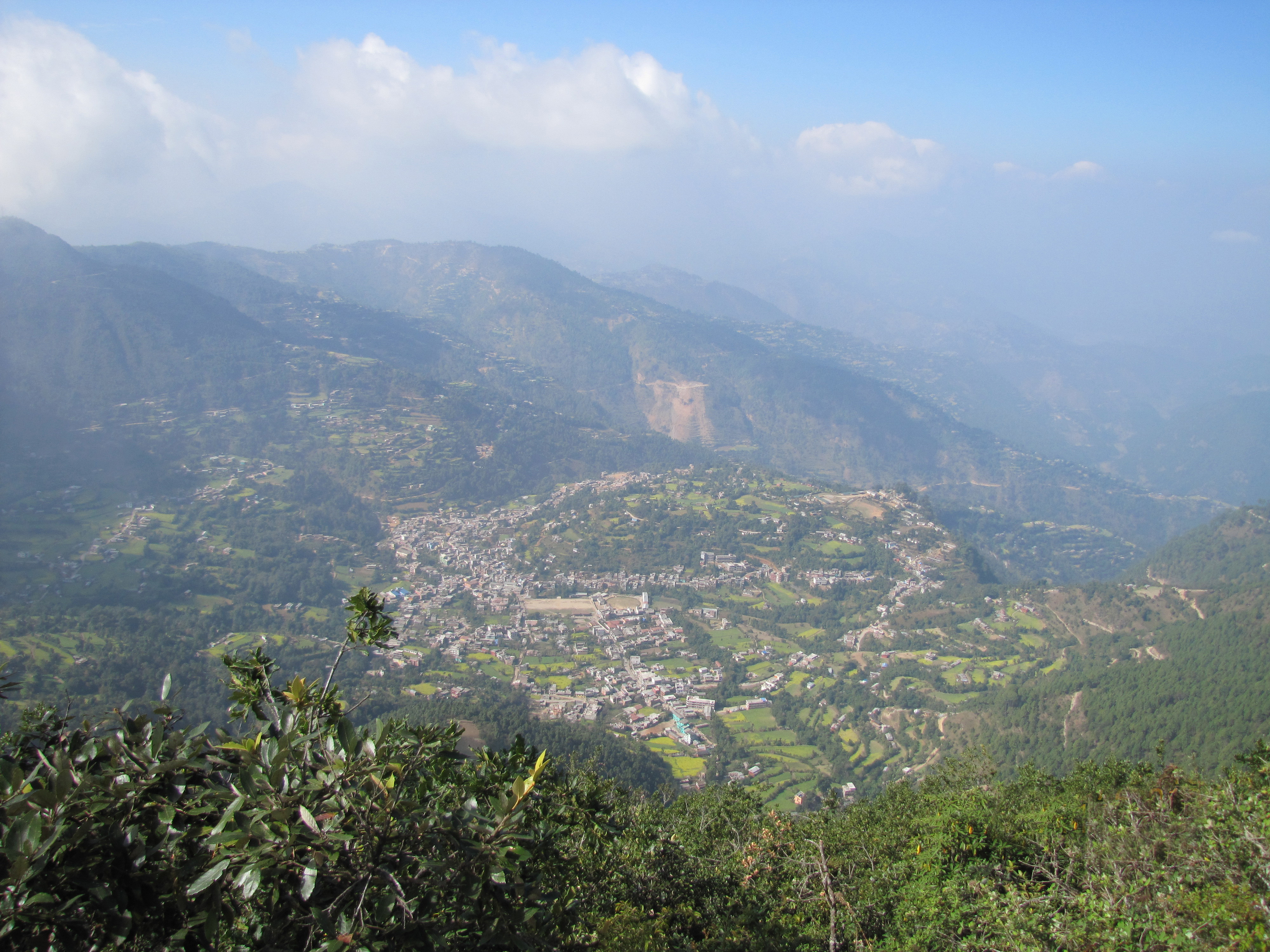
- Tamghas

- Location in Nepal
- Coordinates: 28°4′N 83°15′E
- Country: Nepal
- Admin. division: Lumbini Zone
- District: Gulmi District

Population (2021)
  - Total: 31,551
- Climate: Cwb

Tamghas, also Gulmi Tamghas or Tamghas Bazaar (Nepali: तम्घास) is a town and the centre of Resunga Municipality, and the district headquarters of Gulmi District, in the Lumbini Zone of Nepal.

== Demographics ==
According to the 2021 Nepal census (2078 B.S.), Resunga Municipality (which encompasses Tamghas) had a total population of 31,551 residing in 9,015 households, with a population density of 377 inhabitants per square kilometer. Females accounted for 53.9% of the population and males accounted for 46.1%, resulting in a sex ratio of 85.58 males per 100 females.

== Economy ==
=== Trade, services, and financial sector ===
As the administrative headquarters of Gulmi District, Tamghas functions as the primary commercial, retail, and service center for the surrounding rural municipalities. The local economy is heavily service-oriented, driven by public administration, education, healthcare, hospitality, and wholesale-retail trade supplying consumer goods across the district.

The town serves as the financial hub of the district, hosting branch offices of major Nepalese commercial banks (such as Nepal Bank, Agriculture Development Bank, Nabil Bank, NIC Asia Bank, and Laxmi Sunrise Bank), development banks, microfinance institutions, and savings and credit cooperatives. Foreign remittances sent by migrant workers employed in the Persian Gulf, Malaysia, India, and other destinations form a major pillar of household income in Tamghas and the broader municipality, fueling local retail consumption, real estate, and banking deposits.

=== Agriculture and natural resources ===
While the urban core of Tamghas is focused on commerce and services, surrounding settlements within Resunga Municipality rely on hill agriculture and horticulture. Key commercial cash crops produced in the municipality and traded through Tamghas include mandarin oranges (citrus) and specialty Arabica coffee, for which Gulmi District is nationally recognized. Local agro-processing and cottage enterprises include dairy processing (such as Gulmi Dairy), coffee pulping and packaging, and small-scale food production.

Geologically, the Tamghas area is also noted in historical surveys for the presence of cobalt mineral deposits.

== Geography ==
=== Topography and setting ===
Tamghas is situated in a bowl-shaped valley in the Lesser Himalaya (Mahabharat Range) of western Nepal, at an elevation of approximately 1,450 to 1,650 m (4,760 to 5,410 ft) above sea level. The urban settlement lies primarily within Wards 1, 2, 7, 8, and 9 of Resunga Municipality, bordering the former village development committee area of Gulmi Arkhale to the west.

The town is framed by prominent forested ridges on opposite sides:

- Resunga Hill: Rising directly to the northeast of the bazaar to an elevation of over 2,300 m (7,500 ft), this dense subtropical and temperate woodland—dominated by Rhododendron (laligurans), oak, and pine forests—serves as the primary watershed and ecological landmark of the town.
- Arjun Hill (Arjun Kot): Rising to the west of the valley, this ridge forms the western skyline of Tamghas and houses historic fortifications and viewpoints overlooking the settlement.

From the upper ridges surrounding Tamghas, particularly from the Resunga viewpoint, clear weather affords panoramic views across the middle hills toward the high Himalayan massifs of Dhaulagiri, Annapurna, and Manaslu.

=== Drainage and climate ===
The valley is drained by small mountain streams and rivulets—most notably the Chhaldi and Panaha tributaries—which descend from the surrounding hills into the Badigad River and Kali Gandaki River basins.

Owing to its mid-hill elevation, Tamghas experiences a humid subtropical climate (Köppen climate classification: Cwa) moderated by altitude, featuring four distinct seasons:

- Spring and Autumn: Mild, clear, and temperate, with daytime temperatures typically ranging between 18 and 26 °C (64 and 79 °F).
- Summer / Monsoon: Warm and humid, with heavy monsoon rainfall concentrated between June and September.
- Winter: Cool and crisp, with occasional morning valley fog and nighttime temperatures dropping near 4 to 8 °C (39 to 46 °F).

== Culture and tourism ==
=== Religious and historical landmarks ===
Tamghas and its surrounding ridges serve as a major religious and cultural hub in Gulmi District, anchored by several historic Hindu shrines and heritage sites:

- Resunga Area (Resunga Kshetra): Located on the forested hilltop above Tamghas, this sacred complex—traditionally associated with the Vedic sage Rishyasringa—features the Yagyashala, Siddha Baba Temple, and sacred ponds (Pokhari). It attracts thousands of pilgrims annually, particularly during Harishayani Ekadashi, Haribodhini Ekadashi, and the month of Shrawan.
- Tamghas Bhagawati Temple: Situated within the town center, this historic shrine is dedicated to the goddess Bhagawati and serves as the focal point for major municipal rituals and Dashain celebrations.
- Arjun Bhagawati and Arjun Kot: Located on Arjun Hill overlooking the western side of Tamghas, this historic fort (kot) and temple complex dates back to the era of the Chaubisi Rajya principalities and holds both religious and historical significance.

=== Tourism and sightseeing ===
Tamghas serves as the primary base for visitors exploring the religious, historical, and natural attractions of Gulmi District. The surrounding ridges—particularly the Resunga viewpoint and Arjun Hill—are noted for panoramic sightseeing across the middle hills and high mountain ranges.

On clear days, particularly during autumn and spring, viewpoints above Tamghas offer unobstructed vistas of the Dhaulagiri, Annapurna, and Manaslu Himalayan massifs to the north and northeast, alongside expansive views of the high hill and trans-Himalayan landscapes stretching northwest toward Dhorpatan and the Dolpa (Dunai) region.

In addition to mountain viewing, local tourism activities include short trekking routes through the Resunga Community Forest—known for seasonal Rhododendron blooms and birdwatching—visits to historic kot forts, and agro-tourism centered on local citrus orchards and specialty coffee farms.

=== Festivals and traditions ===
The cultural life of Tamghas reflects a blend of Khas-Arya (Brahmin, Chhetri, and Dalit), Newar, and Magar traditions. Major national Hindu festivals—including Dashain, Tihar, Teej, and Maghe Sankranti—are celebrated across the town with community gatherings and temple processions.

A signature local tradition is the Saraye Nach (sword dance), performed during Dashain (especially on Kojagrat Purnima) at historical kot shrines in and around Tamghas, where participants dance with traditional weapons (khukuri and swords) to the accompaniment of the Panche baja ensemble.

The town's historic Newar community—settled in the older bazaar quarters—also preserves traditional festivals such as Gai Jatra, Ropain Jatra, and Lakhey dances, adding distinct street performances to the town's annual calendar.

=== Language and cuisine ===
Nepali is the primary language of administration, education, and daily commerce, while Magar and Nepal Bhasa are spoken within their respective households. Local cuisine features staple mid-hill Nepali dishes alongside regional specialties such as sel roti, batuk, chukauri, and locally grown organic mandarin oranges and Gulmi coffee.

== Education ==
According to the 2021 Nepal census (2078 B.S.), Resunga Municipality (which encompasses Tamghas) had an overall literacy rate of 85.4% (for the population aged five and above), with male literacy at 91.8% and female literacy at 80.0%.

As the administrative headquarters of Gulmi District, Tamghas serves as the district's primary educational hub. Major public and private schools in the town include:

- Adarsha Bidhya Ashram
- Arjun Boarding High School
- Brilliant United Academy
- Buddha Lower Secondary School
- Gandaki Boarding School
- Mahendra Secondary School
- Reader's Public High School
- Resunga Secondary School
- Siddhababa Secondary School
- Srijana Primary School

For higher education, Resunga Multiple Campus—established in 1982 (2039 B.S.) and affiliated with Tribhuvan University—offers undergraduate and postgraduate programs in management, education, and the humanities. Additionally, several local secondary schools and vocational centers in Tamghas offer specialized technical and vocational education programs (such as engineering and agriculture streams under the CTEVT and NEB curricula).

== Administration ==
As the administrative headquarters of Gulmi District, Tamghas houses the primary federal, provincial, and local government offices, alongside the municipal executive office of Resunga Municipality. Key civil and sectoral offices located in the town include:

- District Administration Office (DAO)
- District Court and District Government Attorney Office
- District Coordination Committee (DCC)
- District Election Office
- Education Development and Coordination Unit
- Land Administration Office (*Malpot*) and Survey Office
- Treasury and Comptroller Office
- Water Resources and Irrigation Development Division Office
- Division Forest Office and Infrastructure Development Office

Security and law enforcement agencies based in Tamghas include the District Police Office, District Traffic Police Office, an Armed Police Force unit, and a Nepali Army barracks (Ramban Gulm). Public services are further supported by the government-run Gulmi Hospital (formerly Tamghas Hospital), which acts as the district's primary referral healthcare facility, and the District Prison.

== Transportation ==
=== Road network and transit hubs ===
Tamghas serves as the primary transport hub for Gulmi District, linked to the national highway network via the Ridi–Tamghas section of the Madan Bhandari Highway (NH09) and the Tansen–Ridi–Tamghas road, which connects the town eastward to Palpa, Butwal, and the Siddhartha Highway.

Public road transport operates from three major direction-specific terminals within the town:

- Budhathoki Bus Park (Main Bus Park): Located along the Tansen–Ridi–Tamghas corridor, it serves as the primary terminal for long-distance buses and microbuses traveling east toward Ridi, Tansen, Butwal, and Kathmandu.
- Arghakhanchi Jeep Park: Situated on the southern side of town, this terminal handles shared jeeps and local transport bound for neighboring Arghakhanchi District as well as rural municipalities in southern and western Gulmi.
- Udhindhunga Jeep Park: Located in the northern part of the bazaar, it serves rural feeder routes connecting Tamghas to northern and western settlements in Gulmi—such as Isma, Dhurkot, and Musikot—as well as onward routes toward Baglung District.

=== Fuel and EV infrastructure ===
Vehicular services in Tamghas are supported by fuel stations (petrol pumps) located near Udhindhunga and along the main Tansen–Tamghas highway entry, alongside electric vehicle (EV) charging infrastructure established under the Nepal Electricity Authority (NEA) charging network.

=== Air ===
Air connectivity is provided by Resunga Airport ((ICAO: VNRG)), located approximately 5 km south of Tamghas in Simichaur (Ward 10 of Resunga Municipality) at an elevation of 1,529 m (5,015 ft). Commercial operations began in 2023, with Nepal Airlines operating scheduled STOL flights connecting Tamghas to Tribhuvan International Airport in Kathmandu.

== Climate ==
Climate data for Tamghas, elevation 1,700 m (5,600 ft), (1991–2020 normals)
Month	Jan	Feb	Mar	Apr	May	Jun	Jul	Aug	Sep	Oct	Nov	Dec	Year
Mean daily maximum °C (°F)	15.3 (59.5)	17.9 (64.2)	22.1 (71.8)	26.5 (79.7)	26.7 (80.1)	27.2 (81.0)	26.1 (79.0)	26.3 (79.3)	25.8 (78.4)	23.5 (74.3)	19.9 (67.8)	16.4 (61.5)	22.8 (73.0)
Daily mean °C (°F)	9.9 (49.8)	12.2 (54.0)	15.9 (60.6)	19.9 (67.8)	21.4 (70.5)	22.6 (72.7)	22.5 (72.5)	22.5 (72.5)	21.5 (70.7)	18.6 (65.5)	14.5 (58.1)	11.0 (51.8)	17.7 (63.9)
Mean daily minimum °C (°F)	4.4 (39.9)	6.4 (43.5)	9.7 (49.5)	13.3 (55.9)	16.0 (60.8)	18.0 (64.4)	18.9 (66.0)	18.6 (65.5)	17.2 (63.0)	13.6 (56.5)	9.0 (48.2)	5.6 (42.1)	12.6 (54.6)
Average precipitation mm (inches)	25.9 (1.02)	34.2 (1.35)	31.3 (1.23)	55.5 (2.19)	139.5 (5.49)	316.0 (12.44)	496.7 (19.56)	428.6 (16.87)	272.9 (10.74)	49.4 (1.94)	11.4 (0.45)	17.3 (0.68)	1,878.7 (73.96)
Source 1: Department of Hydrology and Meteorology
Source 2: JICA (precipitation)
