= Arkhale =

Arkhale may refer to:

- Arkhale, Lumbini
- Arkhale, Khotang
