= Khadgakot =

Khadgakot खड्गकोट
- Village Development Committee
- Location in Nepal
- Coordinates: 28.09°N 83.56°E
- Country: Nepal
- Zone: Lumbini Zone
- District: Gulmi District

Population (1991)
  - Total: 4,297
- Time zone: UTC+5:45 (Nepal Time)

Situated on the bank of Kaligandaki river, Khadgakot (Nepali: खड्गकोट) is a town and Village Development Committee (Nepali: गाउँ विकास समिति, Gaun Vikas Samiti), in Gulmi District in the Lumbini Zone of central Nepal. At the time of the 1991 Nepal census it had a population of 4297 persons living in 808 individual households.
