= Siseni =

Coordinates: 28°11′N 83°7′E

Siseni सिसेनी
- Village Development Committee
- Interactive map of Siseni
- Country: Nepal
- Zone: Lumbini Zone
- District: Gulmi District

Population (1991)
  - Total: 3,851
- Time zone: UTC+5:45 (Nepal Time)

Siseni is a town and municipality in Gulmi District in the Lumbini Zone of central Nepal. At the time of the 1991 Nepal census it had a population of 3851 persons living in 720 individual households.
