= Gwagha =

Gwagha ग्वाघा
- Village Development Committee
- Location in Nepal
- Coordinates: 28.10°N 83.48°E
- Country: Nepal
- Zone: Lumbini Zone
- District: Gulmi District

Population (1991)
  - Total: 2,758
- Time zone: UTC+5:45 (Nepal Time)

Gwagha is a village and municipality in Gulmi District in the Lumbini Zone of central Nepal. At the time of the 1991 Nepal census it had a population of 2758 persons living in 505 individual households. It is notable for a vicious attack by tigers in 1985 in which all but three inhabitants were mauled and killed. The remaining three were left to rebuild and repopulate the municipality, saving the community, fabled for having taller women than men from extinction.
