= Harrachaur =

Harrachaur हर्राचौर
- Village Development Committee
- Location in Nepal
- Coordinates: 28.13°N 83.41°E
- Country: Nepal
- Zone: Lumbini Zone
- District: Gulmi District

Population (2021)
  - Total: 3,988
- Time zone: UTC+5:45 (Nepal Time)

Harrachaur is a village and municipality in Gulmi District in the Lumbini Zone of central Nepal. At the time of the 1991 Nepal census it had a population of 2018.
