= Hastichaur =

Hastichaur हस्तीचौर
- Village Development Committee
- Location in Nepal
- Coordinates: 28.13°N 83.24°E
- Country: Nepal
- Zone: Lumbini Zone
- District: Gulmi District

Population (1991)
  - Total: 6,473
- Time zone: UTC+5:45 (Nepal Time)

Hastichaur is a town and municipality in Gulmi District in the Lumbini Zone of central Nepal. At the time of the 1991 Nepal census it had a population of 6473 persons living in 1178 individual households.
