= Bhanbhane =

Bhanbhane भन्भने
- Village Development Committee
- Country: Nepal
- Zone: Lumbini Zone
- District: Gulmi District

Population (1991)
  - Total: 3,103
- Time zone: UTC+5:45 (Nepal Time)

Bhanbhane is a town and municipality in Gulmi District in the Lumbini Zone of central Nepal. According to the 1991 Nepal census, it had a population of 3103 people living in 607 individual households.
