= Nayagaun =

Nayagaun नयाँगाउँ
- Village Development Committee
- Interactive map of Nayagaun
- Country: Nepal
- Zone: Lumbini Zone
- District: Gulmi District

Population (1991)
  - Total: 4,070
- Time zone: UTC+5:45 (Nepal Time)

Nayagaun is a Village and Ward Number one of Dhurkot rural municipality in Gulmi District in the Lumbini Zone of central Nepal. At the time of the 1991 Nepal census it had a population of 4070 persons living in 818 individual households.
