= Dalamchaur =

Dalamchaur दलामचौर
- Village Development Committee
- Location in Nepal
- Coordinates: 28.16°N 83.22°E
- Country: Nepal
- Zone: Lumbini Zone
- District: Gulmi District

Population (1991)
  - Total: 2,597
- Time zone: UTC+5:45 (Nepal Time)

Dalamchaur is a village and municipality in Gulmi District in the Lumbini Zone of central Nepal. At the time of the 1991 Nepal census it had a population of 2597 persons living in 524 individual households.
