= Bastu =

Village in the Lumbini Zone of central Nepal

Coordinates: 28°06′N 83°10′E

Bastu वस्तु
- Village Development Committee
- Interactive map of Bastu
- Country: Nepal
- Zone: Lumbini Zone
- District: Gulmi District

Population (1991)
  - Total: 3,007
- Time zone: UTC+5:45 (Nepal Time)

Bastu is also the Swedish word for sauna.

Bastu is a village and municipality in Gulmi District in the Lumbini Zone of central Nepal. At the time of the 1991 Nepal census it had a population of 3007 persons living in 626 individual households.
