= Jaisithok =

Coordinates: 28°6′N 83°10′E

Jaisithok जैसीथोक
- Village Development Committee
- Interactive map of Jaisithok
- Country: Nepal
- Zone: Lumbini Zone
- District: Gulmi District

Population (1991)
  - Total: 2,938
- Time zone: UTC+5:45 (Nepal Time)

Jaisithok is a village and municipality in Gulmi District in the Lumbini Zone of central Nepal. At the time of the 1991 Nepal census it had a population of 2938.
