= Birbas =

Birbas बीरबास
- Village Development Committee
- Location in Nepal
- Coordinates: 28.02°N 83.32°E
- Country: Nepal
- Zone: Lumbini Zone
- District: Gulmi District

Population (1991)
  - Total: 4,378
- Time zone: UTC+5:45 (Nepal Time)

Birbas is a town and municipality in Gulmi District in the Lumbini Zone of central Nepal. At the time of the 1991 Nepal census it had a population of 4378 people living in 842 individual households.
