= Paudi Amarahi =

Coordinates: 28°13′N 83°14′E

Paudi Amarahi पौडी अमराही अरेवा
- Village Development Committee
- Interactive map of Paudi Amarahi
- Country: Nepal
- Zone: Lumbini Zone
- District: Gulmi District

Population (1991)
  - Total: 4,136
- Time zone: UTC+5:45 (Nepal Time)

Paudi Amarahi is a town and municipality in Gulmi District in the Lumbini Zone of central Nepal. At the time of the 1991 Nepal census it had a population of 4136 persons living in 742 individual households.
