= Hadinete =

Hadinete हाँडीनेटे
- Village Development Committee
- Interactive map of Hadinete
- Country: Nepal
- Zone: Lumbini Zone
- District: Gulmi District

Population (1991)
  - Total: 5,830
- Time zone: UTC+5:45 (Nepal Time)

Hadinete is a town and municipality in the Gulmi District of the Lumbini Zone in central Nepal. In the 1991 Nepal census it has a population of 5830 living in 1139 households.
