= Barbot =

Barbot is a surname of French origin. Notable people with the surname include:

- Clément Barbot (1914–1963), aide to Haitian President Francois Duvalier
- Gabrielle-Suzanne Barbot de Villeneuve (1695–1755), French writer
- Joseph-Théodore-Désiré Barbot (1824–1879), French operatic tenor
- Matt Barbot, Nuyorican playwright
- Oxiris Barbot (born 1965/66), American Commissioner of Health of the City of New York
- Sammy Barbot (born 1949), stage name of Jacques Édouard Barbot, Caribbean entertainer, singer and television presenter
- Stanley Barbot (1962–2009), Haitian-American radio personality
- Vivian Barbot (born 1941), Canadian teacher, activist, and politician

== See also ==
- Roboexotica, also known as barbot festivals, robotics festival for the building of 'cocktail robots'
- Barbat (disambiguation)
