= Rupakot Gulmi =

Rupakot Gulmi रूपाकोट गुल्मी
- Village
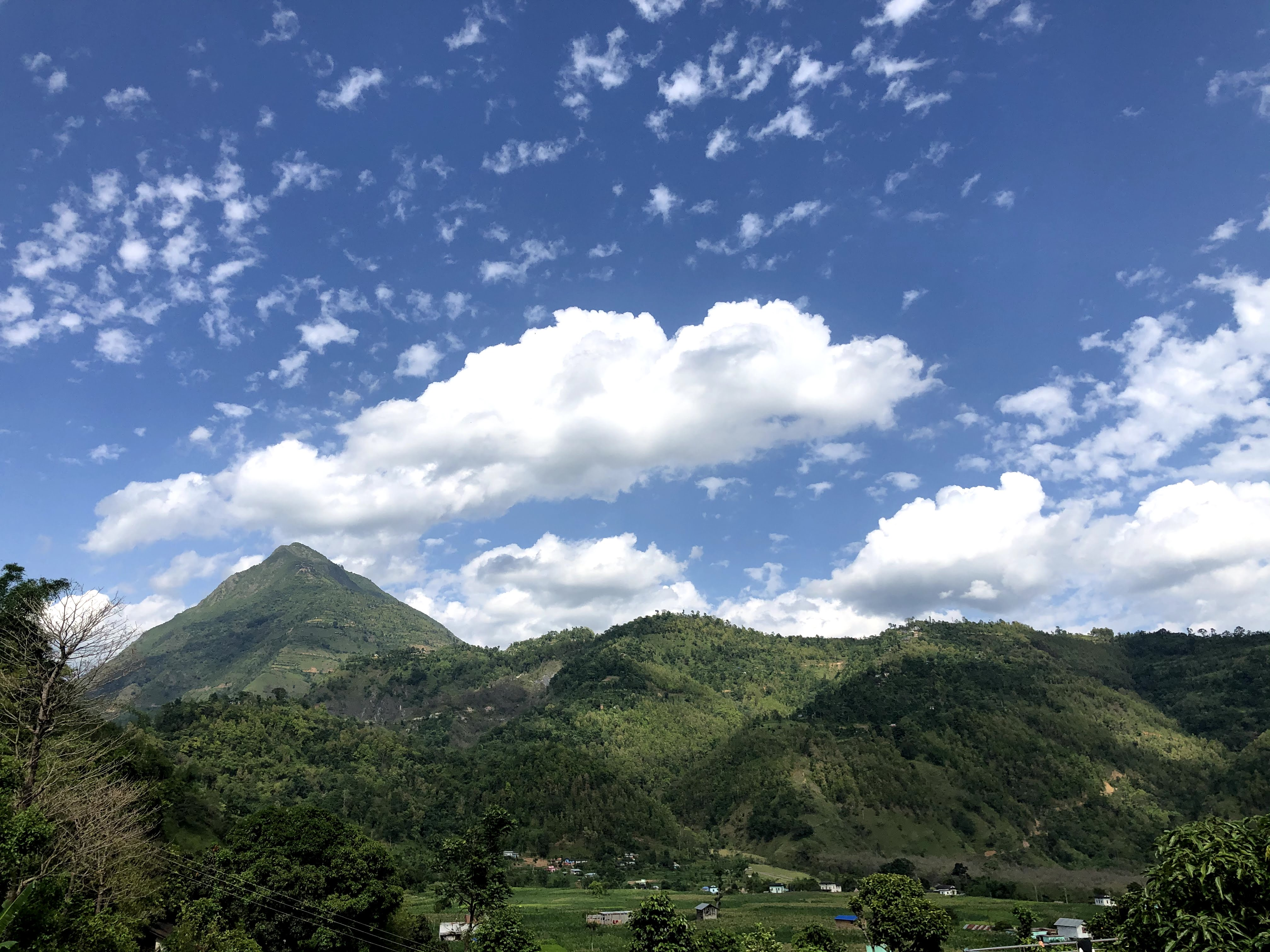
- Hills of Rupakot as seen from the plains of Damuka
- Interactive map of Rupakot Gulmi
- Coordinates: 28°4′N 83°22′E
- Country: Nepal
- Municipality: Chandrakot Rural Municipality
- Ward: 7
- District: Gulmi District
- Established: 1870 B.S.

Government
  - Type: Democratic

Population (2021)
  - Total: 2,666
  - Literacy: 74.7%
- Time zone: UTC+5:45 (Nepal Time)
- A.O.P. (Area Post Office): 32604
- Area code: 079

Rupakot is a Village in Gulmi District in the Lumbini Province of central Nepal. Its headquarters is in Myalpokhara. It is located in the center of Gulmi District. It is surrounded by hills. Its main religion is Hinduism. There are many temples like Chhatra Thaan, Shiddababa Temple, Shiva Temple, Ram Temple, Debi Deurali Temple etc. The main sources of revenue for the village are agriculture and foreign employment. At the time of the 2021 Nepal census, it had a population of 2666 where 44.9% are male and 55.1% are female. The most populated parts of this VDC is Damuka, Sota & Ekle Pipal.
