= Hadahade =

Motikhark Sima मोतिखर्क सीमा
- Village Development Committee
- Location in Nepal
- Coordinates: 28.10°N 83.11°E
- Country: Nepal
- Zone: Lumbini Zone
- District: Gulmi District

Population (1991)
  - Total: 3,323
- Time zone: UTC+5:45 (Nepal Time)

Hadahade is a Village Development Committee Gulmi District in the Lumbini Zone of the western region of Nepal. At the time of the 2001 Nepal census, it had a population of 3323 persons living in 667 individual households. Motikhark is one of the known places – the heart of Hadahade.
