= Aaglung =

Aaglung आगलुङ
- Village Development Committee
- Location in Nepal
- Coordinates: 28.22°N 83.05°E
- Country: Nepal
- Zone: Lumbini Zone
- District: Gulmi District

Population (2011)
  - Total: 3,634
- Time zone: UTC+5:45 (Nepal Time)
- Area code: +977-079
- Website: ddcgulmi.gov.np

VDC Map of Gulmi District.

Aaglung (Nepali: आगलुङ) is a village and municipality in Gulmi District in the Lumbini Zone of central Nepal. At the time of the 2011 Nepal census it had a population of 3634 persons living in 701 individual households.
