= Turang =

Turang तुराङ
- Village Development Committee
- Location in Nepal
- Coordinates: 28.10°N 83.37°E
- Country: Nepal
- Zone: Lumbini Zone
- District: Gulmi District

Population (1991)
  - Total: 4,383
- Time zone: UTC+5:45 (Nepal Time)

Turang is 8 number ward of Chandrakot Rural Municipality in Gulmi District in the Province No. 5 of Nepal. At the time of the 1991 Nepal census it had a population of 4383 persons living in 1044 individual households. Majuwa Bazer is the economic and educational center of this place where people from Jubhung, Balithum, Rupakot and Aanpchour visit for shopping, education and other official works. Manaka Tikaram Multiple College, Gyanodaya Higher Secondary School and Polaris Secondary Boarding School are the famous educational institutions of this place. Notable person are Sompal Kami (National Cricket Team )
