= Bajhketeri =

Coordinates: 28°12′N 83°4′E

Bajhketeri बाँझकटेरी
- Village Development Committee
- Interactive map of Bajhketeri
- Country: Nepal
- Zone: Lumbini Zone
- District: Gulmi District

Population (1991)
  - Total: 2,984
- Time zone: UTC+5:45 (Nepal Time)

Bajhketeri is a village and municipality in Gulmi District in the Lumbini Zone of central Nepal. At the time of the 1991 Nepal census it had a population of 2984 persons living in 554 individual households.
