= Barbatus =

Barbatus is a word of Latin origin meaning "bearded". It can refer to:

== People ==
- Barbatus of Benevento (c. 610 – 682), bishop of Benevento from 663 to 682
- John Varvatos, American contemporary high fashion menswear designer
- Lucius Cornelius Scipio Barbatus (died c. 280 BC), one of the two elected Roman consuls in 298 BC
- Marcus Horatius Barbatus, one of two consuls who were said to have replaced the decemvirs in 449 BC
- Marcus Valerius Messalla Barbatus (11 BC - AD 20/21) was a consul of ancient Rome

== Other ==
- 8978 Barbatus (3109 T-3), an outer main-belt asteroid discovered on October 16, 1977

== See also ==
- Barbat (disambiguation)
