= Bamgha =

Bamgha बाम्घा
- Village Development Committee
- Location in Nepal
- Coordinates: 28.01°N 83.41°E
- Country: Nepal
- Zone: Lumbini Zone
- District: Gulmi District

Population (1991)
  - Total: 3,770
- Time zone: UTC+5:45 (Nepal Time)

Bamgha is a town and municipality in Gulmi District in the Lumbini Zone of central Nepal. At the time of the 1991 Nepal census it had a population of 3770 persons living in 718 individual households.
