= Reemuwa =

Rimuwa रिमुवा
- Village Development Committee
- Location in Nepal
- Coordinates: 28.00°N 83.44°E
- Country: Nepal
- Zone: Lumbini Zone
- District: Gulmi District

Population (1991)
  - Total: 2,487
- Time zone: UTC+5:45 (Nepal Time)

Rimuwa is a village and municipality in Gulmi District in the Lumbini Zone of central Nepal. At the time of the 1991 Nepal census it had a population of 2487 persons living in 478 individual households.
