= Aslewa =

Aslewa VDC अस्लेवा
- Village Development Committee (VDC)
- Location in Nepal
- Coordinates: 27.99°N 83.48°E
- Country: Nepal
- Zone: Lumbini Zone
- District: Gulmi

Population (2013)
  - Total: 8,088
- Time zone: UTC+5:45 (Nepal Time)
- Postal Code: 32605
- Area code: 079 (Gulmi)

Aslewa is a village development committee (VDC) in Gulmi District in the Lumbini Zone of central Nepal. At the time of the 1991 Nepal census it had a population of 8088 persons living in 992 individual households. The village has a temple called Rudra Beni Dhaam and a school for higher level study, the Shree Janata Higher Secondary School.
