= Wamitaksar =

Wami Taksar वामीटक्सार Wamitaksar
- Town
- Location in Nepal Wami Taksar (Nepal)
- Coordinates: 28°11′N 83°18′E
- Country: Nepal
- Municipality: Musikot Municipality
- District: Gulmi District
- Elevation: 872 m (2,861 ft)

Population (1991)
  - Total: 6,421
- Time zone: UTC+5:45 (Nepal Time)

Wamitaksar (Nepali: वामीटक्सार) is a town in Gulmi District part of the Musikot Municipality. At the time of the 1991 Nepal census it had a population of 6421. It serves as the headquarters of the Musikot Municipality.

== Gallery ==
Landscapes and Climates of Wamitaksar

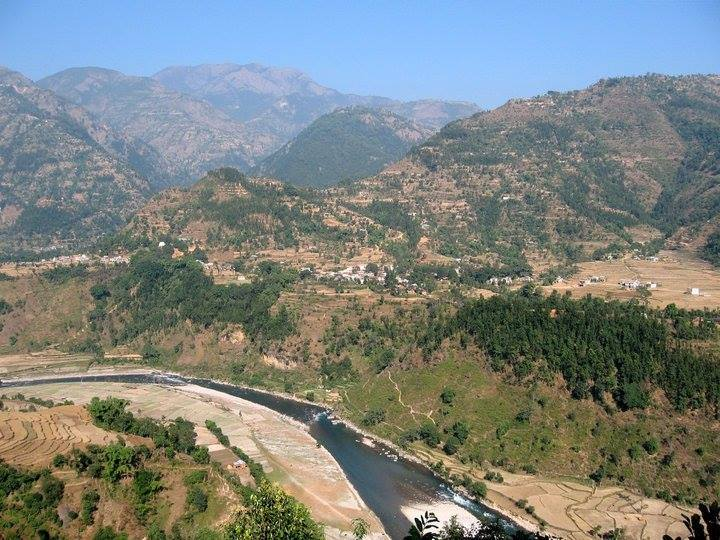
Badighat

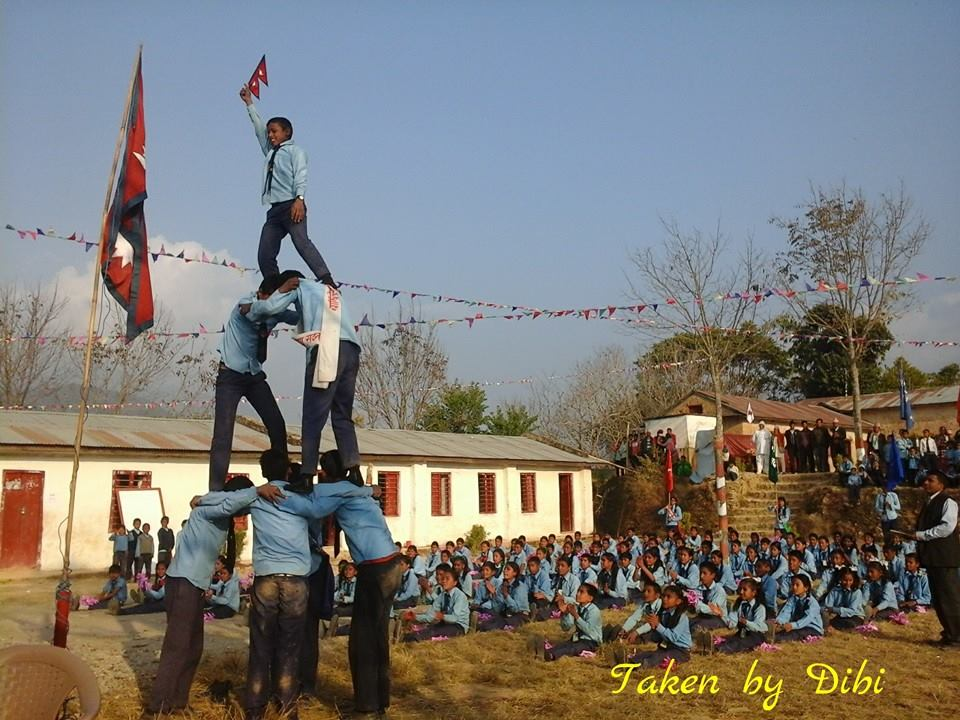
People holding Flag of Nepal

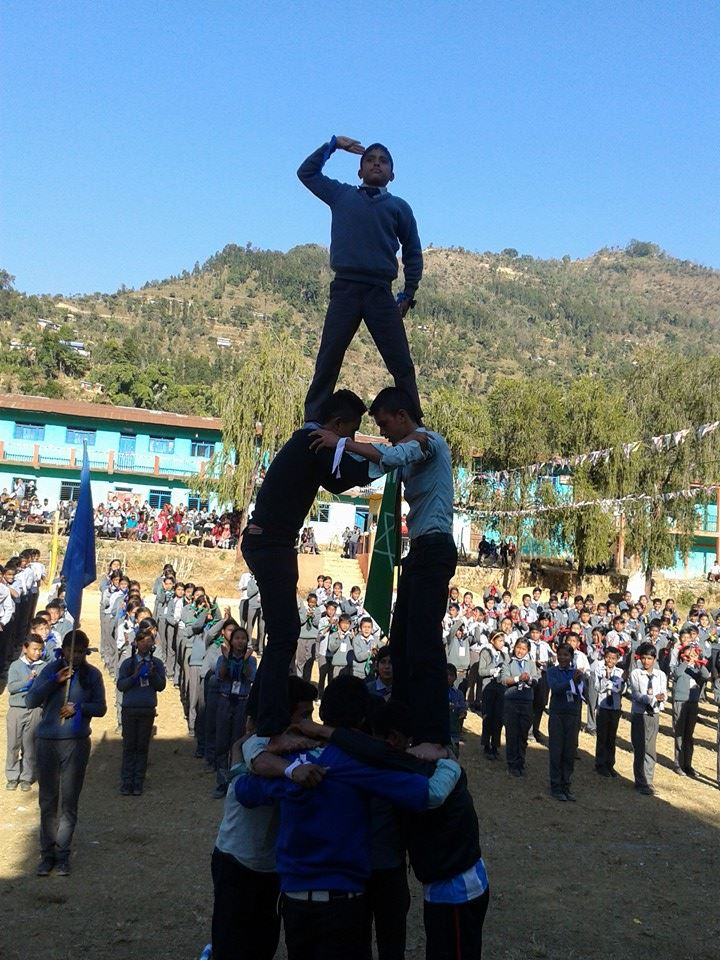
Salute to Mother Nepal
