= Arkhale, Gulmi =

Gulmi arkhale Gulmi arkhale
- Nickname: Gulmi arkhale
- Interactive map of Gulmi arkhale
- Country: Nepal
- Zone: Lumbini Zone Gulmi arkhale ward no:7
- District: Gulmi District

Population (1991)
  - Total: 6,196
- Time zone: UTC+5:45 (Nepal Time)
- Postal code: 32600
- Area code: +977
- Website: www.facebook.com/gulmiarkhale

Gulmi Arkhale is a business center in Resunga Municipality in Gulmi District in the Lumbini Zone of central Nepal. The district, with Tamghas as its headquarters, at the time of the 1991 Nepal census, it had a population of 6196 people residing in arkhale 1165 individual households.
