= Purkot Daha =

Village Development Committee in Lumbini Zone, Nepal

Purkot Daha पुर्कोट दह
- Village Development Committee
- Location in Nepal
- Coordinates: 28.15°N 83.08°E
- Country: Nepal
- Zone: Lumbini Zone
- District: Gulmi District

Population (2001)
  - Total: 9,918
- Time zone: UTC+5:45 (Nepal Time)

Purkot Daha is the administrative headquarter of Madane Rural Municipality which is in Lumbini province of Nepal. As of the 2001 Nepal Census, it had a population of 9,918, including 1,765 individual households.
