= Johang =

Johang VDC जोहाङ गाबिस
- Village Development committee
- Location in Nepal
- Coordinates: 28.04°N 83.43°E
- Country: Nepal
- Zones: Lumbini
- District: Gulmi

Government VDC
  - Type: Local Government

Population (2011)
  - Total: about 10,000
- Time zone: UTC+5:45 (Nepal Time)

Johang is a Village Development Committee VDC in Gulmi District in the Lumbini Zone of Western Nepal. At the time of the 2011 Nepal census it had a population of about 10000 living in 1509 individual households.
