= Badighat River =

River in Nepal

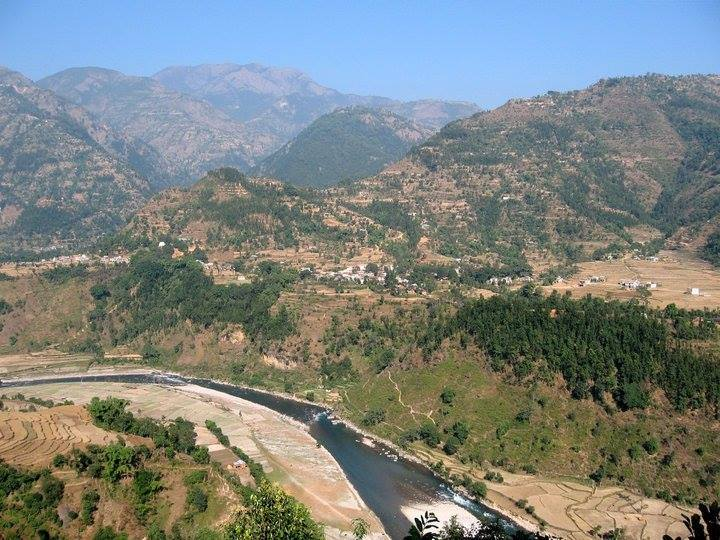
The Badighat River

The Badighat River or Badigad is a river in Gulmi District, Nepal.
