= Myal Pokhari =

Myal Pokhari म्यालपोखरी
- Ward No. 4 of Madane Rural Municipality
- Location in Nepal
- Coordinates: 28.18°N 83.07°E
- Country: Nepal
- Zone: Lumbini Zone
- District: Gulmi District

Population (1991)
  - Total: 2,282
- Time zone: UTC+5:45 (Nepal Time)

Myal Pokhari is a village and municipality in Gulmi District in the Lumbini Zone of central Nepal. At the time of the 1991 Nepal census it had a population of 2282.
