= Purtighat =

Purtighat पुर्तिघाट radha krishna tol
- Village Development Committee
- Location in Nepal
- Coordinates: 28.05°N 83.55°E
- Country: Nepal
- Zone: Lumbini Zone
- District: Gulmi District

Population (1991)
  - Total: 2,445
- Time zone: UTC+5:45 (Nepal Time)

Purtighat is a village and municipality in Gulmi District in the Lumbini Zone of central Nepal. At the time of the 2011 Nepal census it had a male population 904, female population 1140 & total population of 2044 persons living in 436 individual households.
