= Dhurkot Rajasthal =

Dhurkot Rajasthal(Pritam Pc) धुर्कोट राजस्थल
- Village Development Committee
- Location in Nepal
- Coordinates: 28.13°N 83.14°E
- Country: Nepal
- Zone: Lumbini Zone
- District: Gulmi District

Population (1991)
  - Total: 3,354
- Time zone: UTC+5:45 (Nepal Time)

Dhurkot Rajasthal is a town and municipality in Gulmi District in the Lumbini Zone of central Nepal. At the time of the 1991 Nepal census it had a population of 3354.
