= Kharjyang =

Kharjyang खर्ज्याङ
- Village Development Committee
- Location in Nepal
- Coordinates: 27.97°N 83.33°E
- Country: Nepal
- Zone: Lumbini Zone
- District: Gulmi District

Population (1991)
  - Total: 3,227
- Time zone: UTC+5:45 (Nepal Time)

Kharjyang is a town and municipality in Gulmi District in the Lumbini Zone of central Nepal. At the time of the 1991 Nepal census it had a population of 3227 living in 615 households.
