= Phoksing =

Phoksing फोक्सिङ
- Village Development Committee
- Location in Nepal
- Coordinates: 28.06°N 83.51°E
- Country: Nepal
- Zone: Lumbini Zone
- District: Gulmi District

Population (1991)
  - Total: 3,102
- Time zone: UTC+5:45 (Nepal Time)

Phoksing is a Village Development Committee in Gulmi District in the Lumbini Zone of central Nepal. At the time of the 1991 Nepal census it had a population of 3102 persons living in 579 individual households.
