= Dirbung =

Dirbung डिब्रुङ
- Village Development Committee
- Location in Nepal
- Coordinates: 28.14°N 83.37°E
- Country: Nepal
- Zone: Lumbini Zone
- District: Gulmi District

Population (1991)
  - Total: 2,515
- Time zone: UTC+5:45 (Nepal Time)

Dirbung is a village and municipality in Gulmi District in the Lumbini Zone of central Nepal. At the time of the 1991 Nepal census it had a population of 2515 persons living in 432 individual households.
