= Barbat =

Barbat may refer to:

- Bărbat, early Romanian voivode
- Barbat, Croatia, a village on the island of Rab, Croatia
- Bărbat River in Romania
- Barbat (lute), an ancient Persian plucked lute (Persian: بربط or Arabic: عود)
- Luis Barbat, Uruguayan football goalkeeper

== See also ==
- Barbatus (disambiguation)
- Barbot (disambiguation)
