= Isma Rajasthal =

Coordinates: 28°11′N 83°12′E

Isma Rajasthal इस्मा रजस्थल
- Village Development Committee
- Interactive map of Isma Rajasthal
- Country: Nepal
- Zone: Lumbini Zone
- District: Gulmi District

Population (1991)
  - Total: 2,974
- Time zone: UTC+5:45 (Nepal Time)

Isma Rajasthal is a Village Development Committee in Gulmi District in the Lumbini Zone of central Nepal. At the time of the 1991 Nepal census it had a population of 2974 persons living in 568 individual households. joitikhola rajasthal 1
