= Shantipur, Gulmi =

Shantipur, Lumbini शान्तिपुर
- Town
- Location in Nepal
- Coordinates: 28.12°N 83.45°E
- Country: Nepal
- Zone: Lumbini Zone
- District: Gulmi District

Population (1991)
  - Total: 1,855
- Time zone: UTC+5:45 (Nepal Time)

Shantipur is a village and rural municipality in Gulmi District in the Lumbini Zone of central Nepal. Shantipur situated in the banks of Hugdi Khola which merged to the Kaligandaki river.

== Overview ==
According to 2021 Nepal census Shantipur has a population of 3872 with a total of about 1120 households. It comes under the chandrakot rural municipality ward no- 4. It has a school of udaya school and chakreshwor school with the prestigious academic records. It is also the head office of chandrakot rural municipality.
