= Digam =

Digam दिगाम
- Village Development Committee
- Location in Nepal
- Coordinates: 27.98°N 83.37°E
- Country: Nepal
- Zone: Lumbini Zone
- District: Gulmi District

Population (1991)
  - Total: 5,024
- Time zone: UTC+5:45 (Nepal Time)

Digam is a town and municipality in Gulmi District in the Lumbini Zone of central Nepal. At the time of the 1991 Nepal census, it had a population of 5,024 people living in 895 individual households.
