= Limgha =

Limgha सत्यवती गाउपलिका वार्ड नम्बर ४ लिम्घा Satyawati municipality
- village council
- Location in Nepal
- Coordinates: 28.02°N 83.48°E
- Country: Nepal
- Zone: Lumbini Zone
- District: Gulmi District
- Ward President: 2017 to 2022

Government
  - Ward President: Mr. Dan Bahadur Rana

Population (1991)
  - Total: 3,285
- Time zone: UTC+5:45 (Nepal Time)

Limgha (सत्यवती गाउपलिका वार्ड नम्बर ४ लिम्घा) is a rural municipality ward no 4 and (सत्यवती) village council ward no 4 in Gulmi District in the Lumbini Zone of central Nepal. At the time of the 1991 Nepal census it had a population of 3285 persons living in 665 individual households.

== Gallery ==
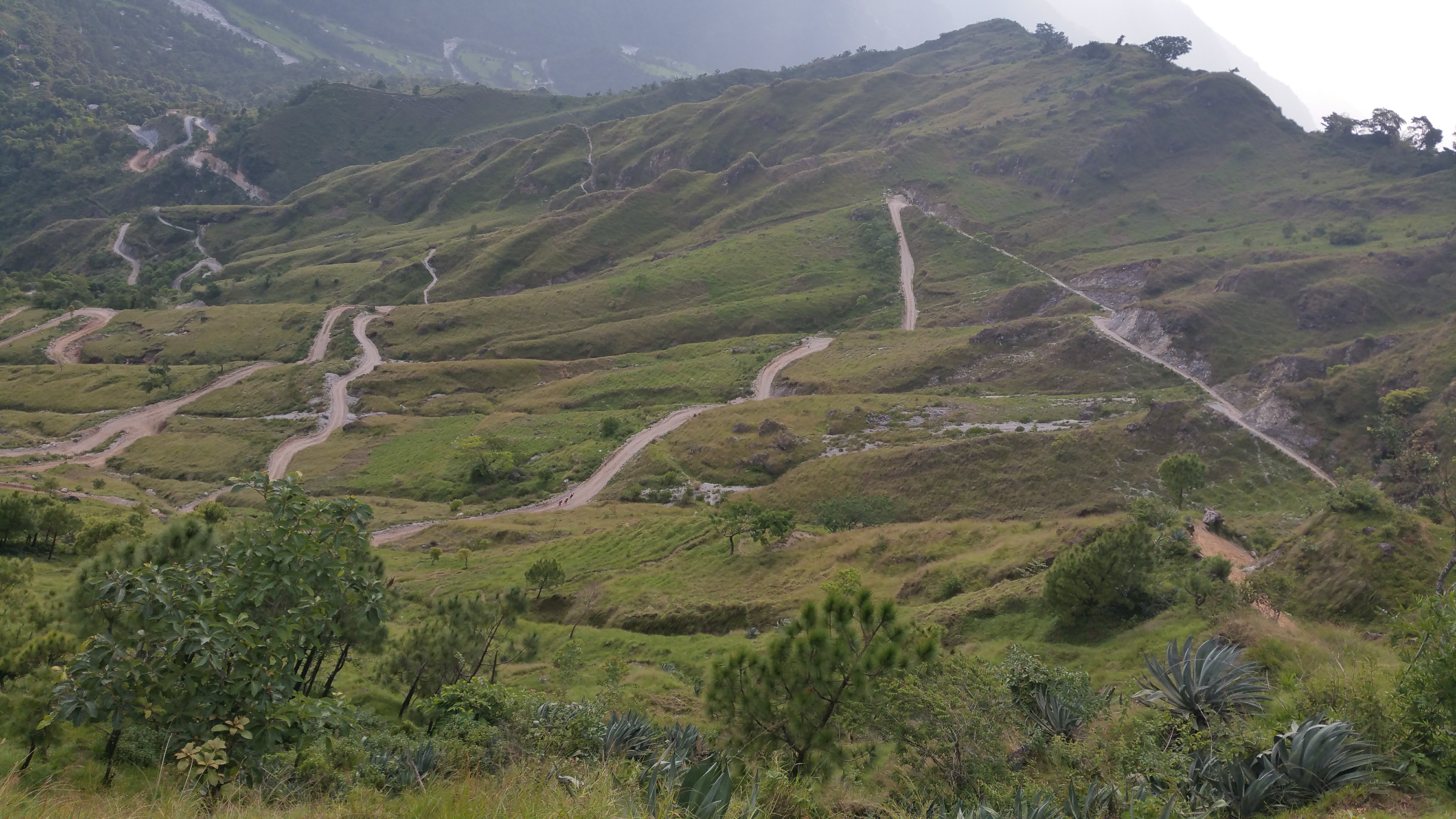
Limgha Village

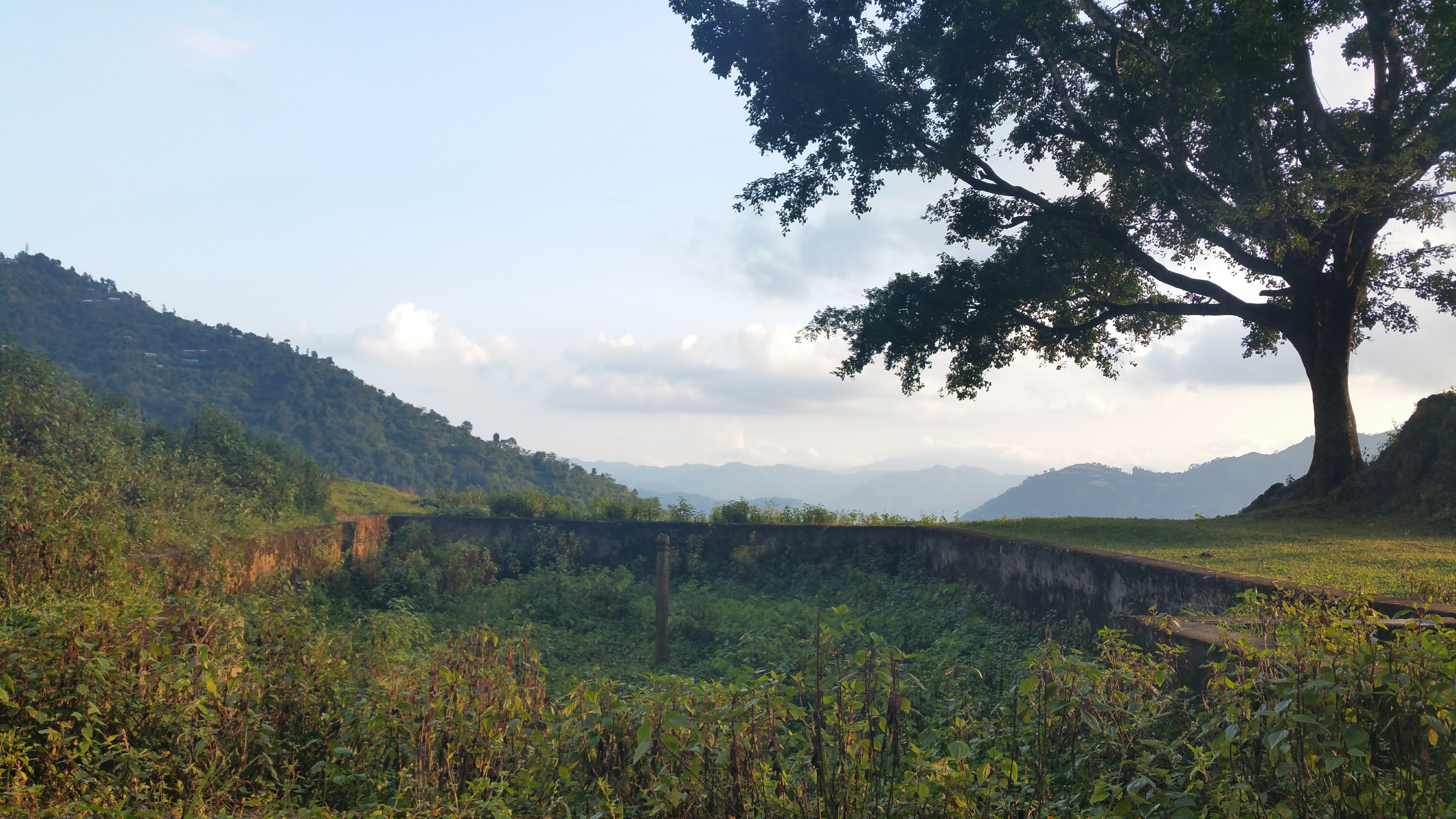
Limgah Village

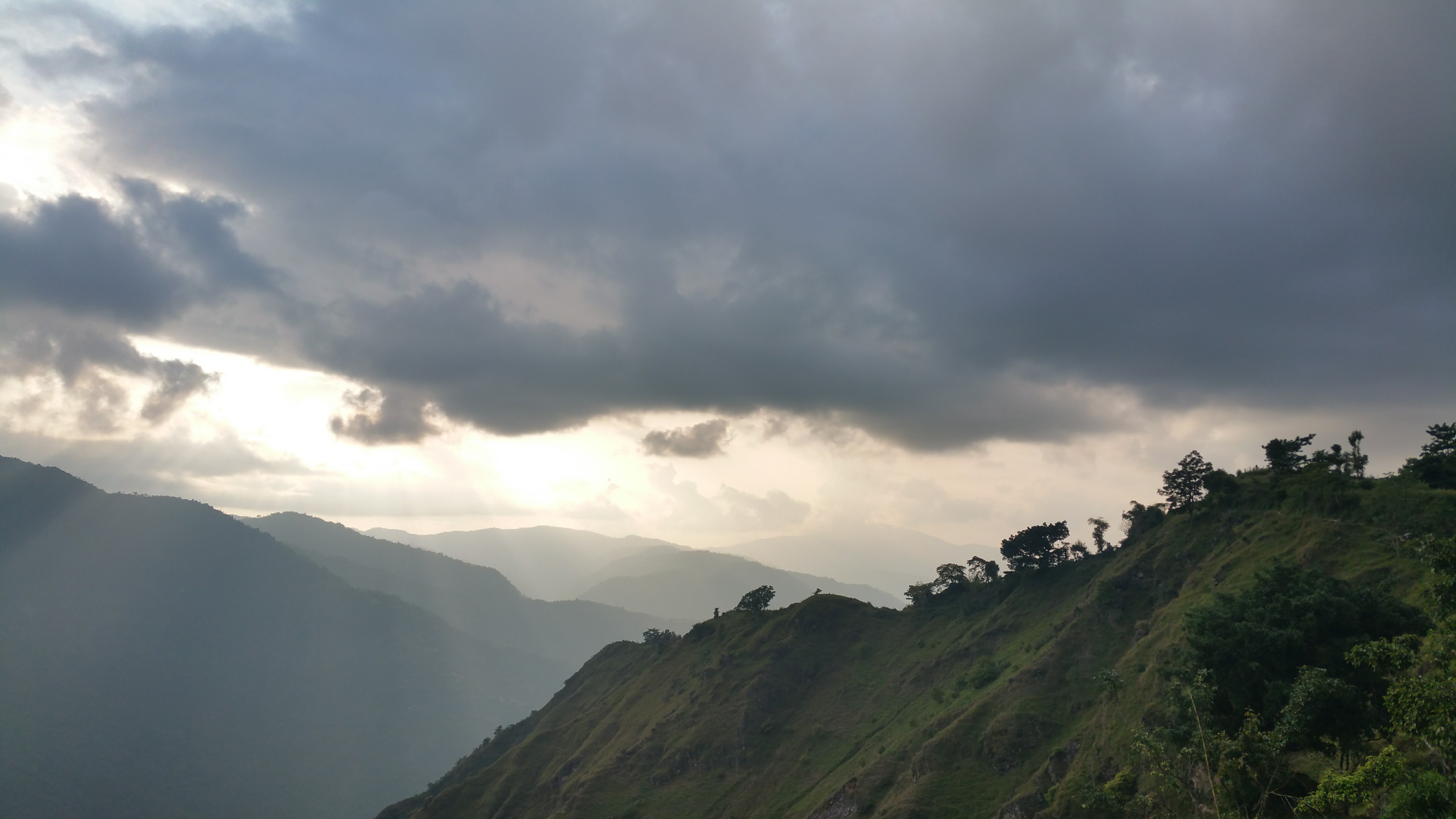
Limgha Village

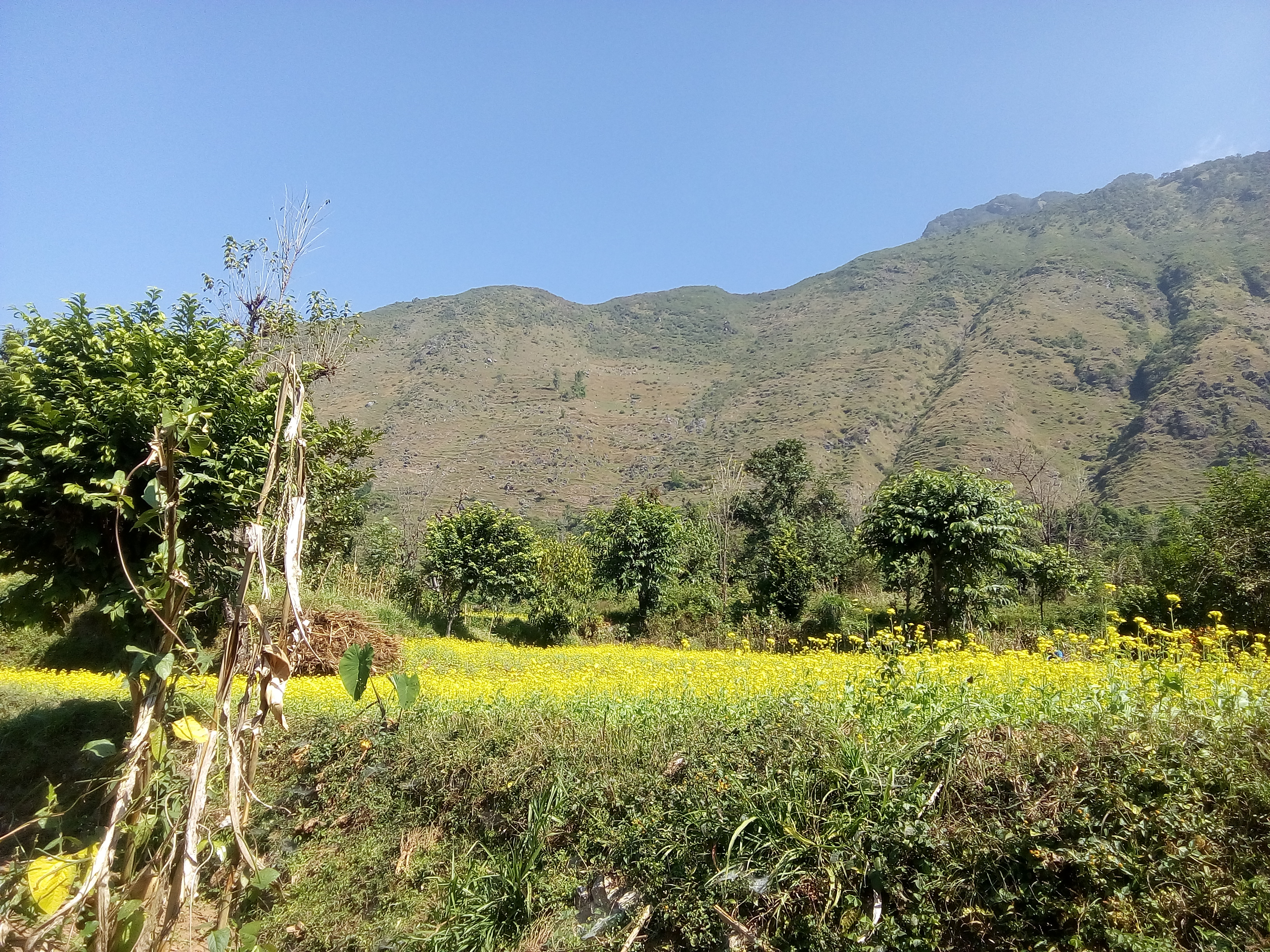
Limgha Vdc
