= Amar Abathok =

Place in Nepal

Coordinates: 27°59′N 83°18′E

Amar Abathok अमर अबाथोक
- Village Development Committee
- Interactive map of Amar Abathok
- Country: Nepal
- Zone: Lumbini Zone
- District: Gulmi District

Population (2011)
  - Total: 1,943
- Time zone: UTC+5:45 (Nepal Time)
- Area code: +977-079
- Website: ddcgulmi.gov.np

Amar Arbathok is a village and municipality in Gulmi District in the Lumbini Zone of central Nepal. At the time of the 2011 Nepal census it had a population of 1943 people living in 476 households.
