= Simichaur =

- Location in Nepal
- Coordinates: 28.03°N 83.25°E
- Country: Nepal
- Zone: Lumbini Zone
- District: Gulmi District

Population (1991)
  - Total: 4,811
- Time zone: UTC+5:45 (Nepal Time)

Simichaur is a town in Resunga Municipality in Gulmi District in the Lumbini Zone of central Nepal. At the time of the 1991 Nepal census it had a population of 4811 persons living in 942 individual households. Almost 99% of the people are Hindus.

There used to be nine wards in this VDC before it was incorporated in Resunga Municipality. In 2017, Simichaur consists of 2 words of the new municipality.

Simichaur is full of diversity with people belonging to many castes, ethnicity and political views.

Arjun in the north is the tallest hill in Simichaur.

Government is constructing the district's only airport at Thalemale, Simichaur.

Simichaur has many temples such as Kalika temple, Devi Temple, Malika Temple, Arjun Temple, and Juredhunga Temples.

Simichaur has two secondary schools and many primary schools.

While Simichaur is adjacent to Tamghas, the headquarters of the district, many residents are leaving the village to Butwal and other surrounding areas in Tarai for better living conditions. If this trend continues, the village will lose its significant population.
