= Baletaksar =

Baletaksar बले टक्सार
- Village Development Committee
- Location in Nepal
- Coordinates: 27.99°N 83.40°E
- Country: Nepal
- Zone: Lumbini Zone
- District: Gulmi District

Population (1991)
  - Total: 4,487
- Time zone: UTC+5:45 (Nepal Time)

Baletaksar is a small town in Gulmi District in the Lumbini Zone of central Nepal. At the time of the 1991 Nepal census it had a population of 4487 persons living in 886 individual households.
