= Resunga Municipality =

Resunga Municipality रेसुङ्गा नगरपालिका
- Municipality
- Location in Nepal
- Coordinates: 28°4′N 83°15′E
- Country: Nepal
- Province: Lumbini Province
- District: Gulmi

Government
  - Type: Municipality
  - Mayor: Khil Dhwaj Panthi (NC)
  - Deputy Mayor: Amrita Devi Kunwar (NC)

Population (2021)
  - Total: 31,551
- Time zone: UTC+5:45 (NST)
- Website: www.resungamun.gov.np

Resunga Municipality is a municipality in Gulmi District in Nepal. The municipality was established by the government on 18 May 2014 by merging the four existing village development committees of Arkhale, Dubichaur, Simichaur and Tamghas. The municipality is named after the holy place Resunga in Gulmi District.
