= Matt Barbot =

Puerto Rican Playwright

- Born: Brooklyn, New York
- Writing career
- Notable works: El Coquí Espectácular and the Bottle of Doom
- Website: twitter.com/BarbotRobot

Matt Barbot is a Nuyorican playwright based in Brooklyn, New York. Barbot worked as an actor before becoming a playwright at the age of 26 with his first play, Infallibility. His best-known play was El Coquí Espectácular and the Bottle of Doom.His play A List of Some Shit I've Killed was published in the anthology Red Bull Shorts Volume III.

== Early life ==
Barbot was born and raised in a Puerto Rican family in Brooklyn, New York where he attended Regis High School, a Jesuit High School. In his Church History course he found a "window into Catholicism," later inspiring his work Infallibility. Barbot began to write and perform in high school, including original oratories as both a Freshman and Sophomore. Barbot received degrees in Creative Writing and Theater at Franklin and Marshall College in Lancaster, PA and an MFA from Columbia University School of the Arts.

== Career ==
Barbot had experience as an actor before becoming a playwright, having performed in "A Letter From Omdurman" and other plays at the Flea Theater. Although writing and producing plays is his main focus, as a fan of comics, Barbot worked as an editor and writer with comic book creator Edgardo Miranda Rodriguez for Somos Arte's La Borinqueñ and Darryl Makes Comics' DMC.

Barbot's produced his first play Infallibility when he was 26 years old. Infallibility focuses on questioning religion, faith, and identity. The play is the story of an 18-year-old deacon named Carlos, tricked into impersonating a dead pope's voice in a trial where he ends up in jail. The play is set in the jail and performed for the prison guards. Infallibility was produced in 2014 as a part of the annual New York International Fringe Festival, and was one of Indie Theater Now's Best of FringeNYC 2014.

Barbot's next play, Princess Clara of Loisaida, was written in 2015 and produced in a workshop at Columbia University School of the Arts in 2016. The play uses magic realism to tell the story of siblings living in New York. With their mother deceased and their father catatonic, Jose tells magical stories of his younger sister as a fairy princess. They discover Fefu, a fairy scout whose goal is to bring Clara to the magical realm. A coming of age story, the play analyzes themes of identity, wealth, and family. Princess Clara of Loisaida was a finalist for the Latinx Theatre Commons' 2018 Carnaval of New Latinx Work and for the Columbia@Roundabout New Play Series.

Barbot's best-known play, El Coquí Espectácular and the Bottle of Doom premiered at the Two River Theater on January 8, 2018. The play was performed at The Brick's Comic Book Theater Festival, the Julia De Burgos Performing Arts Center, and the Sheen Center Theater Festival of Catholic Playwrights. The play examines Latin ethnicity and identity through a magic realism lens and comic book reality. Barbot uses the metaphor of vejigante masks from Puerto Rico to exemplify a Puerto Rican superhero. Barbot was inspired by vejigante masks and superheroes in comic books and cartoons. As a playwright these concepts merged and the story of El Coquí was formed. In the play, Alex Nuñez, an out of work comic book creator, creates a Nuyorican superhero named El Coquí Espectácular. Putting on a vigilante mask, Alex Nuñez takes on the character's identity at night to protect his Brooklyn neighborhood of Sunset Park from gentrification and corporations. El Coquí was a finalist in the 2014 Repertorio Español Nuestras Voces competition and received two Kennedy Center awards.

Barbot's work has been read and performed at Dixon Place, the Flea Theater, the Brick, Two River Theater, INTAR, and the Lucille Lortel Theatre.

Barbot has also worked for Remezcla, a Latinx digital media company where he wrote and produced commercial work, such as "The Perfect Play" a short film for Pepsi shot in Harlem that featured New York Giants' Victor Cruz. Barbot also produced a web-series "Bodega Chat" for Brisk Iced Tea.

In 2018, Barbot's play A List of Some Shit I've Killed was published in the anthology Red Bull Shorts Volume III. The play is about the story of Heracles' Bow, told backwards and through the lens of toxic masculinity, examines how "men ruin everything". He was named a New York Theatre Workshop 2019-2020 2050 Artistic Fellow.

=== List of plays ===
Barbot's full list of plays is: Faith; Somewhere a Place; A Mostly True Story About F. Scott Fitzgerald's Penis; O, Little Town; The Tragedy of Sultan Khalid bin Barghash or, The Entire Anglo-Zanzibar War in Real Time; Boldly Go; A List of Some Shit I've Killed; Infallibility; Princess Clara of Loisaida; Saints Go Marching; and El Coquí Espectacular and the Bottle of Doom.

== Awards ==
List of Awards and Recognition
| El Coquí Espectácular and the Bottle of Doom | Kennedy Center's Darrel Ayers Award for Outstanding Student-Written Play for Young Audiences Kennedy Center's Latinidad Award for Outstanding Play Written by a Student of Latino/Hispanic Heritage Finalist in the 2014 Repertorio Español Nuestras Voces competition |
| Infallibility | Named one of Indie Theater Now's Best of FringeNYC 2013 |
| Princess Clara of Loisaida | Finalist for the Latinx Theatre Commons' 2018 Carnaval of New Latinx Work Finalist for Columbia@Roundabout New Play Series |
| Saints Go Marching | Semifinalist for the Eugene O'Neill Theater Center's National Playwrights Conference |
