= Kurgha, Gulmi =

Coordinates: 28°9′N 83°18′E

Kurgha कुर्घा
- Village Development Committee
- Interactive map of Kurgha
- Country: Nepal
- Zone: Lumbini Zone
- District: Gulmi District

Population (1991)
  - Total: 2,988
- Time zone: UTC+5:45 (Nepal Time)

Kurgha is a village and municipality in Gulmi District in the Lumbini Zone of central Nepal. At the time of the 1991 Nepal census it had a population of 2988 persons residing in 556 individual households.
