= Badagaun, Gulmi =

Coordinates: 28°8′N 83°18′E

Badagaun बडागाउँ
- Village Development Committee
- Interactive map of Badagaun
- Country: Nepal
- Zone: Lumbini Zone
- District: Gulmi District

Population (1991)
  - Total: 7,249
- Time zone: UTC+5:45 (Nepal Time)

Badagaun is a town and municipality in Gulmi District in the Lumbini Zone of central Nepal. At the time of the 1991 Nepal census it had a population of 7247 persons residing in 1305 individual households.
