= Gaudakot, Gulmi =

Gaundakot गौंडाकोट
- Village Development Committee
- Location in Nepal
- Coordinates: 28.04°N 83.31°E
- Nepal: Nepal
- Zone: Lumbini Zone
- District: Gulmi District

Population (2011)
  - Total: 2,563
- Time zone: UTC+5:45 (Nepal Time)

Gaundakot is a village and municipality in Gulmi District in the Lumbini Zone of central Nepal. At the time of the 2011 Nepal census it had a population of 2,563 persons living in 643 individual households.
