= Gulmi District =

Coordinates: 28°4′N 83°15′E

Gulmi District गुल्मी
- District
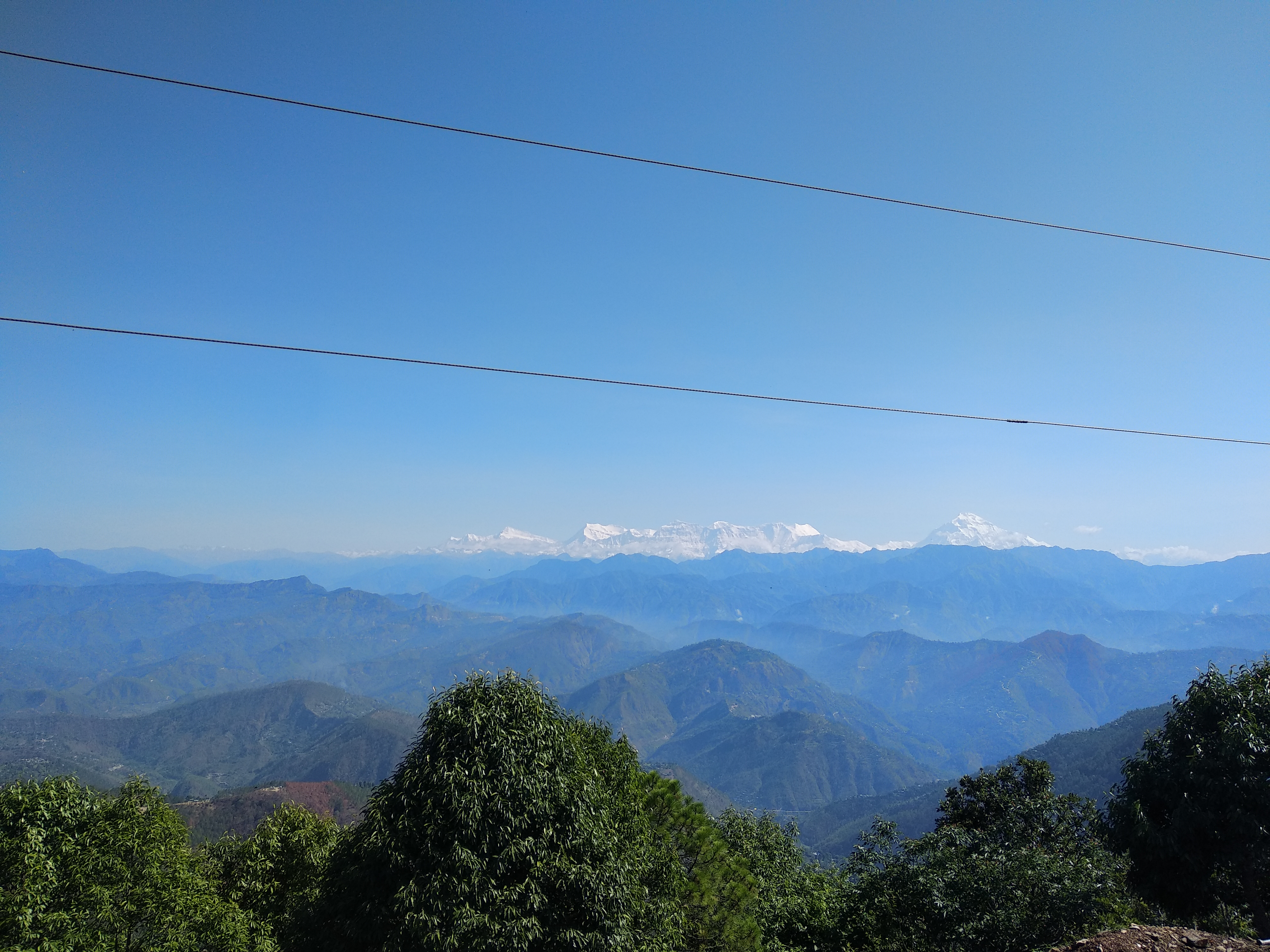
- View of High Himalayas from Gulmi district

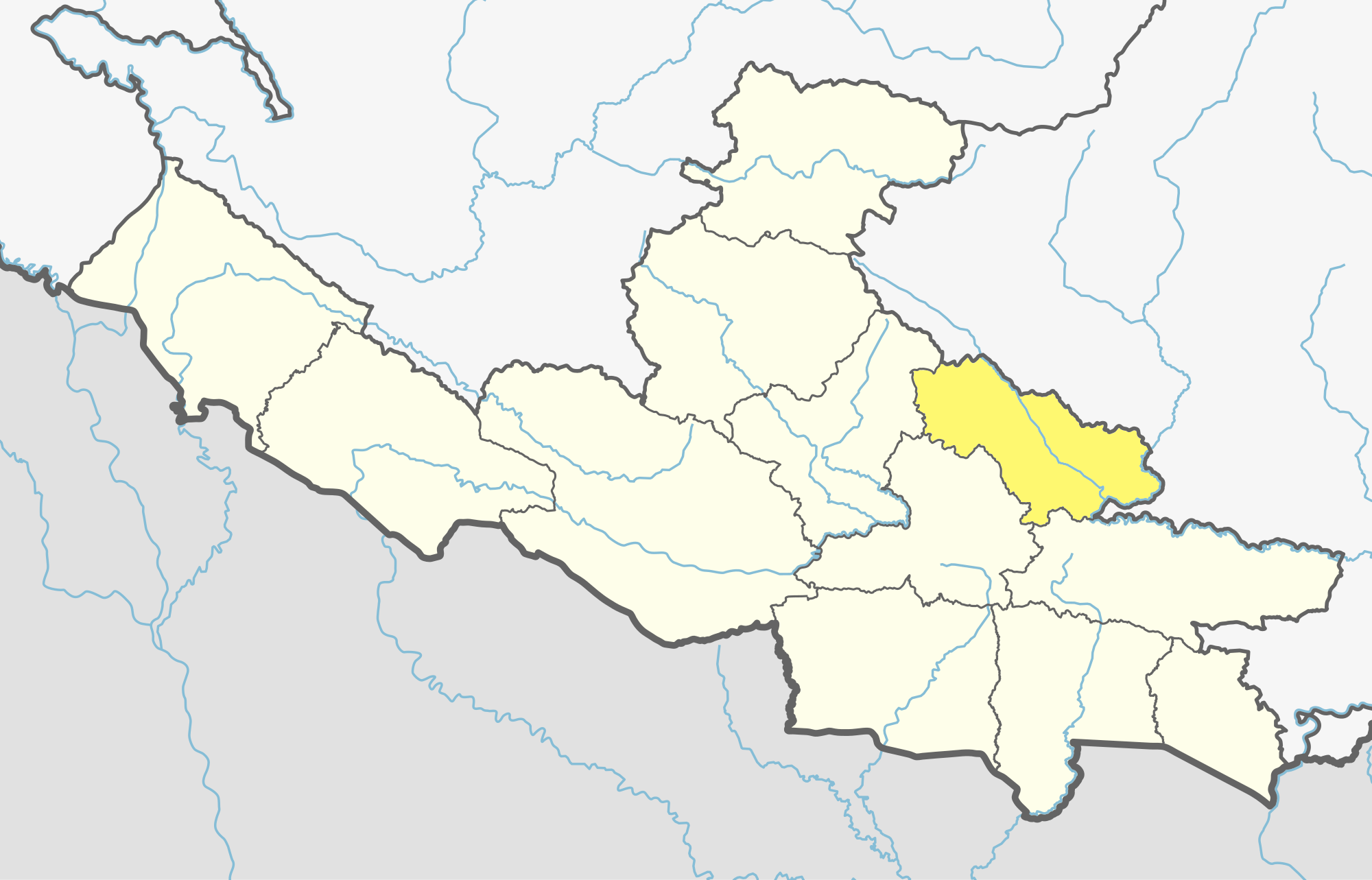
- Location of Gulmi (dark yellow) in Lumbini Province
- Country: Nepal
- Province: Lumbini Province
- Admin HQ.: Tamghas

Government
  - Type: Coordination committee
  - Body: DCC, Gulmi

Area
  - Total: 1,149 km^{2} (444 sq mi)

Population (2021)
  - Total: 246,836
  - Density: 214.8/km^{2} (556.4/sq mi)
- Time zone: UTC+05:45 (NPT)
- Postal Codes: 32600
- Telephone Code: 079
- Main Language(s): Nepali
- Website: ddcgulmi.gov.np

Gulmi District (Nepali: गुल्मी जिल्ला), a part of Lumbini Province, is one of the seventy-seven districts of Nepal. The district, with Tamghas as its headquarters, covers an area of 1,149 km^{2} (444 sq mi), had a population of 296,654 in 2001, 280,160 in 2011 and 268,597 in 2016.

== Introduction ==
Gulmi is a hilly district that lies in Lumbini Province. Surrounded by Syangja and Parbat districts on the east, Palpa, and Arghakhanchi on the south, Baglung on the north, and Pyuthan on the west. Gulmi is widely known for introducing coffee farming to Nepal. It is also a major exporter of organic coffee. Gulmi is rich in natural resources such as cobalt. Festivals such as Maghe Sankranti and other festivals are popular among both tourists and locals.

The major destination with huge potential for tourism includes Bichitra Cave in Dhurkot, historical Kingdom of Dhurkot durbar is located. Resunga, with its rich biodiversity and religious value, Gyawa Kshetra, Charpala, Musikot, Isma Durbar, Wami Taksar, and Purtighat. Ruru (also known as Ridi). The district is also famous for orange farming. Dhurkot rural municipality is a major hub for orange farming. More than 10 Crore worth of orange is sold annually which includes export to India. The district headquarter is Tamghas, a hill town situated between Resunga and Arjun. Currently, there are ten rural municipalities and two municipalities Resunga and Musikot.

== Divisions ==
Gulmi district is divided into total 12 Local level bodies in which two are municipality and ten are rural municipalities as below:

Municipalities

- Musikot
- Resunga

Rural municipalities

- Ishma
- Kaligandaki
- Gulmi Darbar
- Satyawati
- Chandrakot
- Rurukshetra
- Chhatrakot
- Dhurkot
- Madane
- Malika

== Communications ==
There are 76 post offices in the district including one main district post office and 14 area police offices. There are nine telecenters, 11 FM radio stations, and eight cable TV networks. According to Nepal Telecom, there were 82,318 GSM mobile subscribers in the district as of 2015.

== Geography and climate ==
according to climatic zones
Climate Zone	Elevation Range	% of Area
Upper Tropical	300 to 1,000 meters 1,000 to 3,300 ft.	23.5%
Subtropical	1,000 to 2,000 meters 3,300 to 6,600 ft.	71.9%
Temperate	2,000 to 3,000 meters 6,400 to 9,800 ft.	4.6%

== Demographics ==
Historical population
Census year	Pop.	±% p.a.
1981	238,113	—
1991	266,331	+1.13%
2001	296,654	+1.08%
2011	280,160	−0.57%
2021	246,494	−1.27%
Source: Citypopulation

At the time of the 2021 Nepal census, Gulmi District had a population of 246,494. 8.04% of the population is under 5 years of age. It has a literacy rate of 80.34% and a sex ratio of 1200 females per 1000 males. 108,375 (61.20%) lived in municipalities..

Castes/ethnic groups in Gulmi district (2021)
1. Chhetri (22.8%)
2. Magar (22.3%)
3. Bahun (21.4%)
4. Kami (13.4%)
5. Sarki (5.38%)
6. Damai (3.79%)
7. Kumal (3.63%)
8. Newar (1.75%)
9. Dasnmai (1.33%)
10. Thakuri (1.01%)
11. Bhujel (0.98%)
12. Other Hill Janjati (1.55%)
13. Others (0.71%)

Khas people are the largest group, making up 69% of the population. Hill Janjatis, mainly Magars, make up 28% of the population. Newars are 2% of the population.

Languages of Gulmi district (2021)
1. Nepali (95.3%)
2. Magar (2.59%)
3. Others (2.08%)

At the time of the 2021 census, 95.33% of the population spoke Nepali and 2.59% Magar as their first language. In 2011, 96.2% of the population spoke Nepali as their first language.

Religion in Gulmi District (2021)
Religion	Percent
Hinduism	96.58%
Buddhism	2.15%
Prakriti	0.60%
Other or not stated	0.67%
