= Pithauli =

Pithauli पिठौली
- Location in Nepal
- Coordinates: 27.65°N 84.16°E
- Country: Nepal
- Zone: Lumbini Zone
- District: Nawalparasi District

Population (1991)
  - Total: 5,957
- Time zone: UTC+5:45 (Nepal Time)

Pithauli is a town in Kawaswati Municipality in Nawalparasi District in the Lumbini Zone of southern Nepal. The municipality was formed by merging the existing Kawaswati, Shivamandir, Pithauli, Agryouli VDCs. At the time of the 1991 Nepal census it had a population of 5957 people living in 1084 individual households.
