= Kawaswati =

Coordinates: 27°37′N 84°8′E

Kawasoti कावासोती नगरपालिका
- Municipality
- Nickname: kawasoti
- Interactive map of Kawasoti
- nepal: Nepal
- Zone: Lumbini Zone
- District: Nawalparasi District

Population (1991)
  - Total: 6,551
- Time zone: UTC+5:45 (Nepal Time)

Kawasoti is a Municipality in Nawalparasi District in the Lumbini Zone of southern Nepal. The municipality was formed by merging the existing Kawasoti, Shivamandir, Pithauli, Agryouli VDCs. At the time of the 1991 Nepal census it had a population of 6,886 people living in 1,169 individual households.
