= Agryouli =

Place in Nepal

- Location in Nepal Agryouli (Nepal)
- Coordinates: 27.60°N 84.10°E
- Country: Nepal
- Zone: Lumbini Zone
- District: Nawalparasi District

Population (1991)
  - Total: 8,820
- Time zone: UTC+5:45 (Nepal Time)

Agyauli is a town in Kawasoti Municipality in Nawalparasi District in the Lumbini Zone of southern Nepal. The municipality was formed by merging the existing Kawaswati, Shivamandir, Pithauli, Agryouli VDCs. At the time of the 1991 Nepal census it had a population of 8820 people living in 1398 individual households.
