= Shivamandir =

Coordinates: 27°40′N 84°8′E

Shivamandir शिवमन्दिर
- Interactive map of Shivamandir
- Country: Nepal
- Zone: Lumbini Zone
- District: Nawalparasi District

Population (1991)
  - Total: 12,948
- Time zone: UTC+5:45 (Nepal Time)

Shivamandir is a town in Kawaswati Municipality in Nawalparasi District in the Lumbini Zone of southern Nepal. The municipality was formed by merging the existing Kawaswati, Shivamandir, Pithauli, Agryouli VDCs. At the time of the 1991 Nepal census it had a population of 12,948 people living in 2362 individual households.
