= Lumbini province =

Province of Nepal

Lumbini Province लुम्बिनी प्रदेश
- Province
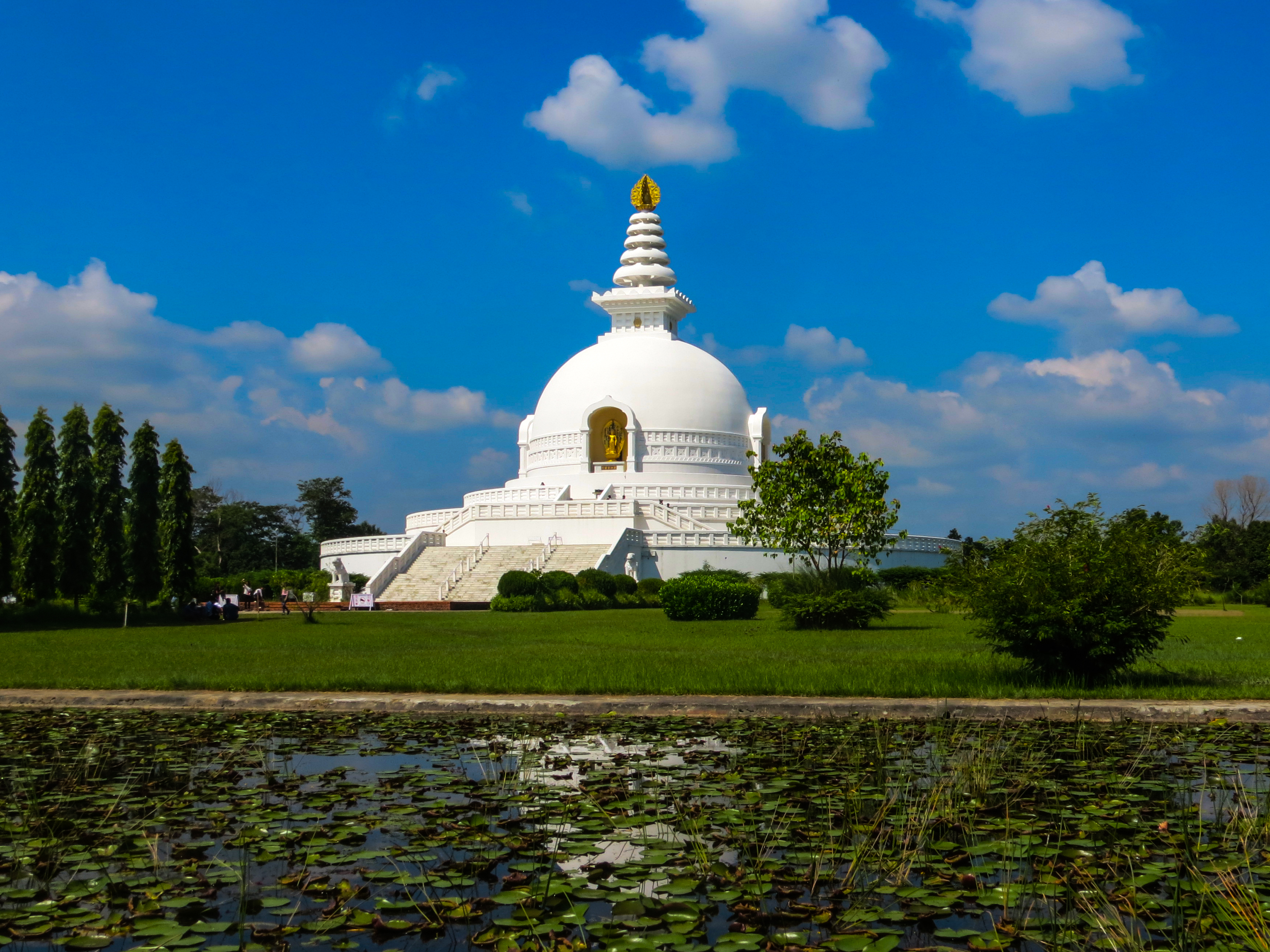
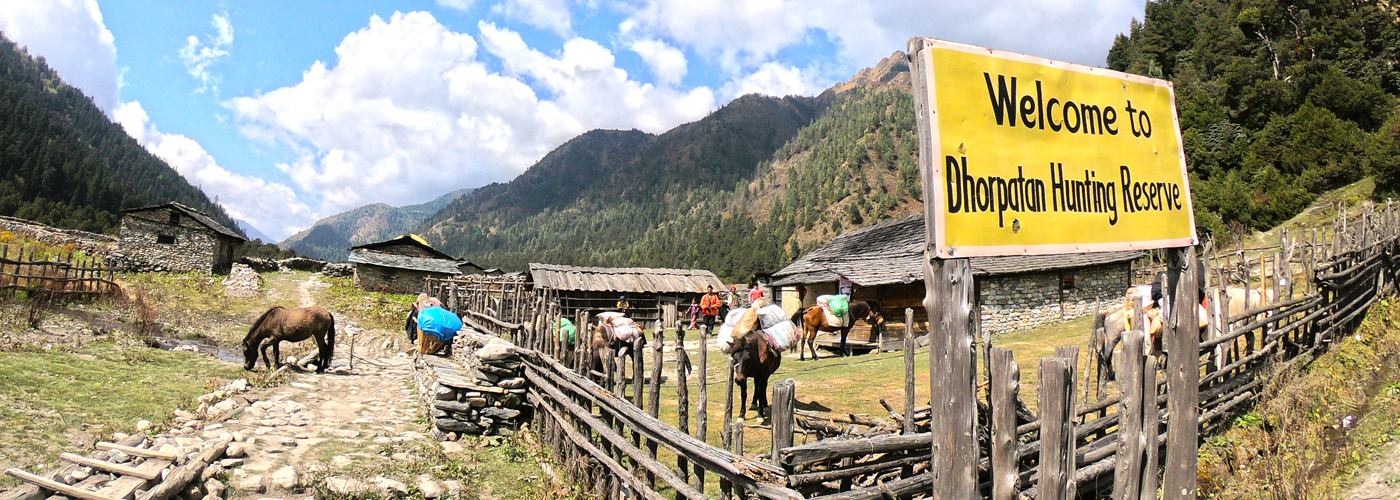
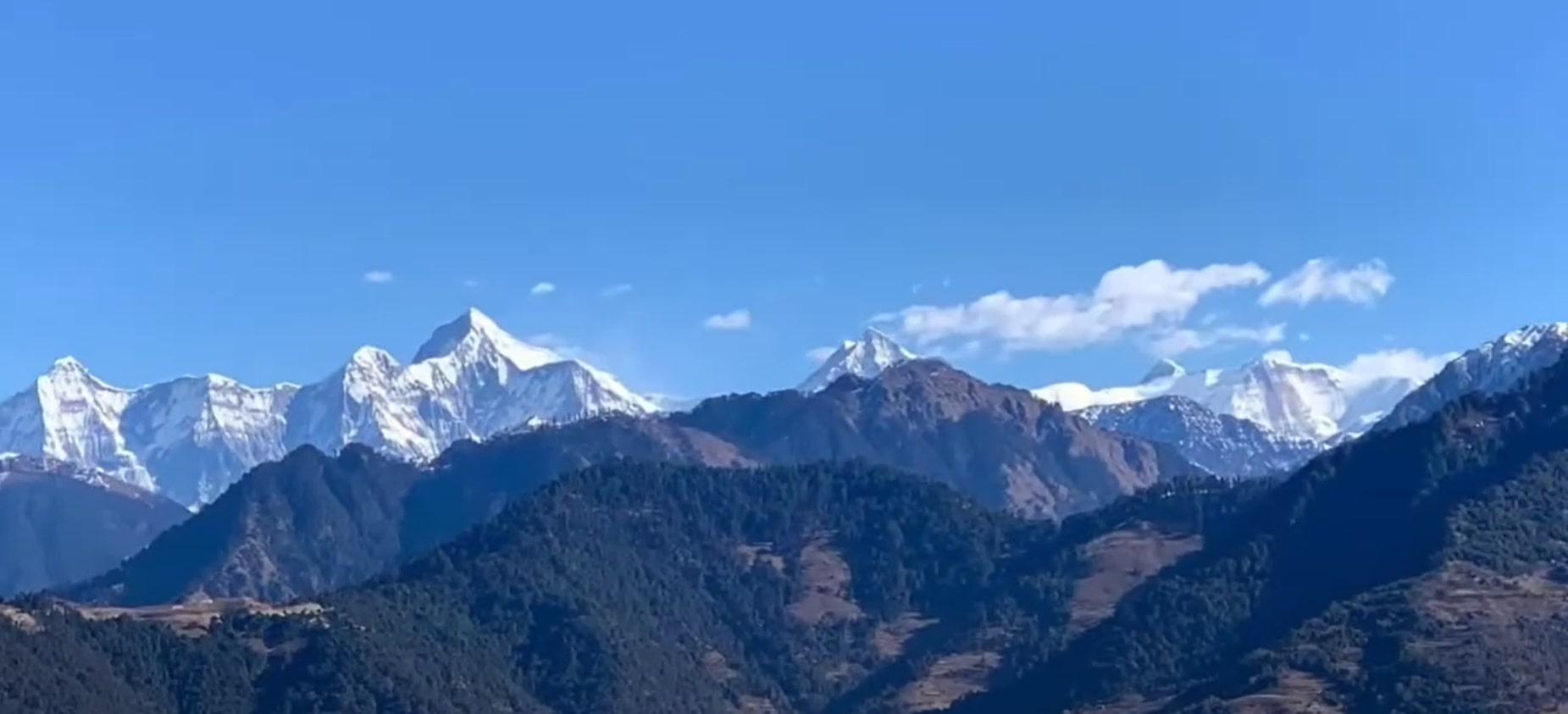
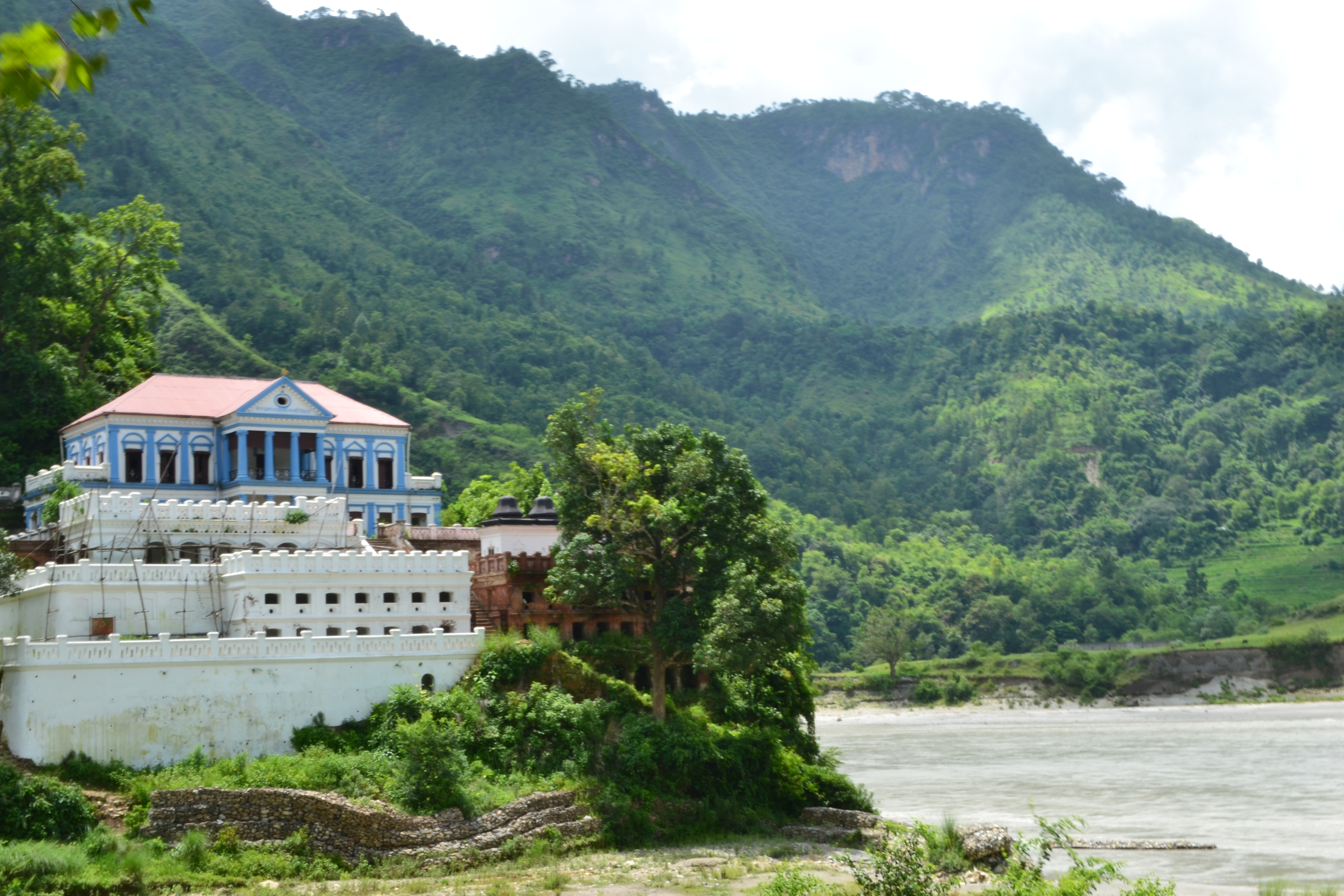
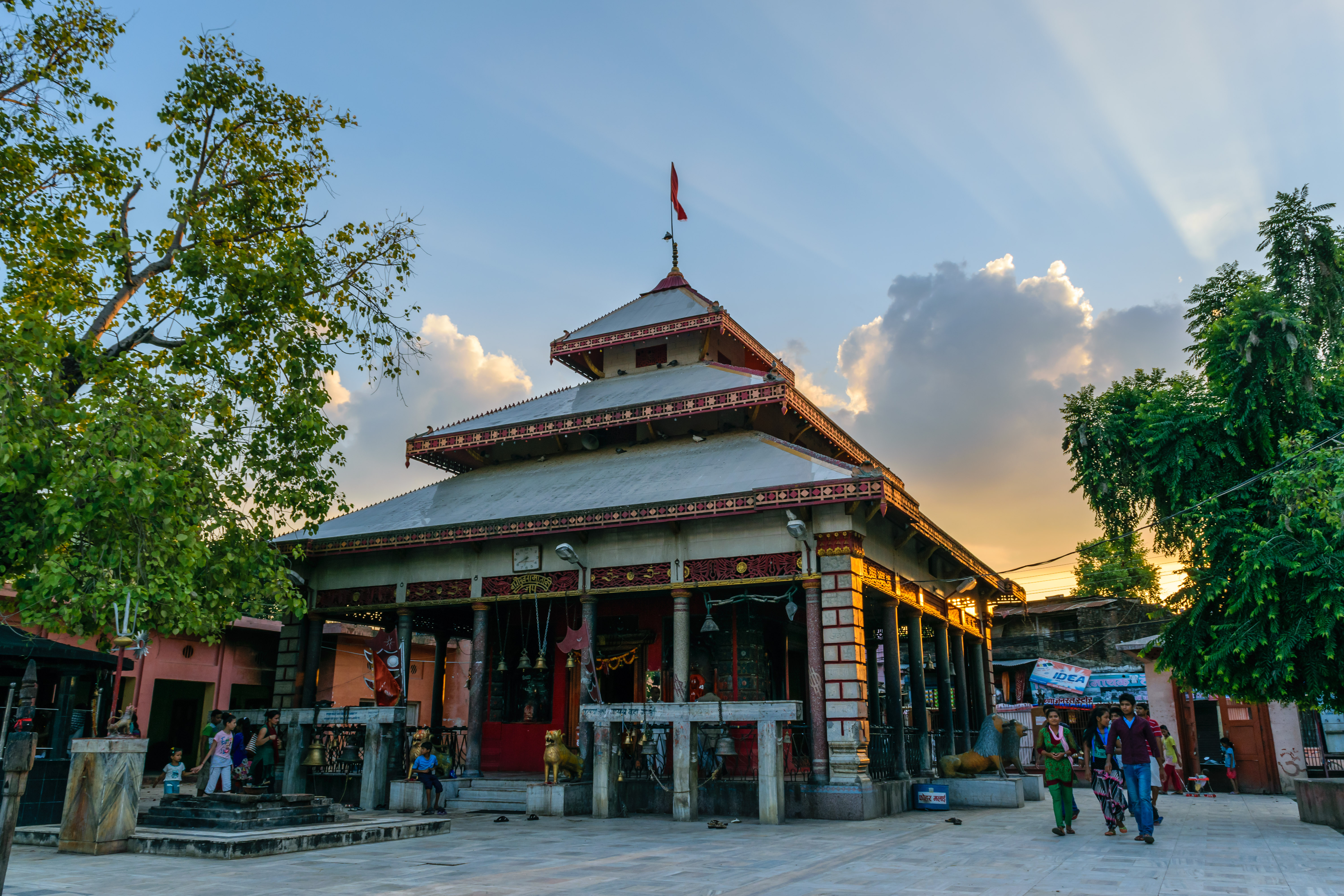
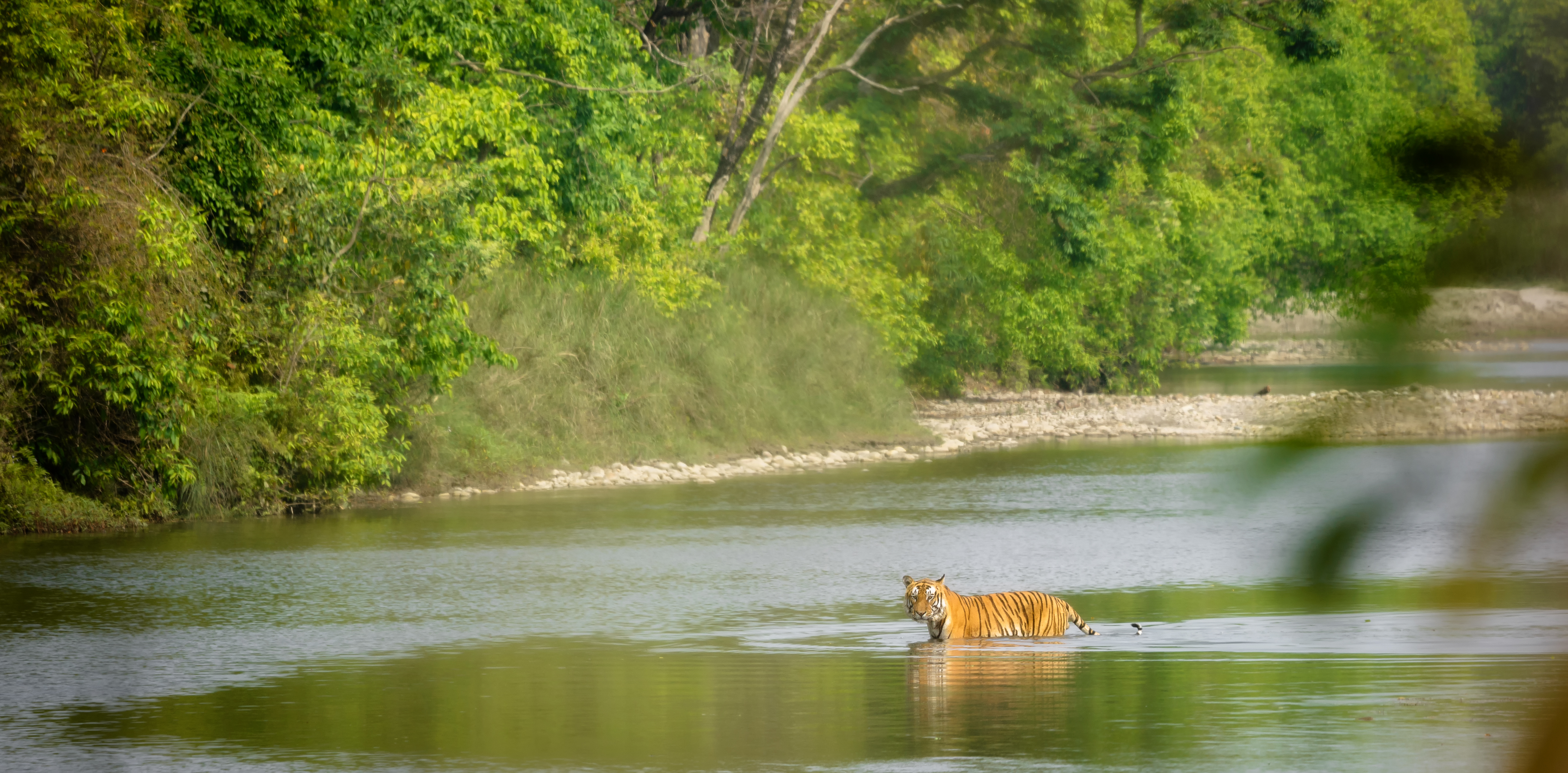
- From Top left to right World Peace Pagoda in Lumbini, Dhorpatan Hunting Reserve, Dhaulagiri Himalayas in Eastern Rukum, Ranighat Palace in Palpa, Bageshwori Temple and a Bengal tiger at Bardiya National Park

- Seal

- Location of Lumbini Province

- Divisions of Lumbini
- Coordinates: 27°39′33.13″N 83°26′18.3″E
- Country: Nepal
- Formation: 20 September 2015
- Capital: Deukhuri
- Largest City: Butwal
- Districts: 12

Government
  - Type: Self governing province
  - Body: Government of Lumbini Pradesh
  - Governor: Krishna Bahadur Gharti
  - Chief Minister: Chet Narayan Acharya
  - High Court: Tulsipur High Court
  - Provincial Assembly: Unicameral (87 seats)
  - Parliamentary constituency: 26

Area
  - Total: 22,288 km^{2} (8,605 sq mi)
  - Rank: 3rd
- Highest elevation (Putha Hiunchuli): 7,246 m (23,773 ft)
- Lowest elevation (Rupandehi): 90 m (300 ft)

Population (2021)
  - Total: 5,124,225
  - Rank: 3rd
  - Density: 229.91/km^{2} (595.46/sq mi)
  - Rank: 3rd
- Time zone: UTC+5:45 (NST)
- Geocode: NP-FI
- Official language: Nepali (51.6%)
- Other Official language(s): 1. Tharu (Dangaura); 2. Awadhi; 3. Magar; 4. Bhojpuri
- HDI: ▲0.563 (medium)
- Literacy: ▲80.1% (2024)
- Sex ratio: 90.43 ♂ /100 ♀ (2011)
- GDP: 7.0 billion USD
- GDP rank: 3rd
- Website: http://ocmcm.p5.gov.np/

Lumbini Province (Nepali: लुम्बिनी प्रदेश, romanized: Lumbinī pradēśa, IPA: [lumbiniː]) is a province in western Nepal. The country's third largest province in terms of area as well as population, Lumbini is home to the World Heritage Site of Lumbini, where according to Buddhist tradition Gautama Buddha, the founder of Buddhism, was born.

Lumbini borders Gandaki Province and Karnali Province to the north, Sudurpashchim Province to the west, and Uttar Pradesh and Bihar of India to the south. Lumbini's capital, Deukhuri, is near the geographic center of the province. The major cities in the province are Butwal and Siddharthanagar in Rupandehi district, Nepalgunj in Banke district, Tansen in Palpa district, and Ghorahi and Tulsipur in Dang district.

== Capital ==
The Provincial Assembly adopted Lumbini Province as the permanent name by replacing its initial name Province No. 5 on 6 October 2020 and Deukhuri was declared the provincial capital.

== History ==
=== Pre-history ===
The Churiya range linked with the Dang valley of Lumbini province has been archaeologically considered very ancient with the existence of Sivapithecus, a link between man and ape. The pre-historic studies of the valley have been carried out extensively since the last century; by Tribhuvan University since 1966, American Museum of Natural History and the Department of Mines of then His Majesty's Government of Nepal from 1976, as well as the Paleolithic study of Dang valley by University of Erlangen-Nuremberg of Germany in 1984, among others. These researches have pointed out that Dang valley was a lake approximately 2.5 to 1 million years ago.

=== Shakya-era ===
As per the Buddhist tradition, Queen Maya Devi of Kapilavastu was traveling to her father's Koliya kingdom in Devdaha to give birth to her child as was the Shakya tradition. However, on the way she stopped near the garden of Lumbini to rest and went into labour thus giving birth to the future Buddha under a sal tree. Gautama Buddha was born in 623 BC in Lumbini, testified by the inscription on the pillar erected by the Mauryan Emperor Ashoka in 249 BC which marks the spot as the birthplace of Buddha Shakyamuni. The inscription mentions, as translated by Paranavitana:

When King Devanampriya Priyadarsin had been anointed twenty years, he came himself and worshipped (this spot) because the Buddha Shakyamuni was born here. (He) both caused to be made a stone bearing a horse and caused a stone pillar to be set up, (in order to show) that the Blessed One was born here. (He) made the village of Lumbini free of taxes, and paying (only) an eighth share (of the produce).

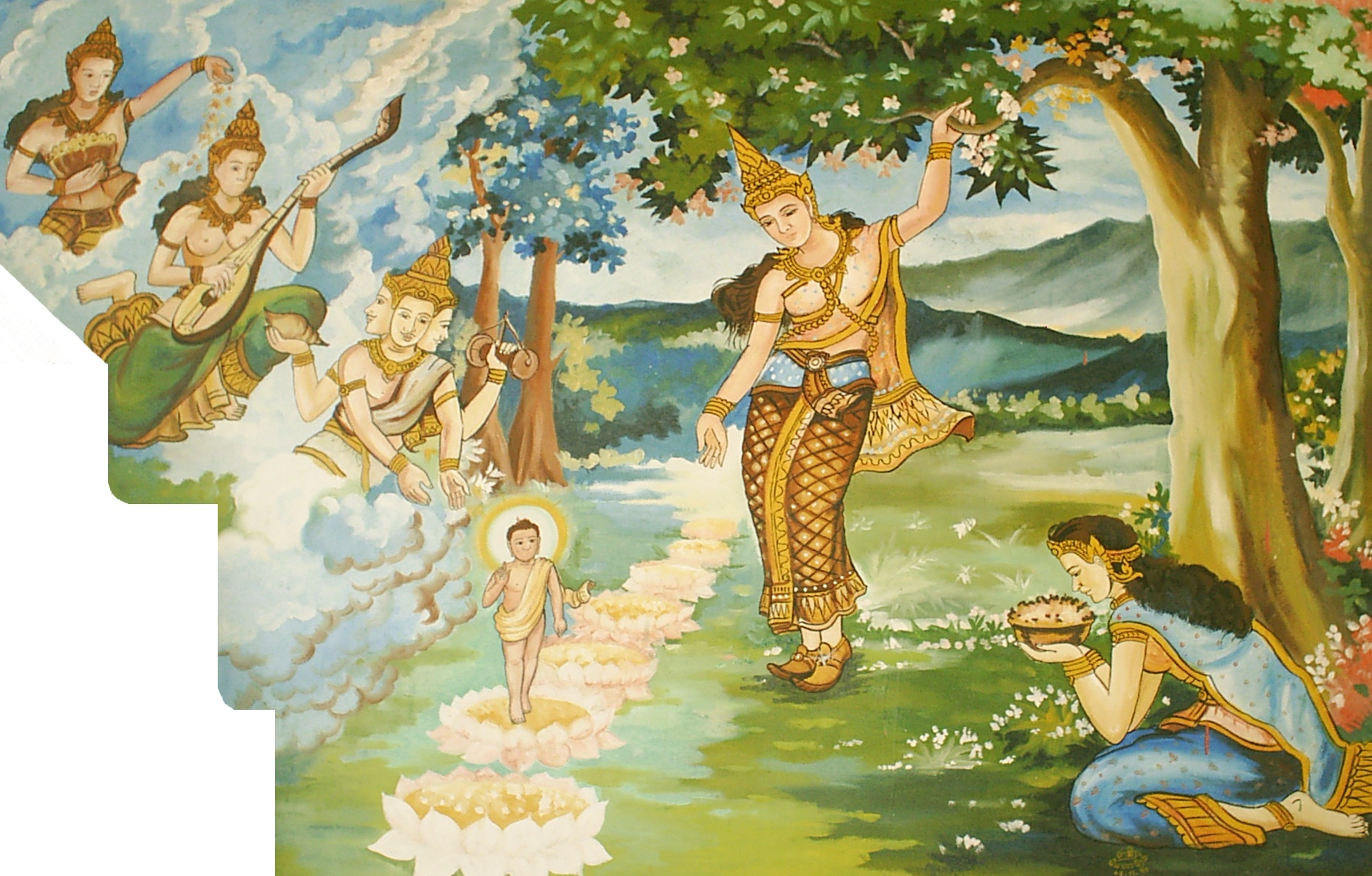
Gautama Buddha's s birth in Lumbini (His mother Maya Devi depicted holding a branch of sal tree)

According to the Buddhist texts, Gautama Buddha was born as a prince in a royal Shakya clan reigning over the kingdom of Kapilavastu. This ancient city has been widely identified as Tilaurakot of present Kapilvastu district where ruins of the ancient fortified city have been found. Gautama was a prince of Kapilavastu until the age of 29, after which he left the palace behind and wandered throughout the Ganges plain as an ascetic – learning yoga and related concepts from various teachers.

After the death of Gautama Buddha, eight princes out of sixteen mahājanapadās received Buddha's relics, one of them a Koliyan king of Rāmagrāma (present Parasi district) who built a stupa enshrining the relic. Buddhist texts point out the princes constructed a stupa at or near their capital city and enshrined Buddha's relics. The site has the only undisturbed original stupa containing the relic of Gautama Buddha in the world, and was added to the World Heritage Tentative List by UNESCO on 23 May 1996.

=== Reign of Ashoka the Great ===
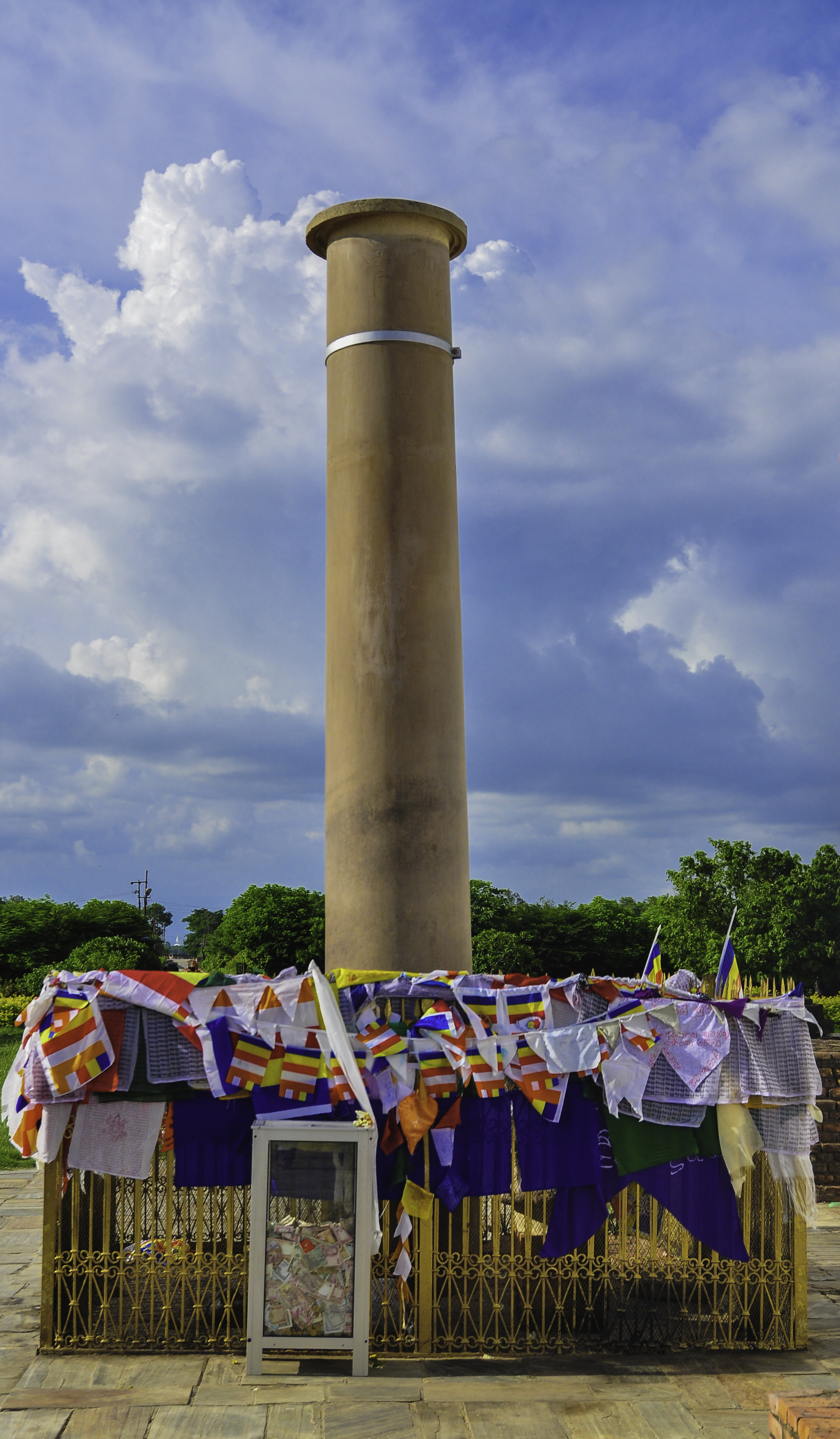
Ashoka pillar of Lumbini

Emperor Ashoka The Great, having converted to Buddhism after being victorious in brutal wars, devoted himself to the spread of Buddha's teachings and erected monolithic columns known as Pillars of Ashoka at sites associated with the life of Gautama Buddha. One such pillar was erected by Ashoka in Lumbini in 249 BC, commemorating the sacred site of Gautama Buddha's birth and declared the village free of taxation.

In dedication to the two Buddhas of the past, Ashoka also set up a stone pillar and enlarged the stupa marking the birthplace of Buddha Kanakamuni at Nigali Sagar in Kapilvastu District. Another pillar, also in Kapilvastu District, was erected commemorating Kakusandha Buddha.

=== Medieval Period ===
During the medieval period after the 11th century, Khasa Kingdom dominated much of western Nepal and western Tibet which was initially oriented towards Buddhism and Shamanism, and at their peak encompassed Guge and Purang of Tibet and western Nepal up to Kaskikot. King Ripumalla, one of the initial Khasa rulers, left an inscription on the Ashoka pillar with six-syllable mantra of Buddhism and his wish "Om mani padme hum: May Prince Ripu Malla be long victorious", dated around 1312 CE.

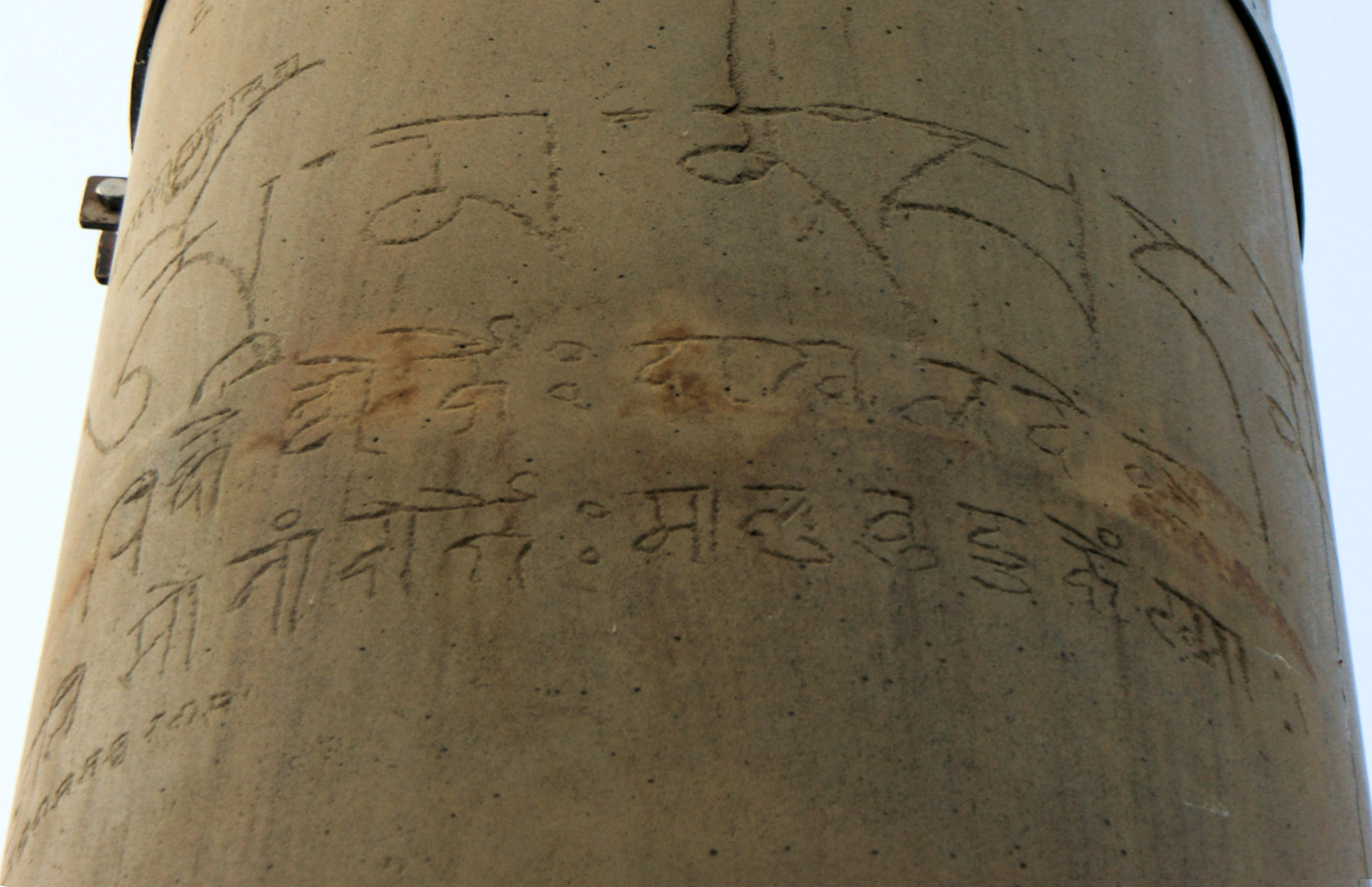
The Lumbini pillar inscription of Khas King Ripu Malla: "Om mani padme hum, May Prince Ripu Malla be long victorious."(1312 CE)

After the late 13th century, Khasa kingdom disintegrated into numerous principalities each with its own ruler. In the 18th century, King Prithvi Narayan Shah, born from the marriage of king Nara Bhupal Shah of the Gorkha Kingdom and Queen Kaushalyavati Devi, the princess of the Palpa kingdom; set out on a conquest to unify the region into modern Nepal.

=== Modern history ===
==== Anglo-Nepalese War ====
The Anglo-Nepalese War (1814–1816) took place between the Gorkhali army of the Kingdom of Nepal and the British forces of the East India Company for two years leading to the Sugauli Treaty in 1816 which demarcated the boundary of the Kingdom of Nepal. Among the prominent battles during the Anglo-Nepalese War, the Battle of Jitgadhi - fought in January 1815 and again in April 1815 - was marked by the victory of the Gorkhali army. The Nepalese Colonel Ujir Singh Thapa, who led the kingdom of Nepal to victory in this battle, is revered as one of the national heroes in the military history of Nepal.

Battle of Jit Gadhi

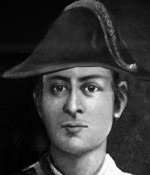
Colonel Ujir Singh Thapa stood victorious against the English troops

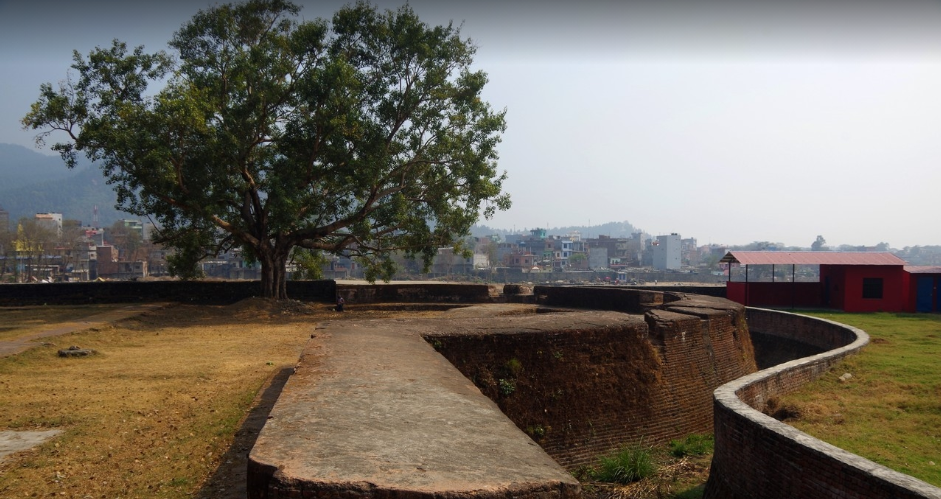
Jit Gadhi fort - used by the victorious Nepalese troops in the battle against the British East India Company (1815 AD)

After the Kingdom of Nepal outright refused the proposal of British East India Company which wanted to claim its sovereignty in the territories of Butwal and Sheoraj, General John Sullivan Wood of the East India Company led an offensive column to the fort of Jit Gadhi in January 1815 AD. The frontier fort, which was surrounded by dense forest and situated on the west bank of the river Tinau on a primary route to Tansen, was being held by Nepalese Colonel Ujir Singh Thapa - the nephew of Nepalese Prime Minister Mukhtiyar Bhimsen Thapa.

Although low in number and acutely inferior in firepower, the strong resistance put forward by Colonel Ujir Singh Thapa thwarted the incursion of the British forces into Nepal twice in January 1815 and April 1815. The battle established Colonel Thapa as a national military hero and forced the English troops to withdraw.

==== Historical Districts ====
During the Rana regime, the region was politically divided into administrative districts Butwal, Palpa, Deukhuri, Sallyana, Banke, Bardiya and Pyuthan.

== Geography ==
Lumbini, with an area of 22,288 square kilometers (8,605.44 sq. mi) covers about 15.1% of the country's total area. Lumbini Province is almost the size of US state of New Jersey. The province extends 150 km (93 mi) north to south and about 300 km (186 mi) east to west at its maximum width. It shares 413.14 km (256 mi) of border with India (states of Bihar and Uttar Pradesh).

The Province is geographically bordered with Gandaki Province to the east and north, by Karnali province to the north and west, by Sudurpaschim Province to the west and by India to the south. There are three ecological regions of Mountains, Hills and Terai; each occupying 3.1%, 69.3% and 27.6% of the province respectively.

Land Utilization in Lumbini
1. Forest (45.0%)
2. Agriculture (29.0%)
3. Housing (14.0%)
4. Grassland (5.00%)
5. Barren vegetation (5.00%)
6. Water (1.00%)
7. Others (1.00%)

Ecological regions of Lumbini Province
Ecological regions	Percentage of territory
Mountains	3.1%
Hills	69.3%
Terai (plain)	27.6%

=== Climate ===
Lumbini has a humid subtropical climate and experiences four seasons. The winter in January and February is followed by summer between March and May and the monsoon season between June and September. In winter, it's sunny and mild, pleasantly warm during the day but cool at night, sometimes even cold. The average temperature in January is around 15 °C (59 °F). But the northern parts of the province get colder and can experience snowfall. By March, the temperature rises considerably and it begins to be hot, while from April to June it's scorching hot, and highs can reach or exceed 40 °C (104 °F) in southern plains.

In June, the summer monsoon arrives, characterized by heavy rains, in the form of downpours and thunderstorms. The monsoon arrives first in the east, in early June, while in the west it comes in the middle of the month or so. The temperature decreases, with the maximum dropping to around 32 °C (90 °F) in July and August, but the humidity increases, making the heat muggy. The rains are heavy, especially in July and August, when they exceed 300 millimeters (12 inches) per month, but in certain areas at the foot of the mountains, they can exceed 600 mm (23.5 in) per month. The monsoon starts to withdraw by early October in the west, and about a week later in the east. The weather returns to be sunny, and even though October is still a hot month, the humidity decreases, and the night temperature becomes a bit cooler.

Average temperatures and precipitation for selected communities in Lumbini
Location	August (°F)	August (°C)	January (°F)	January (°C)	Annual Precipitation (mm/in)
Butwal	79	26.1	55.6	13.1	1827.2/71.9
Gulariya	84.4	29.1	59.4	15.2	1503.7/59.2
Nepalgunj	84.4	29.1	59.5	15.3	1302.1/51.3
Siddharthanagar	79.7	29	55.4	15.9	1762.7/69.4
Sitganga	75.6	24.2	51.8	11	1633.2/64.3
Tansen	76.8	24.9	53.4	11.9	1949.3/76.7
Tulsipur	79.7	26.5	55.4	13	1495.4/58.9

=== Valleys ===
==== Dang-Deukhuri ====
Dang and Deukhuri valleys, 10 km apart, are located in the Dang Deukhuri District. The Dang Valley lies between the Mahabharat Range in the north and the Churia Range in the south. It forms a nearly 1,000 km^{2} (390 sq mi) plain within a local drainage basin of less than 3,000 km^{2} (1,200 sq mi). It is drained by the Babai River, and is one of the largest Inner Terai valleys. Deukhuri Valley is southeast of the Dang Valley and extends about 60 km (37 mi) in WNW-ESE direction with a maximum width of 20 km (12 mi), and is surrounded by Sivalik Hills on all sides. It forms a nearly 600 km^{2} (230 sq mi) plain within a drainage basin of 6,100 km^{2} (2,400 sq mi). The valley is drained by the West Rapti River.

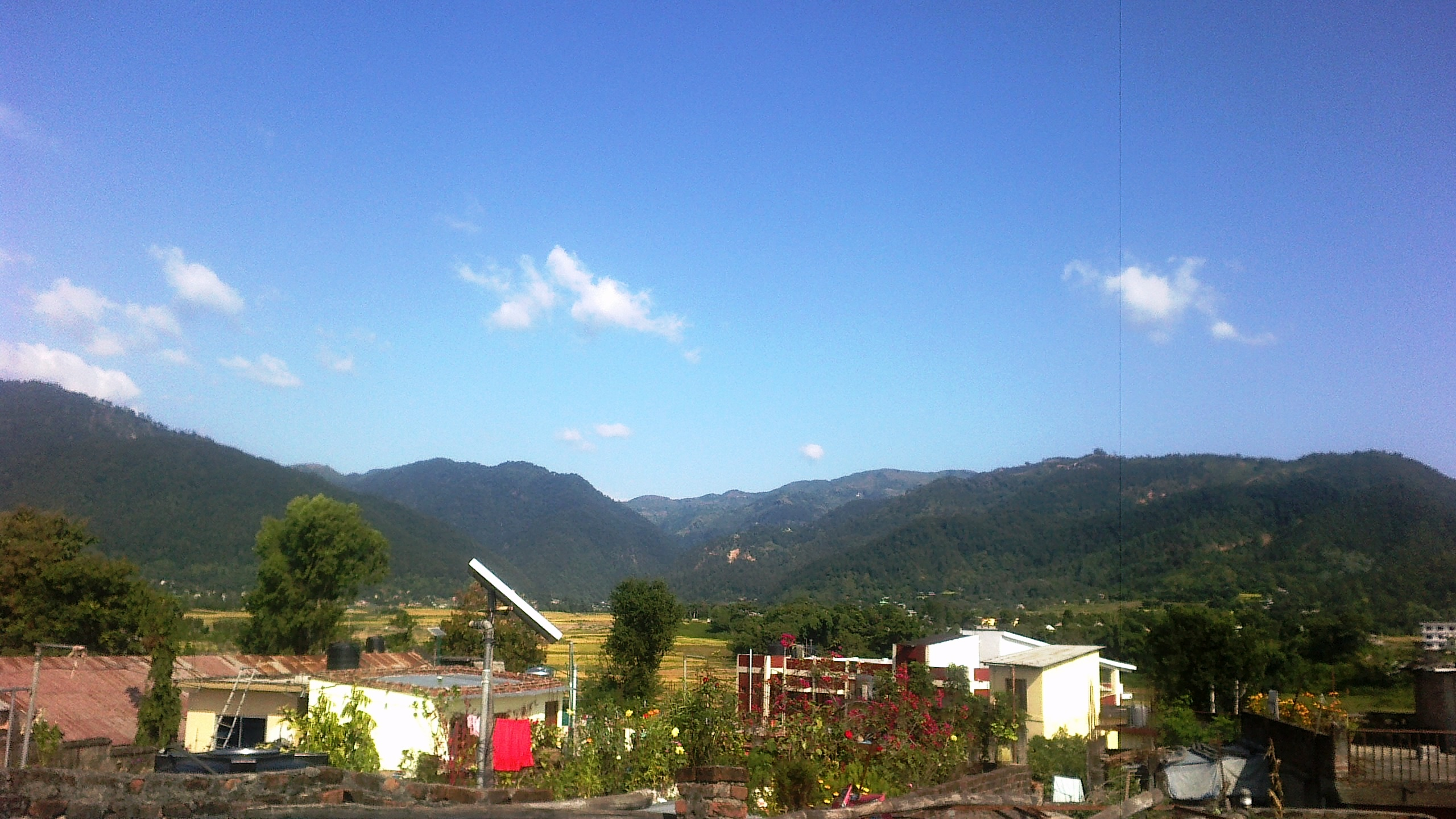
Dang valley is one of the largest Inner Terai valleys of Nepal

The elevations of Dang and Deukhuri valleys are 700 meters and 300 meters from sea level respectively. Late Cenozoic sedimentary sequences are well exposed along the southern part of Dang and all sides of Deukhuri valley, and mostly consist of deformed rocks resulting from the persistence of shortening between Indian Plate and Eurasian Plate. The two valleys have been considered a vital location of Paleolithic archeology in South Asia due to the abundant presence of ancient Paleolithic tool sites.

Other small valleys of the province are located in districts like Arghakhanchi (Rapti), Palpa (Rampur), Gulmi (Simaltari), Pyuthan (Darban and Bajipur).

=== Forests ===
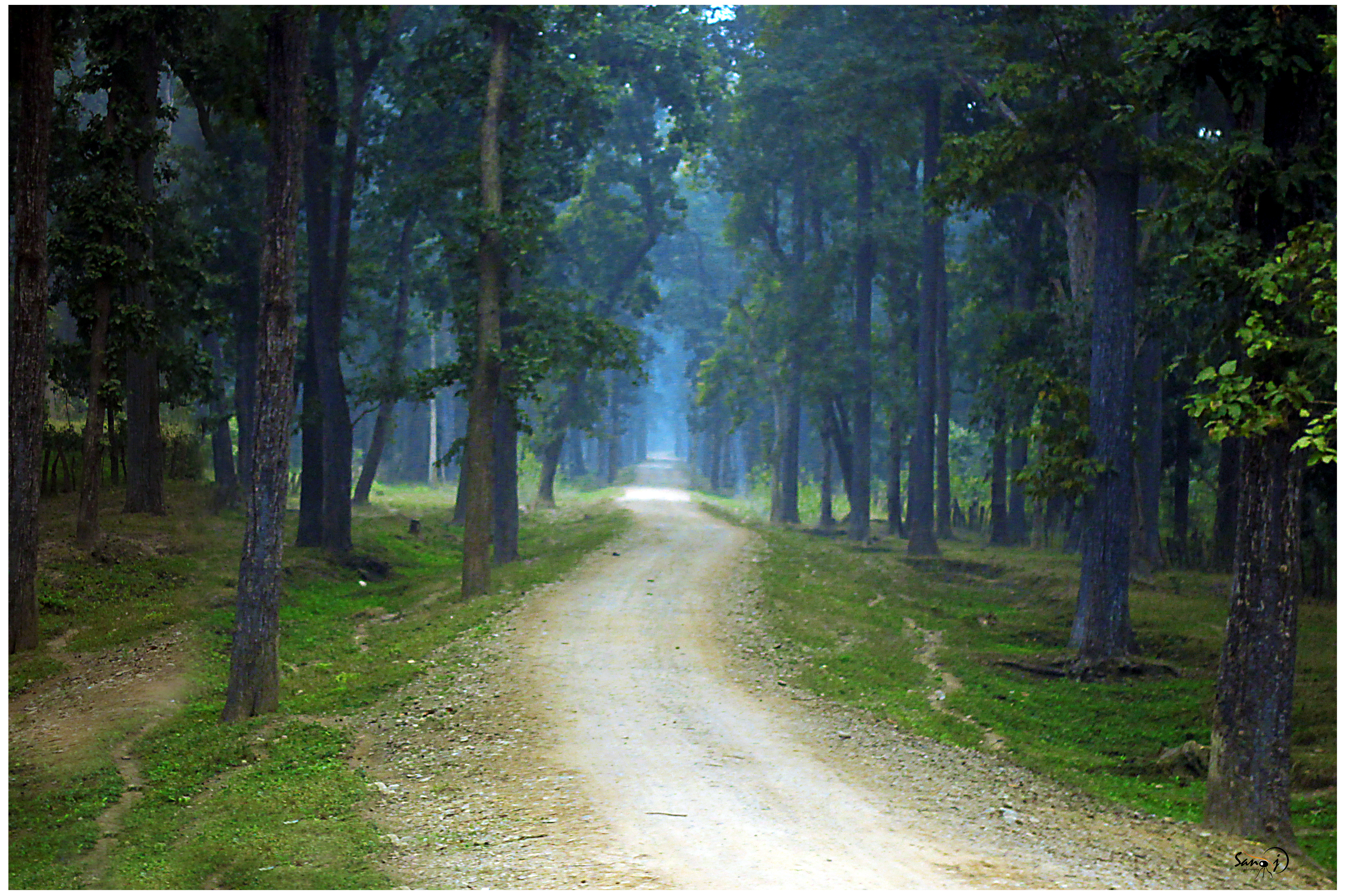
Forest zone in Bardiya district

About 15% of the total land is covered in protected forest in the province.

Forest area by districts in the province.
Districts	Forest (%)	Area (ha.th.)
Arghakhanchi	59.69	73.96
Banke	62.70	117.91
Bardiya	56.82	113.69
Dang	65.60	200.72
Gulmi	41.83	46.34
Kapilvastu	36.92	60.97
Parasi	81.30	22
Palpa	56.62	82.77
Pyuthan	48.95	64.67
Rolpa	52.82	99.60
Rukum	39.39	66.25
Rupandehi	19.54	25.51
Total	50.43	974.38

=== Mountains ===
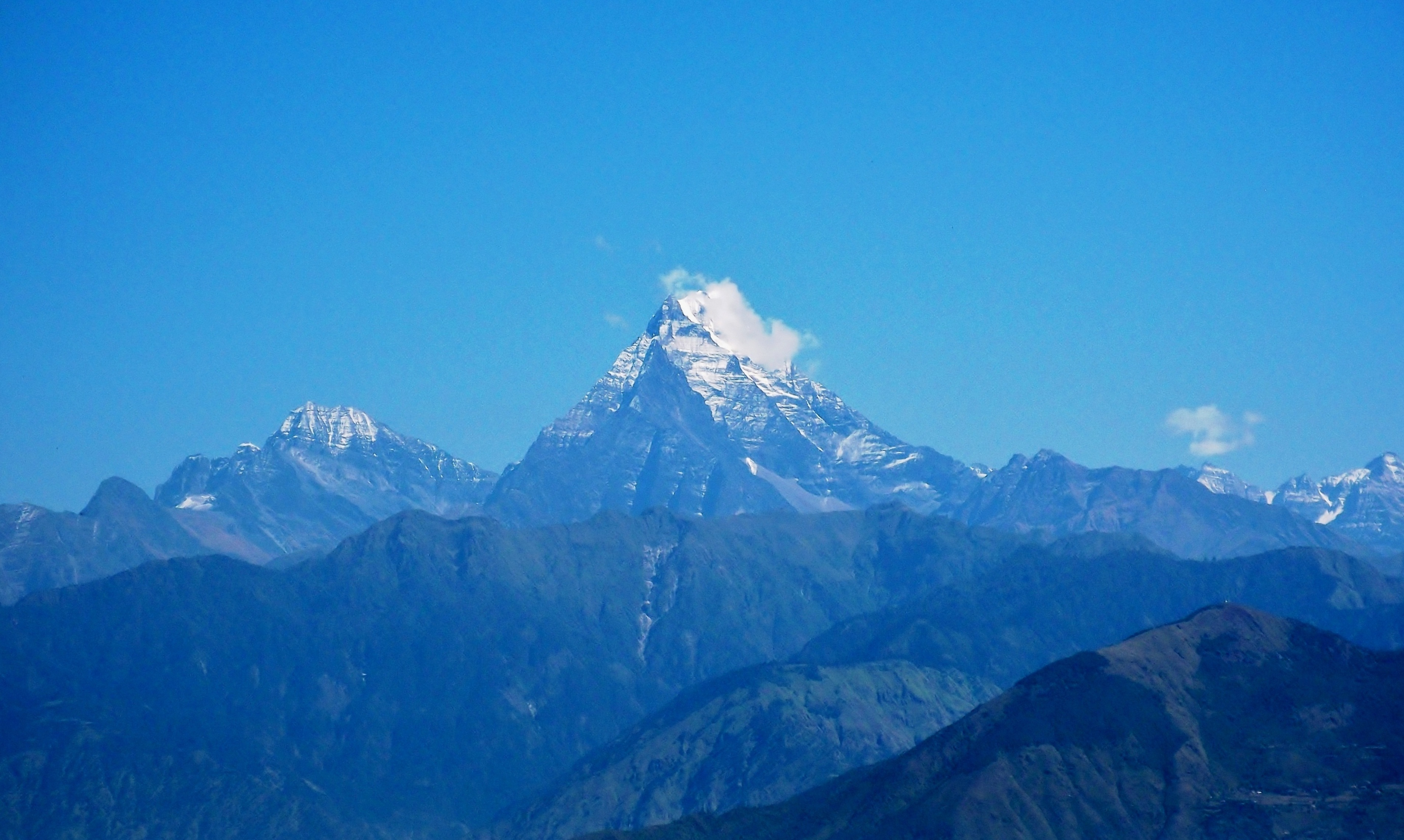
Mountains in Eastern Rukum; Dhaulagiri Himalayas in the background

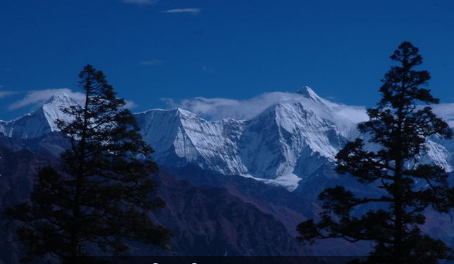
Putha Himchuli (Dhaulagiri VII), East Rukum

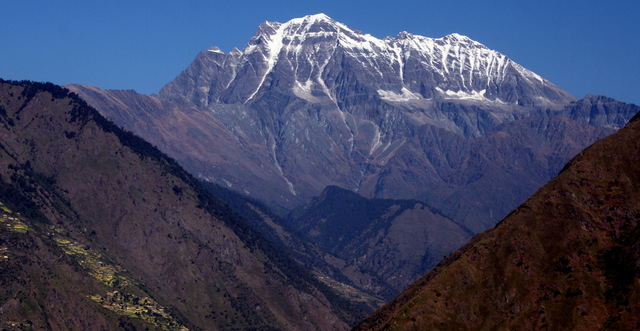
Mount Sisne, East Rukum

Being the only mountain district of Lumbini province, most of the prominent peaks of the province lie in Eastern Rukum District along the Dhaulagiri range. The tallest mountain of Lumbini Province in Eastern Rukum, Putha Himchuli also known as Mount Dhaulagiri VII, has an altitude of 7,246 meters and is one of the popular trekking peak of the Dhaulagiri region. The mountain was first ascended jointly by British explorer J.O.M Roberts and Nepalese climber Ang Nyima Sherpa in 1954. Mount Sisne I remained an unclimbed summit until 2013, and the first successful ascent was made by a mountaineering team led by Man Bahadur Khatri.

List of highest peaks of Lumbini
S/N	Mountains	Elevation (meters)	District	Range	Additional Information
1	Mount Putha I	7,246	Eastern Rukum District	Dhaulagiri Range	95th highest in the world. Date of first ascent: 1954 AD
2	Mount Putha II (Putha shoulder)	6,598	Eastern Rukum District	Dhaulagiri Range	
3	Mount Dogari (South)	6,315	Eastern Rukum District	Dhaulagiri Range	
4	Mount Samjang	5,924	Eastern Rukum District	Dhaulagiri Range	
5	Hiunchuli Patan	5,916	Eastern Rukum District	Dhaulagiri Range	
6	Mount Nimku	5,864	Eastern Rukum District	Dhaulagiri Range	
7	Mount Sisne II	5,854	Eastern Rukum District	Dhaulagiri Range	
8	Mount Sisne I	5,849	Eastern Rukum District	Dhaulagiri Range	Date of first ascent: 26 May 2021 AD

A recent 2023 study in the highland community areas of the Himalayan region in Eastern Rukum has shown their disproportionate impact to climate change crisis, such as changes in rainfall patterns, droughts, unpredictable seasonal changes and absence of snow. The direct impacts are being felt more severely by pastoral communities due to depleting grasslands. UN Mission in Nepal (UNMIN) is operational in eastern Rukum, and is a development partner in areas such as climate vulnerability, sustainable environmental and economical development, among others.

=== Protected areas ===
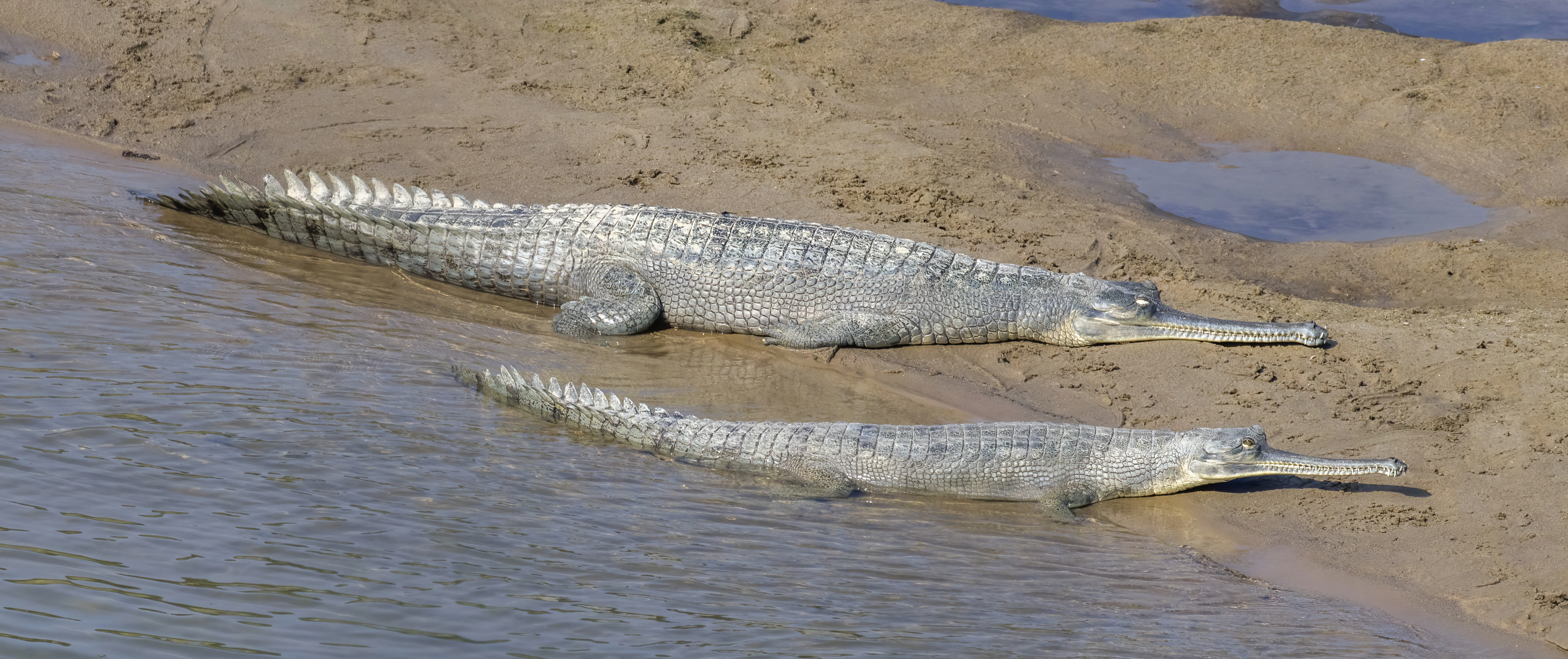
Gharials (Gavialis gangeticus) sun basking in Bardiya National Park

Three regions of the province have been designated as protected; two national parks in the Terai lowlands of Banke and Bardiya - namely Banke National Park and Bardiya National Park which constitute the Tiger Conservation Unit of Nepal and a hunting reserve in the north of the province called Dhorpatan Hunting Reserve in Eastern Rukum which is the only hunting reserve in the country.

=== Lakes and Rivers ===
With a multi-altitudinal variation in regional landscape stretching from high mountains in the north, to the hills in the middle and to the plains of the south; Lumbini province has 97 lakes with the plains of Terai constituting 92% of all the lakes of the province. The hilly and the mountain region constitute 6% and 2% of all the lakes respectively. District-wise, Rupandehi has 28 lakes making it the district with the largest number of lakes of the province; followed by Kapilvastu (24), Parasi (21), Dang (8), Banke (4), Bardiya (3), Arghakhanchi (2), Palpa (2),Pyuthan (2), Eastern Rukum (2) and Rolpa (2). Some of the most popular lakes of the province are Bahrakune, Jakhera, Gajedi and Taalpokhara.

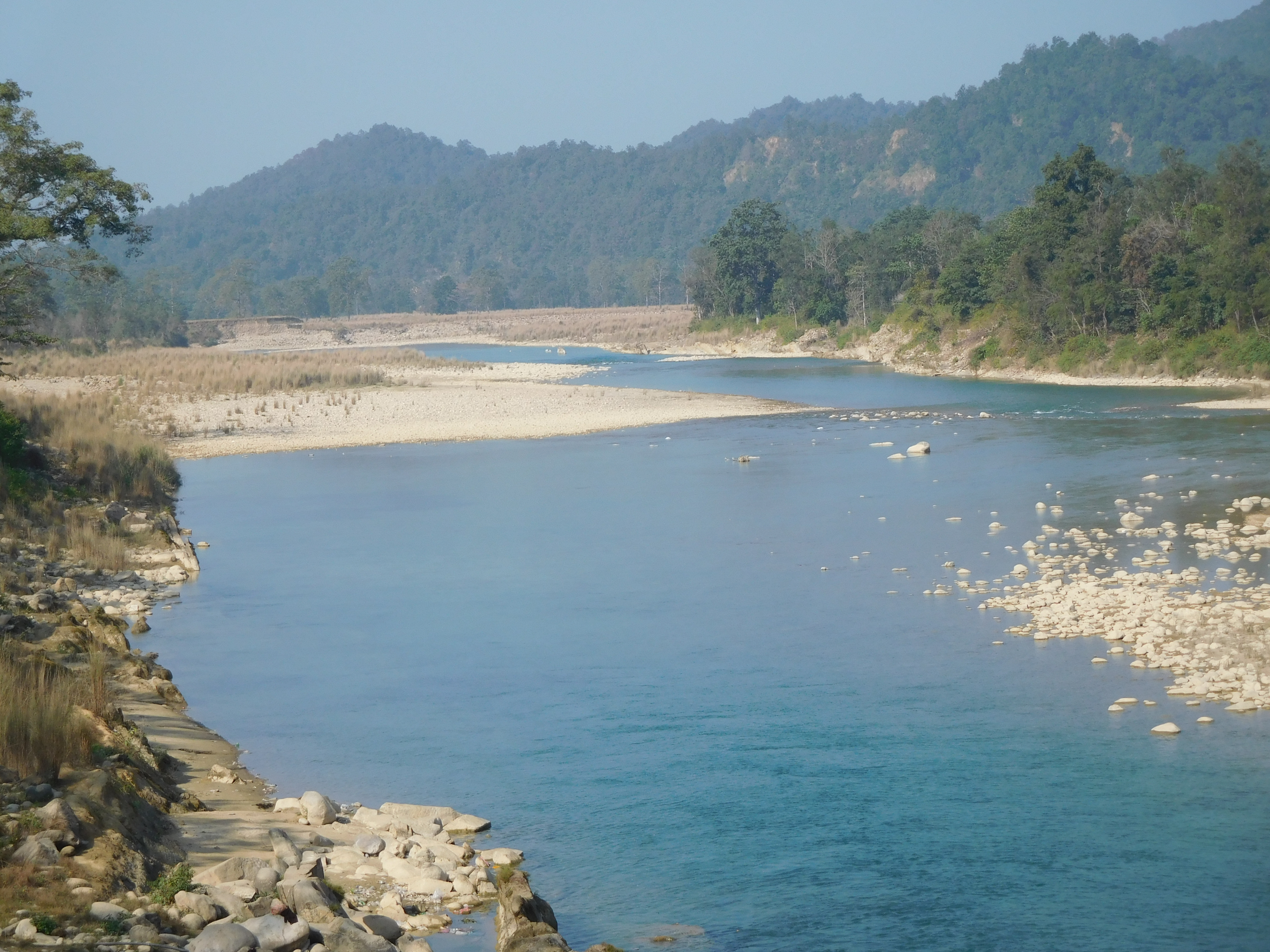
Babai River of Lumbini Province is a site of Paleolithic Hand axes, dated (1.8 million to 100,000 years ago)

One of the five sacred rivers of Buddhism, the ancient Airavati river now known as the West Rapti River, has its drainage source in the lesser Himalayas of Eastern Rukum in the north of the province. The river flows traversing the districts of Eastern Rukum, Rolpa, Arghakhanchi, Pyuthan, Dang, and Banke. The river then flows to the Sravasti district of Indian State of Uttar Pradesh - one of the ancient and most sacred city of Buddhism where Gautama Buddha spent most of his life after enlightenment. The Rohini River, one of the prominent river flowing through Kapilvastu and Rupandehi, is a left tributary of the West Rapti River. Gandaki River, on the north-east, marks the boundary of Lumbini province with Gandaki Province.

Another river called Babai River draining the inner Terai of Dang Valley, Salyan and Bardiya remains a river of particular international archeological interest. The discovery of ancient Hand axes and other artifacts on the deposits along the river in Dang Valley have marked the region as prehistoric. The artifacts have been dated to early Paleolithic (1.8 million to 100,000 years ago) and are classified as Acheulean or second-generation tools that succeed the oldest Olduwan.

== Demographics ==
In 2021 Lumbini had a census population of 5,122,078 with 1,141,902 households. 8.59% of the population is under 5 years of age. It has a literacy rate of 78.08% and a sex ratio of 1087 females per 1000 males.

=== Ethnicity ===
Castes/ethnic groups in Lumbini Province (2021)
1. Magar (14.6%)
2. Tharu (14.3%)
3. Chhetri (14.2%)
4. Bahun (11.3%)
5. Muslim (7.13%)
6. Kami (6.08%)
7. Yadav (4.09%)
8. Chamar (2.10%)
9. Damai (1.92%)
10. Kurmi (1.73%)
11. Sarki (1.49%)
12. Thakuri (1.47%)
13. Other Madheshi non-Dalit (12.3%)
14. Other Hill Janjati (2.77%)
15. Other Madheshi Dalit (2.67%)
16. Others (1.90%)

Lumbini province is ethnically diverse. The hill districts are dominated by the Magars (15% of the population), who are in majority in Palpa and East Rukum and are the largest ethnic group is multiple other hill districts. They are the dominant Hill Janjati group. Khas people make up a large population in both hills and plains. Khas people make up 37% of the population, of which Khas Dalits are 10% of the population.

The plains have inhabitants from all groups. The eastern Terai districts are dominated by Madheshis, but also have a significant minority from the hill districts. The western two districts of Banke and Bardiya are dominated by Tharus (14% of the population) with a large minority of hill people.

=== Religion ===
Religion in Lumbini Province (2021)
1. Hindu (88.4%)
2. Islam (7.45%)
3. Buddhism (1.99%)
4. Christianity (1.15%)
5. Prakriti (0.92%)
6. Other or not stated (0.13%)

The majority of population in the province practices Hinduism, followed by Islam, Buddhism and Christianity. Among these, almost 90% of the people identify themselves as Hindus and 7% identify themselves as Muslims, 2% as Buddhists and 1% as Christians. Often cited as an example of social harmony, the majority population of Hindus and Muslims of Lumbini and the surrounding villages have safeguarded and promoted the Buddhist heritage sites together in unison.

=== Language ===
Languages of Lumbini Province (2021)
1. Nepali (50.9%)
2. Awadhi (16.7%)
3. Tharu (13.6%)
4. Bhojpuri (11.0%)
5. Magar Dhut (3.81%)
6. Magar Kham (1.15%)
7. Others (2.93%)

Nepali is the most spoken language of the province, and is the dominant language in the hills and a significant minority language in the plains. Awadhi and Bhojpuri are the two main languages in the plains, while Tharu is dominant in the westernmost two districts in the plains. The two Magar languages (Dhut and Kham) are both spoken in the hills.

The Language Commission of Nepal has recommended Tharu and Awadhi as official languages in the province. The commission has also recommended Bhojpuri, Magar and Maithili to be additional official languages, for specific regions and purposes in the province.

== Administrative subdivisions ==
There is a total of 109 local administrative units in the province which include four sub-metropolitan cities, 32 urban municipalities, and 73 rural municipalities.

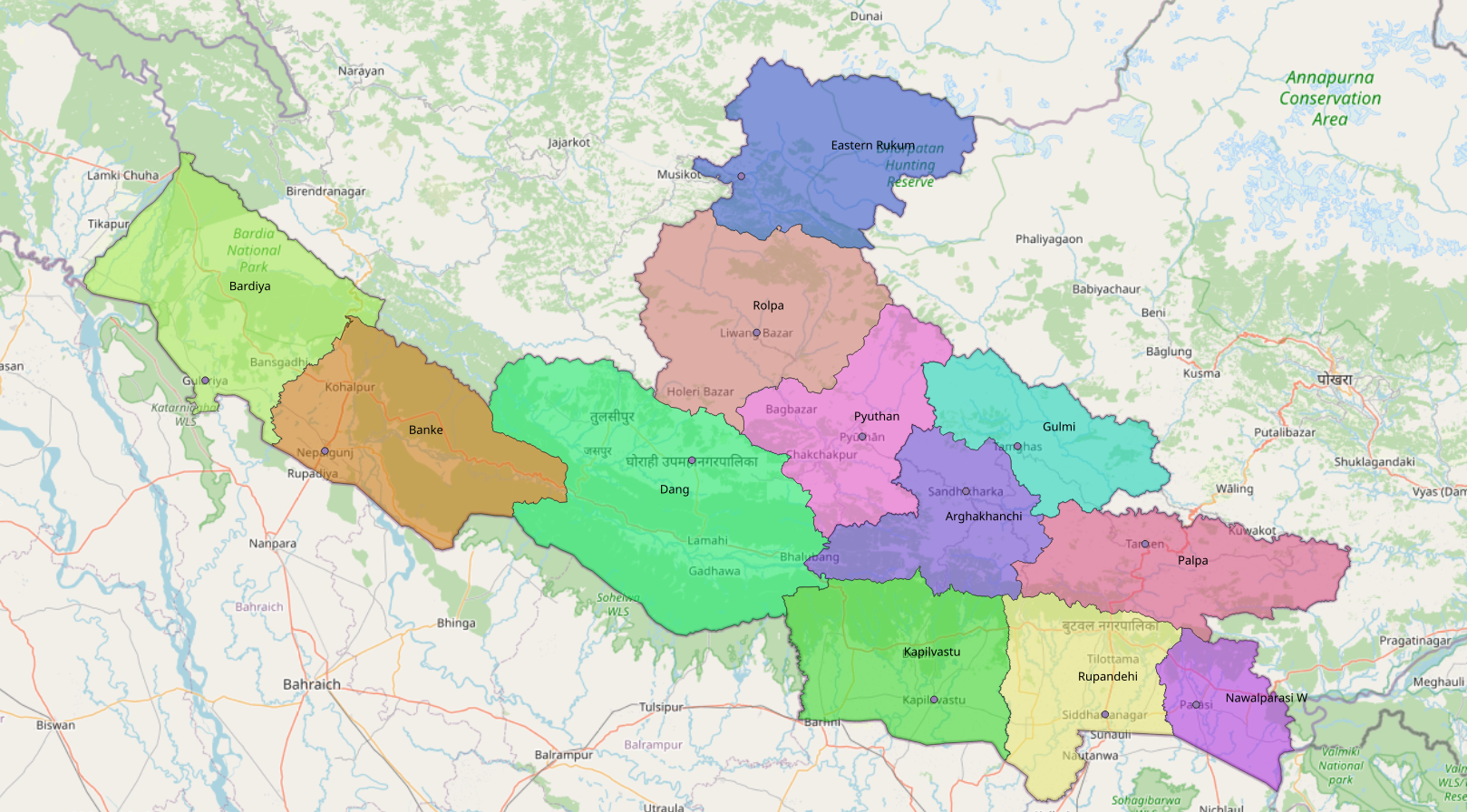
Districts of Lumbini

=== Districts ===
Districts in Nepal are the second level of administrative divisions after provinces. Lumbini Province is divided into 12 districts, which are listed below. A district is administered by the head of the District Coordination Committee and the District Administration Officer. The districts are further divided into municipalities or rural municipalities.

After the state's reconstruction of administrative divisions, Nawalparasi District and Rukum District were divided into Parasi District and Nawalpur District, and Eastern Rukum District and Western Rukum District respectively.

Districts of Lumbini Province
Districts	Nepali	Headquarters	Area (km^{2}.)	Population (2011)	Official Website
Kapilvastu District	कपिलवस्तु जिल्ला	Taulihawa	1,738	571,936	
Parasi District	परासी जिल्ला	Ramgram	634.88	321,058	
Rupandehi District	रुपन्देही जिल्ला	Siddharthanagar	1,360	880,196	
Arghakhanchi District	अर्घाखाँची जिल्ला	Sandhikharka	1,193	197,632	
Gulmi District	गुल्मी जिल्ला	Tamghas	1,149	280,160	
Palpa District	पाल्पा जिल्ला	Tansen	1,373	261,180	
Dang District	दाङ जिल्ला	Ghorahi	2,955	552,583	
Pyuthan District	प्युठान जिल्ला	Pyuthan	1,309	228,102	
Rolpa District	रोल्पा जिल्ला	Liwang	1,879	224,506	
Eastern Rukum District	पूर्वी रूकुम जिल्ला	Rukumkot	1,161.13	53,018	
Banke District	बाँके जिल्ला	Nepalganj	2,337	491,313	
Bardiya District	बर्दिया जिल्ला	Gulariya	2,025	426,576	
Lumbini Province	लुम्बिनी प्रदेश	Deukhuri	22,288 km^{2}	4,499,272	

=== Municipality ===
Cities and villages are governed by municipalities in Nepal. A district may have one or more municipalities. Lumbini has two types of municipalities.

1. Urban Municipality (Urban Municipality has three levels):
  1. Metropolitan city (Mahanagarpalika)
  2. Sub-metropolitan city (Upa-mahanagarpalika) and
  3. Municipality (Nagarpalika)
2. Rural Municipality (Gaunpalika)

The government of Nepal has set out a minimum criteria to meet city and towns. These criteria include a certain population, infrastructure and revenues.

Largest cities or towns in Lumbini Province Central Bureau of Statistics
Rank		District	Pop.	Rank		District	Pop.
1	Ghorahi	Dang	156,164	11	Shivaraj	Kapilvastu	66,781
2	Tulsipur	Dang	141,528	12	Gulariya	Bardiya	66,679
3	Nepalgunj	Banke	138,951	13	Buddhabhumi	Kapilvastu	64,949
4	Butwal	Rupandehi	138,741	14	Siddharthanagar	Rupandehi	63,483
5	Tilottama	Rupandehi	100,149	15	Krishnanagar	Kapilvastu	65,602
6	Kapilvastu	Kapilvastu	76,394	16	Rajapur	Bardiya	59,553
7	Banganga	Kapilvastu	75,242	17	Ramgram	Parasi	59,455
8	Lumbini Sanskritik	Rupandehi	72,497	18	Bansgadhi	Bardiya	55,875
9	Kohalpur	Banke	70,647	19	Sainamaina	Rupandehi	55,822
10	Barbardiya	Bardiya	68,012	20	Sunwal	Parasi	55,424

== Government ==
The Governor acts as the head of the province, while the Chief Minister is the head of the provincial government. The Chief Judge of the Tulsipur High Court is the head of the judiciary. The Speaker of the Assembly is Purna Bahadur Gharti. Umakanta Jha is the first Governor of Lumbini Province. Current Governor Dharma Nath Yadav was appointed on 4 November 2019 by the President of Nepal.

=== Provincial Assembly ===
Lumbini provincial assembly is the unicameral legislative assembly consisting of 87 members. Candidates for each constituency are chosen by the political parties or stand as independents. Each constituency elects one member under the first past the post (FPTP) system of election. The current constitution specifies that sixty percent of the members should be elected from the first past the post system and forty percent through the party-list proportional representation (PR) system. Women should account for one-third of total members elected from each party. If one-third percentage are not elected, the party that fails to ensure so shall have to elect one-third of the total number as women through the party-list proportional representation.

Party	Parliamentary party leader	Seats
CPN (UML)	Lila Giri	29
Nepali Congress	Dilli Bahadur Chaudhary	27
CPN (Maoist Centre)	Jokh Bahadur Mahara	10
Nagrik Unmukti Party	Dharma Bahadur Chaudhary	4
Rastriya Prajatantra Party	Ashish Kumar Chaudhary	4
Janamat Party	Chandrakesh Gupta	3
Loktantrik Samajwadi Party	Santosh Kumar Pandeya	3
People's Socialist Party		3
CPN (Unified Socialist)		1
Rastriya Janamorcha		1
Independent		2
Total		87

== Economy ==
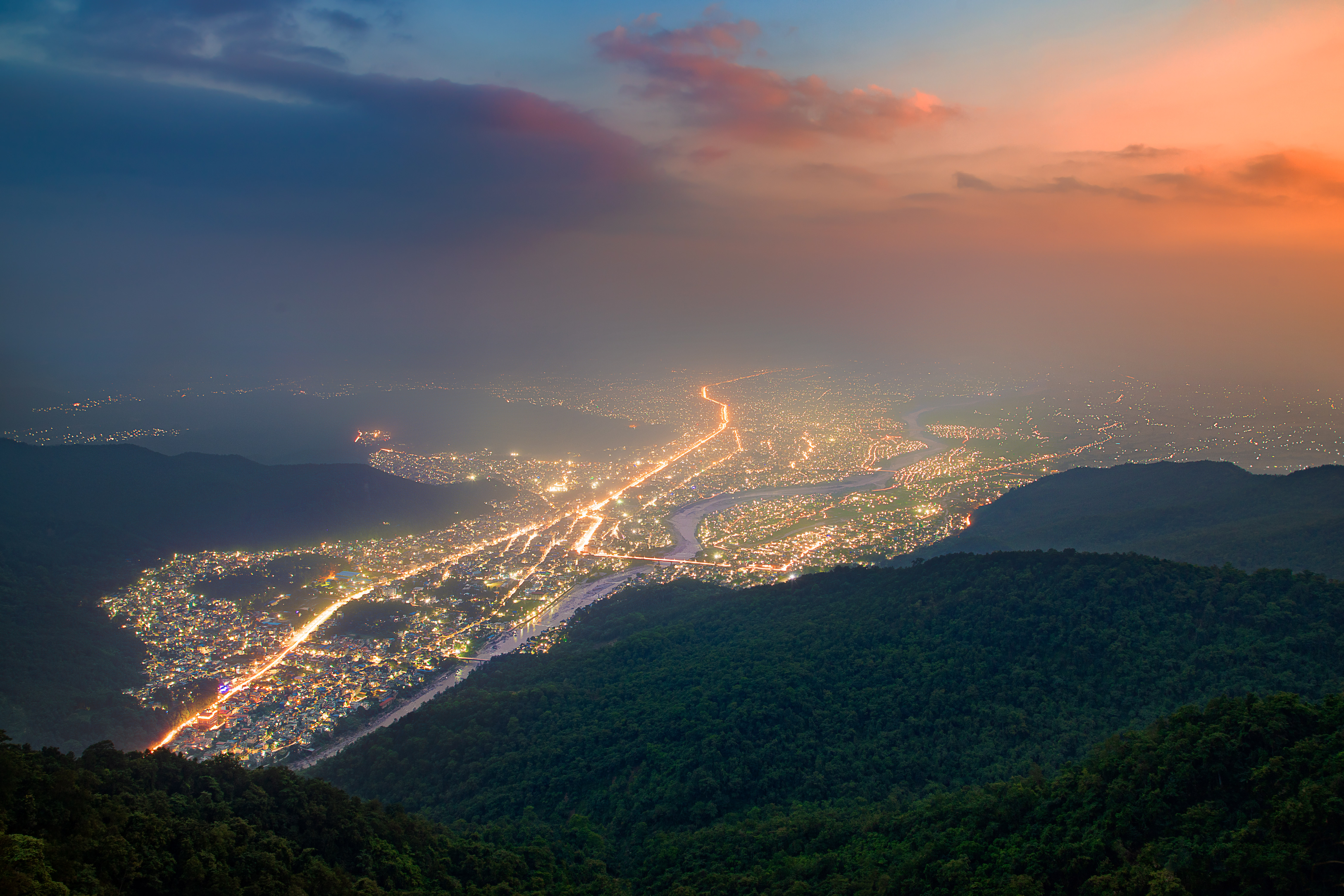
Butwal is considered the financial capital of Lumbini.

As of 2021, Lumbini Province is the 2nd fastest growing province in Nepal after Bagmati Province and is third out of the seven provinces in terms of its contribution to the GDP (14% as of 2021). The two major custom points of Nepal, Nepalganj and Siddharthanagar (Bhairahawa) are situated in the south of the province, and are major transit zones of trade and transport through India. The rapidly expanding cities in Lumbini province, Butwal and Siddharthanagar in Rupandehi District, Ghorahi and Tulsipur in Dang District, and Nepalgunj and Kohalpur in Banke District are major industrial centers.

Ranking 2nd in the number of banks and financial institutions in Nepal after Bagmati Province; several projects have been launched in the province to boost economic growth. Construction of the Gautam Buddha International Airport, upgrade of the Nepalgunj Airport into an international airport as per the 20-years master plan, establishment of industrial units in Special economic zone, and the opening of new hotels are expected to spur further economic growth in the province. The national pride projects which have been initiated in the province include:

National Pride Projects in Lumbini Province
Project	Investment (NPR)
Sikta Irrigation Project	25.2 Billion
Babai Irrigation Project	18 Billion
Bheri-Babai Diversion Multipurpose Project (including Karnali Province)	33 Billion
Gautam Buddha International Airport	6 Billion
Lumbini Development Trust	7.5 Billion
Electricity Transmission Project (including Bagmati Province)	61 Billion
North-South (Karnali) Highway (including Karnali Province)	4.1 Billion

=== Agriculture ===
The province has both temperate and tropical climates and is diverse in terms of agriculture crop production potentialities. The province is best suited for agriculture production with five core terai districts, one inner terai, and 6 other hill districts. The land is very fertile and a good source of irrigation prevails. Sikta Irrigation Project and Babai Diversion and Irrigation project have benefited the agricultural production. The major crops are paddy, mustard, wheat, maize, sugarcane, vegetables, potato, lentils and cotton. Lumbini is self-sufficient in milk, cereal crops and pulses.

The total land used for agriculture in Lumbini is 889,219 hectares. Land Holding for agriculture in the province is 484,678 hectares.

Agriculture land use area in Lumbini
Land use	Percentage	Area (Hectares)
Arable land	45.5%	404,541
Temporary Crops	44.9%	398,849
Permanent crops	5%	44,388
Woodland/Forest	0.9%	8,343
Meadows/Pasture	0.6%	5,561
Temporary Fallow	0.5%	4,389
Temporary Meadows	0.2%	1,303
Pondes	0.1%	828
Other	2.4%	21,017

=== Industry ===
Lumbini province ranks 2nd in the country after Bagmati Province in the share of small, cottage and micro-level industries numbering 81,164 that create an estimated 493,686 employment. The province also ranks 2nd nationally, after Bagmati, in the share of manufacturing industry output. By 2021, there were 16,549 registered companies in the province. In 2022, Samsung Electronics inaugurated a television assembly plant in Nawalparasi. Making the country self-sufficient in cement, Lumbini has the largest number of cement industries and constitutes 75% of total national production.

Samsung Electronics has television assembly plant in Lumbini province

Two of the prime industrial estates of Nepal in Lumbini Province - Nepalgunj industrial estate (district), the oldest industrial estate of the province, was established in 1973 AD and Butwal industrial estate was established in 1975 AD. Combined, the two industrial estates have about a hundred industries in the zone and are a significant source of revenue of the country. Post-promulgation of the Constitution of Nepal in 2015, further industrial estates were declared in the province by the Council of Ministers of the Government of Nepal: Motipur industrial estate in Rupandehi and Naubasta industrial estate in Banke districts. Similarly, Dang industrial estate has been declared in Dang district.

In addition, tourism industry is a massively growing industry in Lumbini province, welcoming the largest numbers of tourists in Nepal from about 113 countries worldwide.

== Tourism ==
=== Lumbini ===
Lumbini, considered one of the holiest place in Buddhism associated with the Buddha's birth, is a World Heritage Site and the most visited place in Nepal with 1.5 million tourist arriving annually. Lumbini has a number of older temples, including the Mayadevi Temple - a site traditionally considered to be the birthplace of the Buddha, and various new temples funded by Buddhist organizations from various countries that have been completed or are still under construction.

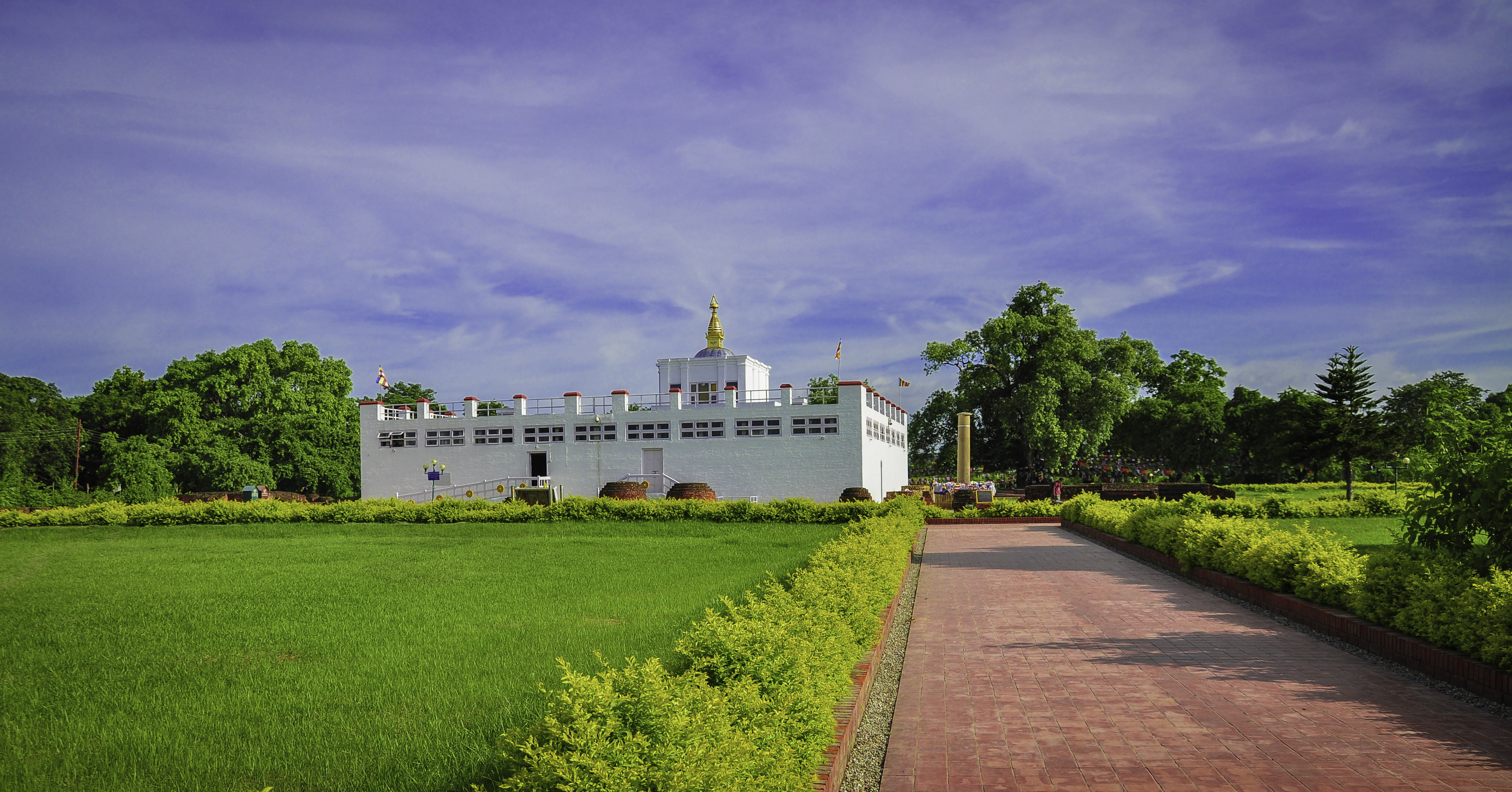
Mayadevi Temple marking the Buddha's birthplace

The ancient ruins of complex structures have been conserved in the area including the Shakya tank – the remains within the Mayadevi Temple with brick structures and cross-wall system that have been dated from the 3rd century BC, Ashoka pillar, excavated remains of Buddhist monasteries of the 3rd century BC to the 5th century AD and the remains of Buddhist stupas (memorial shrines) dated between the 3rd century BC to the 15th century AD. In addition to the ruins of ancient monasteries, there is a sacred Bodhi tree and an ancient bathing pond.

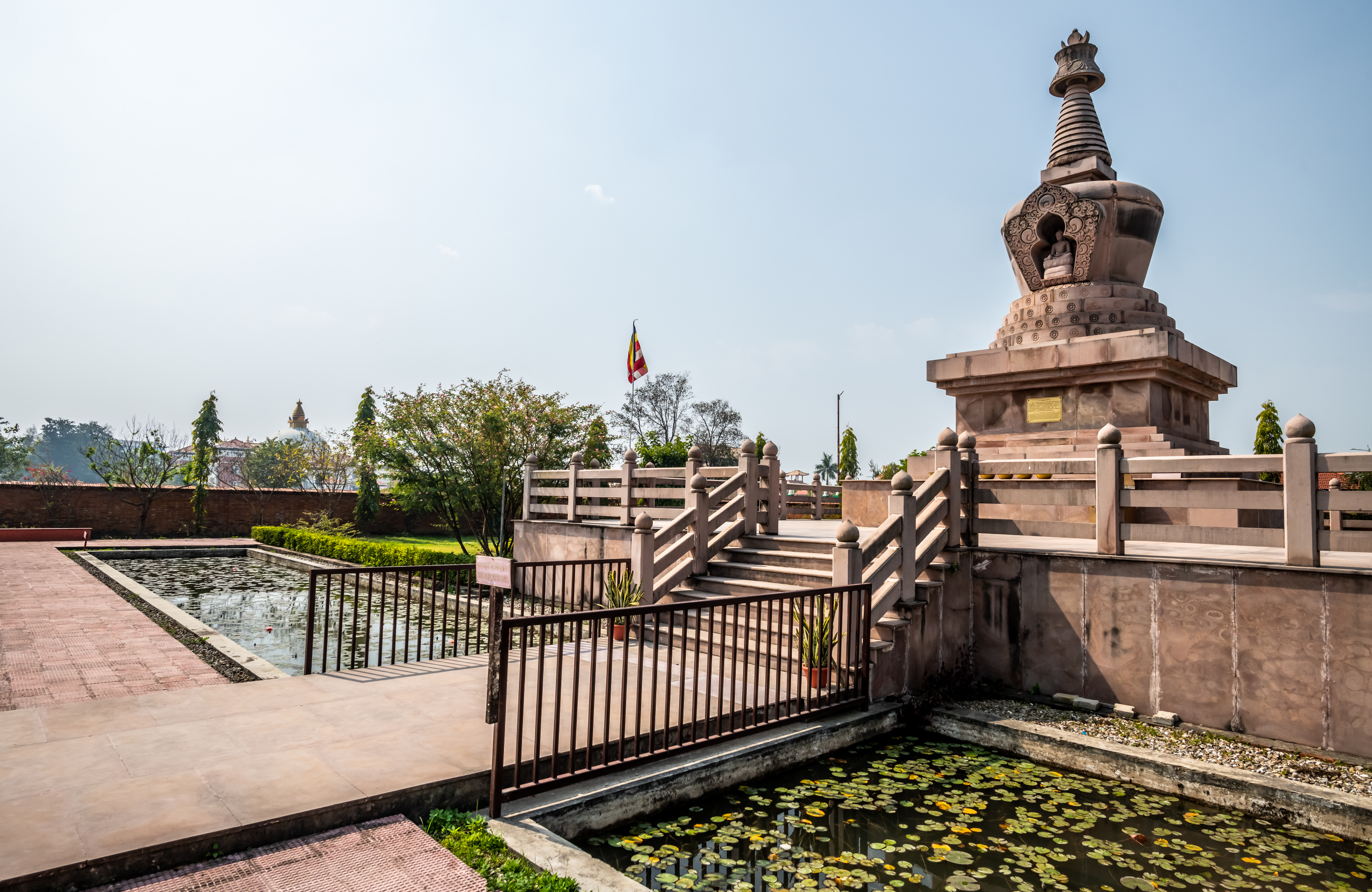
French monastery in Lumbini complex

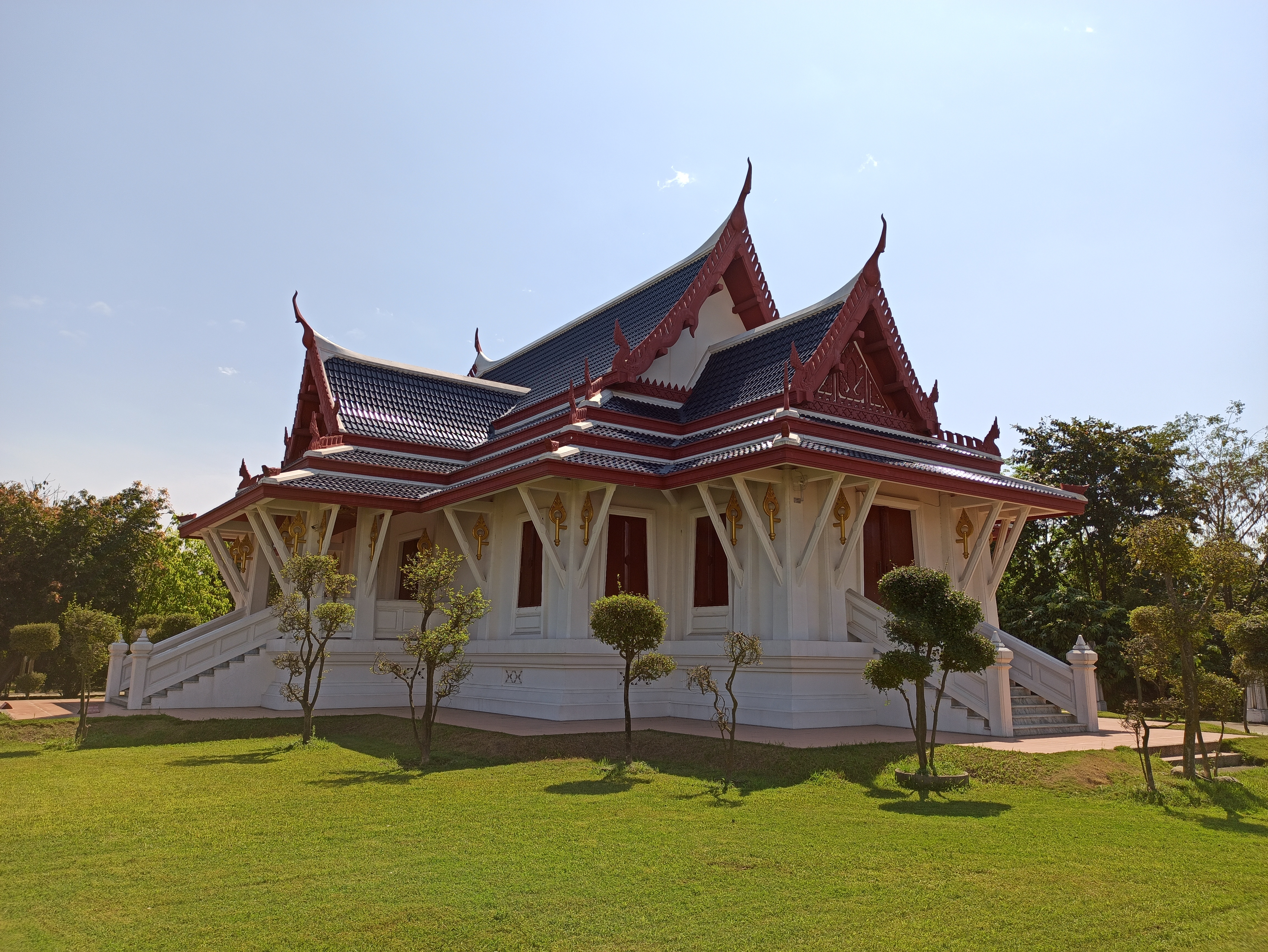
Royal Thai monastery

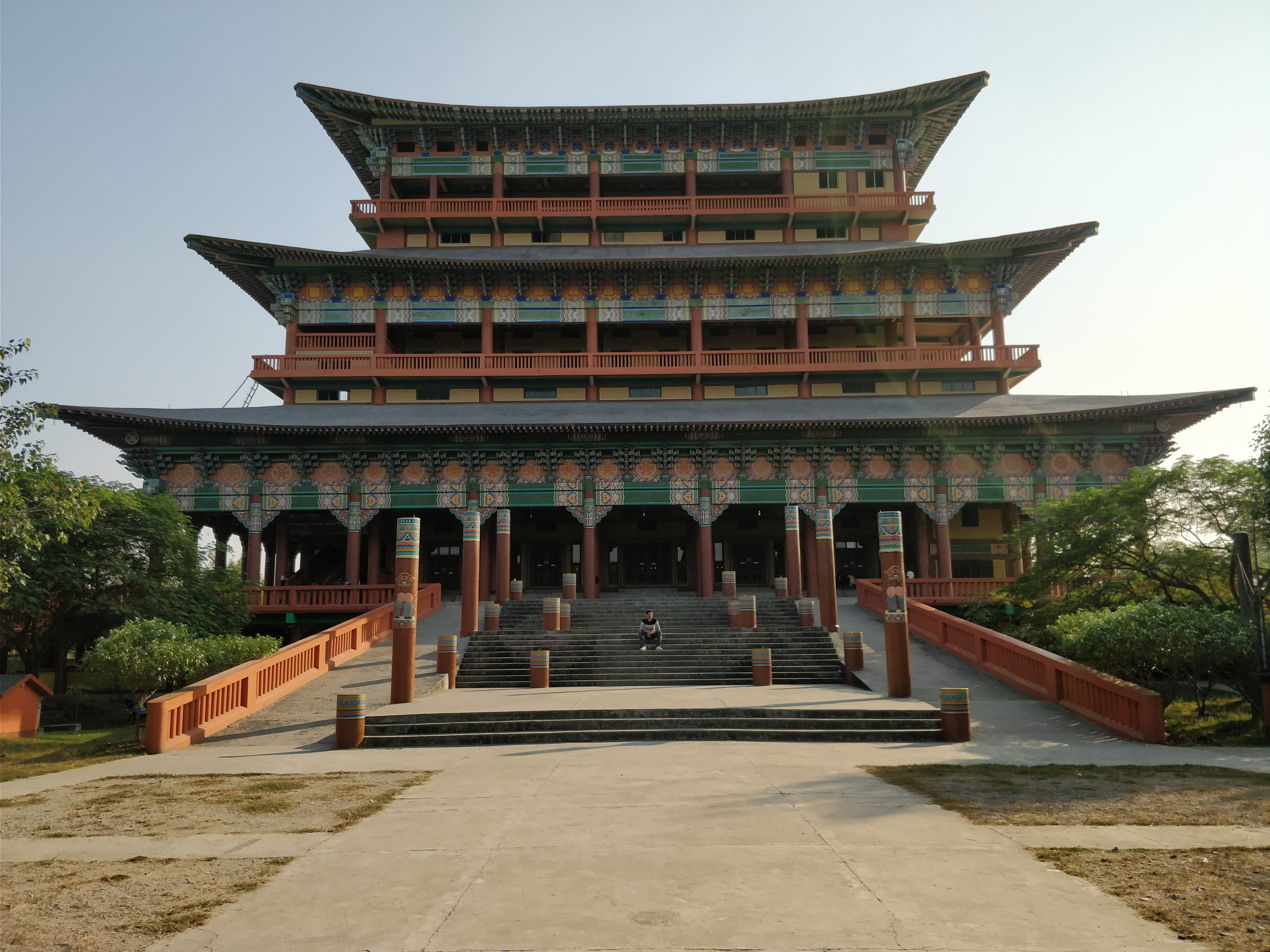
South Korean Stupa

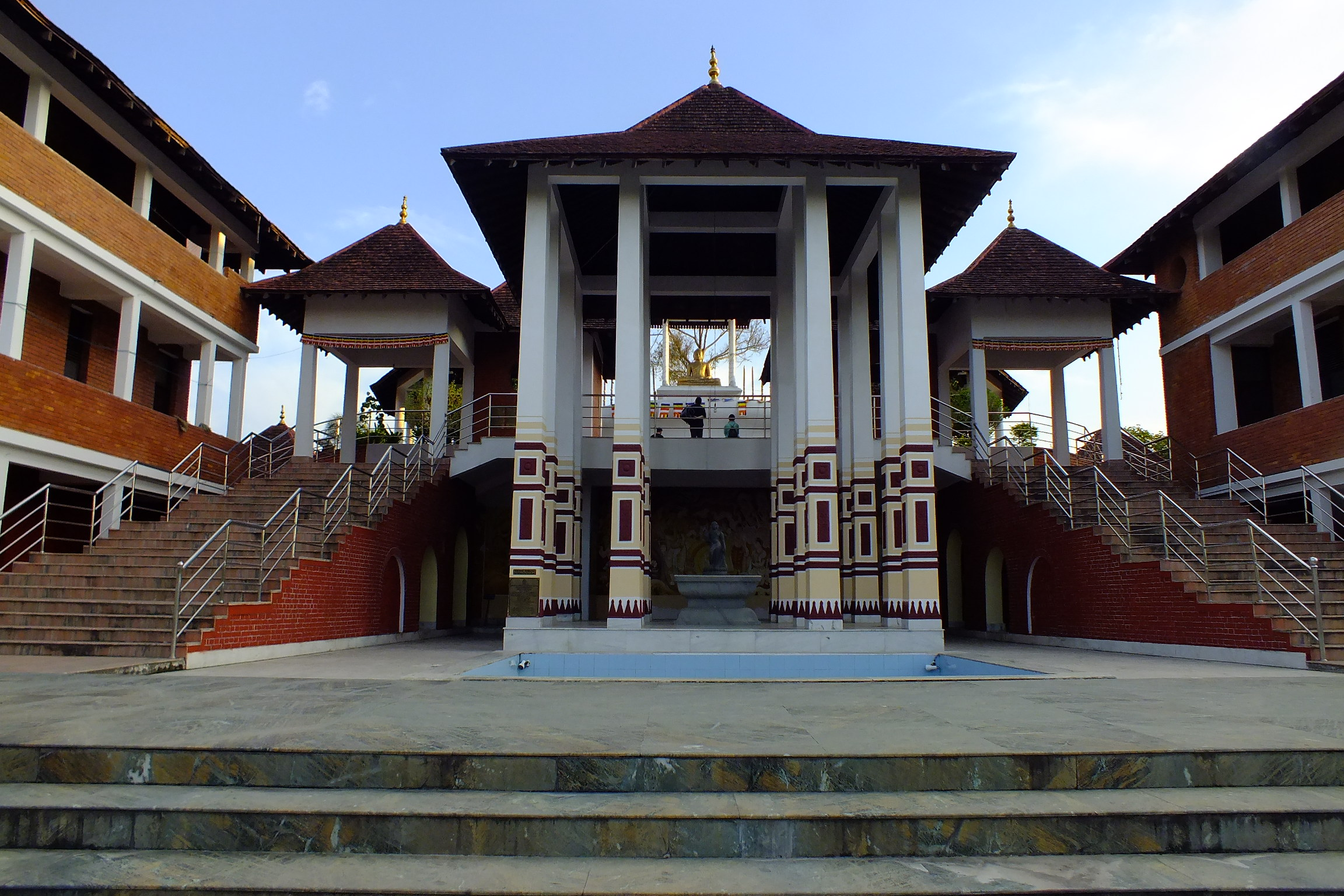
Sri Lankan Temple

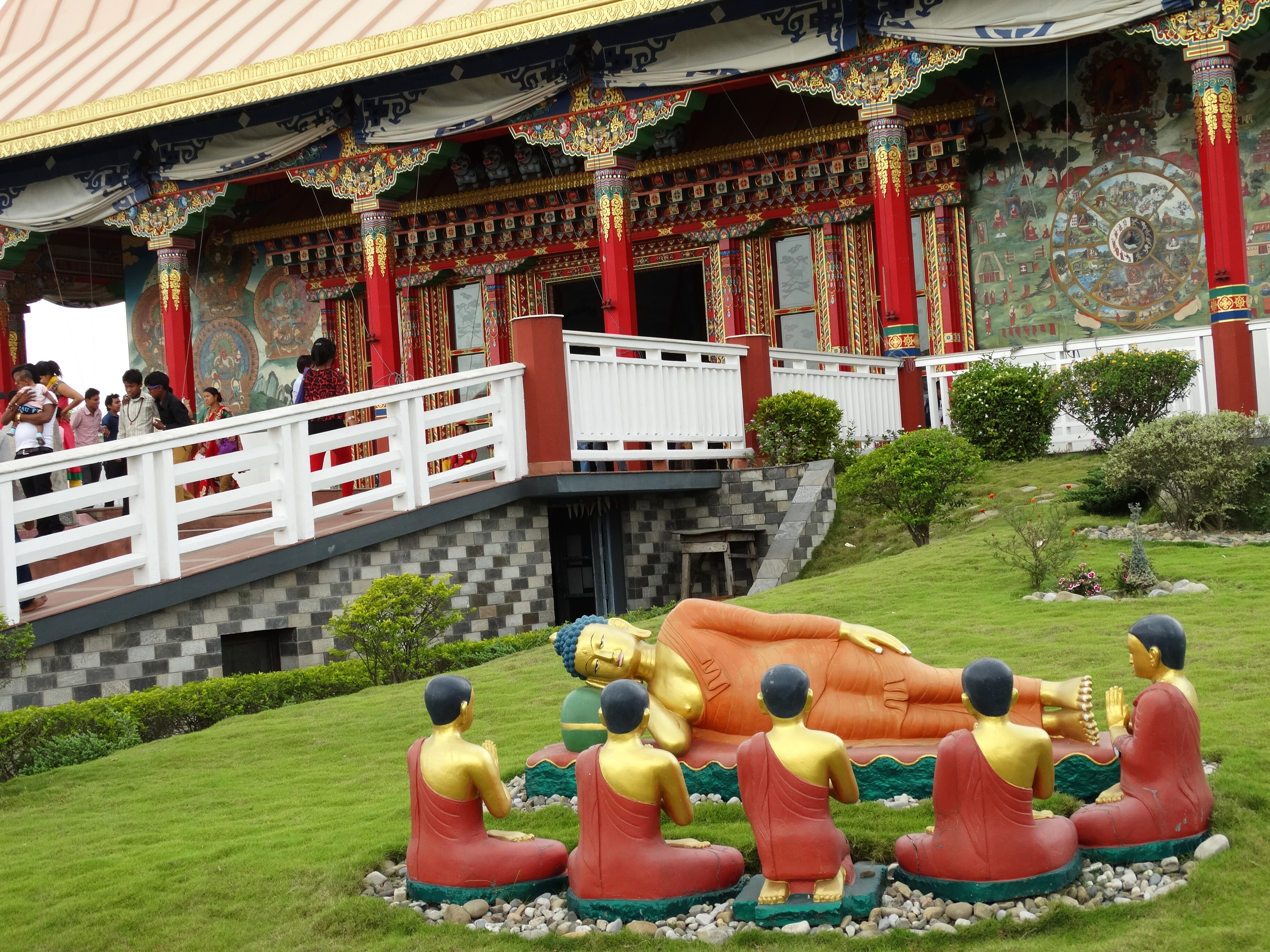
German monastery

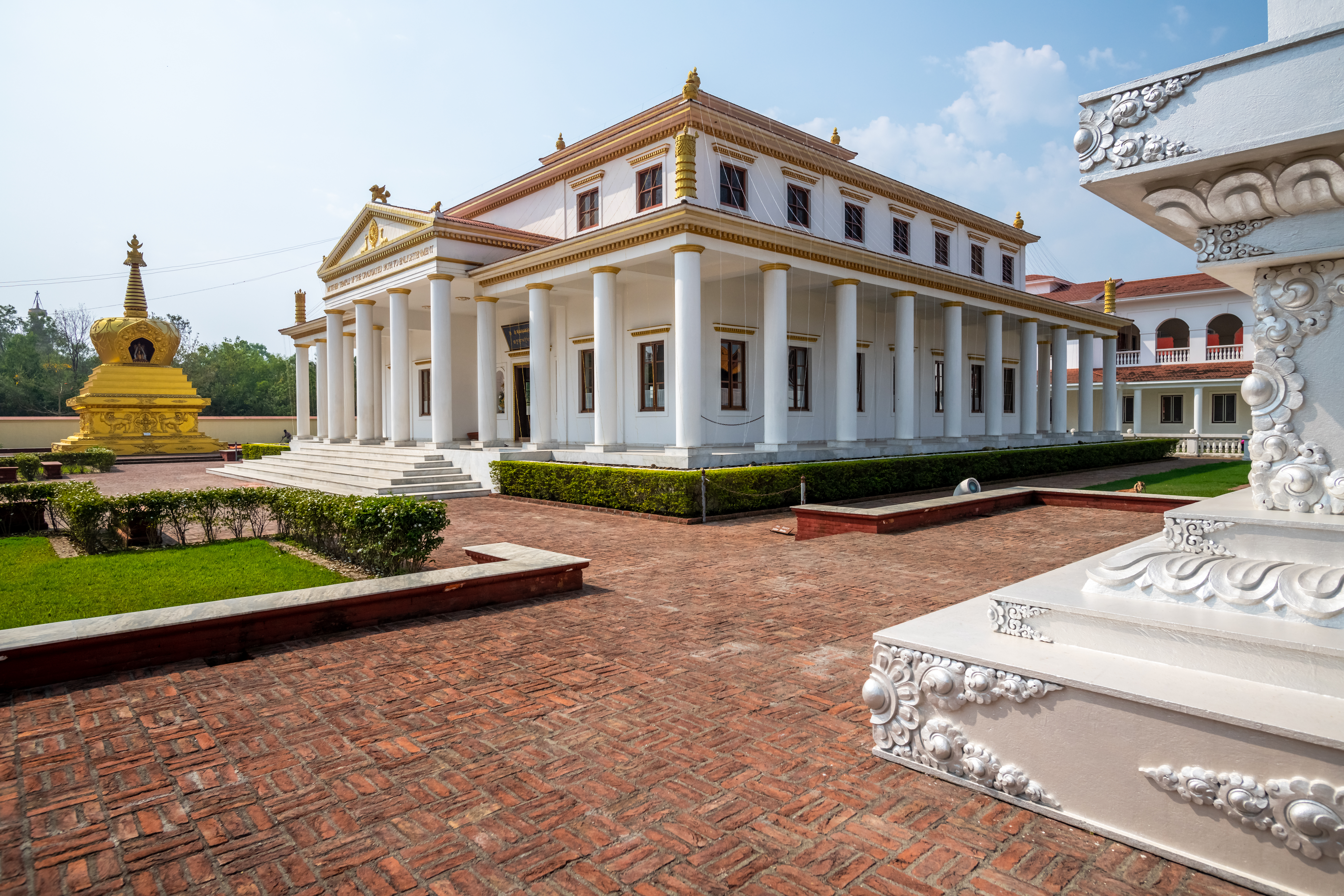
Austrian monastery

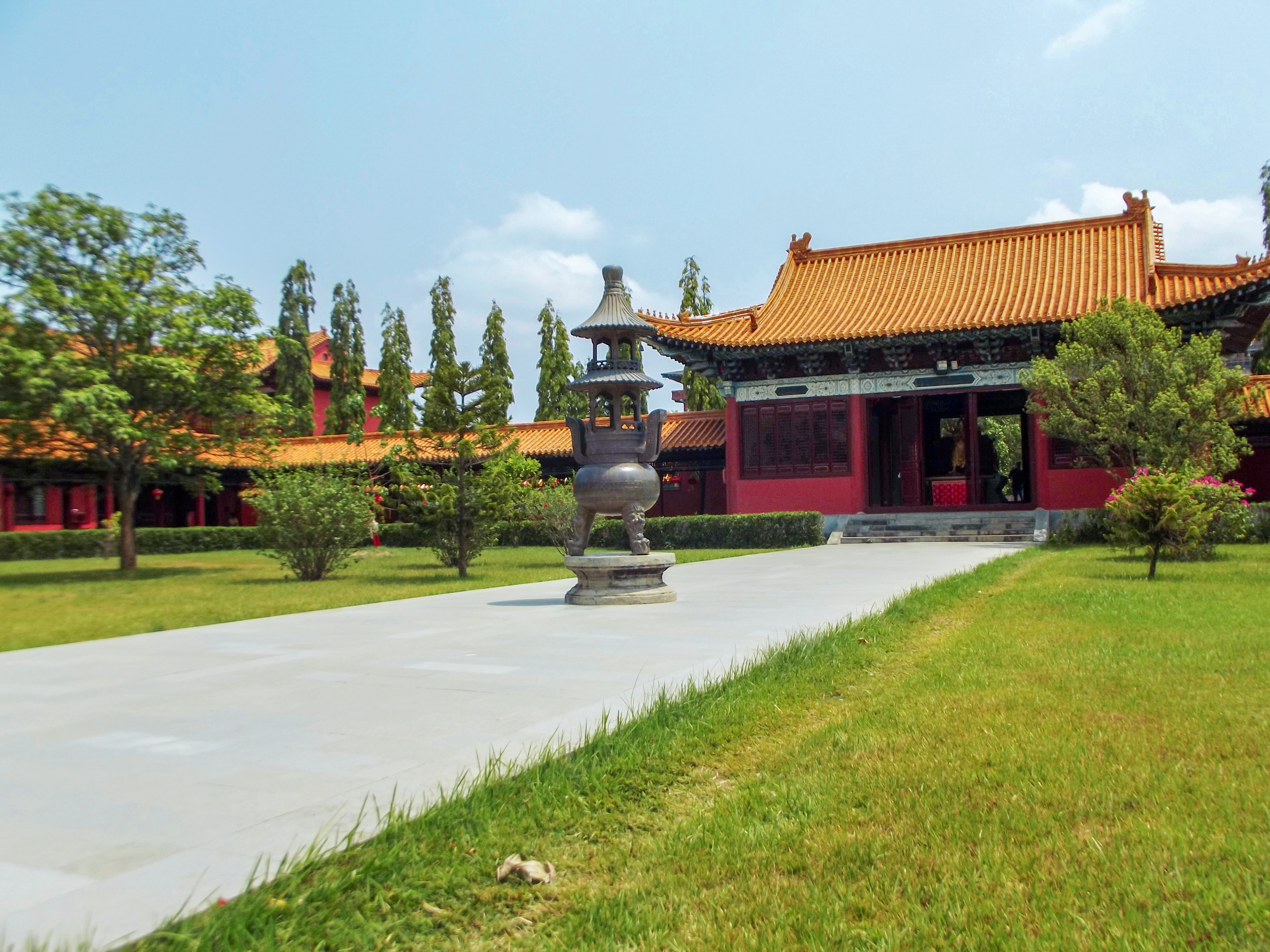
Chinese Monastery

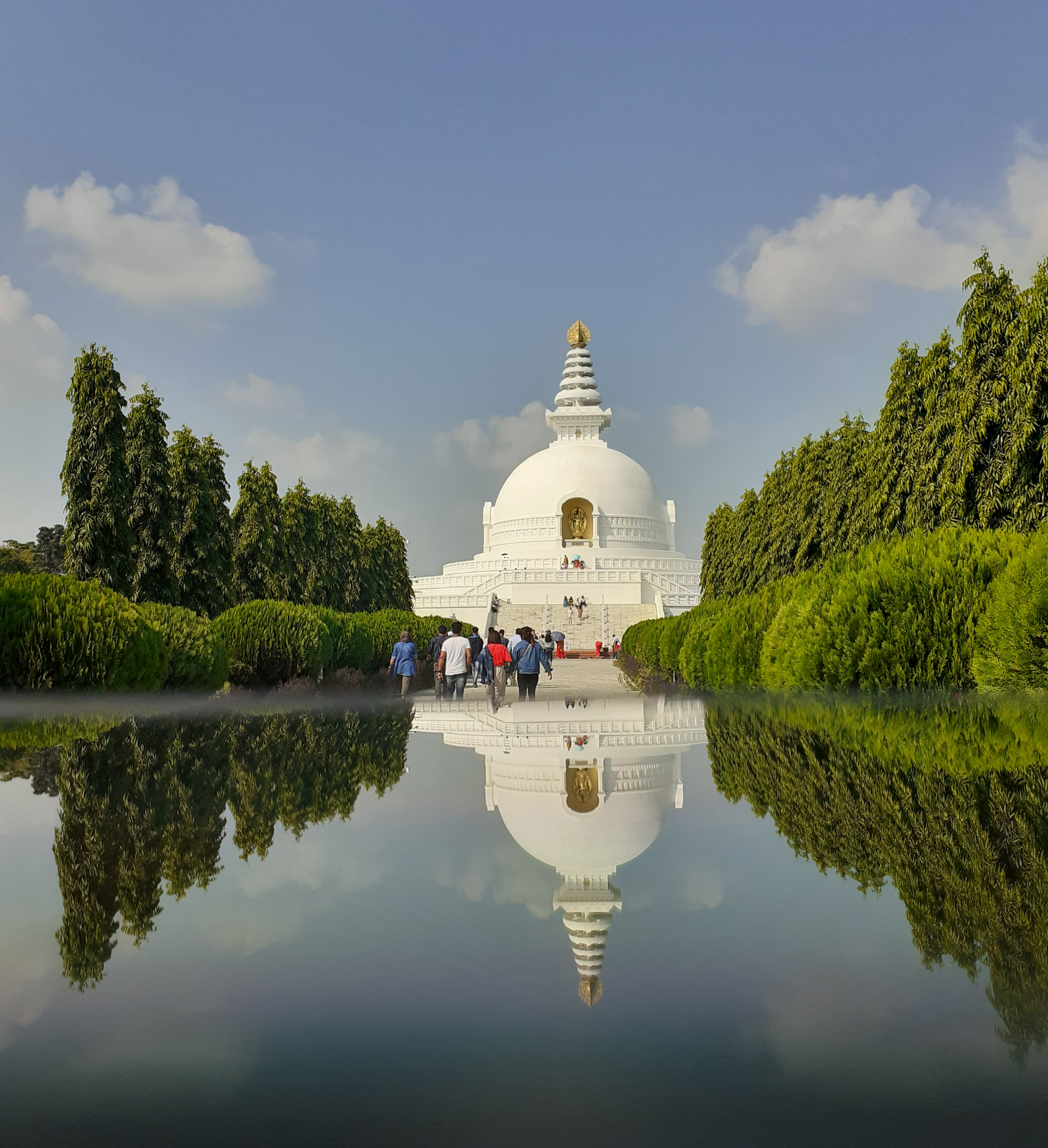
World Peace Pagoda, Lumbini

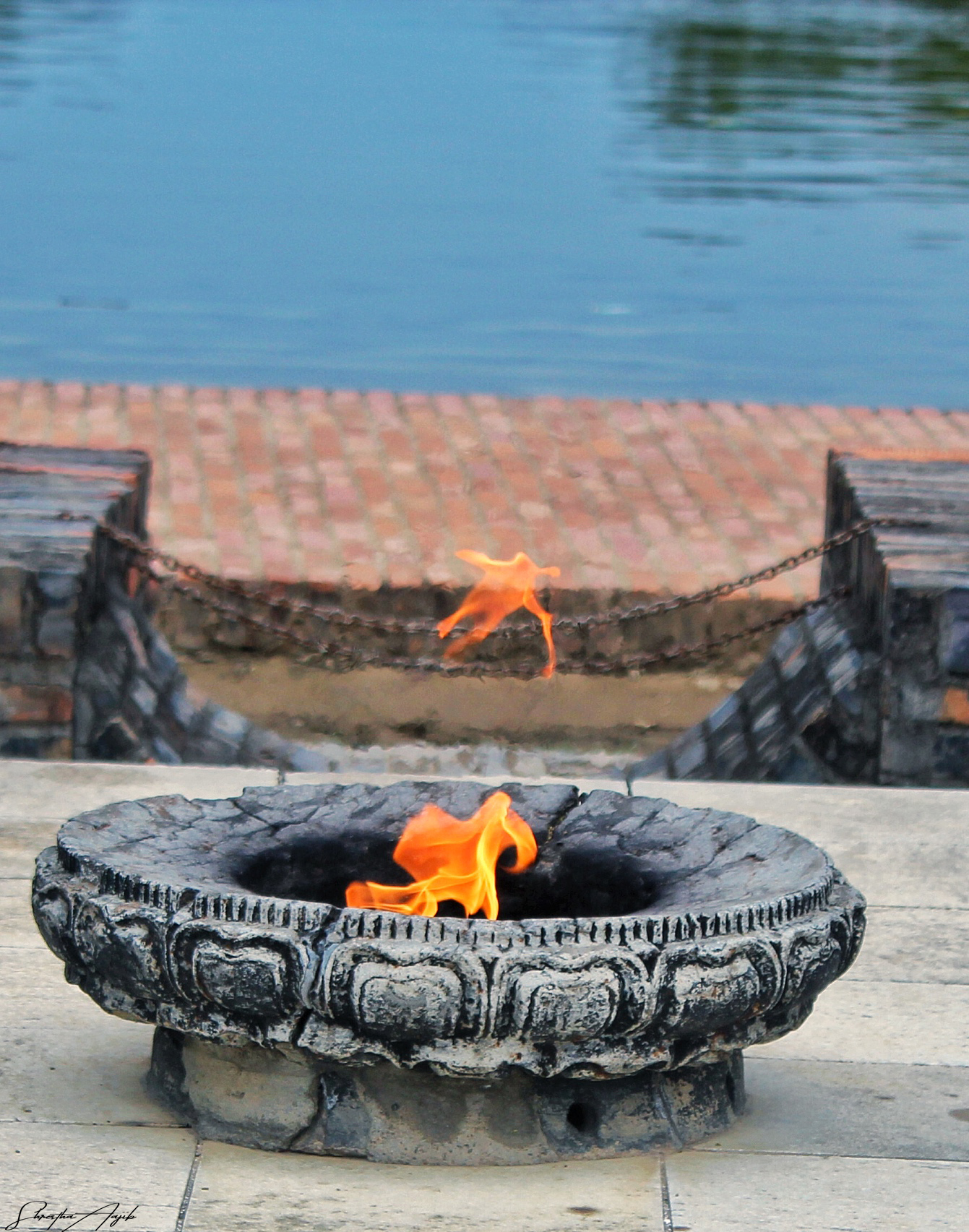
Eternal Peace Flame (Shanti dip), Lumbini

Lumbini complex is divided into three areas: Sacred garden, Monastic zone, Cultural center and new Lumbini village. The sacred garden is the epicenter of the complex which is centered around the birthplace of Buddha and consists of the Mayadevi Temple, the Asoka Pillar, the Marker Stone, the Nativity Sculpture, Sacred Pond (Puskarini), and many structural ruins including Buddhist Viharas & Stupas. The monastic zone is divided into east and west each reflecting two different schools of Buddhism. As a centre of pilgrimage, many countries have established their monasteries in the complex reflecting their own cultural design and spirituality. In the large monastic zone only monasteries can be built; no shops, hotels or restaurants are allowed. The zone is divided into an eastern and western monastic zone, the eastern having the Theravadin monasteries, the western having the Mahayana and Vajrayana monasteries. The Cultural Center consists of museums, Lumbini International Research Institute (LIRI), administration complex etc. and the New Lumbini Village has the World Peace Pagoda and the Lumbini Crane Sanctuary. World Peace Pagoda lies at the northern end of the Lumbini complex and was designed by Japanese buddhists to represent universal peace.

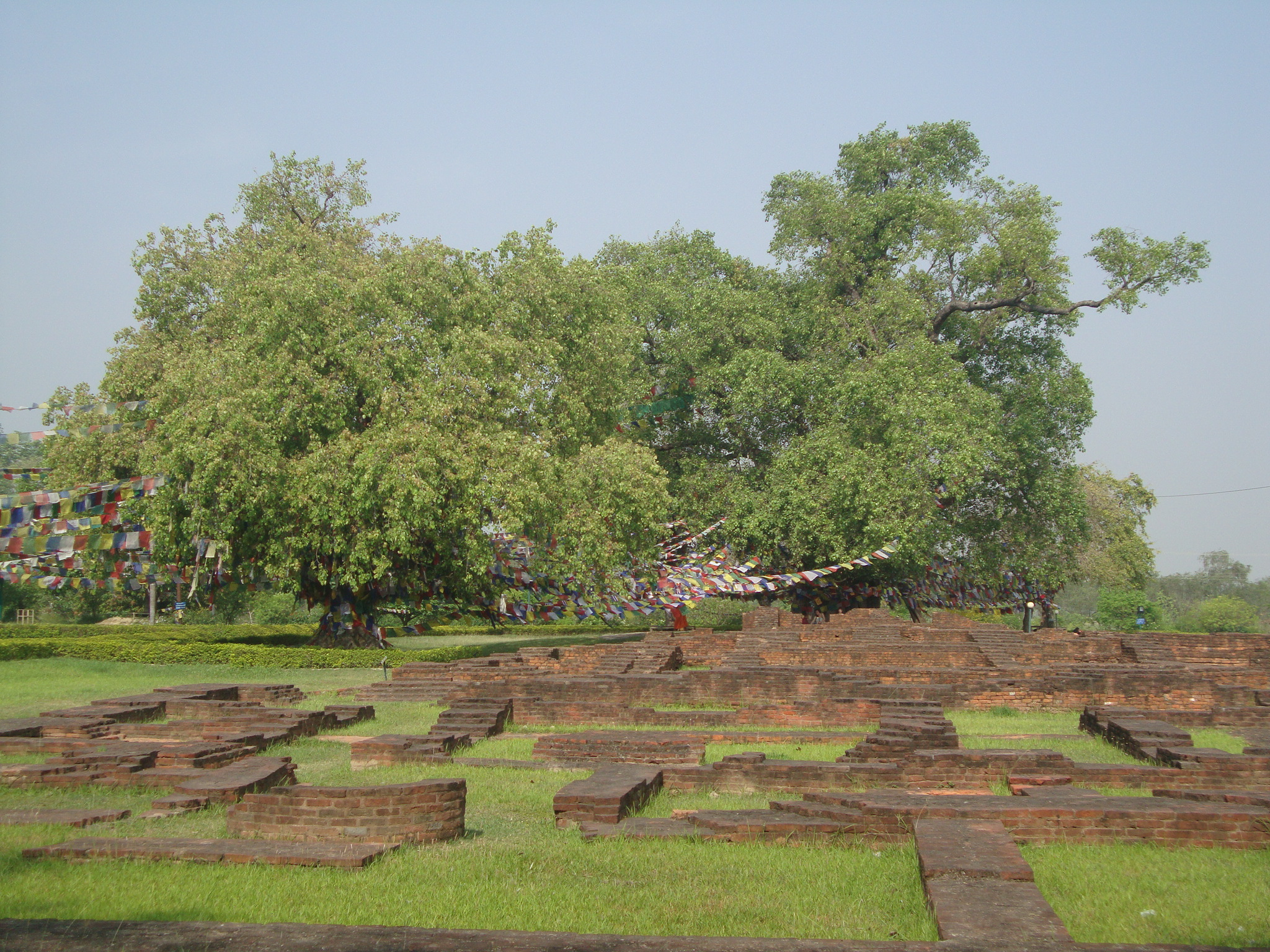
Ruins within Maya Devi Temple complex

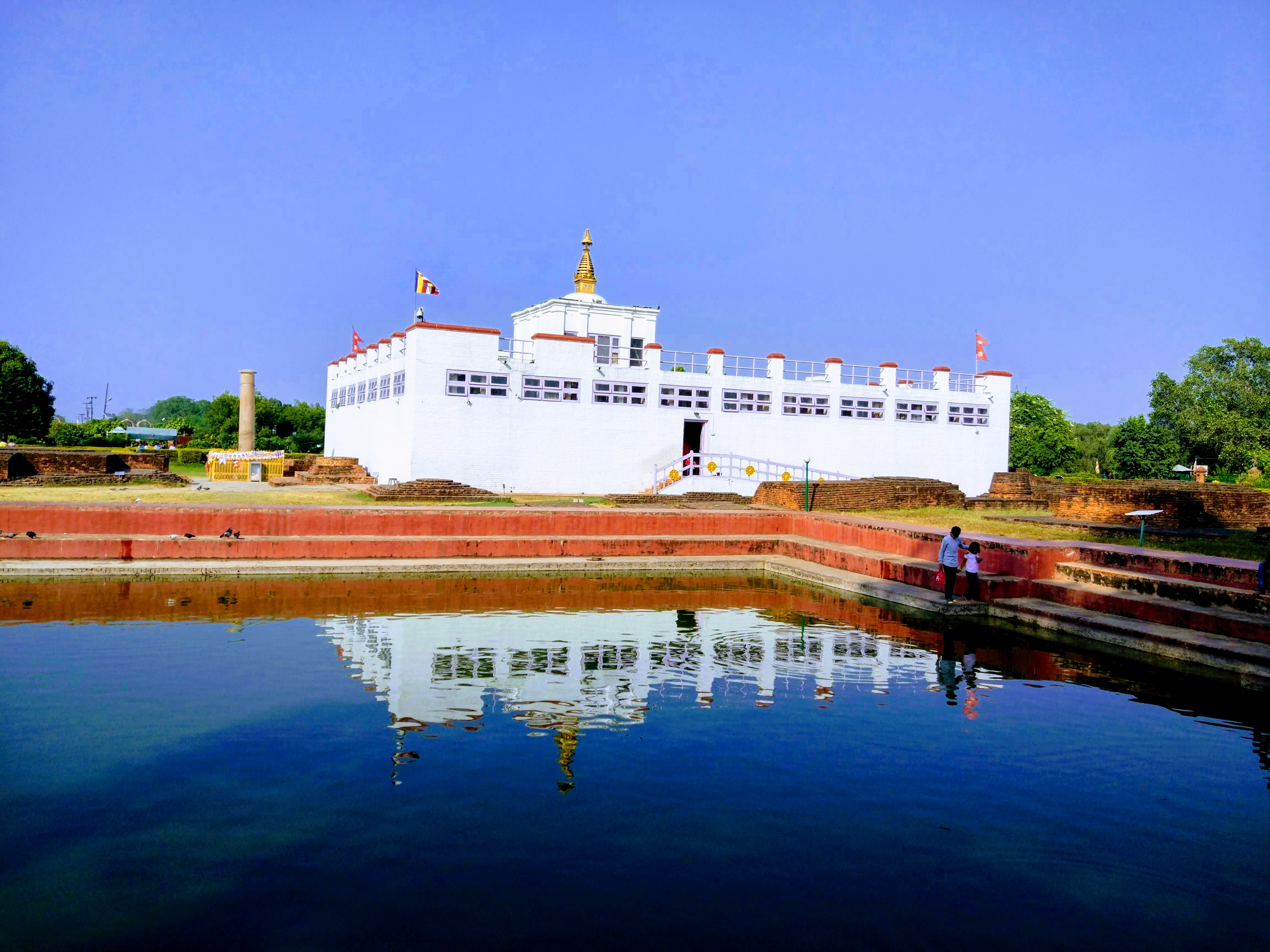
Sacred Pond adjacent to Temple

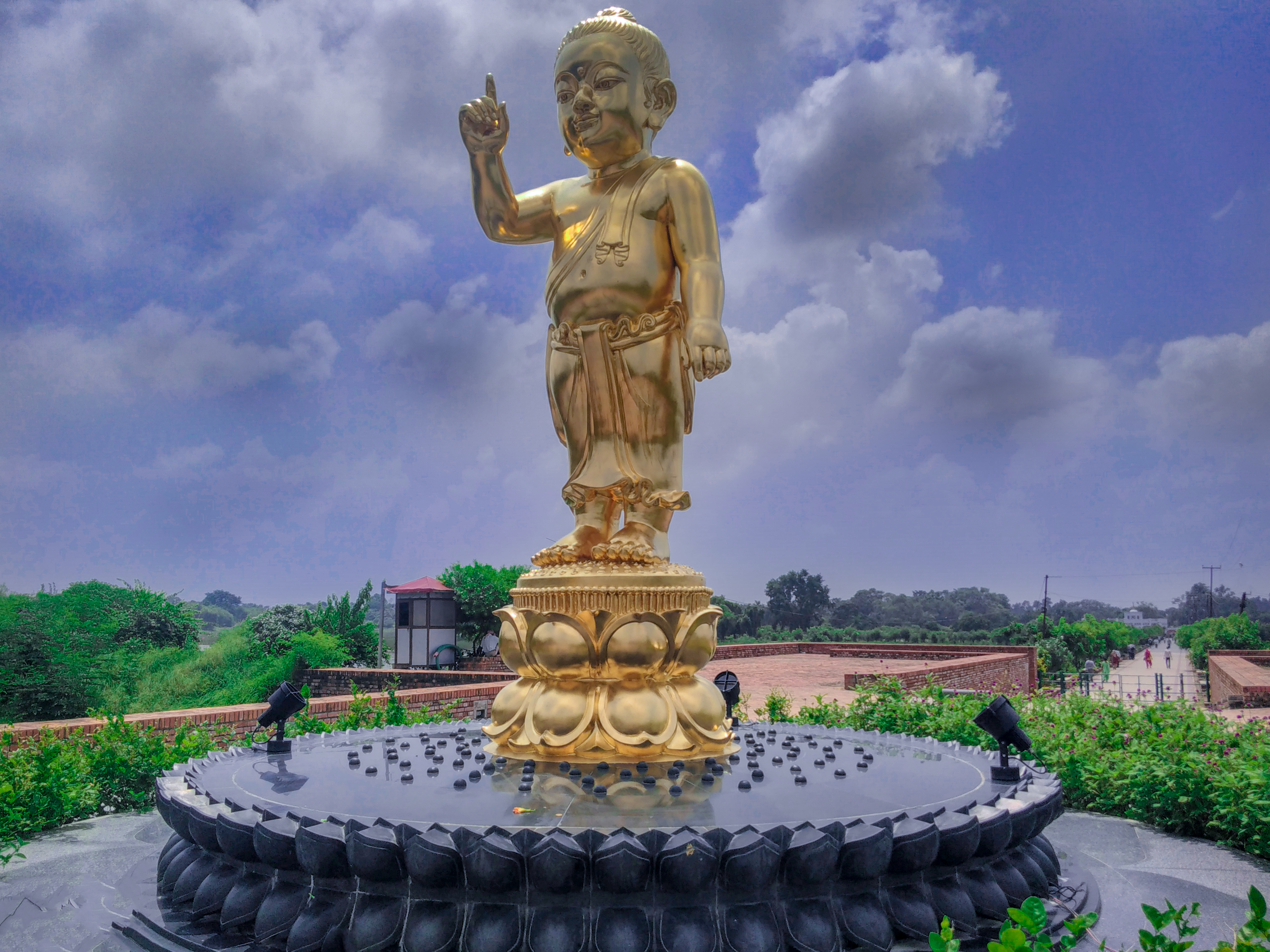
Little Buddha Statue

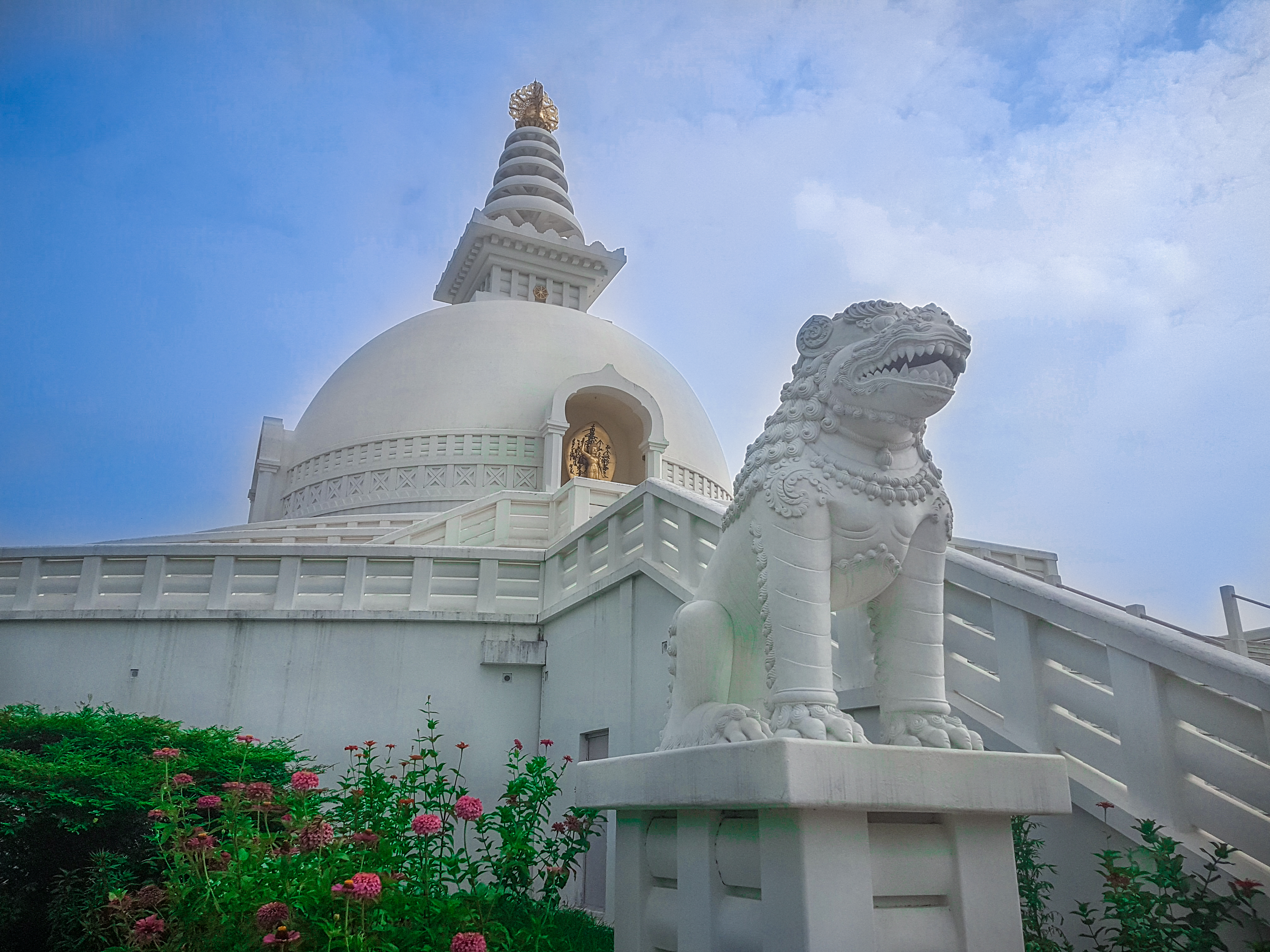
World Peace Stupa gate

=== Kapilvastu ===
Widely attributed as the hometown of Gautama Buddha, the Kapilvastu District of present-day Nepal has more than 130 archaeological sites, primarily concentrated in Tilaurakot, Kudan, Gotihawa, Niglihawa, Araurakot, Sagarhawa and Sisaniya. The region is also considered the hometown of two previous Buddhas before Gautama: Kakusandha Buddha who was born in Gotihawa and Koṇāgamana Buddha who was born in Niglihawa. Among three Ashoka pillars in Nepal, two are situated in Gotihawa and Niglihawa erected during King Ashoka's visit to ancient Kapilvastu. Tilaurakot, considered the cardinal point of the ancient Shakyan city of Kapilavastu where Gautama Buddha spent 29 years of his lifetime, was added to the World Heritage Tentative List by UNESCO in 1996.

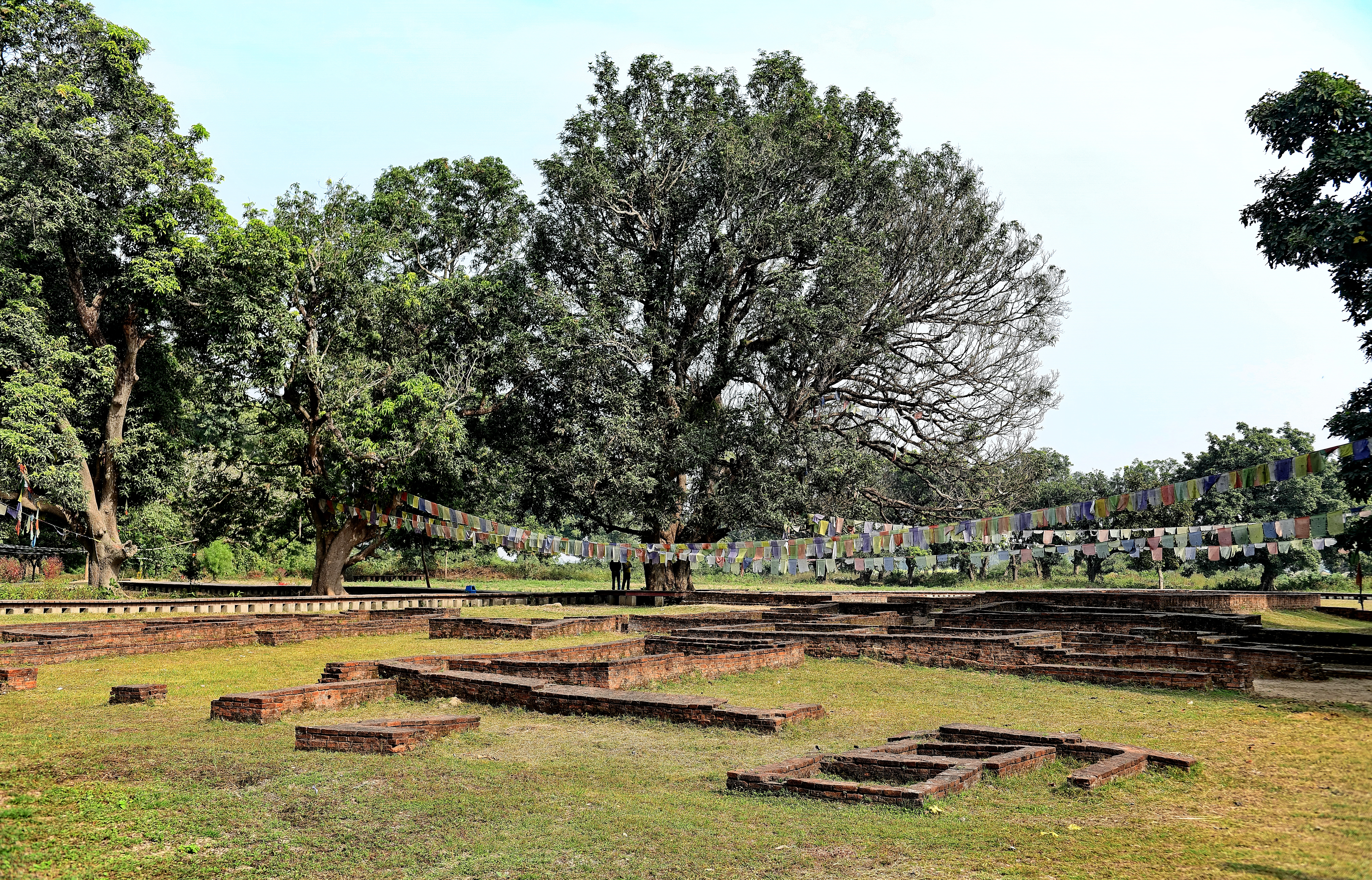
Ruins of ancient Kapilavastu at Tilaurakot

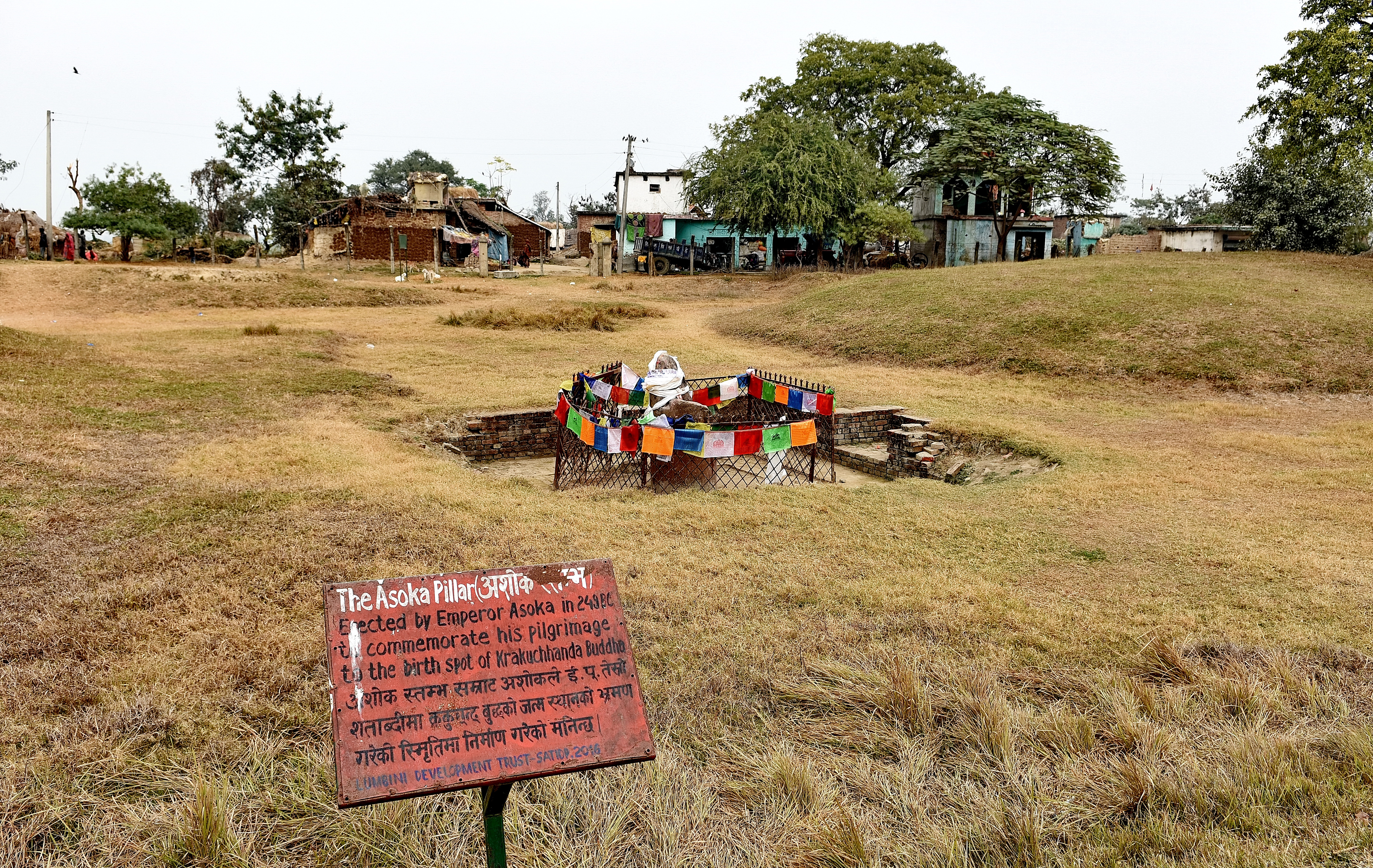
Kakusandha Buddha Ashoka Pillar

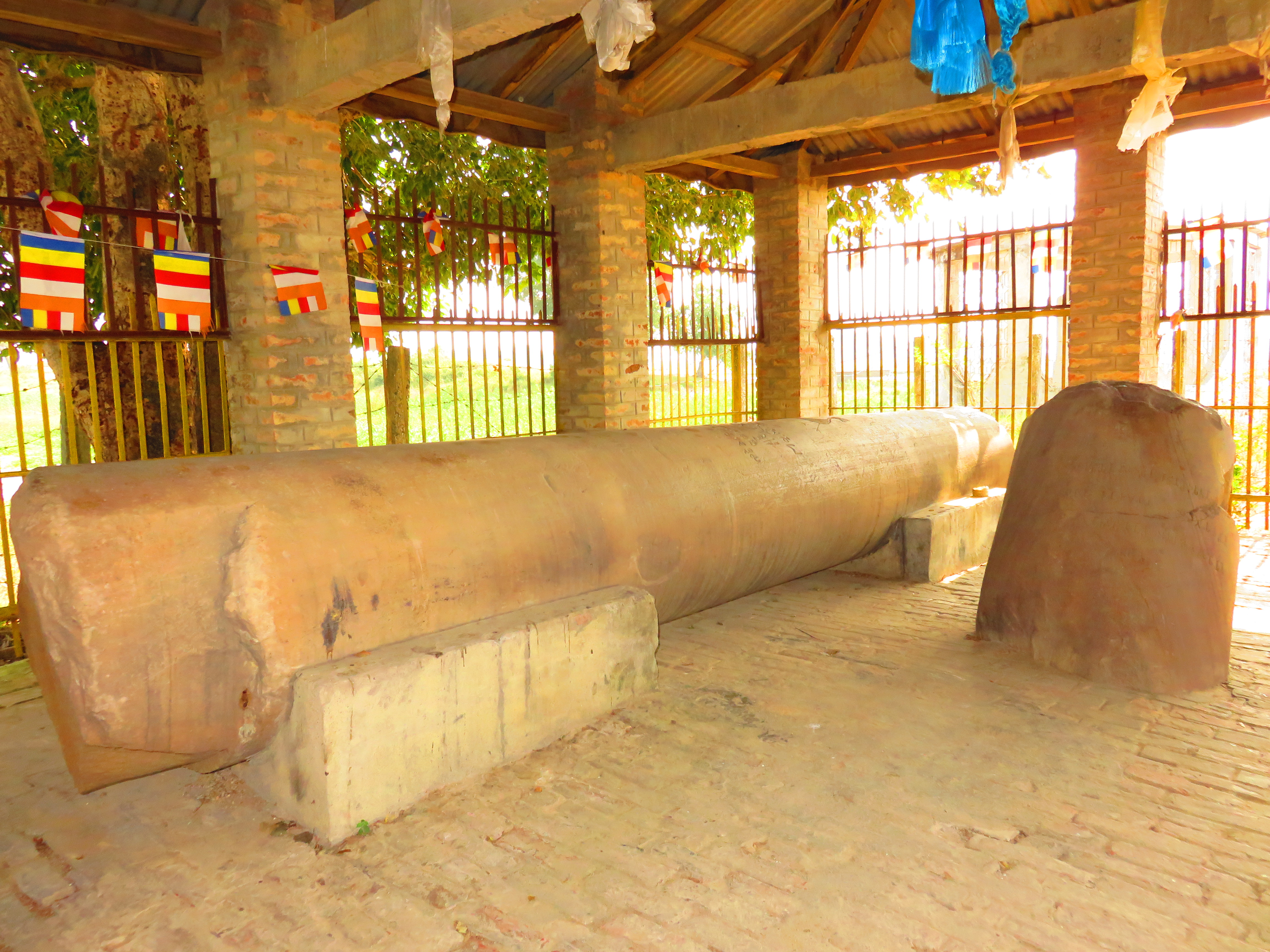
Koṇāgamana Buddha Ashoka Pillar

=== Kudan ===
Kudan is another key historical site related to Buddha's life, where he reunited with his family after attaining enlightenment.

=== Ramagrama ===
After the death of Gautama Buddha, his relics were divided among eight princes out of sixteen mahājanapadās. A Koliyan king of Rāmagrāma (present Parasi district), built a stupa enshrining one relic. Known as the only undisturbed original relic of Buddha in the world, the site of stupa was added to the World Heritage Tentative List by UNESCO on 23 May 1996.

=== Dhaulagiri circuit ===
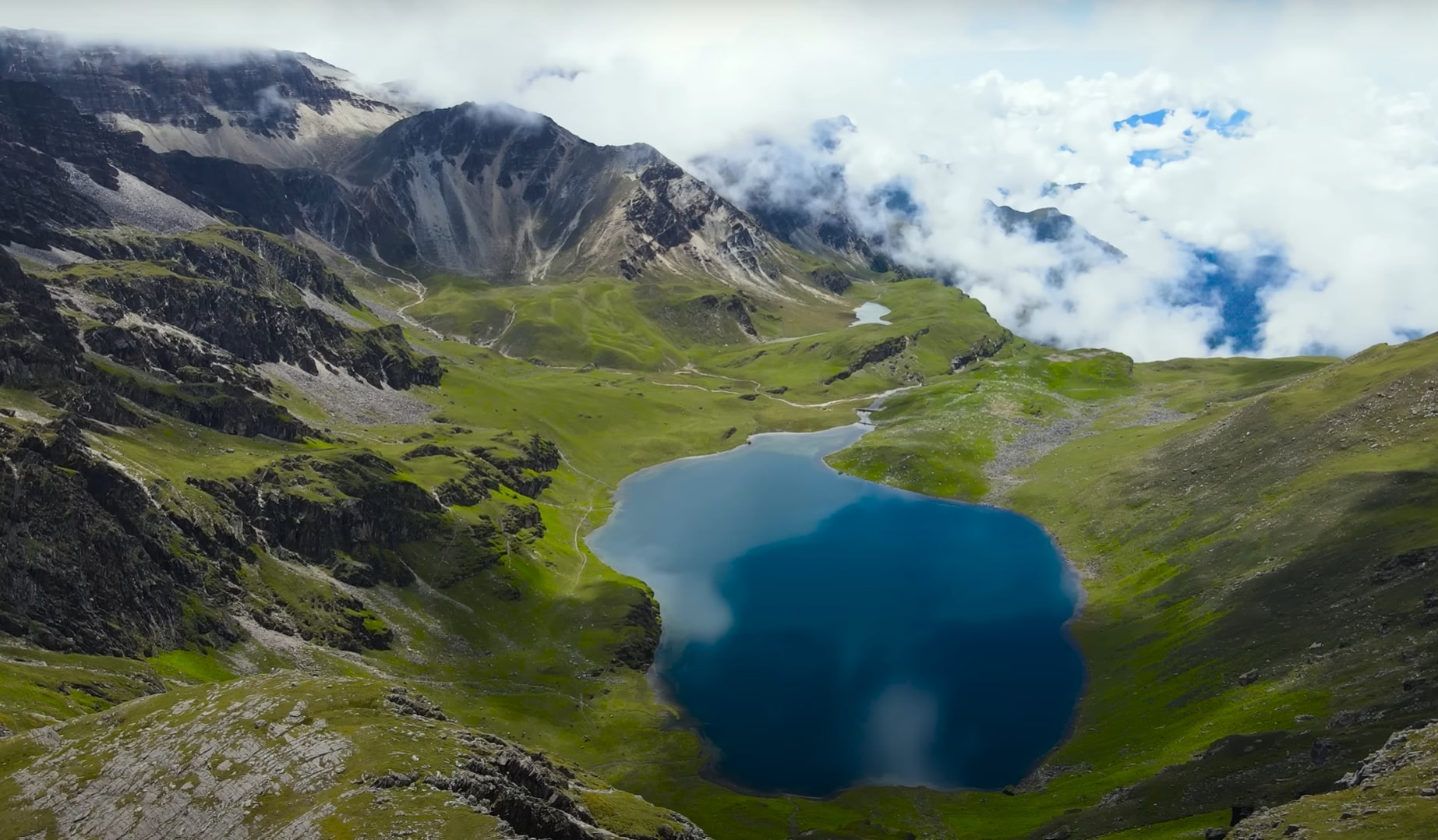
Lower Himalayan lake, known as Sun Daha, in Eastern Rukum

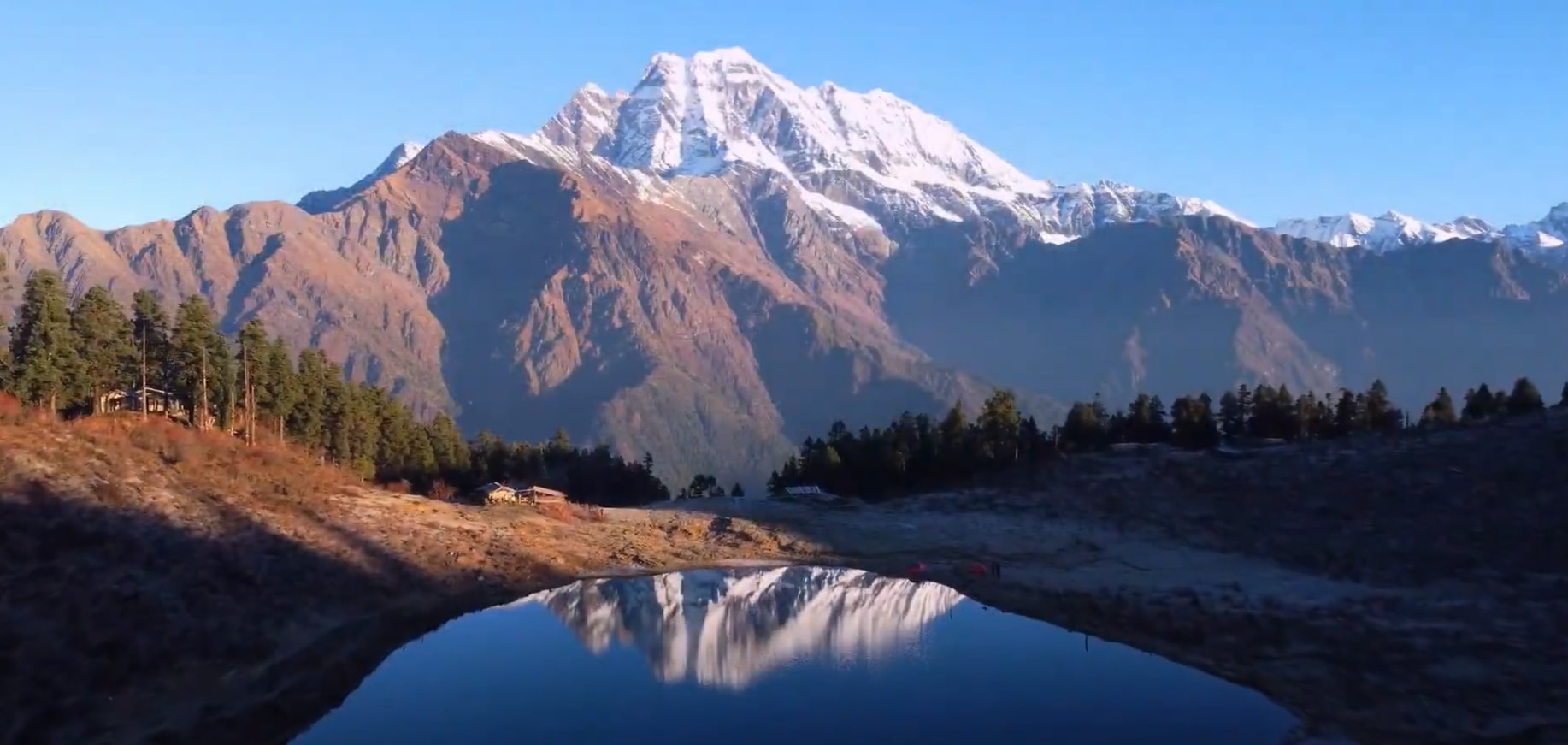
Mount Sisne (Eastern Rukum) along the mountain range

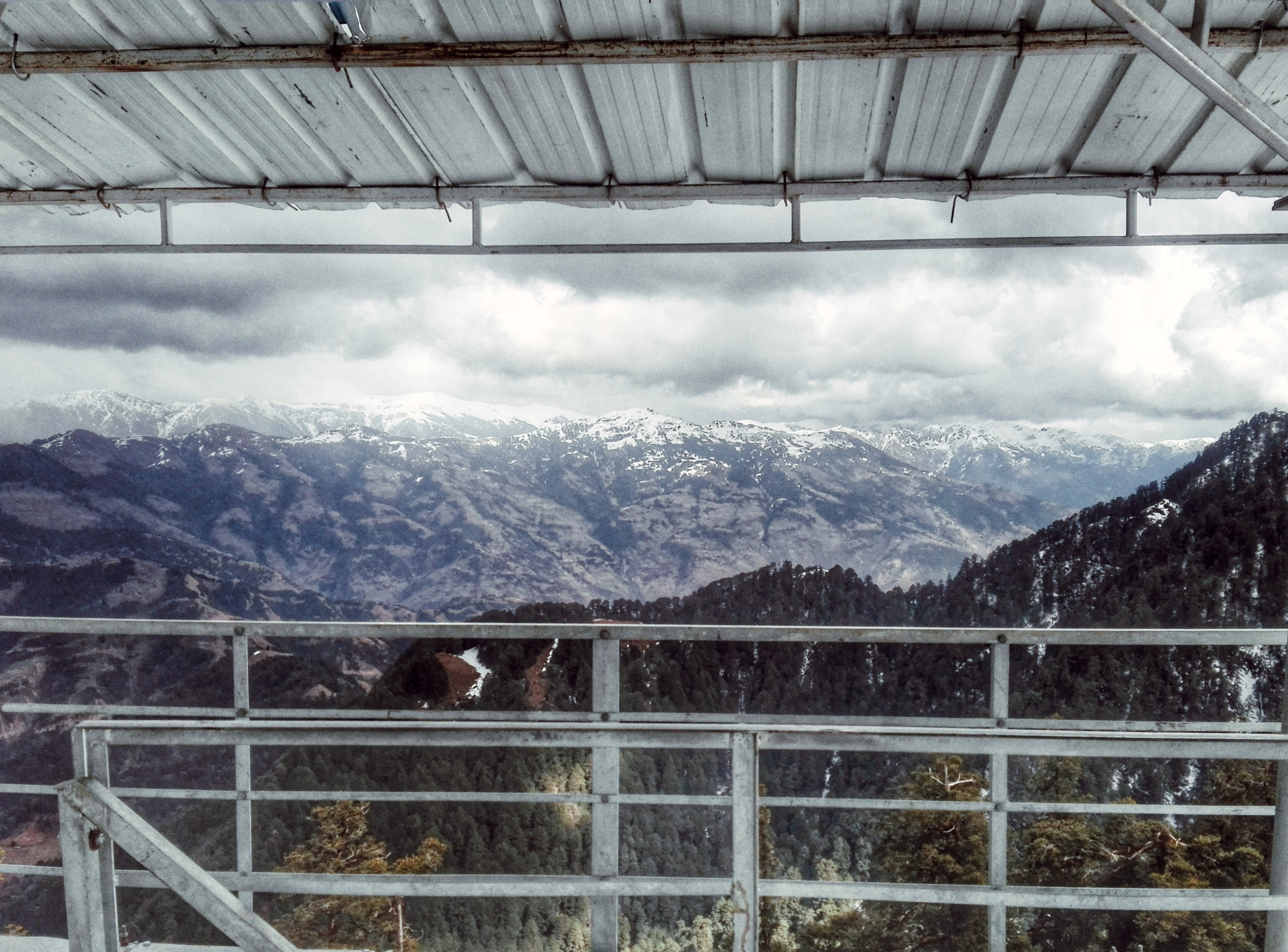
Hills and Himalayas of Northern Lumbini Province

The Dhaulagiri circuit in Eastern Rukum encompasses the Dhaulagiri mountain range of the northern Lumbini Province. The Dhaulagiri mountain range extends from the northwest to the northeast of Eastern Rukum district and then continues eastward to its tallest peak at Dhaulagiri I. Putha Hiunchuli (Dhaulagiri VII), one of the most popular 7,000-metre mountains, was first climbed by British explorer J. O. M. Roberts and Sherpa Ang Nyima in 1954.

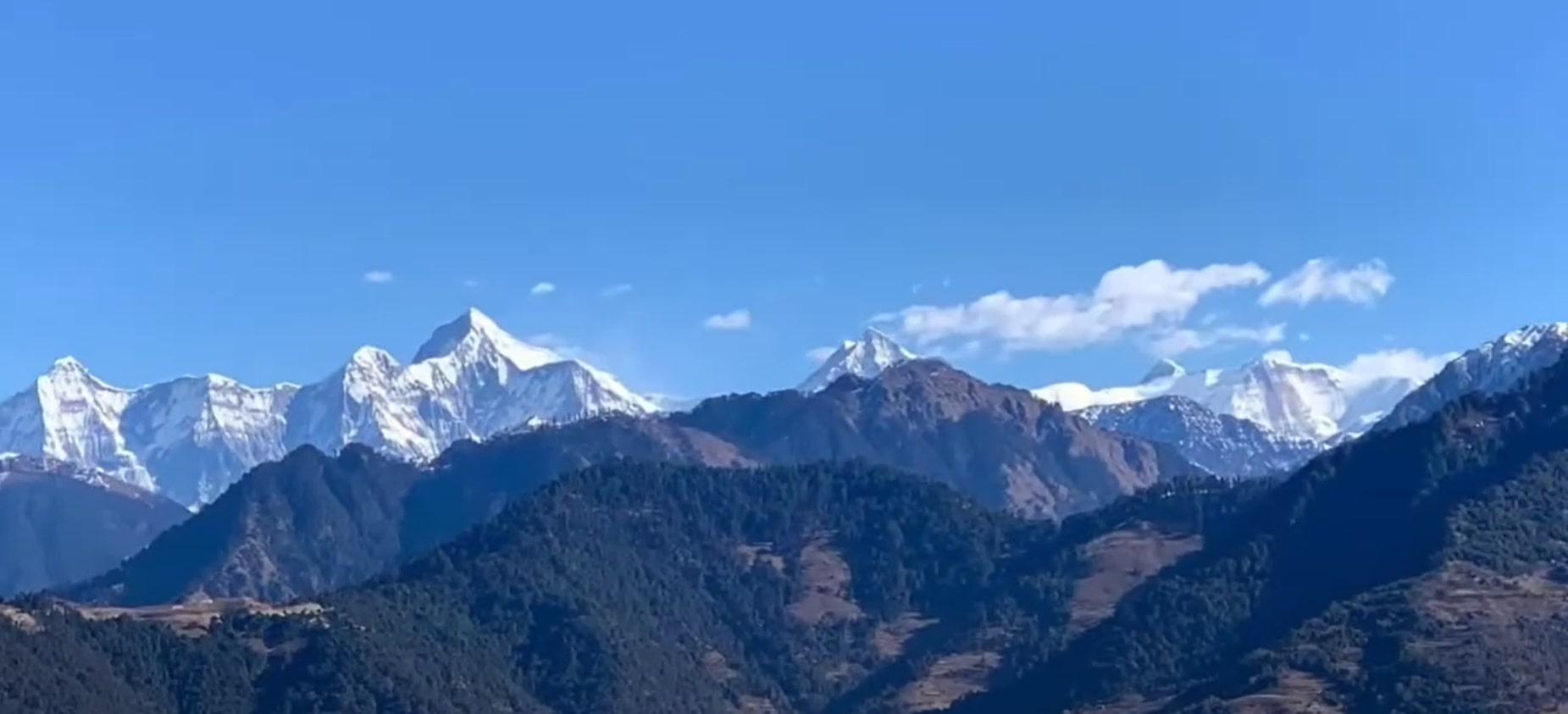
Dhaulagiri Mountain Range in Eastern Rukum features some of the most popular 7,000-meter mountains of the Himalayas

The West Dhaulagiri circuit is a tourist trekking circuit close to the Dhaulagiri mountain range and Magar-majority villages, with a distinct preserved Kham Magar culture of the northern Lumbini province. The circuit's eastern portion is situated along the Dhorpatan reserve of Eastern Rukum, which was designated to preserve high-altitude ecosystems in western Nepal in 1983. The reserve harbours alpine, sub-alpine and high temperate vegetation and 137 species of birds. Endangered animals in the reserve include the musk deer, wolf, red panda, cheer pheasant and danphe.

=== National Parks ===
Bardiya National Park is the largest national park in the lowland Terai, covering 968 square kilometres. It was established in 1976 to protect the representative ecosystem, habitats of tigers and their prey species. As a beautiful, unspoiled wilderness of sal forest, grassland, and alluvial washes cut by the many fingers of the Karnali River, it is a popular tourist destination, offering elephant rides and wilderness sight-seeing of Gangetic dolphins, tigers, rhinos and elephants.

In 1997, a buffer zone of 327 square kilometres surrounding the park was declared, consisting of forests and private lands. The buffer zone is jointly managed by the local communities and the park and community development and resource management is carried out jointly.

The Babai valley, which is rich in biodiversity, was added to the park in 1984. The zone has wooded grassland and riverine forest and its water is home to Gharial crocodile. More than 30 different mammals, 513 species of birds and several species of snakes, lizard and fishes have been recorded in the park area.

A tiger monitoring study conducted (July 2016) in Bardiya National Park in Nepal's Terai Arc Landscape has estimated 56 wild tigers, an increase of six from the 2013 estimate for the national park. —WWF

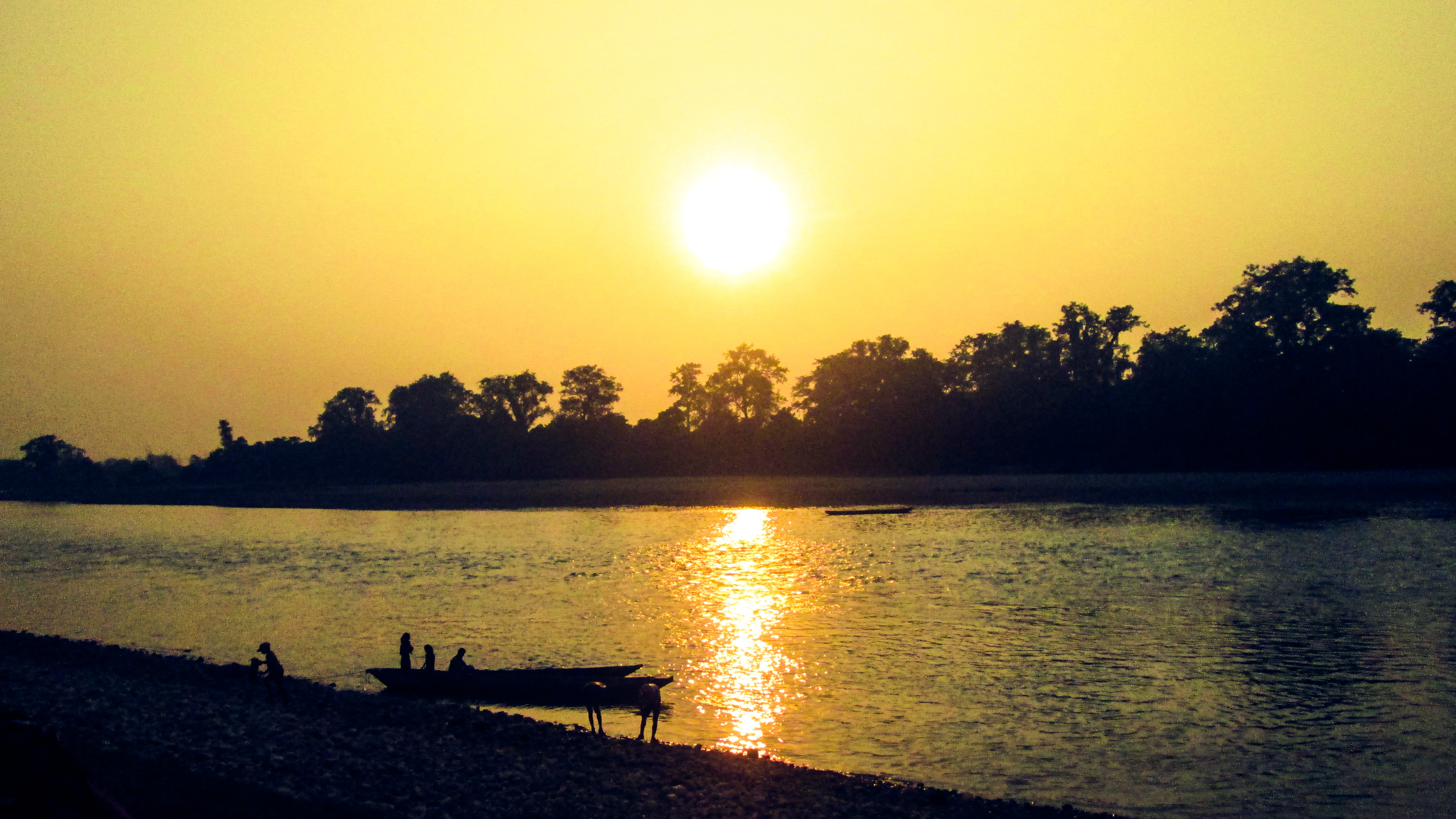
Sunset at Bardiya National Park

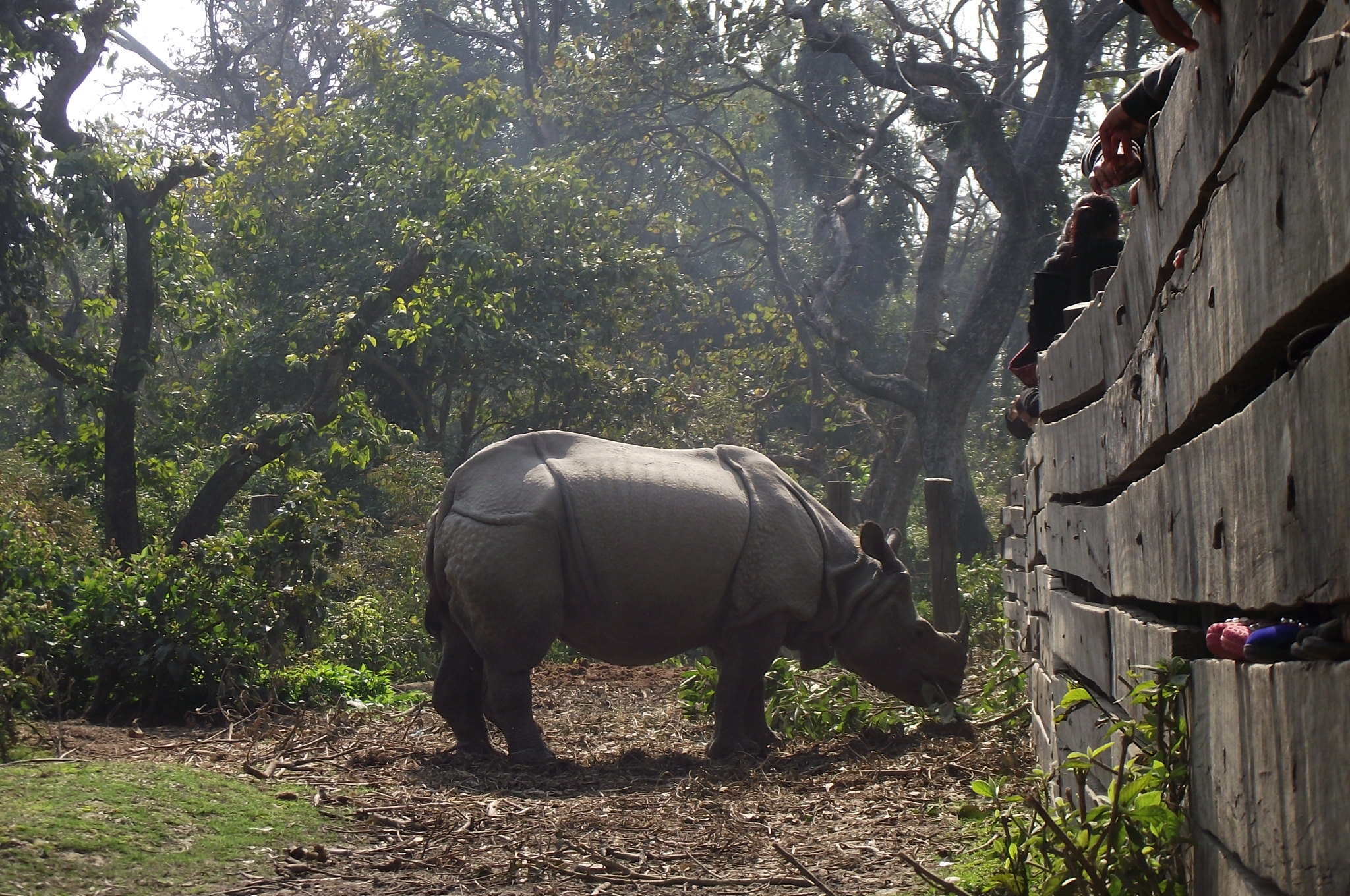
One horned Rhino, Bardiya National Park

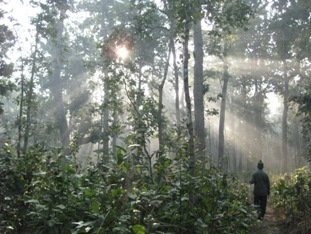
Forest trees of Bardiya National Park

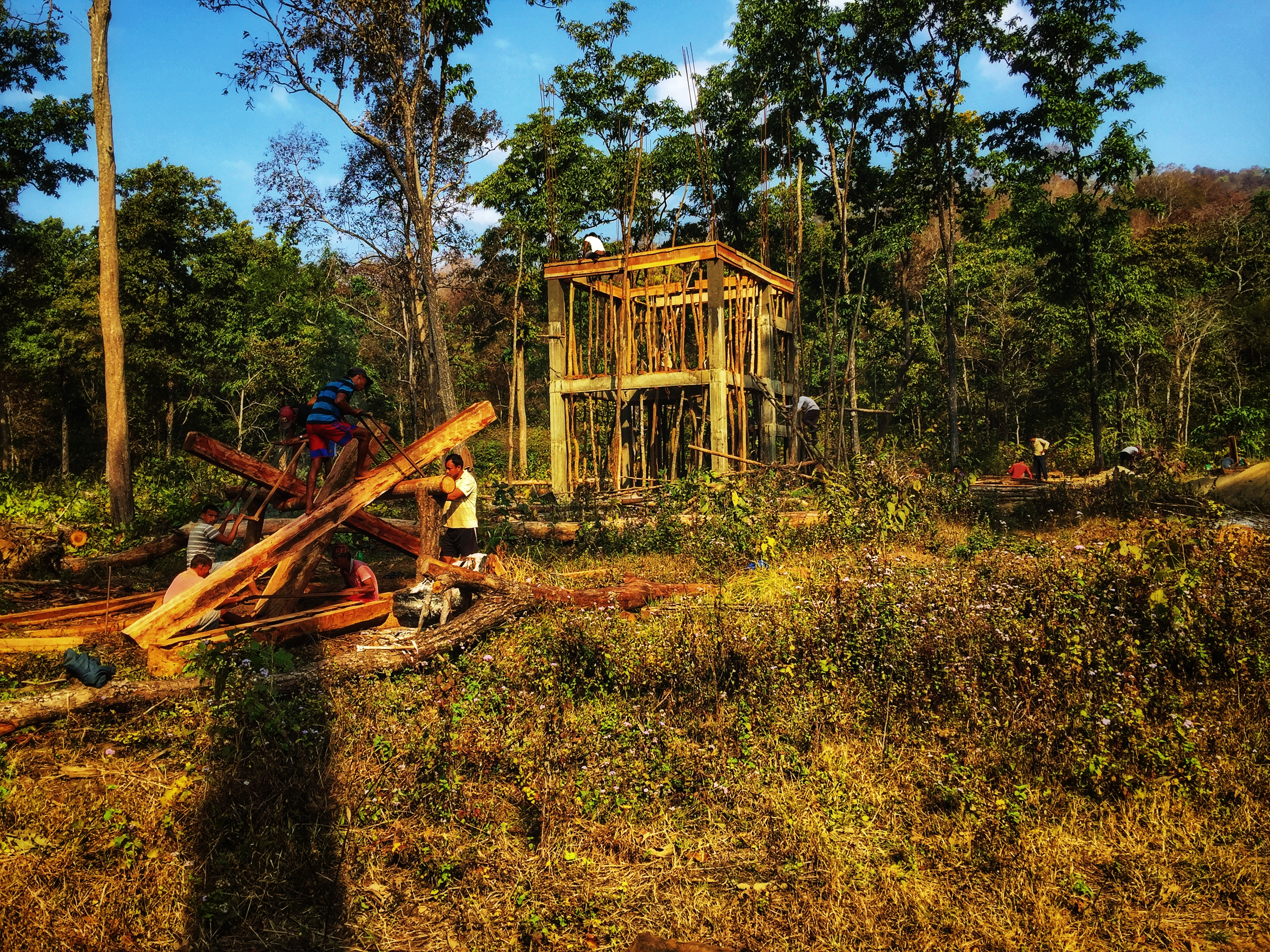
Banke National Park

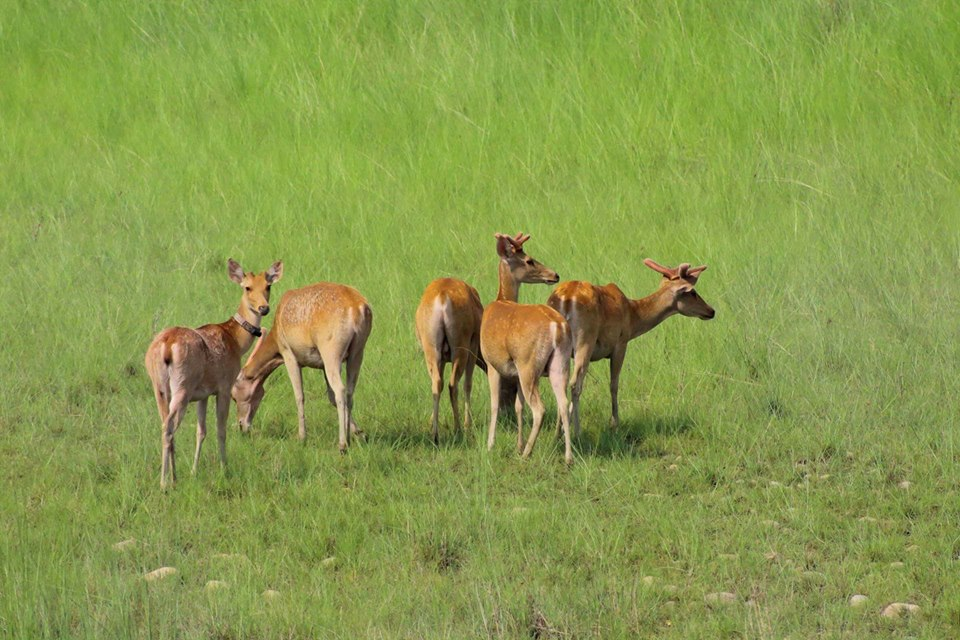
Deers at Bardiya National Park

Banke National Park, adjacent to the Bardiya National Park with the coherent protected area of 1,518 km^{2} (586 sq mi), represents the Tiger Conservation Unit (TCU). The national park was established in 2010 and is a protected area of tiger and four-horned antelopes. The park extends over 550 square kilometers in Banke district of the province. Banke National Park is connected with Bardiya National Park in the west and wildlife sanctuary and forests of India in the south. The protected zone is an important component of Terai Arc Landscape (TAL) that provides habitat for tigers. The park has eight ecosystem types: Sal forest, deciduous Riverine forest, savannahs and grasslands, mixed hardwood forest, flood plain community, Bhabar and foothills of Chure range. It is home to 124 plants, 34 mammals, more than 300 birds, 24 reptiles, 7 amphibians and 58 fish species. Under the National Parks and Wildlife Conservation Act 1973, 3 species of mammals (tiger, striped hyaena, four-horned antelope), 4 species of birds (giant hornbill, black stork, Bengal florican, and lesser florican) and 2 species of reptiles (gharial crocodile and python) are protected in the park.

=== Cultural Heritage ===
Religious sites

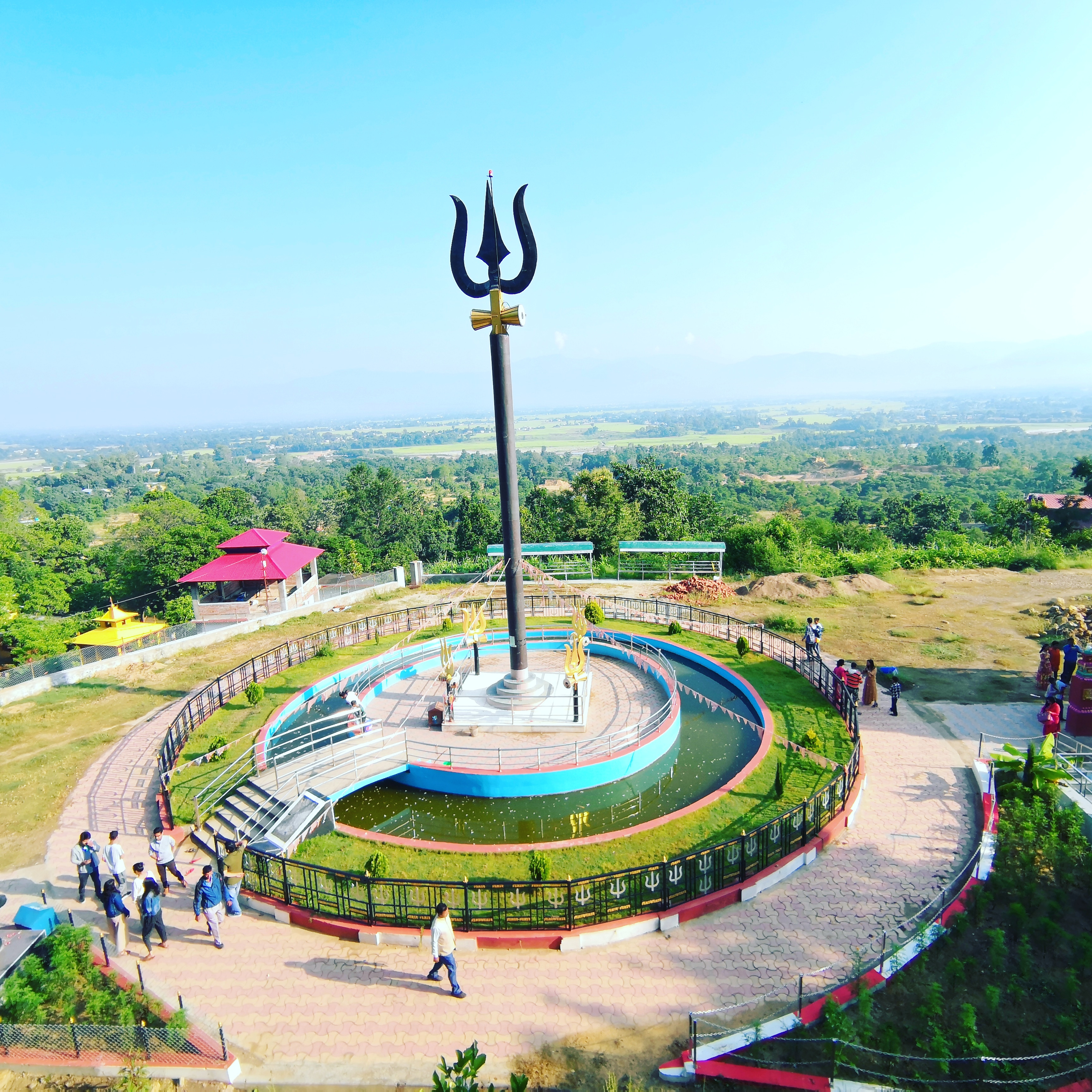
World's largest trident (Trishula) in Dang valley believed to be where five Pandavas brother prayed to Lord Shiva

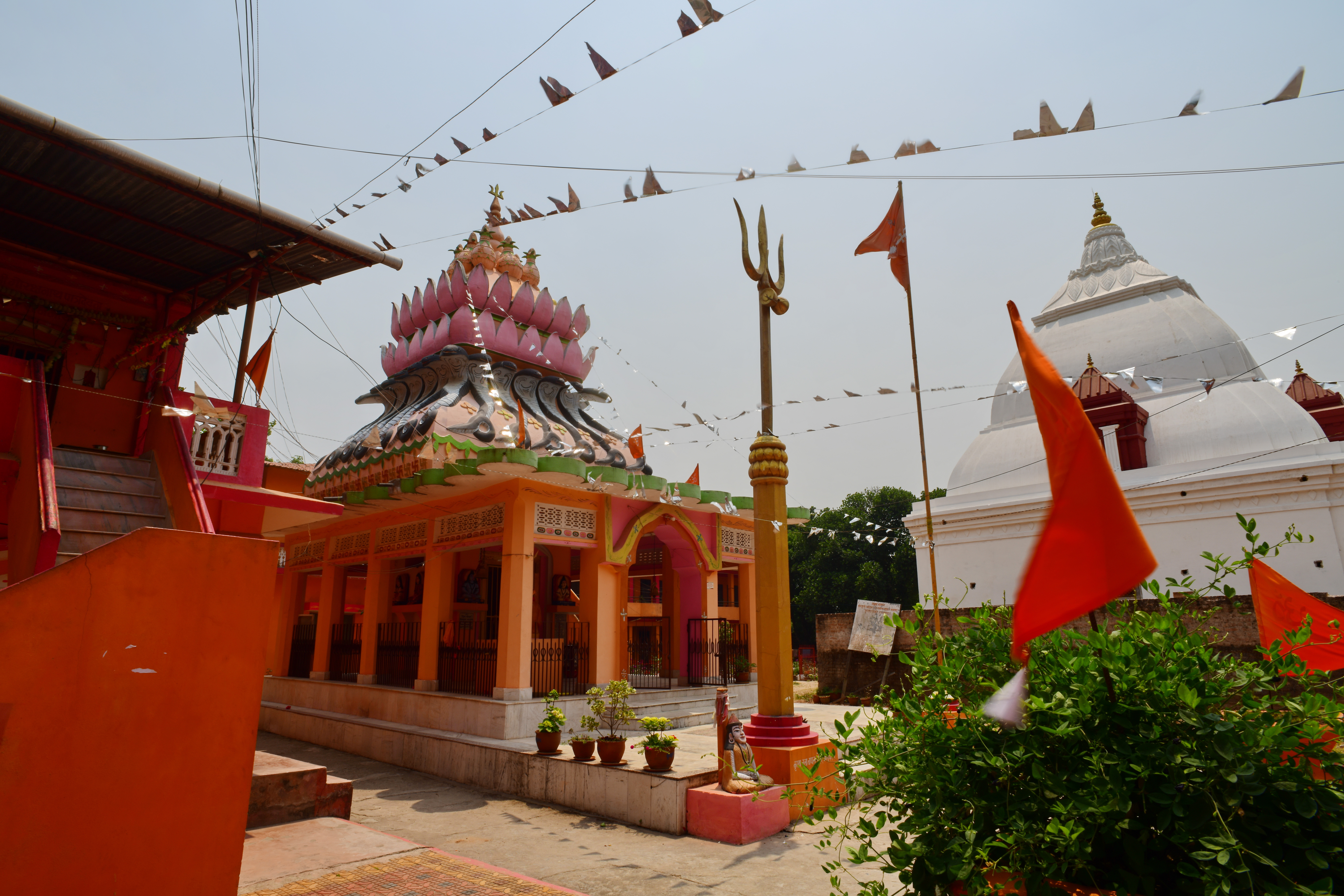
Ancient Gorakhnath Temple in Dang district

The culture of the province has been shaped by multi-religious and multi-ethnic demography as well as the historical development of the Indian sub-continent. Hinduism, the dominant religion of the province and the cultural sacred sites related to it, are prevalent throughout the province. Hinduism flourished overwhelmingly in Dang valley where the cultural centers of the Hindu Nath tradition connected to Yogi Gorakhnath were established long before the creation of modern Nepal. A prominent Gorakhnath temple in Dang district, also known as Ratnanath temple, remained an ancient temple which was respected and protected by the ruling kings of the region throughout - including the later kings of the Shah dynasty.

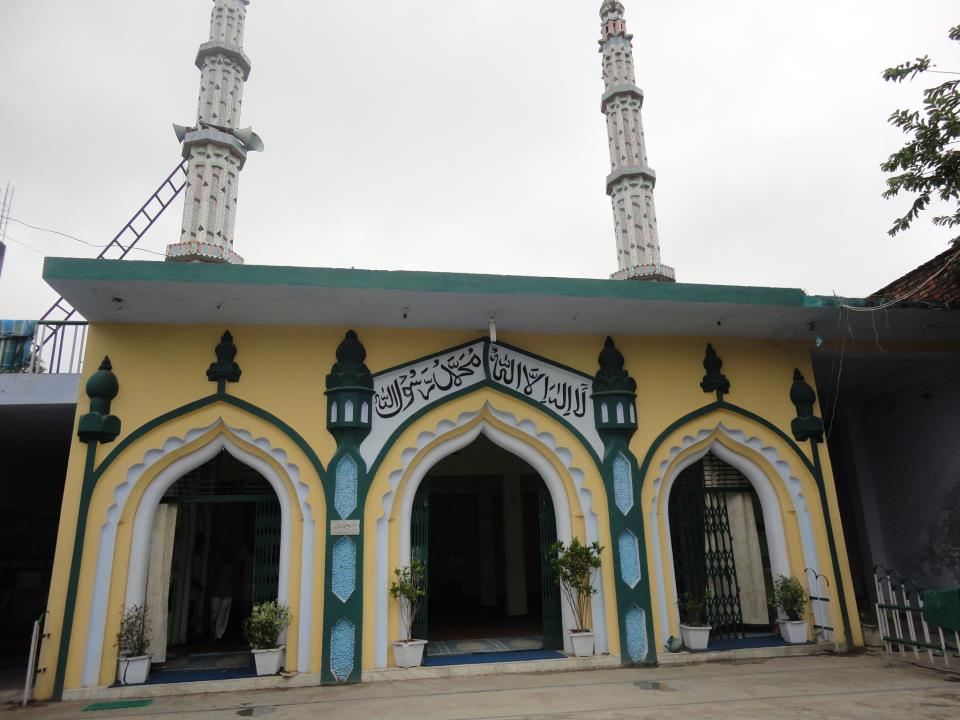
Jama Masjid Rahmaniya, one of the oldest mosque of Nepal

Further popular Hindu sites in Dang district include Ambikeshwori Temple with a deity of Shiva and Goddess Sati Devi; and Pandaveswor temple which has the world's largest trident and believed to be where the five Pandavas brother prayed to Lord Shiva. Other prominent temples of the province include Bhairabsthan Temple of Palpa where Lord Bhairava is worshipped as a deity and Swargadwari temple of Pyuthan which has the deities of Shiva and Vishnu.

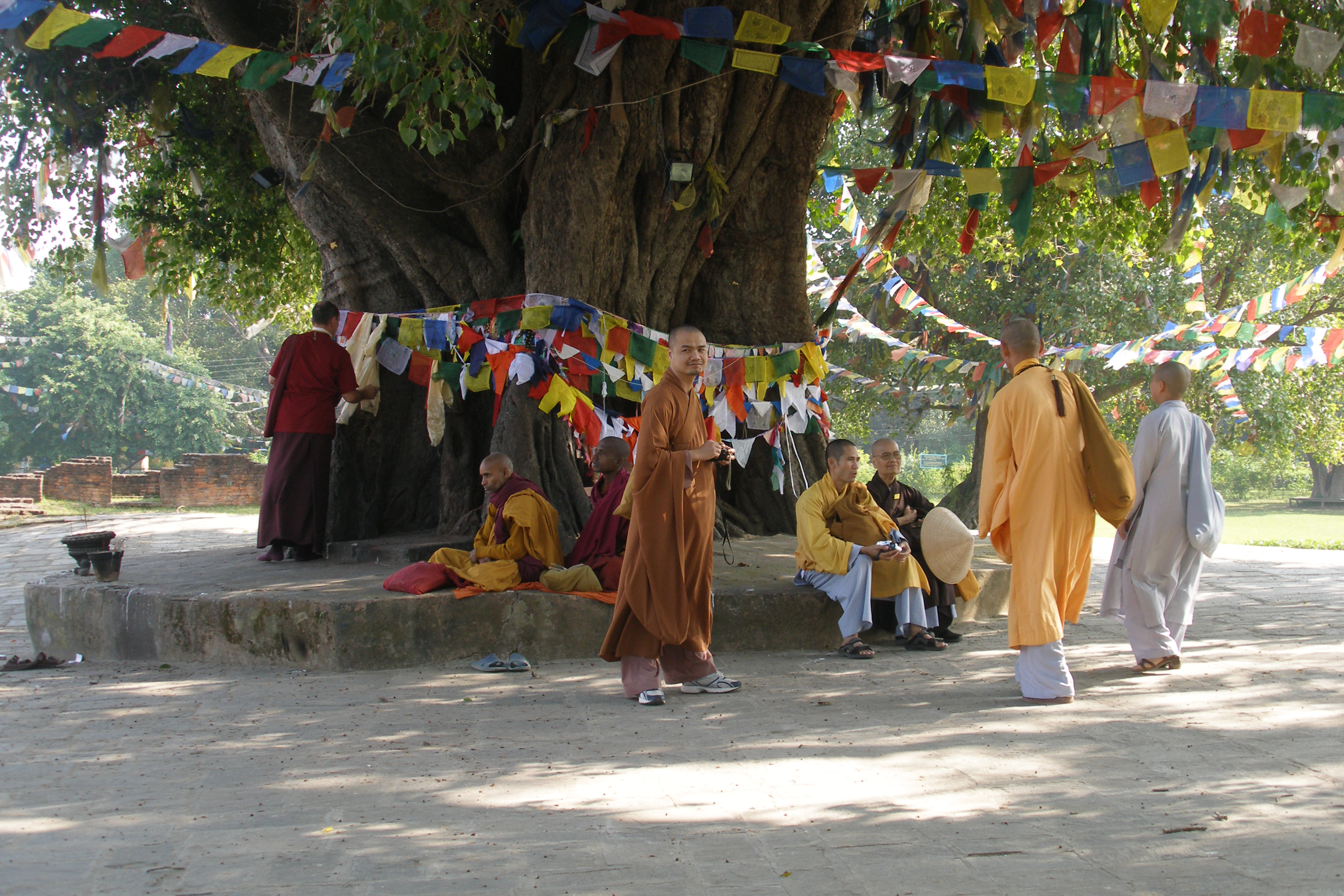
Buddhist pilgrims resting on a tree in Lumbini

Islam, the second-most followed religion of the province, is mostly distributed in the southern districts bordering India. Kapilvastu and Banke districts have one of the largest Muslim population of Nepal and along with Rupandehi, constitute almost half of all the Muslims in Nepal. One of the oldest mosque of Nepal established in 1950 AD, Jama Masjid Rahmaniya, is situated in Rupandehi District.

Within and around Lumbini, sacred sites related to the birth and childhood of Gautama Buddha are pilgrimage centers for Buddhists throughout the world. Lumbini Development Trust, an autonomous and non-profit organization manages the Buddhist sites in Lumbini and the master plan is initiated together with the United Nations to ensure long-term safeguarding of the archeological sites of global importance.

Rani Mahal

After being forced to drop his royal titles, General Khadga Shumsher was sent to Palpa as a Commander in Chief of Nepal where his beloved youngest wife, Rani Tej Kumari Devi, died. The General constructed a grand palace and named it after his wife as Rani Mahal ("Queen's Palace") in 1893 AD. He also named the nearby forest around the palace as Rani ban ("Queen's forest"). The palace is at the banks of the Kali Gandaki River.

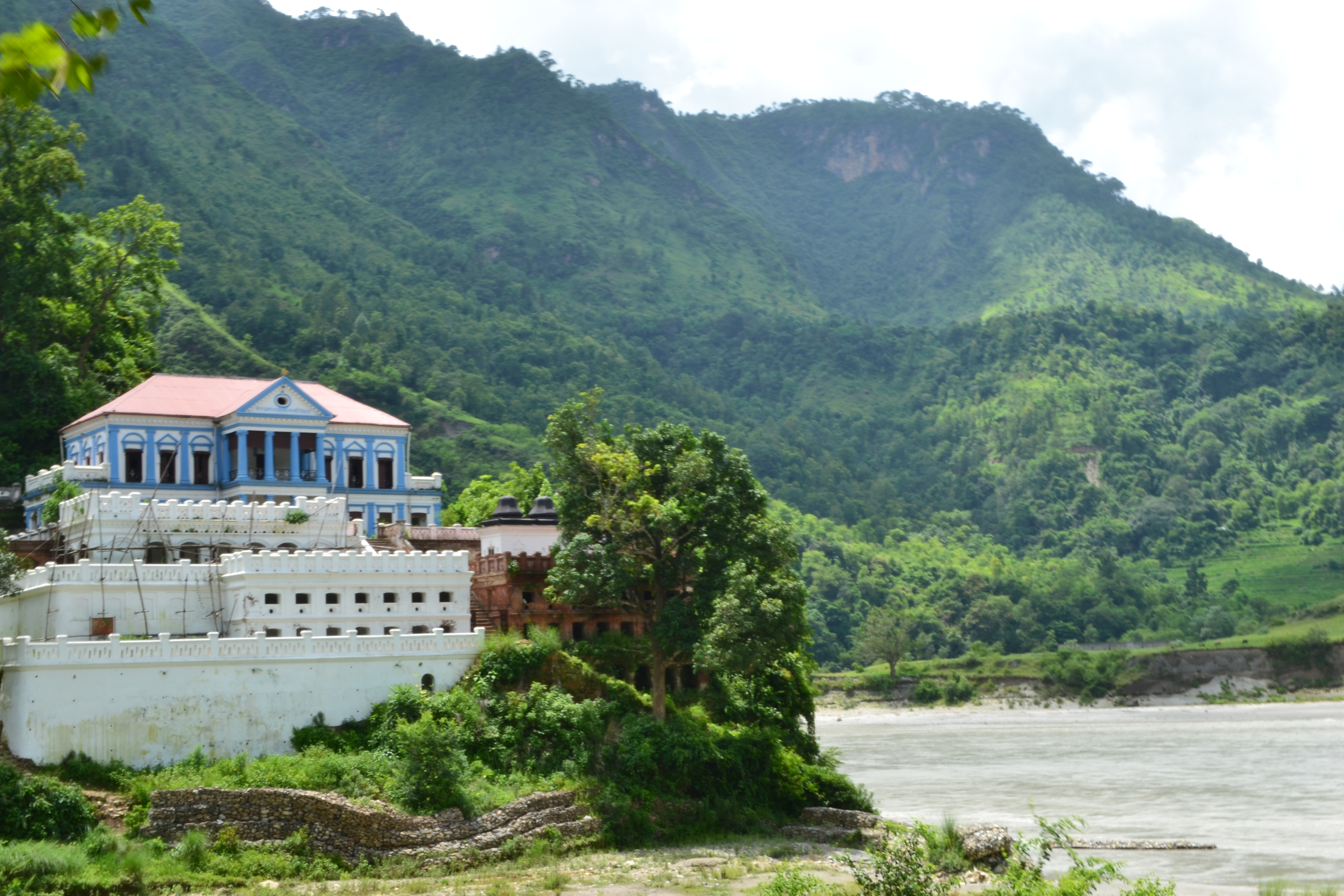
Rani Mahal at Palpa

Supa Deurali Temple

Supa Deurali Temple in Arghakhanchi

Supa Deurali Temple is a Hindu temple located in Sandhikharka municipality, Arghakhanchi district of Nepal. It lies at an altitude of about 4,500 feet. Supadevi is considered to fulfill the wishes of devotees. In addition to goddess Bhagavati, there are idols of Ganesh, Mahakali, Mahalaxmi and Shiva in the temple. The donation received from the devotee is used to run two local schools.

== Infrastructure ==
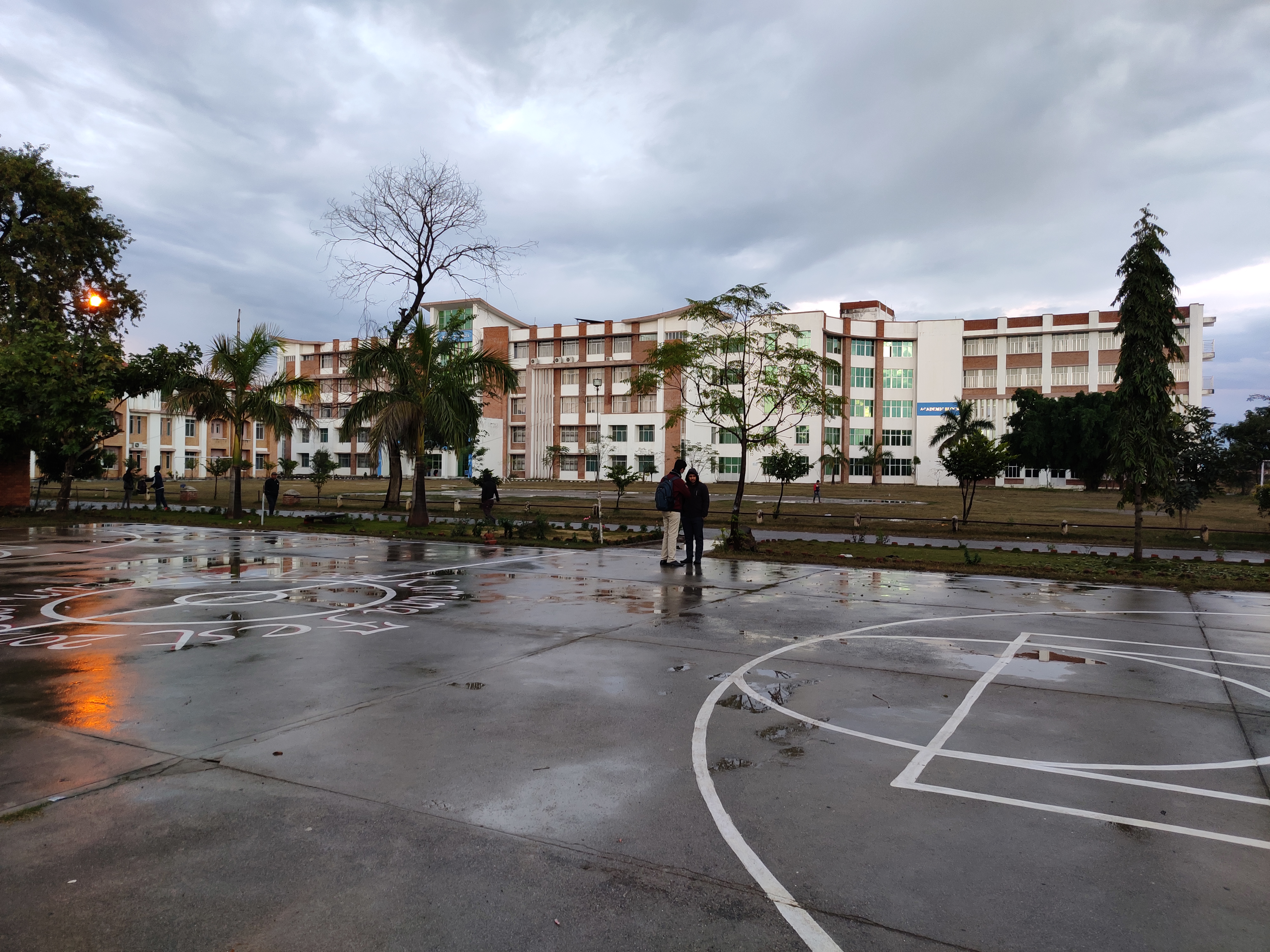
Universal College of Medical Sciences, Siddharthanagar

=== Education ===
As per the 2021 census, Lumbini's literacy rate was above the national average at 78.1%, the national average being 76.2%. The breakdown of the data showed that the male literacy stood at 85.2% while female literacy stood at 71.7% in the province. District-wise, Palpa and Dang were the best performers with literacy rate of 83.7% and 81.4% respectively, followed by Rupandehi at 81.2%. Nationally, Palpa was also among the top five districts of Nepal with highest literacy rate alongside Kathmandu, Lalitpur, Bhaktapur and Kaski.

By 2014, Palpa District was one of the first 4 "fully literate" districts of Nepal, achieving a literacy rate of over 95%. By 2018, further districts of Lumbini province namely, Arghakhanchi, Gulmi, Pyuthan, Dang, Parasi, Rupandehi, Rolpa, Bardiya and Eastern Rukum District were classified as fully literate districts of Nepal.

Universities

- Nepal Sanskrit University
- Rapti Academy of Health Sciences
- Lumbini Bauddha University

=== Health ===
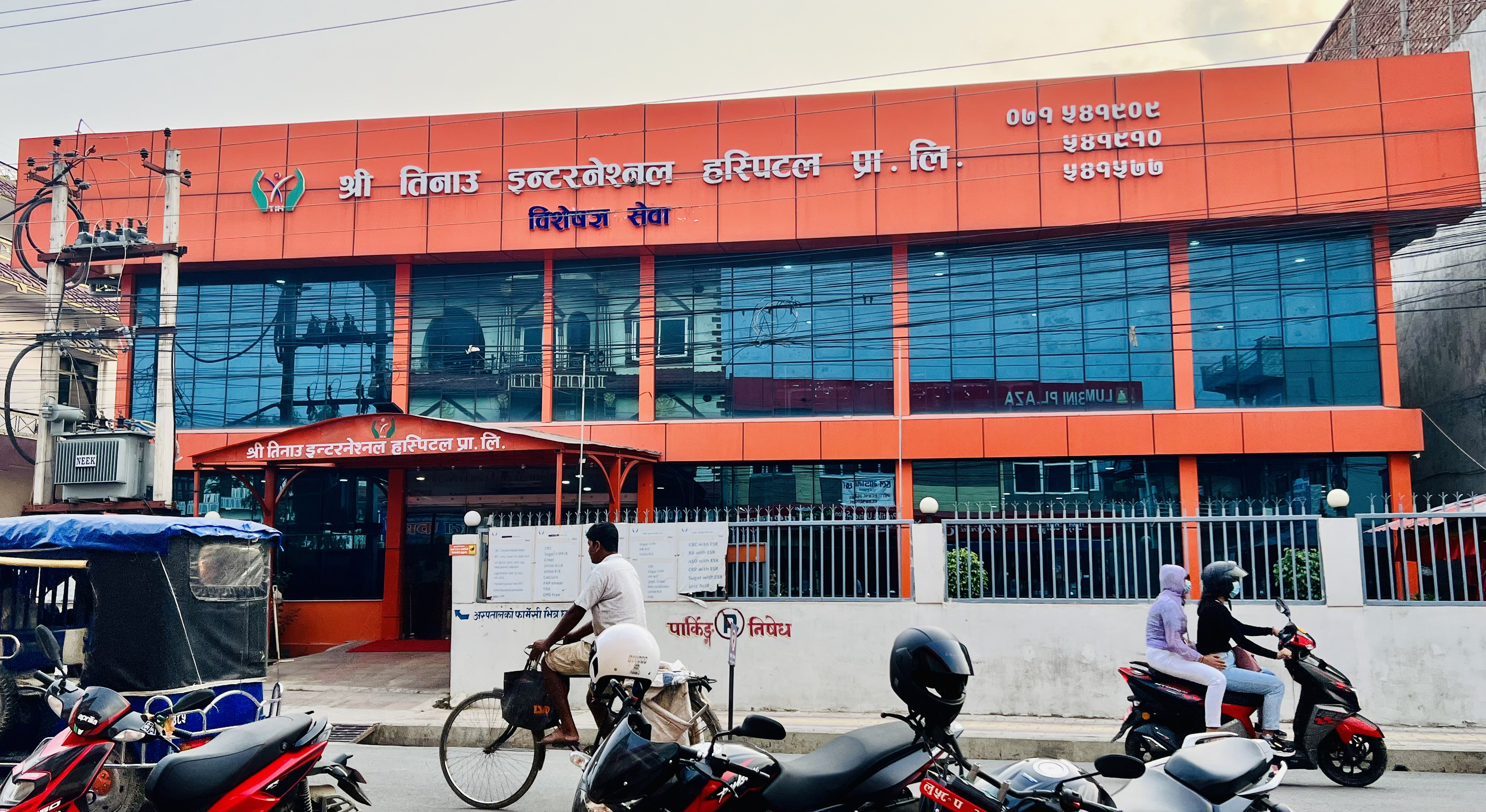
Tinau International Hospital in Butwal

According to the National Demographic Health Survey (NDHS) 2016, the Province's Neonatal Mortality (per 1000 live births) stands at 30 and Infant mortality rate (per 1000 live births) stands at 42, both of which are higher than the national average of 21 and 32 respectively. The province has 670 public health facilities, including four hub hospitals, 18 hospitals, two regional medical stores, 31 primary health care centers, 570 health posts, 27 urban health centers, 15 community health units and 9 other health facilities.

=== Communication ===
In Lumbini province, 49.2% of the population have radio access and followed by 30.4% have access to TV, and only 39.7% have access to the internet. Similarly, 4.4% of the population have access to landline telephone, while 75.5% have access to mobile phone. There are three major cell phone providers in Lumbini Province. They are Nepal Doorsanchar Company Limited (NTC), Ncell Axiata Limited (NCELL) and Smart Cell. The coverage of Smart Cell providers is only in 5 districts.

There are 66 newspaper channels in Lumbini Province with national, provincial, and local outreach. As per the classification, some of the top-ranking newspapers are Gorachya Dainik, Dainik Nepalgunj, and Mechikali Sandesh Dainik. There are a total of 63 radio stations in the province, such as Radio Lumbini, Radio Tulsipur, Bheri F.M., etc.

=== Energy ===
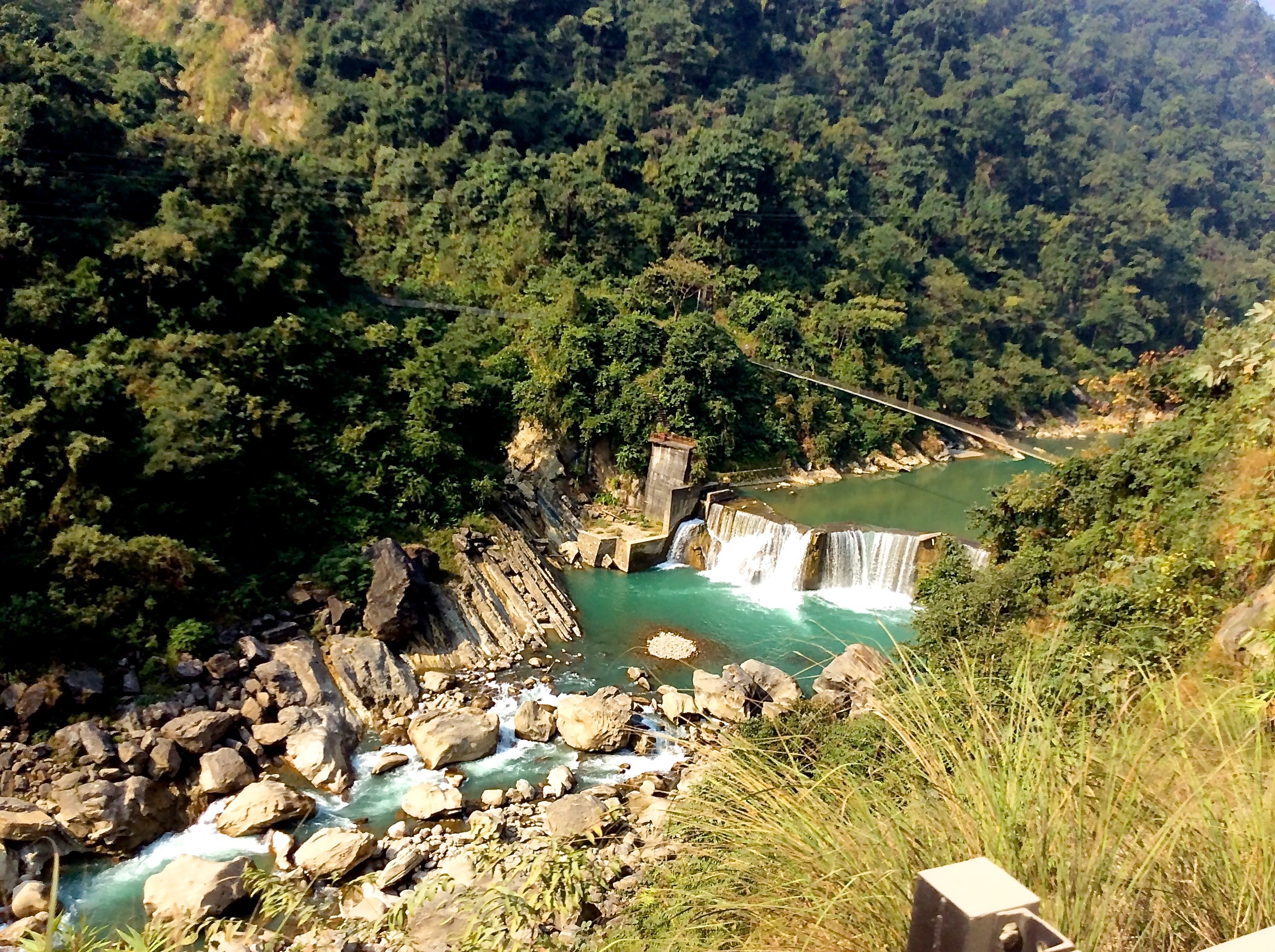
Tinau Hydropower Plant

91% of the population has access to electricity in the province. Of the 12 districts in Lumbini Province, Parasi, Kapilvastu and Bardiya have been electrified by more than 99 percent. Gulmi, Arghakhanchi and Rupandehi have more than 95 percent electrification and Rukum East has the lowest electrification of 11.25 percent. Lumbini generates 21.2 MW of electricity from hydropower. Total number of electricity consumers in the province is 457992, consuming 370.8 Million MWh of energy annually. According to NEA, Distribution and Consumer Service Directorate 93% of consumers are domestic users; loss of electricity in the province is 12.17% for the year 2076/77 (2020 AD). Out of the total loss in distribution provincial office, Gularia contributes the highest loss percentage of 25.02%.

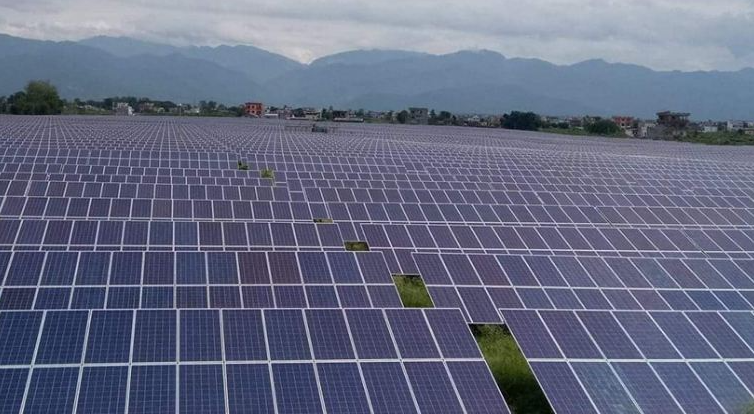
Butwal Solar PV Project

Butwal Solar PV Project, Nepal's first private grid-connected solar power plant, was connected to national transmission line in October 2020. Ridi Hydropower Company has constructed the power plant in Tilottama of Rupendehi District. With over 32,000 solar panels of 330 watts each, the plant can generate 8.5 MW of electricity.

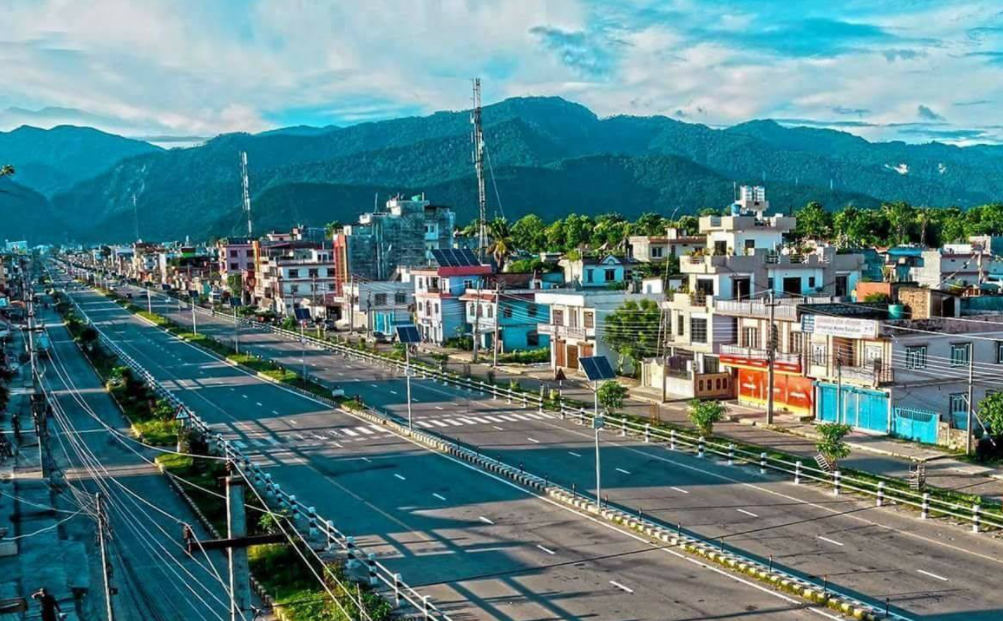
Butwal-Bhairahawa road (H10)

=== Transportation ===
==== Roadways ====
Transportation routes in Lumbini evolved since H01. Lumbini has two major routes, H01 and H10 both intersecting in Butwal. 8,931 km of road is constructed in the Province. Out of which 5,293 km is blacktopped.

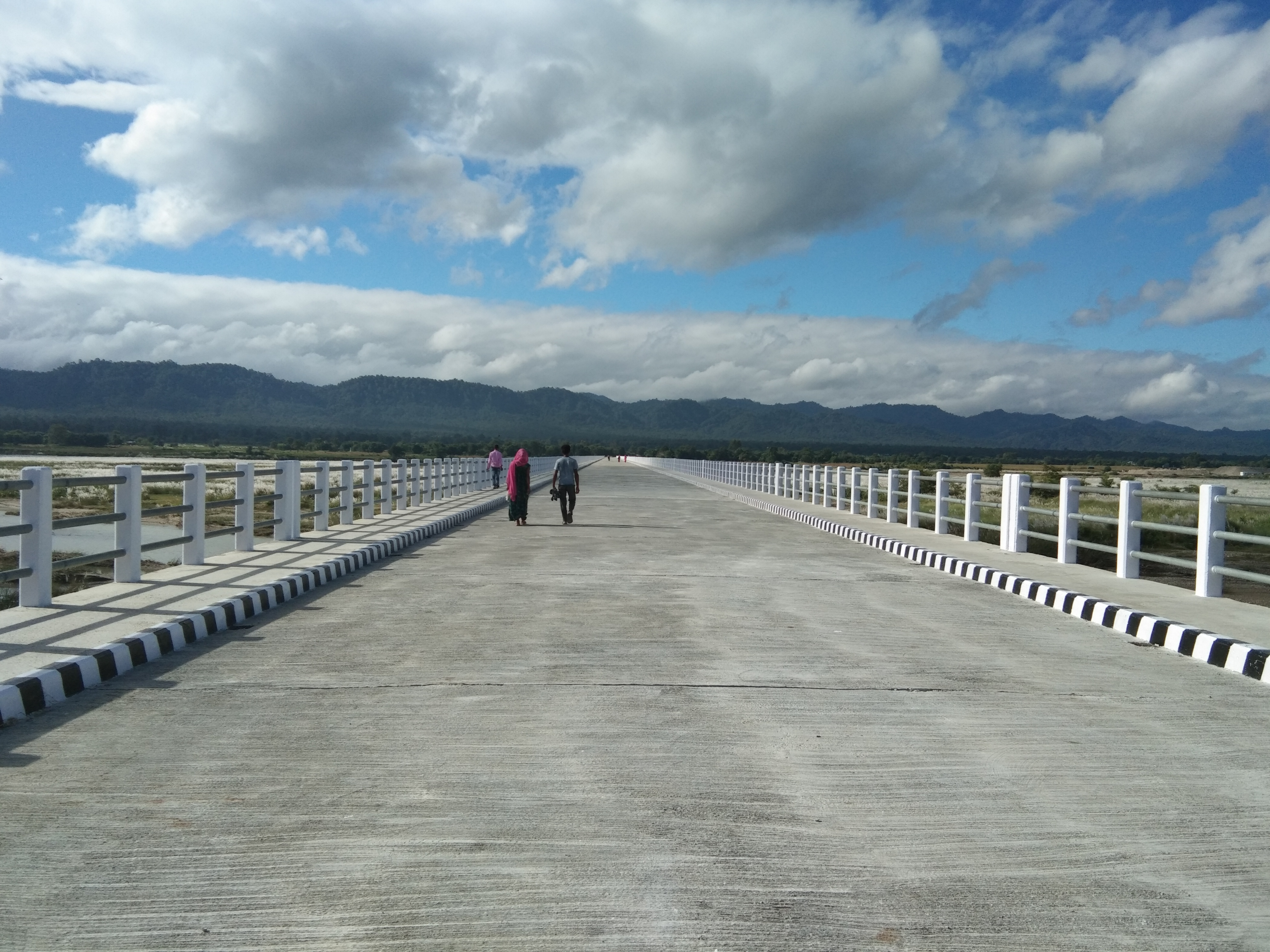
Rapti bridge, Nepal's second longest bridge over West Rapti river in Dang district

All 12 districts of the province are connected via blacktopped roads. Major highways of the province are as follows:

1. Mahendra Highway: Mahendra Highway( H01) traverses districts of Bardiya, Banke, Dang, Kapilvastu, Rupandehi, Parasi latitudinally. It connects to Bagmati to east and Sudurpaschim to the west.
2. Ratna Highway: Ratna Highway ( H12) to Karnali Province. It starts at Nepal- India border in Nepalgunj and terminates at Birendranagar, Surkhet. The highway transition into the Karnali Highway system from the point it terminates.
3. Rapti Highway: Rapti Highway ( H11) starts from Ameliya, Dang and terminates at Musikot West Rukum. This highway makes hilly regions of Rolpa, Salyan West Rukum and east Rukum accessible.
4. Siddhartha Highway: Siddhartha Highway( H10) highway starts at Nepal-India Border in Siddharthanagar and terminates at Prithivi chowk, Pokhara. The major settlements on the highway are Siddharthanagar, Butwal, Tansen, Waling, Putalibazar, Syangja and Pokhara.
5. Hulaki Highway: Postal Highway( H17)

Bhairahawa and Nepalgunj have always been major trade routes with India. Lumbini has no railways but East West railway, Kathmandu-Lumbini railway and several other routes connecting Indian cities are planned.

==== Air Travel ====
Gautam Buddha International Airport, Nepalgunj Airport and Dang Airport are major airstrips in the province. Nepalgunj Airport, Nepal's second most busiest airport after Tribhuwan International Airport, is being upgraded to an international airport as per the 20 year master plan. Being mostly flat land air travel isn't preferable but Nepalgunj Airport serves as hub for most of the airports in Karnali Province and Sudurpaschim Province and is a transit point for tourists heading to Lake Manasarovar and Mount Kailash in Tibet. New airports are under construction in Resunga (Gulmi District) and Sandhikharka (Arghakhanchi District).

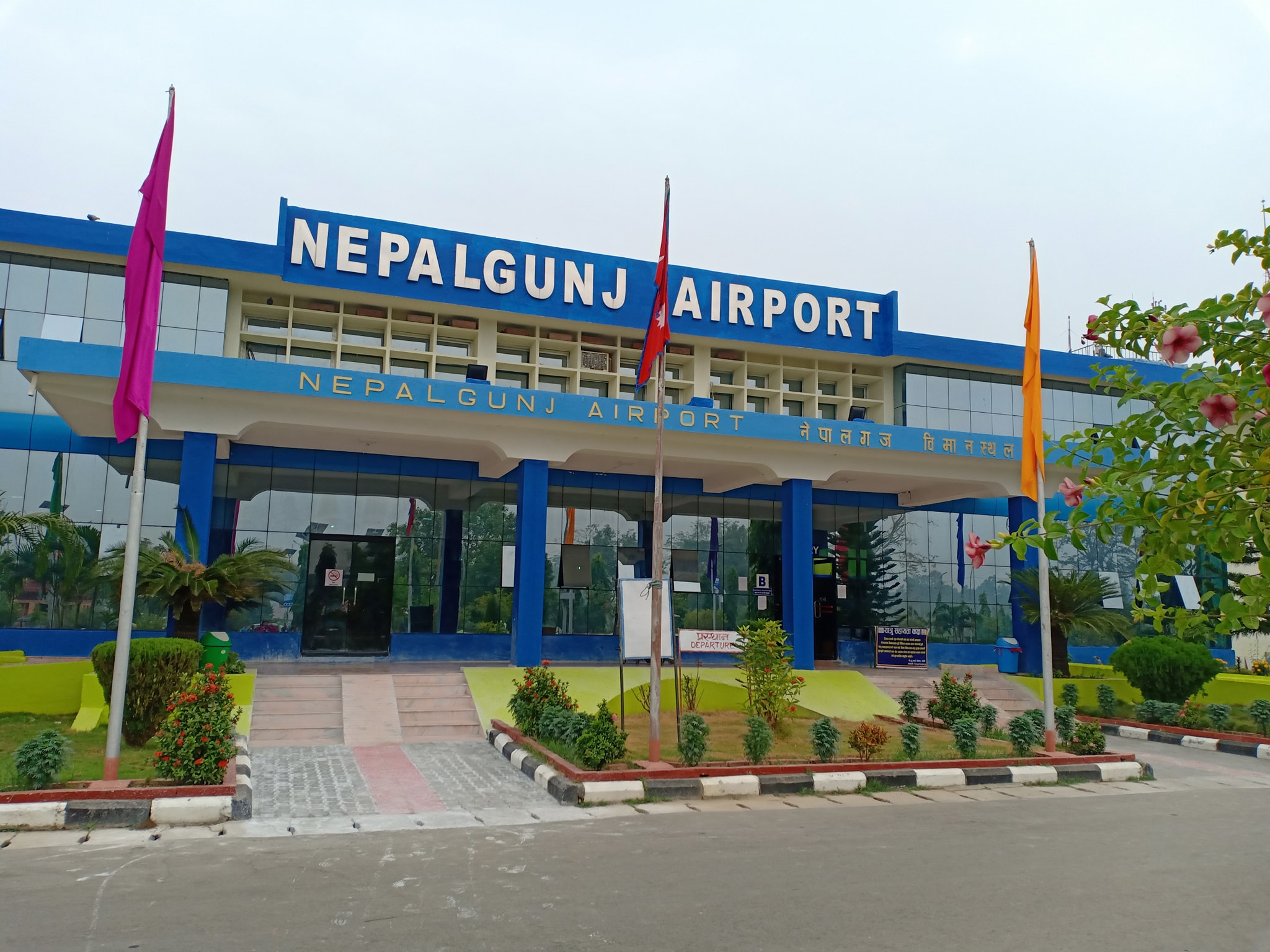
Nepalgunj Airport is Nepal's second-most busiest airport after TIA

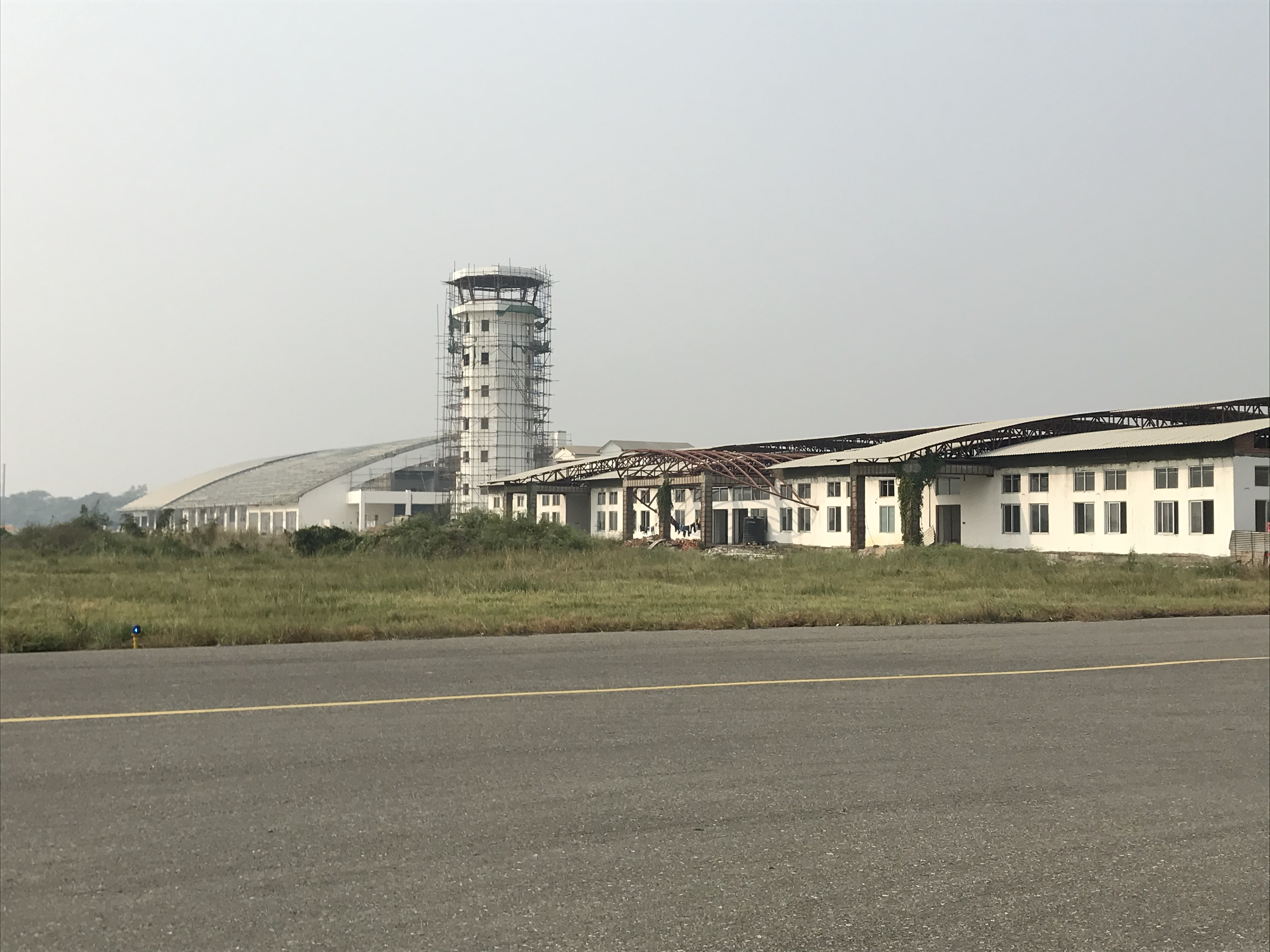
Lumbini hosts Nepal's second international airport - Gautam Buddha International Airport

== See also ==
- List of provinces of Nepal
- List of districts of Nepal
- List of mayors of municipalities in Nepal
- List of districts of Lumbini Province
- Tourism in Lumbini Province
