= Rukum District =

Former District in Nepal

Coordinates: 28.6333°N 82.4667°E

Rukum District रुकुम जिल्ला
- District
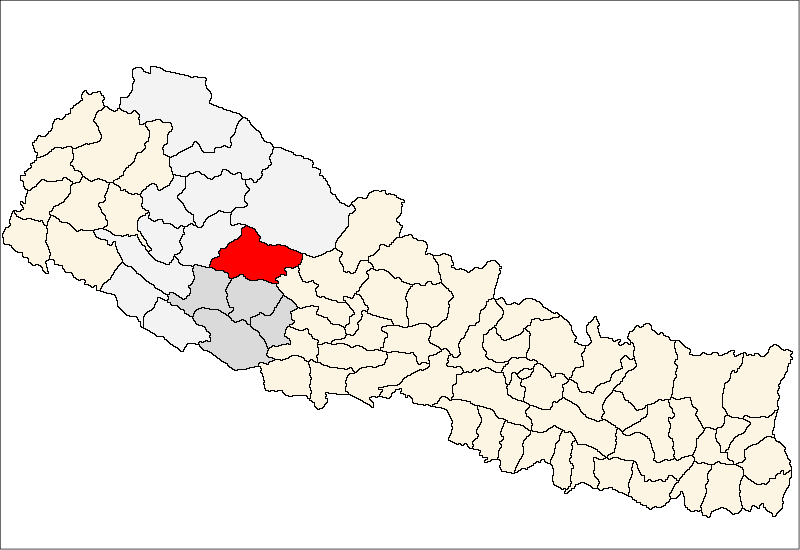
- Country: Nepal
- Development Region: Mid-Western
- Zone: Rapti
- Established: 1962
- Disestablished: 2015 (Constitutionally); 2017 (Administratively)
- Admin HQ.: Musikot

Government
  - Type: Development Committee
  - Body: DDC Rukum

Area
  - Total: 2,877 km^{2} (1,111 sq mi)

Population (2011)
  - Total: 208,567
  - Density: 72.49/km^{2} (187.8/sq mi)
- Time zone: UTC+05:45 (NPT)
- Website: www.ddcrukum.gov.np

Rukum District was a "hills" and "mountains" district some 280 km (170 mi) west of Kathmandu partially belonging to Lumbini Province and partially to Karnali Province before split into two districts Western Rukum and Eastern Rukum after the state's reconstruction of administrative divisions in 2017. Rukum covers an area of 2,877 km^{2} (1,111 sq mi) with population of 207,290 in 2011 Nepal census. Musikot (also called Jhumlikhalanga) was the district's administrative center.

Rukum district has potential tourist attractions that remain largely unexplored including yarsagumba (Ophiocordyceps sinensis) collection caravan destinations, historical sites from the ten-year insurrection including the seat of a breakaway government in Banphikot, eastern Rukum, and the so-called Guerrilla Trek passes through this area that was a hotbed for recruiting and training as well as a battleground during Nepal's civil war (1996–2006). There is 5,911 metres (19,393 ft) Mt. Sisne (Nepali: सिस्ने हिमाल), the westernmost high peak in the Dhaulagiri massif. Locals refer to Sisne as Hiunchuli (hiu: snow; chuli: top) and it is considered sacred as the abode of deities Masta and Saikumari. Climbing history on the mountain is not well documented and an eight-man expedition led by Man Bahadur Khatri reached the summit ridge in May 2013. Rukumkot, a prominent village in Rukum is referred to as "the place of 52 lakes and 53 hills". Rukumkot (Nepali: all of them Shyarpu Tal (Lake) is largest lake in Rukum रुकुमकोट) has a beautiful pond called Rukmini Tal or locally Kamal Dhaha for its lotus flowers (kamal: lotus). Nearby are notable temples called Barah and Sibalaya, and caves such as Deurali Cave.

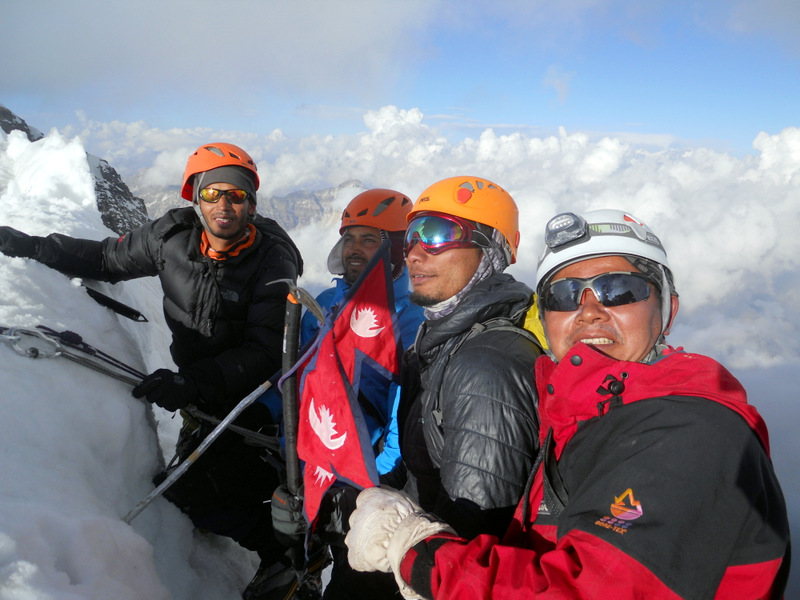
Summit Ridge of Sisne Peak in Rukum, Nepal.

== Geography and Climate ==
Rukum district was the northernmost part of Rapti Zone. It is in the basin of Bheri River, a major tributary of the Karnali. Most of Rukum is drained by west-flowing tributaries such as Uttar Ganga draining Dhorpatan Valley and to the north of that the Sani Bheri draining southern slopes of the western Dhaulagiri Himalaya.

Elevation ranges from below 800 meters along the Bheri and its lowest tributaries to about 6,000 meters in the Dhaulagiris with a range of climates from sub-tropical to perpetual snow and ice. Agricultural use ranges from irrigated rice cultivation through upland cultivation of maize, barley, wheat, potatoes and fruit, to sub-alpine and alpine pasturage reaching about 4,500 meters.

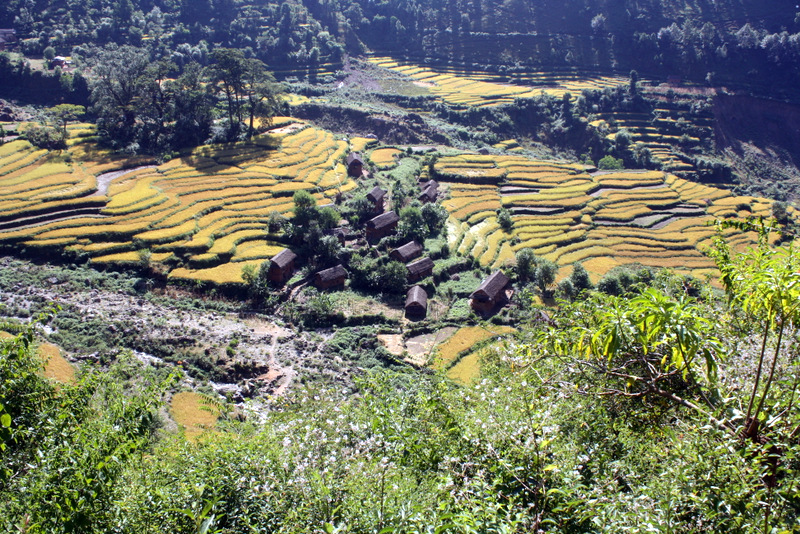
Irrigated rice cultivation around a small village in Rukum, Nepal.

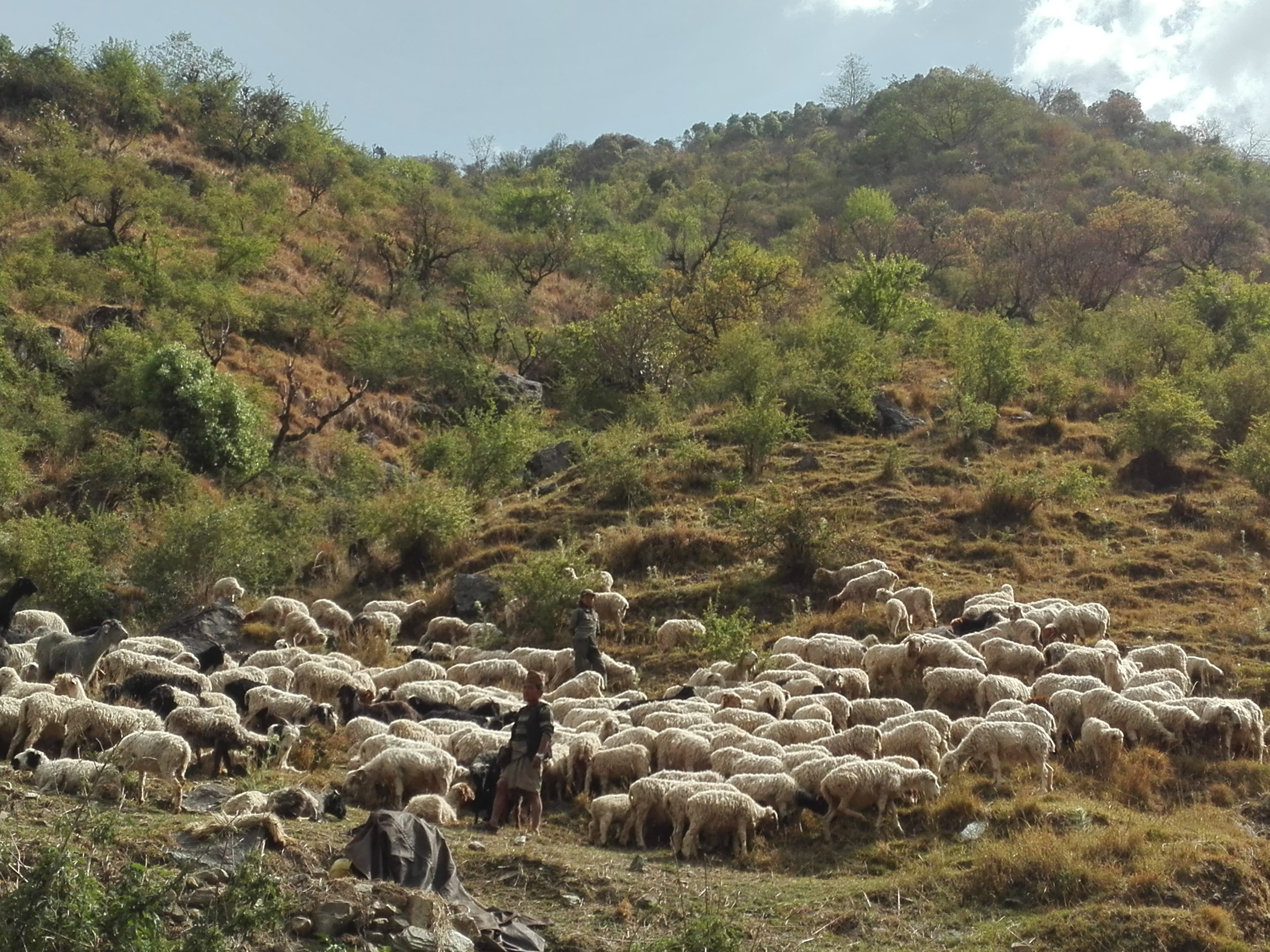
Sheep rearing by a shepherd in Kankri village of Rukum district in Nepal.

Climate Zone	Elevation Range	% of Area
Upper Tropical	300 to 1,000 meters 1,000 to 3,300 ft.	2.9%
Subtropical	1,000 to 2,000 meters 3,300 to 6,600 ft.	26.0%
Temperate	2,000 to 3,000 meters 6,400 to 9,800 ft.	32.6%
Subalpine	3,000 to 4,000 meters 9,800 to 13,100 ft.	23.0%
Alpine	4,000 to 5,000 meters 13,100 to 16,400 ft.	14.9%
Nival	above 5,000 meters	0.7%

== Demographics ==
At the time of the 2011 Nepal census, Rukum District had a population of 208,567. Of these, 91.6% spoke Nepali, 5.2% Magar and 2.8% Magar Kham as their first language.

== Transport ==
Rukum District is considered remote and air service is irregular. With recent road building, bus and jeep service are available with links to the southern plains and major cities including Kathmandu. Two airports offer safe but rudimentary facilities for passenger flights, mainly from Nepalganj and Kathmandu.

The Rapti Highway was under construction (as of 2010) to connect Musikot to Salyan Khalanga, Tulsipur, and Mahendra Highway to the south. On the other hand, Nepal's dream project "Mid-Hill Highway" is under construction.

=== Rapti Highway ===
It is about a four-hour bus ride from Dang Tulsipur to Rukum Musikot.

=== Mid-Hill Highway ===
Mid-Hill Highway is under construction. It is a national pride project that passes through 12 zones, 24 districts, and 215 VDCs. With a total length of 1,767 km, the highway connects Chiyo Bhanjyang of Pachthar district in the east with Jhulaghat of Baitadi district in the west.

The bus ride from Kathmandu takes up to 24 hours to Musikot.

=== Airports ===
The two airports in Rukum are in Chaurjahari (Nepali: चौरजहारी) and Salle (Nepali: सल्ले).

Chaurjahari Airport lies near the Bheri River, 762 m above sea level and accessible by footpaths and horse trails only, with a grass runway 850 m long and 30 m wide. It was the primary mode of travel to Rukum for government, NGO personnel, aid workers and backpackers before the civil war. During the conflict the security situation deteriorated and the local police station was shut down. The airport has 10 aircraft parking spaces.

The flight from Nepalganj to Rukum Salle airport takes 20–300 minutes.

Rukum Salle Airport lies near Musikot, the district headquarters. It is accessible by foot way and road transport since Rapti Highway has touched Salle airport. Its runway is 650 meters long with capability of parking of four aircraft.

The flight from Kathmandu to Rukum Salle airport takes about 90 minutes, while the flight from Nepalganj takes about 20 minutes.

== Civil War ==
Rukum was a flashpoint of the Maoist insurgency, along with neighboring Rolpa district. Rukum became a stronghold and was controlled by insurgents throughout the conflict. Many Maoist leaders came from this district, as well as many martyred insurgents. But now Rukum is known as a new tourism destination in Nepal. The Government of Nepal with the Nepal Tourism Board, Rukum District officials, Maoists party leaders, and a foreign author of a guidebook and map to the area launched the Guerrilla Trek (Peace Trail) with a ceremony in Kathmandu in Oct 2012.

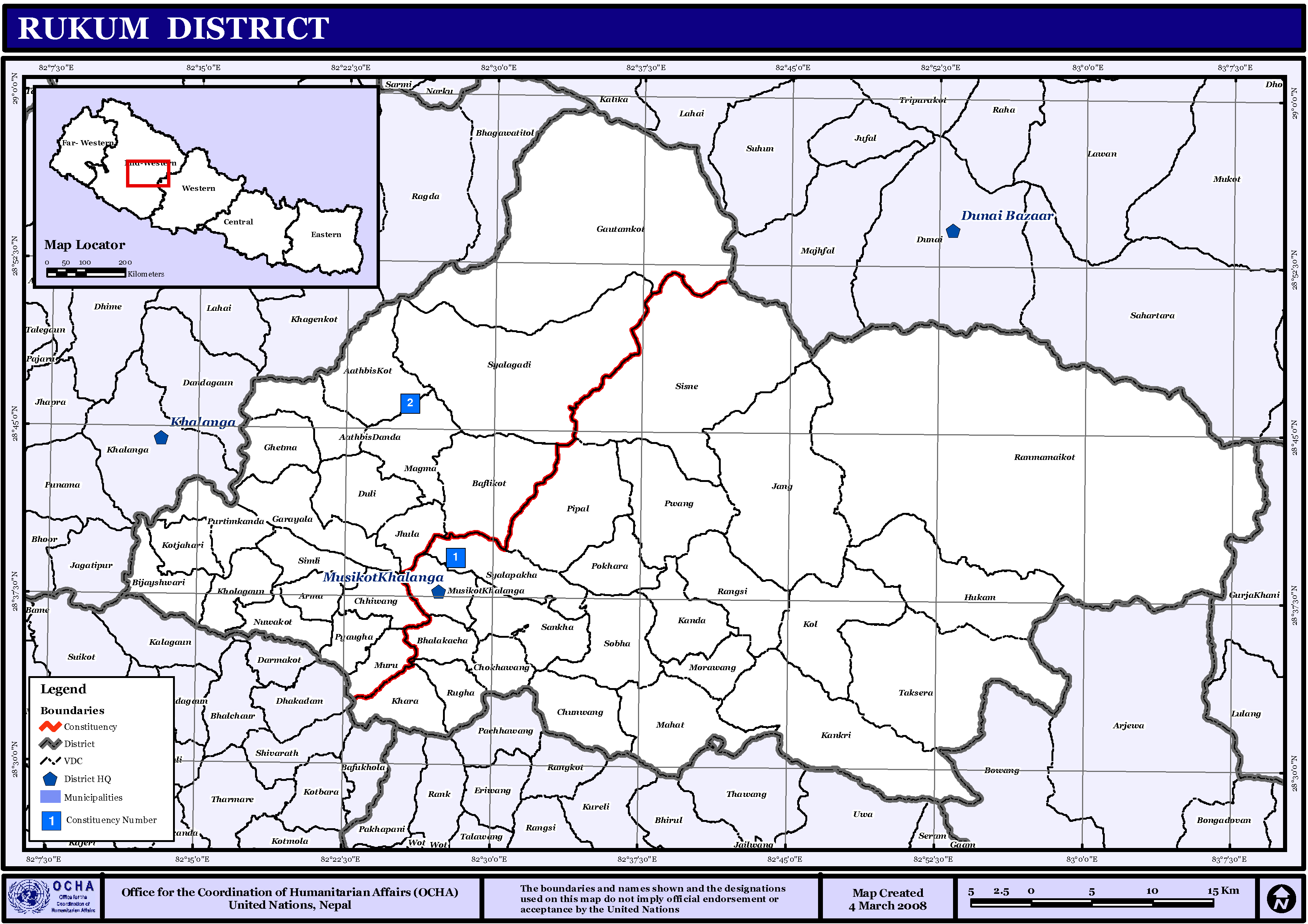
VDCs in Rukum

== Former Villages Development Committees (VDCs) ==
- Aathbis Danda, Aathbis Kot, Arma
- Banphikot, Bhalakachha
- Chaurjahari Municipality, Chhiwang, Chokhawang, Chunwang
- Duli
- Garayala, Gautamkot, Ghetma
- Hukam
- Jang, Jhula
- Kanda, Kankri, Khara, Kholagaun, Kol, Kotjahari
- Magma, Mahat, Morawang, Muru, Musikot Khalanga
- Nuwakot
- Pipal, Pokhara, Purtim Kanda, Pwang, Pyaugha
- Rangsi, Ranmamekot
- Rukumkot, Rugha
- Sankha, Simli, Sisne, Syalagadi, Syalapakha
- Taksera

== Maps ==
- Besides the United Nations/Nepal map of districts and VDCs shown above, their Map Centre has a downloadable PDF version adding municipalities, roads and water detail.
- From 1992 to 2002 a definitive series of large scale topographic maps were surveyed and published through a joint project by Government of Nepal Survey Department and Finland's Ministry for Foreign Affairs contracting through the FinnMap consulting firm. Japan International Cooperation Agency substituted for FinnMap in Lumbini Zone.

Topographic sheets at 1:25,000 scale covering 7.5 minutes latitude and longitude map the Terai and Middle Mountains. Less populated high mountain regions are on 15 minute sheets at 1:50,000. JPG scans can be downloaded here: These sheets cover Rukum District:

1. 2882 02 "Radi Jyula" (2001)
2. 2882 03 "Sisne" (2001)
3. 2882 04 "Dunai" (2001)
4. 2882 05B "Jajarkot Khalanga" (1999)
5. 2882 05D "Swikot" (1999)
6. 2882 06A
7. 2882 06B "Musikot Khalanga" (1999)
8. 2882 06C "Pharulachaur" (1999)
9. 2882 06D "Simruth" (1999)
10. 2882 07A "Jibu" (1999)
11. 2882 07B "Naigad" (1999)
12. 2882 07C "Sakh" (1999)
13. 2882 07D "Mahatgau" (1999)
14. 2882 08 "Takagao" .(2001)
15. 2882 11B "Jelban" (1999)
16. 2882 12A "Uwa" (1999)
17. 2882 12B "Bhalkot" (1998)
18. 2883 01 "Chhedhul Gumba" (2001)
19. 2883 05 "Gurjakhani" (2001)
