= Aathbiskot =

Place in Nepal

Aathbiskot आठबीसकोट
- Municipality
- Location in Nepal
- Coordinates: 28.80°N 82.39°E
- Country: Nepal
- District: West Rukum
- No. of wards: 14
- Established: 10 March 2017

Government
  - Mayor: Mr. Ravi KC (NCP)
  - Deputy mayor: Mrs. Dhan Kumari Shahi (NCP)

Area
  - Total: 560.34 km^{2} (216.35 sq mi)
  - Rank: 2nd

Population (2011)
  - Total: 33,601
  - Density: 59.965/km^{2} (155.31/sq mi)
- Time zone: UTC+5:45 (Nepal Time)
- Area codes: +977-88
- Website: official website

Aathbiskot is a Municipality in West Rukum District in Karnali Province of Nepal that was established in 2015 through the merging the former Village development committees of Aathbiskot, Aathbisdandagaun, Ghetma, Magma, Gotamkot and Syalakhadi.

== Demographics ==
At the time of the 2011 Nepal census, Aathbiskot Municipality had a population of 33,624. of these, 99.9% spoke Nepali, 0.1% Maithili and 0.1% other languages as their first language.

In terms of ethnicity/caste, 44.7% were Chhetri, 25.6% Kami, 12.1% Magar, 7.8% Thakuri, 4.2% Damai/Dholi, 2.1% Sarki, 1.6% Hill Brahmin, 1.1% Sanyasi/Dasnami, 0.3% Badi, 0.1% other Dalit, 0.1% Sonar, 0.1% Tamang, 0.1% other Terai and 0.1% others.

In terms of religion, 98.5% were Hindu and 1.4% Christian.

In terms of literacy, 58.3% could read and write, 2.1% could only read and 39.5% could neither read nor write.

== Media ==
To Promote local culture Aathbiskot has one FM radio station Radio Sisne - 92.8 MHz Which is a Community radio Station.
