= List of districts of Lumbini Province =

Districts of Lumbini लुम्बिनीका जिल्लाहरु (Nepali)
- Category: Jilla
- Location: Nepal
- Created: pre 1816
- Number: 12 (as of 20 September 2015)
- Populations: 880,196 – 53,018
- Areas: 2,955 square kilometres (1,141 mi^{2}) - 634 square kilometres (245 sq mi)
- Government: District Coordination Committee
- Subdivisions: Urban Municipality; Rural Municipality

Lumbini Province is divided into 12 districts. A district is administered by the head of the District Coordination Committee and the District Administration Officer. The districts are further divided into municipalities or rural municipalities. Capital city of Lumbini province is Bhalubang (Dang)

== District official include ==
- Chief District Officer, an official under Ministry of Home Affairs is appointed by the government as the highest administrative officer in a district. The C.D.O is responsible for proper inspection of all the departments in a district such as health, education, security and all other government offices.
- District Coordination Committee acts as an executive to the District Assembly. The DCC coordinates with the Provincial Assembly to establish coordination between the Provincial Assembly and rural municipalities and municipalities and to settle disputes, if any, of political nature. It also maintains coordination between the provincial and Federal government and the local bodies in the district.
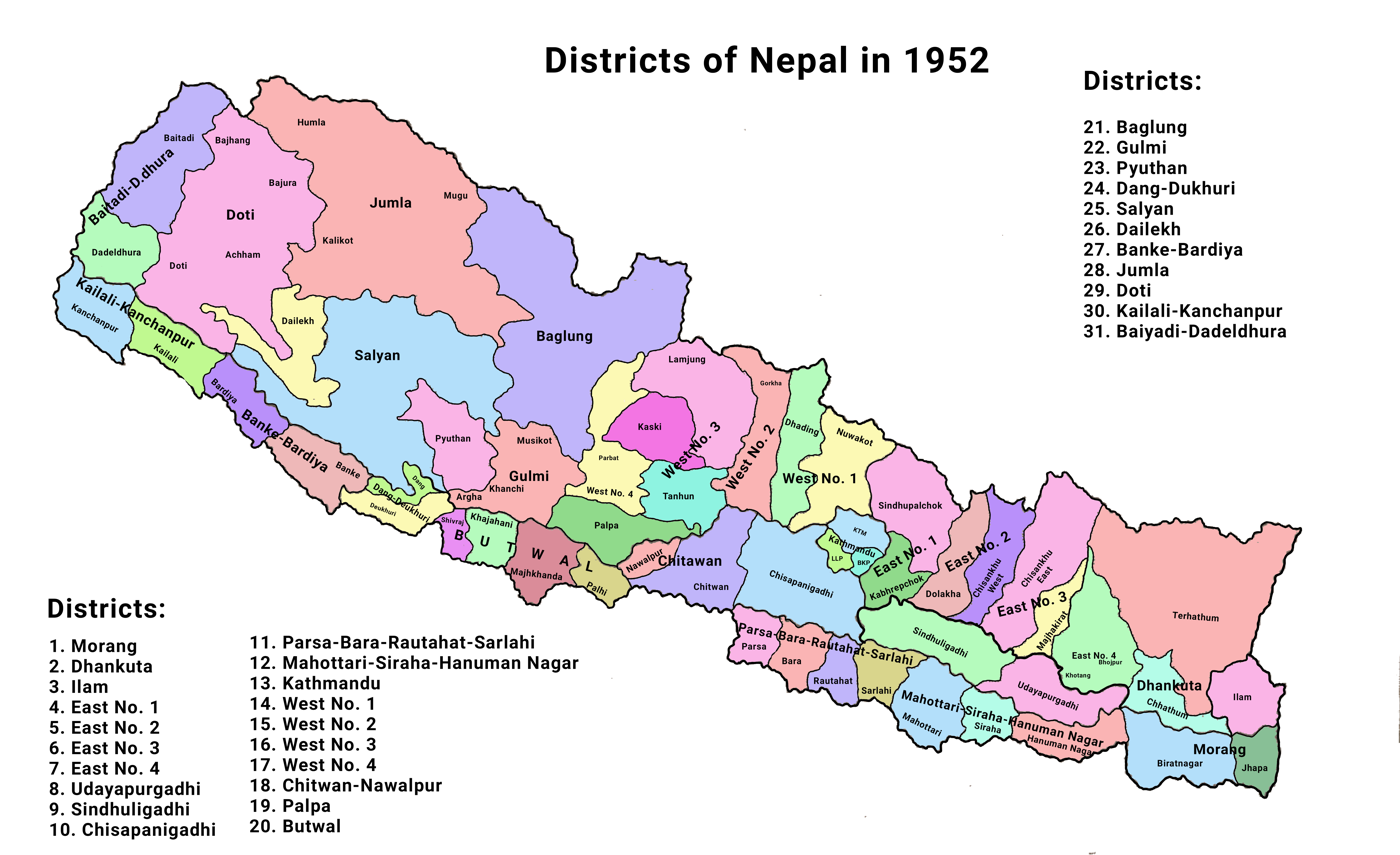
  Districts of Nepal in 1952

Districts of Lumbini
Districts	Nepali	Headquarters	Area (km^{2}.)	Population (2011)	Official Website
Kapilvastu District	कपिलवस्तु जिल्ला	Taulihawa	1,738	571,936	
Nawalparasi (West of Bardaghat Susta) District	नवलपरासी (बर्दघाट सुस्ता पश्चिम)	Ramgram	634.88	321,058	
Rupandehi District	रुपन्देही जिल्ला	Siddharthanagar	1,360	880,196	
Arghakhanchi District	अर्घाखाँची जिल्ला	Sandhikharka	1,193	197,632	
Gulmi District	गुल्मी जिल्ला	Tamghas	1,149	280,160	
Palpa District	पाल्पा जिल्ला	Tansen	1,373	261,180	
Dang Deukhuri District	दाङ देउखुरी जिल्ला	Ghorahi	2,955	552,583	
Pyuthan District	प्युठान जिल्ला	Pyuthan	1,309	228,102	
Rolpa District	रोल्पा जिल्ला	Liwang	1,879	224,506	
Eastern Rukum District	पूर्वी रूकुम जिल्ला	Rukumkot	1,161.13	53,018	
Banke District	बाँके जिल्ला	Nepalganj	2,337	491,313	
Bardiya District	बर्दिया जिल्ला	Gulariya	2,025	426,576	
Lumbini Province	लुम्बिनी प्रदेश	Deukhuri	22,288 km^{2}	4,499,272	

== See also ==
- List of Provinces of Nepal
- List of Districts of Nepal
