= Duli =

Duli may refer to:

- Duli, Ardabil, Iran
- Duli, Hamadan, Iran
- Duli, Nepal
- Duli language, an extinct Adamawa language of northern Cameroon
