= Arma =

Arma, ARMA or variants, may refer to:

== Places ==
- Arma, Kansas, United States
- Arma, Nepal
- Arma District, Peru
- Arma District, Yemen
- Arma Mountains, Afghanistan

== People ==
- Arma people, an ethnic group of the middle Niger River valley
- Arma language, a possible but unattested extinct language of Colombia
- Paul Arma (1905–1987), Hungarian-French pianist, composer, and ethnomusicologist
- Rachid Arma (born 1985), Moroccan footballer
- Tom Arma, a New York–based photographer
- Arma Senkrah (1864–1900), an American violinist
- Roger Dingledine, American computer scientist, known by the pseudonym arma

== Organisations ==
- ARMA International, formerly the Association of Records Managers and Administrators
- Agung Rai Museum of Art, Ubud, Bali, Indonesia
- American Rock Mechanics Association, a geoscience organization
- Armenian Medical Association or ArMA
- Association for Renaissance Martial Arts, an American non-profit organization
- FK Ústí nad Labem, nicknamed and formerly named Arma, a Czech football club

== Other uses ==
- Arma (deity), an Anatolian Moon god
- Arma (insect), a genus of stink bugs in the subfamily Asopinae
- Arma (series), a series of video games
- Otokar Arma, a military armoured vehicle
- Autoregressive–moving-average model, or ARMA model, a statistical model for time series
- 16S rRNA (guanine1405-N7)-methyltransferase, or ArmA, an enzyme

== See also ==
- Armas (disambiguation)
- Alma (disambiguation)
