= Musikot =

Musikot may refer to

- Musikot, Western Rukum, a municipality in Western Rukum District, Karnali, Nepal
- Musikot Airport, another name for Rukum Salle Airport
- Musikot, Gulmi, a municipality in Gulmi
