= Pipalia =

Pipalia may refer to one of two villages in Bhopal district, Madhya Pradesh, India:

- Pipalia Chhaparband, Huzur tehsil
- Pipalia Hasnabad, Berasia tehsil

== See also ==
- Pipariya (disambiguation)
- Pipal (disambiguation)
