= Pokhara (disambiguation) =

Pokhara is the capital of Gandaki Province and largest city in Nepal by area.

Pokhara may also refer to:

- Pokhara Valley, the valley where the city lies
- Pokhara, Eastern Rukum, a village development committee in Eastern Rukum District in Lumbini Province of western Nepal
- Pokhara (harvestman), a genus of harvestman (arachnids)
