= Kholagaun =

Kholagaun may refer to:

- Kholagaun, Sindhuli, Nepal
- Kholagaun, Western Rukum, Nepal
