= Bhalakachha =

Bhalakcha भालाकच्छा
- Village development committee
- Location in Nepal
- Coordinates: 28.37°N 82.27°E
- Country: Nepal
- Province: Karnali Province
- District: Western Rukum District

Population (2011)
  - Total: 3,713
- Time zone: UTC+5:45 (Nepal Time)
- Area code: +977-88
- Website: www.ddcrukum.gov.np

Bhalakachha is a village development committee in Western Rukum District in Karnali Province of western Nepal. At the time of the 2011 Nepal census it had a population of 3713 people living in 748 individual households.
