= Rangsi =

Rangsi may refer to:

- Rangsi, Rolpa, in Rolpa District in Nepal
- Rangsi, Rukum, in Rukum District in Nepal
