= Garayala =

Garayala गरायाला
- Village development committee
- Location in Nepal
- Coordinates: 28.68°N 82.33°E
- Country: Nepal
- Province: Karnali Province
- District: Western Rukum District

Population (2011)
  - Total: 5,917
- Time zone: UTC+5:45 (Nepal Time)
- Area code: +977-88
- Website: www.ddcrukum.gov.np

Garayala is a village development committee in Western Rukum District in Karnali Province of western Nepal. At the time of the 1991 Nepal census it had a population of 5917 people living in 1116 individual households.
