= Pippal =

Pippal may refer to:

- Ficus religiosa (sacred fig), pippal or pippala in Sanskrit, a species of fig sacred in Indian religions
- Black pepper and long pepper, pippal or pippali in Sanskrit, origin of the term pepper

People

- Eugenie Pippal-Kottnig (1921–1998), Austrian architect
- Hans Robert Pippal (1915–1998), Austrian painter
- Martina Pippal (born 1957), Austrian art historian and artist

== See also ==
- Pipal (disambiguation)
