= Pipariya =

Pipariya may refer to the following places:

- Pipariya, Balaghat in Madhya Pradesh, India
- Pipariya, Bihar, in Bihar state, India
- Pipariya, Madhya Pradesh, in Hoshangabad, Madhya Pradesh, India
  - Pipariya Assembly constituency
  - Pipariya railway station
- Pipariya, Jabalpur, in Madhya Pradesh, India
- Pipariya, Rautahat, in Narayani, Nepal
- Pipariya, Sarlahi, in Janakpur, Nepal

== See also ==
- Pipalia (disambiguation)
- Pipal (disambiguation)
