= Minimum Conditions and Performance Measures =

Minimum Conditions and Performance Measures, popularly known as MCPM, are criteria of evaluating the performance of the local government bodies (District Development Committees and Municipalities) while the for the Village Development Committees it is limited to Minimum Conditions (MC) only except few those where Performance Measure (PM) has been piloted. MCPM is an undertaking of the Government of Nepal's Local Bodies Fiscal Commission. Minimum Conditions Performance Measure (MCPM) is a system of measuring the performance of local bodies on the basis of certain set standards and tie up the block grants and revenue sharing with their performance result.

Every year Nepalese government conduct MCPM “Minimum Conditions and Performance Measurement” for its local bodies namely, District Development Committees (DDCs), Municipalities and Village Development Committees (VDCs) as a basis to determine the minimum criteria met by those local bodies for the next year’s budget and program allocation from the central government. Alongside the Minimum Conditions (MC), there is another part Performance Measurement (PM) – whatever the terms are they both aid LBs in gaining monetary and other support from the government if they met MC or score higher on the rank or the budget grant is deducted if any LBs fail to meet MC/PM.

MCPM results for VDCs, DDCs and Municipalities are published annually at LBFC's official website. The result analysis is available at the same web page.
