= Armus =

Armus may refer to:

- Alien life form in "Skin of Evil", an episode of Star Trek: The Next Generation
- Sidney Armus (1924–2002), American actor
- Burton Armus (1934–2024), American police detective, actor, writer and television producer

== See also ==
- Armas (disambiguation)
