= Pyaugha =

Peugha पेउघा
- Village development committee
- Location in Nepal
- Coordinates: 28.60°N 82.38°E
- Country: Nepal
- Province: Karnali Province
- District: Western Rukum District

Population (2011)
  - Total: 4,595
- Time zone: UTC+5:45 (Nepal Time)
- Postal code: 22007
- Area code: +977-88
- Website: www.ddcrukum.gov.np

Peugha is a village development committee in Western Rukum District in Karnali Province of western Nepal. At the time of the 2011 Nepal census it had a population of 4595 people living in 819 individual households.
