= Chaurjahari =

Chaurjahari चौरजहारी Chaurjahari, Rukum
- Municipality
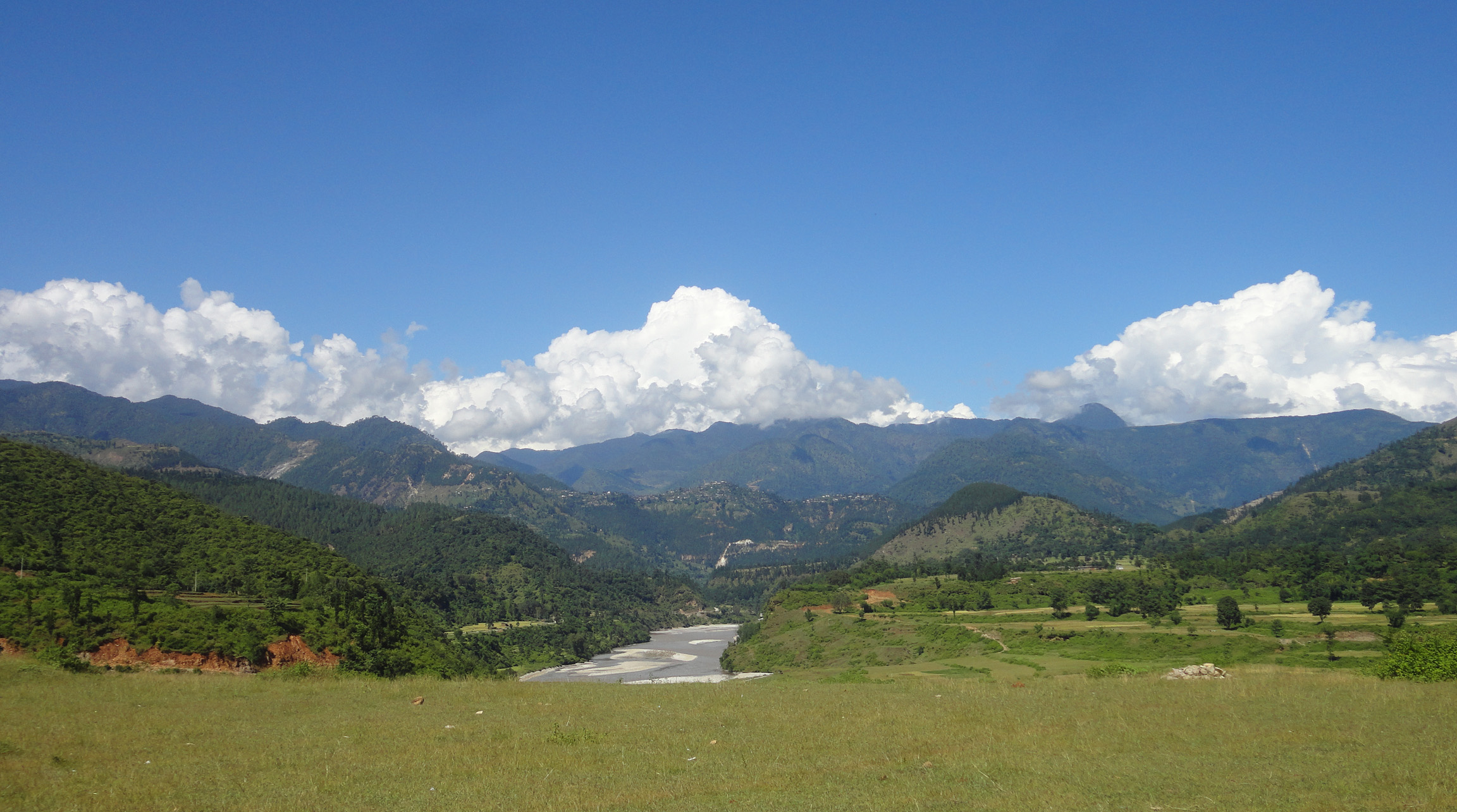
- Chaurjahari

- Location in Nepal
- Coordinates: 28.6549°N 82.1992°E
- Country: Nepal
- Province: Karnali Province
- District: Western Rukum District

Government
  - Mayor: Pushpa Badi (NCP)
  - Deputy Mayor: Ishwori Kumari Sharma B.M (NCP)

Area
  - Total: 107.38 km^{2} (41.46 sq mi)

Population (2011)
  - Total: 27,438
  - Density: 255.52/km^{2} (661.80/sq mi)
- Time zone: UTC+5:45 (NST)
- Website: http://chaurjaharimun.gov.np

Chaurjahari is a Municipality in Western Rukum District in Karnali Province of Nepal that was established in 2015 through the merging the two former Village development committees Bijayaswori and Kotjahari. It lies on the bank of Sani Bheri River.

== Demographics ==
At the time of the 2011 Nepal census, Chaurjahari Municipality had a population of 27,583. Of those, 99.0% spoke Nepali, 0.8% Magar, 0.1% Hindi, 0.1% Urdu and 0.1% other languages as their first language.

In terms of ethnicity/caste, 45.7% were Chhetri, 15.0% Kami, 14.2% Magar, 10.0% Hill Brahmin, 4.5% Thakuri, 3.8% Sarki, 2.6% Damai/Dholi, 2.5% Sanyasi/Dasnami, 1.0% Badi, 0.2% Musalman, 0.2% Newar, 0.1% Terai Brahmin, 0.1% Gurung, 0.1% other Terai and 0.1% others.

In terms of religion, 97.5% were Hindu, 1.8% Buddhist, 0.5% Christian and 0.2% Muslim.

In terms of literacy, 65.5% could read and write, 2.5% could only read and 31.9% could neither read nor write.

== Transportation ==
Chaurjahari Airport lies in Old-Bijayashwari.

== See also ==
- Chaurjahari Cricket Ground
