= District administration in Nepal =

Structure of Nepal government

District administration makes up the third level of government division in Nepal. The provision for a District Assembly, which acts as the legislature at the district-level, is mentioned in Part 17 of the Constitution of Nepal. The 77 districts of Nepal each have their own district assemblies which in turn elect their own District Coordination Committees, which serves as the executive at the district-level. In addition to this each district also has a District Administration Office which oversees the general administration of each district.

== District Administration Office ==
The District Administration Office (Nepali: जिल्ला प्रशासन कार्यालय) is a general administration of government in each district of Nepal. The government of Nepal appoints a Chief District Officer in each district to function as a Chief Administration Officer.

The Local Administration Act, 2028 (1971) was implemented to conduct local administration in accordance with the decentralized administration system to effectively operate peace and order. Section 5 of the Local Administration Act was constituted to be a district administration office in every district to conduct general administration of the district. The DAO in each district of Nepal works under Ministry of Home Affairs. The main function of the DAO is to maintain peace, order and security in the district and provide assistance in development activities run by the federal government, provincial government, District Coordination Committee, urban municipality and rural municipality.

=== Chief District Officer ===
The Chief District Officer (Nepali: प्रमुख जिल्ला अधिकृत, abbreviation: C.D.O.) is an administrative rank under Ministry of Home Affairs in Nepal who is appointed by the government as the senior-most executive magistrate and chief in-charge of general administration of a district . The main administration guideline is the Local Administration Act, 1972.

The C.D.O. is responsible for proper inspection of all the departments in a district such as health, education, security and all other government offices. In case of threatened public security conditions like riots, the C.D.O. can mobilize security forces and take other actions like imposing curfew order, fixing restricted area, arresting anyone according to law, hearing some cases as a quasi-judicial body. Distributing the Certificate of Nepalese Citizenship, processing and recommendation for passports, maintaining peace and security, law and order, acting as a representative of government, enjoying the authorities provided by more than 90 prevailing acts make a Chief District Officer powerful.

The C.D.O. is the most powerful position in Nepalese administrative service. Likewise, Assistant Chief District Officers enjoys almost all the authorities as delegated by C.D.O. and other laws.

== District Assembly ==
The District Assembly (Nepali: जिल्ला सभा) is composed of chairpersons and vice-chairpersons of each rural municipality and mayors and deputy mayors of each municipality within a district. The District Assembly coordinates between all municipalities and rural municipalities within the district. It elects a nine-member District Coordination Committee including a chief and deputy chief and at least three women and one member from the Dalit or minority communities for a five-year term. Any member within the village or municipal assembly in local levels within the district are eligible to be elected to the District Coordination Committee and if elected their status as a local representative will lapse.

== District Coordination Committee ==
The District Coordination Committee (Nepali: जिल्ला समन्वय समिति, abbreviation: DCC) was formed on March 14, 2017, to replace the existing district development committee. Each of the 77 districts in Nepal have their own district coordination committees in.

The Head of a district development committee is elected by the district assembly. The government also appoints a Local Development Officer in each district development committee who heads the DCC in absence of an elected head or deputy head.

The DCC acts as an executive to the district Assembly. The DCC coordinates with the Provincial Assembly to establish coordination between the Provincial Assembly and rural municipalities and municipalities and to settle disputes, if any, of political nature. It also maintains coordination between the provincial and Federal government and among the local bodies in the district. It also monitors development within the district.

== List of district coordination committees with their heads ==
SN	District	Nepali	Chief District Officer	District assembly chief	Political party	DCC Website	DAO Website
1	Taplejung	ताप्लेजुंग	Hiradevi Paudel	Tshiring Lama	CPN (Unified Socialist)		
2	Panchthar	पाँचथर	मेखबहादुर मंग्राती				
3	Ilam	इलाम	इन्द्रदेव यादव			https://dccilam.gov.np/	https://daoilam.moha.gov.np/
4	Jhapa	झापा	गोपाल कुमार अधिकारी				
5	Morang	मोरङ	वीरेन्द्र कुमार यादव				
6	Sunsari	सुनसरी	रामचन्द्र तिवारी				
7	Dhankuta	धनकुटा	पुण्यविक्रम पौडेल				
8	Tehrathum	तेर्हथुम	कृष्ण पौडेल				
9	Sankhuwasabha	संखुवासभा	शिव कुमार कार्की	Suman Shakya	CPN (Unified Socialist)		
10	Bhojpur	भोजपुर	हरि प्रसाद घिमिरे				
11	Solukhumbu	सोलुखुम्बु	देवी पाण्डे (खत्री)				
12	Okhaldhunga	ओखलढुङ्गा	चेतराज बराल				
13	Khotang	खोटाङ	सन्त बहादुर सुनार				
14	Udayapur	उदयपुर	जनार्दन गौतम	Gaur Bahadur Bishwakarma	CPN (Unified Socialist)		
15	Saptari	सप्तरी	Rudraprasad Pandit	Shiv Narayan Shah	Nepali Congress		
16	Siraha	सिरहा	Bhagirath Pandey	Dinesh Kumar Mahato	PSP-N		
17	Dhanusa	धनुषा	Dilip Kumar Chapagai	Ramnandan Mandal	Nepali Congress		
18	Mahottari	महोत्तरी	शिवराम गेलाल	Suman Kumar Lal Karn	LSP-N		
19	Sarlahi	सर्लाही	Gopal Kumar Adhikari	Kaushal Kishor Singh	Nepali Congress		
20	Sindhuli	सिन्धुली					
21	Ramechhap	रामेछाप	Shobhakhar Regmi				
22	Dolakha	दोलखा	Laxman Bikram Thapa				
23	Sindhupalchok	सिन्धुपाल्चोक					
24	Kavrepalanchowk	काभ्रेपलाञ्चोक	Shiv Prasad Shimkhada	Dip Kumar Gautam	CPN (Unified Socialist)		
25	Lalitpur	ललितपुर	Mahadeb Pantha		Nepali Congress		
26	Bhaktapur	भक्तपुर	रोशनी कुमारी श्रेष्ठ				
27	Kathmandu	काठमाडौं	Kedarnath Sharma				
28	Nuwakot	नुवाकोट	Birendra Kumar Yadav				
29	Rasuwa	रसुवा					
30	Dhading	धादिङ	Shyam Prasad Bhandari				
31	Makwanpur	मकवानपुर	Tirtharaj Chiluwal				
32	Rautahat	रौतहट	Basu Dev Ghimire	Ram Ayodhya Yadav	Nepali Congress		
33	Bara	बारा	Vijay Narayan Manandhar	Narendra Kumar Sah	CPN (UML)		
34	Parsa	पर्सा	Vinod Prakash Singh	Niranjan Sah Sonar	PSP-N		
35	Chitwan	चितवन	Narayan Prasad Bhatt		Nepali Congress		
36	Gorkha	गोरखा	Shri Jitendra Basnet				
37	Lamjung	लमजुङ	Yuvaraj Mainali				
38	Tanahun	तनहुँ	Bharat Kumar Sharma				
39	Syangja	स्याङ्जा	Shri Mahesh Aacharya				
40	Kaski	कास्की	Taranath Adhikari				
41	Manang	मनाङ	Hariprasad Panta				
42	Mustang	मुस्ताङ	Ramchandra Tiwari				
43	Myagdi	म्याग्दी	Krishnaprasad Adhikari				
44	Parbat	पर्वत	Rajesh Panthi				
45	Baglung	बागलुङ					
46	Gulmi	गुल्मी	Shri Gopal Prasad Aryal				
47	Palpa	पाल्पा	Bishnu Prasad Dhakal				
48	Nawalpur	नवलपुर	Udaya Bahadur Rana Magar				
49	Parasi	परासी					
50	Rupandehi	रुपन्देही	Hariprasad Mainali				
51	Kapilvastu	कपिलवस्तु	Madan Bhujel				
52	Arghakhanchi	अर्घाखाँची	BijayRaj Paudel				
53	Pyuthan	प्युठान	Dr. Krishna Bahadur Ghimire				
54	Rolpa	रोल्पा	Ganj Bahadur MC				
55	Eastern Rukum	पूर्वी रुकुम	Bhupendra Sapkota				
56	Western Rukum	पश्चिमी रुकुम	Banshi Kumar Aacharya				
57	Salyan	सल्यान	Paramananda Ghimire				
58	Dang	दाङ	Shri Gajendra Bahadur Shrestha				
59	Banke	बाँके	Ramesh Kumar KC				
60	Bardiya	बर्दिया	Shri PremLal Lamichhane				
61	Surkhet	सुर्खेत	Sitaram Karki				
62	Dailekh	दैलेख	Nabaraj Jaisi				
63	Jajarkot	जाजरकोट	Pushparaj Shahi				
64	Dolpa	डोल्पा	Bhupendra Thapa				
65	Jumla	जुम्ला	Bishnu Paudel				
66	Kalikot	कालिकोट	Chandranath Gautam				
67	Mugu	मुगु	Shri Umakanta Adhikari				
68	Humla	हुम्ला		Shiv Raj Sharma	CPN (Unified Socialist)		
69	Bajura	बाजुरा	Luk Bahadur Chetri				
70	Bajhang	बझाङ	Prem Singh Kunwar				
71	Achham	अछाम	Kishor Kumar Chaudhari				
72	Doti	डोटी	Surya Bahadur Khatri				
73	Kailali	कैलाली	Gobind Prasad Rijal		Nepali Congress		
74	Kanchanpur	कञ्चनपुर	Ram Prasad Pandey				
75	Dadeldhura	डडेल्धुरा	Janakraj Bhatt				
76	Baitadi	बैतडी	Siddha Raj Joshi				
77	Darchula	दार्चुला	Janardan Gautam				

== See also ==
- Gaunpalika
- List of cities in Nepal
- List of gaunpalikas of Nepal
- Village development committee
- District Development Committee
