= Kholagaun, Western Rukum =

Kholagaun खोलागाउँ
- Village development committee
- Location in Nepal
- Coordinates: 28.63°N 82.29°E
- Country: Nepal
- Zone: Rapti Zone
- District: Rukum District

Population (2011)
  - Total: 6,116
- Time zone: UTC+5:45 (Nepal Time)
- Area code: +977-88
- Website: www.ddcrukum.gov.np

Kholagaun is a village development committee in Western Rukum District in Karnali Province of western Nepal. At the time of the 1991 Nepal census it had a population of 4,462 living in 778 individual households.
