= Aathbisdandagaun =

Place in Nepal

Aathbisdandagaun आठबीस डाँडागाउँ
- Village development committee
- Location in Nepal Aathbisdandagaun (Asia)
- Coordinates: 28.75°N 82.39°E
- Country: Nepal
- Province: Karnali Province
- District: Western Rukum District

Population (2011)
  - Total: 7,439
- Time zone: UTC+5:45 (Nepal Time)
- Area code: +977-88
- Website: www.ddcrukum.gov.np

Aathbis Danda is a village development committee in Western Rukum District in Karnali Province of western Nepal. At the time of the 1991 Nepal census it had a population of 7439 people living in 1440 individual households.
