= Syalakhadi =

Syalagadi स्यालाखदी
- Village development committee
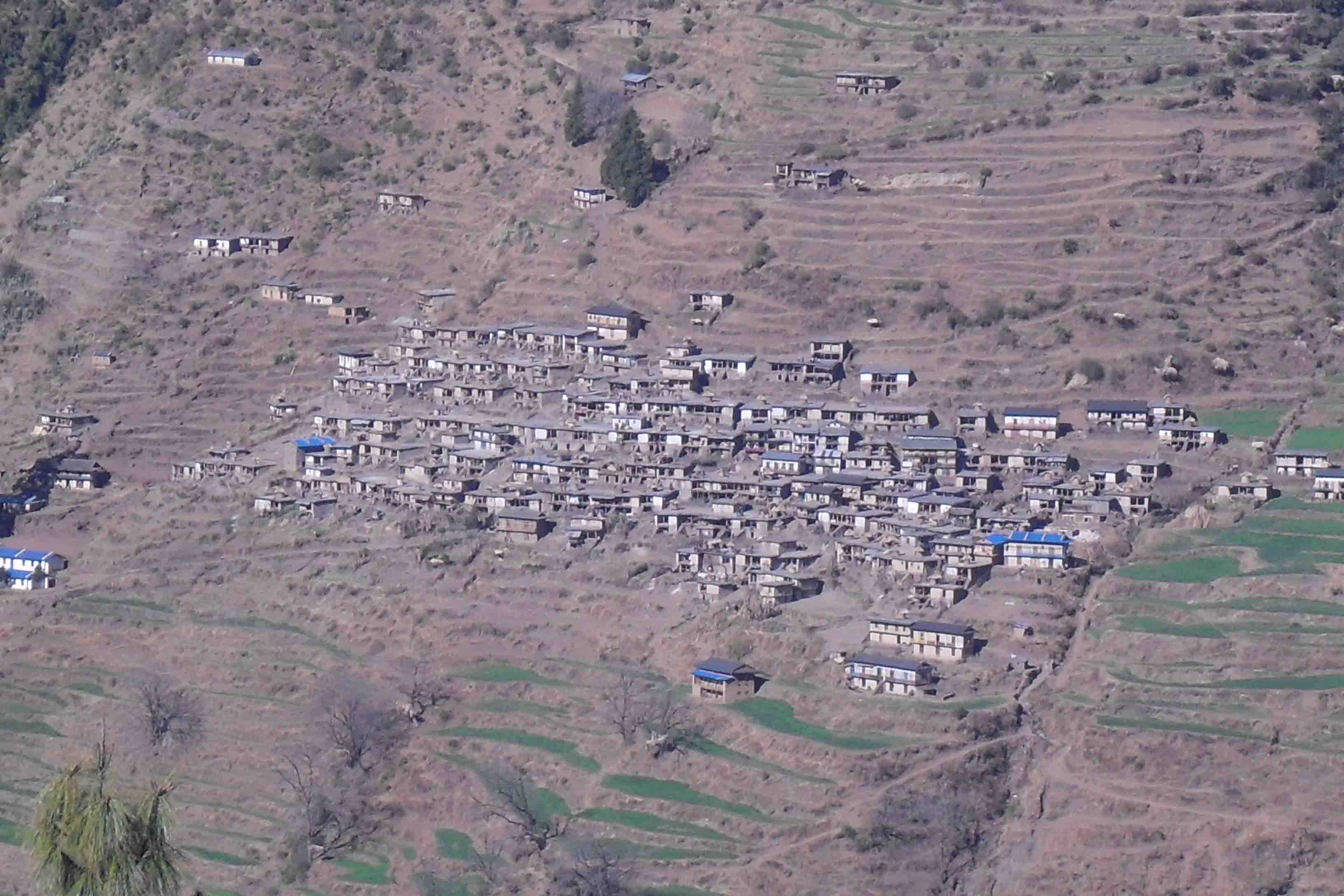

- Location in Nepal
- Coordinates: 28.80°N 82.51°E
- Country: Nepal
- Province: Karnali Province
- District: Western Rukum District

Population (2011)
  - Total: 4,695
- Time zone: UTC+5:45 (Nepal Time)
- Area code: +977-88
- Website: www.ddcrukum.gov.np

Syalakhadi is a village development committee in Western Rukum District in Karnali Province of western Nepal. At the time of the 2011 Nepal census it had a population of 4695 people living in 852 individual households. There is a lake in Pahada village. There are various types of houses near the lake. The lake in Pahada is also called Kanda Daha. The lake is surrounded by a variety of plants, including sallo.
