= Armas (disambiguation) =

The Arma people are an ethnic group of the Niger River valley.

Armas may also refer to:

== People ==
- Balthazar Armas (born 1941), Venezuelan painter
- Carlos Castillo Armas (1914-1957), Guatemalan president
- Chris Armas (born 1972), American soccer player
- Christian Armas (born 1986), Mexican footballer
- Frederick A. de Armas, American literature professor
- Joel Armas (born 1973), American swimmer
- Marcos Armas (born 1969), Venezuelan baseball player
- Reynaldo Armas (born 1953), Venezuelan singer and composer
- Tony Armas (born 1953), Venezuelan baseball player
- Tony Armas Jr. (born 1978), Venezuelan baseball player
- Ximena Armas (born 1946), Chilean painter
- Ana de Armas (born 1988), Cuban-Spanish actress
- Armas Amukoto (born 1973), Namibian politician

== Other uses ==
- Naviera Armas, a Spanish ferry company
- Arma language

== See also ==
- Arma (disambiguation)
