= Gotamkot =

Gotamkot गौतमकोट
- Village development committee
- Location in Nepal
- Coordinates: 28.90°N 82.61°E
- Country: Nepal
- Zone: Rapti Zone
- District: Rukum District

Population (2011)
  - Total: 7,040
- Time zone: UTC+5:45 (Nepal Time)
- Area code: +977-88
- Website: www.ddcrukum.gov.np

Gotamkot is a village development committee in Rukum District in the Rapti Zone of western Nepal. At the time of the 2011 Nepal census it had a population of 7040 people living in 1361 individual households.
