= Pipal =

Pipal may refer to:

- Ficus religiosa (also known as the sacred fig, bodhi tree, bo tree, pipal, peepal, peepul, pipala), a species of banyan fig native to Indian subcontinent and Indochina, sacred in Indian religions
- Pipal, Nepal, a village development committee in Rukum District in the Rapti Zone of western Nepal.
- Pipal Park, a park in Omaha, Nebraska, United States
- Joseph Pipal, American basketball and football coach

== See also ==
- Pippal (disambiguation)
- Pipalia (disambiguation)
- Pipariya (disambiguation)
