= Duli, Nepal =

Duli दुली
- Village Development Committee
- Location in Nepal
- Coordinates: 28.70°N 82.39°E
- Country: Nepal
- Province: Karnali Province
- District: Western Rukum District

Population (2011)
  - Total: 4,837
- Time zone: UTC+5:45 (Nepal Time)
- Area code: +977-88
- Website: www.ddcrukum.gov.np

Duli is a Village Development Committee in Western Rukum District in Karnali Province of western Nepal. At the time of the 2011 Nepal census it had a population of 4837 people residing in 851 individual households.
