= Triveni Rural Municipality, Western Rukum =

Triveni (Nepali: त्रिवेणी गाउँपालिका) is a rural municipality located in Western Rukum District of Karnali Province of Nepal.

== Demographics ==
At the time of the 2011 Nepal census, Tribeni Rural Municipality had a population of 19,404. Of those, 99.8% spoke Nepali, 0.1% Urdu as their first language and 0.1% other languages as their first language.

In terms of ethnicity/caste, 68.5% were Chhetri, 11.7% Magar, 11.6% Kami, 3.5% Damai/Dholi, 2.9% Thakuri, 1.1% Hill Brahmin, 0.3% Badi, 0.2% Sarki, 0.1% Musalman and 0.1% others.

In terms of religion, 99.3% were Hindu, 0.5% Christian and 0.1% Muslim.

In terms of literacy, 68.1% could read and write, 1.6% could only read and 30.3% could neither read nor write.
