= Ghetma =

Ghetma घेतमा
- Village development committee
- Motto(s): Nativeland and our Parents are Greater than Heaven
- Location in Nepal
- Coordinates: 28.74°N 82.32°E
- Country: Nepal
- Zone: Rapti Zone
- District: Rukum District

Population (2011)
  - Total: 4,789 Male                           = 2,348 Female                         = 2,441 Total Households = 862
- Time zone: UTC+5:45 (Nepal Time)
- Area code: +977-88
- Website: www.ddcrukum.gov.np

Ghetma is a village in Rukum district, western Nepal.

== Demographics ==
The 2011 National Population and Housing Census recorded 4,789: 2,348 men and 2,441 women.

== Education ==
Students attend Shree Adarsh Higher Secondary School Ghetma, Rukum. Each ward has primary schools including three lower secondary schools.

== Geography ==
Ghetma is located on the bank of the Thuli Bheri River. The jungle of Ward No.1 contains a locally famous cave called Saattale Guffa.

== Administration ==
In the past, it was a part of Aathbis DandaGaun VDC which used to occupy two wards.
