= Arma, Nepal =

Arma Danda Rukum सानीभेरी गाउँपालिका१०अर्मा डाँडा रुकुम (पश्चिम) MANAGEMENT = KHIMRAJ KHADKA 2019
- Village development committee
- Nickname: व्यवस्थापन =खिमराज खड्का 2019
- Location in Nepal
- Coordinates: 28.63°N 82.35°E
- Country: Nepal
- Province: Karnali Province
- District: Western Rukum District

Population (2011)
  - Total: 4,022
- Time zone: UTC+5:45 (Nepal Time)
- Area code: +977-88
- Website: www.ddcrukum.gov.np

Rukum Arma danda is a village development committee in Western Rukum District in Karnali Province of western Nepal. At the time of the 2011 Nepal census it had a population of 4022 people living in 720 individual households.
