= Musikot, Western Rukum =

Municipality in Karnali Province, Nepal

Musikot मुसिकोट
- Municipality नगरपालिका
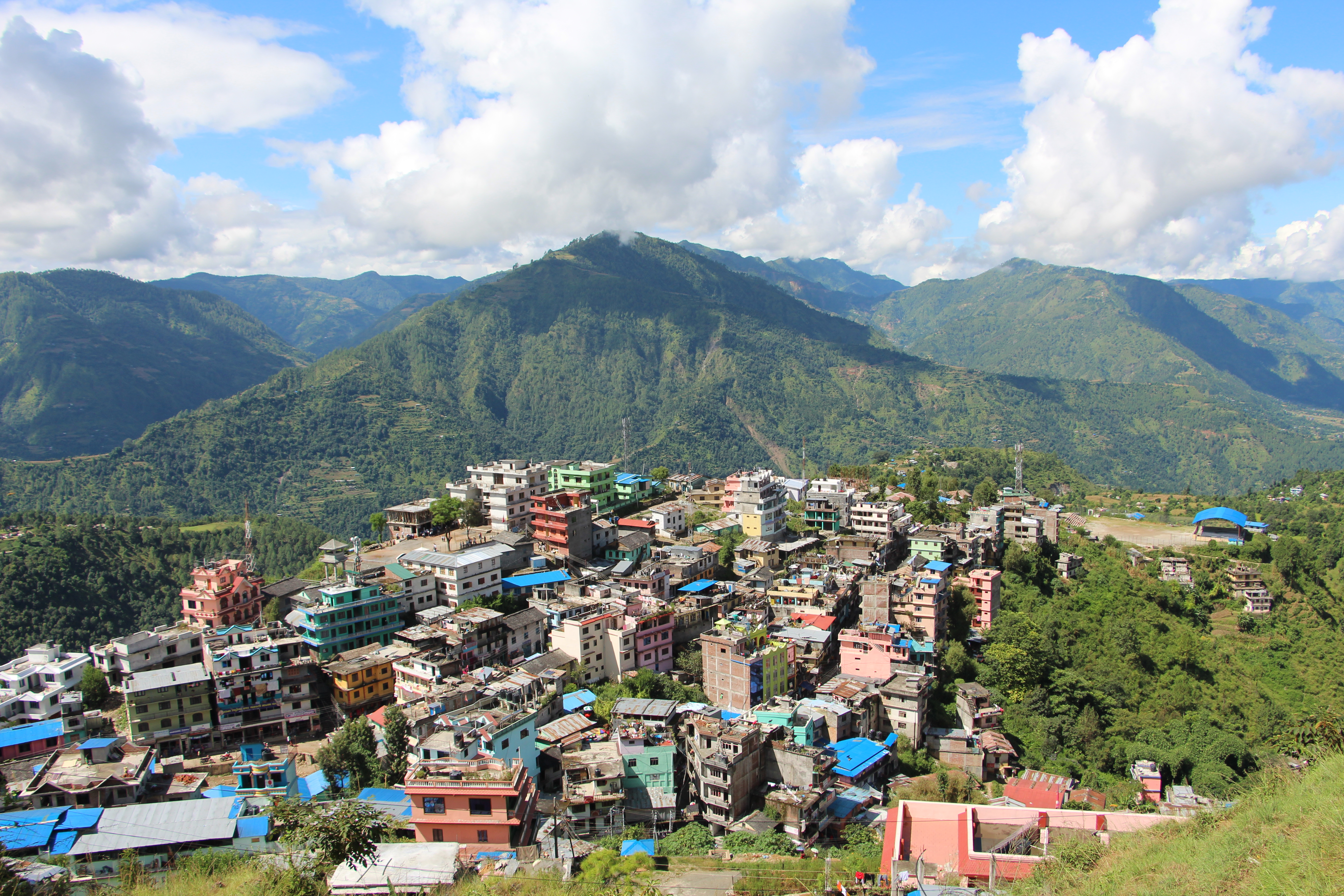
- Musikot

- Location in Nepal
- Coordinates: 28.63°N 82.49°E
- Country: Nepal
- Province: Karnali
- District: Western Rukum
- Established: 2 December 2014

Government
  - Mayor: Mahendra KC (NC)
  - Deputy Mayor: Bimal Kumar Pun Magar (CPN (US))

Area
  - Total: 136.06 km^{2} (52.53 sq mi)

Population (2011)
  - Total: 32,939
  - Density: 242.09/km^{2} (627.01/sq mi)
- Time zone: UTC+5:45 (Nepal Time)
- Website: http://musikotmunrukum.gov.np/

Musikot (Nepali: मुसिकोट) is a municipality and the district headquarter of Western Rukum District in Karnali Province of Nepal that was established as Musikot Khalanga on 2 December 2014 by merging the two former Village development committees Musikot and Khalanga. From 2014 until 2018, Musikot was called Musikot Khalanga and until 2017 served as the district headquarter of Rukum District. It lies on the bank of Sani Bheri River. It borders with Eastern Rukum in the east, Sanibheri rural municipality in the west, Banfikot rural municipality in the north and Tribeni rural municipality and Rolpa district in the south.

Once a red fort of CPN (Maoist Centre), Musikot is now ruled by Nepali Congress since the year 2022 and Maoists have finally lost both mayoral and deputy mayoral post.

== Demographics ==
At the time of the 2011 Nepal census, Musikot Municipality had a population of 33,882. Of these, 98.9% spoke Nepali, 0.5% Magar-Kham, 0.4% Magar and 0.1% other languages as their first language.

In terms of ethnicity/caste, 57.8% were Chhetri, 18.4% Magar, 10.9% Kami, 3.9% Damai/Dholi, 3.0% Thakuri, 2.9% Hill Brahmin, 1.7% Sarki, 0.3% Sanyasi/Dasnami, 0.3% Badi, 0.2% Newar, 0.1% other Dalit, 0.1% Kumal, 0.1% Musalman, 0.1% other Terai, 0.1% Thakali, 0.1% Tharu and 0.1% others.

In terms of religion, 98.4% were Hindu, 1.3% Christian, 0.1% Buddhist, 0.1% Muslim, 0.1% Prakriti and 0.1% others.

In terms of literacy, 71.9% could read and write, 2.0% could only read and 26.1% could neither read nor write.

== Media ==
To promote local culture Musikot has one FM radio station, Radio Sani Bheri F.M. - 89.2 MHz, which is a Community radio Station.

== Transportation ==
Rukum Salle Airport lies in Old-Musikot offering flights to Nepalgunj and Kathmandu. Rapti Highway links Musikot to the Terai region of Nepal.
