= Kotjahari =

Kotjahari कोटजहारी
- Village development committee
- Location in Nepal
- Coordinates: 28.66°N 82.24°E
- Country: Nepal
- Province: Karnali Province
- District: Western Rukum District

Population (2011)
  - Total: 5,125
- Time zone: UTC+5:45 (Nepal Time)
- Area code: +977-88
- Website: www.ddcrukum.gov.np

Kotjahari is a village development committee in Western Rukum District in Karnali Province of western Nepal. At the time of the 1991 Nepal census it had a population of 5125 people living in 1058 individual households.
