= Ranmamekot =

Ranma Maikot रन्मामैकोट
- Village development committee
- Interactive map of Ranma Maikot
- Coordinates: 28.46°N 82.49°E
- Country: Nepal
- Province: Lumbini Province
- District: Eastern Rukum District

Population (2011)
  - Total: 3,777
- Time zone: UTC+5:45 (Nepal Time)
- Area code: +977-88
- Website: www.ddcrukum.gov.np

Ranma Maikot is a village development committee in Eastern Rukum District in Lumbini Province of western Nepal. At the time of the 2011 Nepal census it had a population of 3777 people living in 774 individual households.
