= Morawang =

Morawang मोरावाङ
- Village development committee
- Location in Nepal
- Coordinates: 28.58°N 82.69°E
- Country: Nepal
- Province: Lumbini Province
- District: Eastern Rukum District

Population (2011)
  - Total: 2,442
- Time zone: UTC+5:45 (Nepal Time)
- Area code: +977-88
- Website: www.ddcrukum.gov.np

Morawang is a village development committee in Eastern Rukum District in Lumbini Province of western Nepal. At the time of the 2011 Nepal census it had a population of 2442 people living in 512 individual households.
