= Kankri =

Kankri काँक्री
- Village development committee
- Location in Nepal
- Coordinates: 28.53°N 82.79°E
- Country: Nepal
- Province: Lumbini Province
- District: Eastern Rukum District

Population (2011)
  - Total: 4,693
- Time zone: UTC+5:45 (Nepal Time)

Kankri is a village development committee in Eastern Rukum District in Lumbini Province of western Nepal. At the time of the 1991 Nepal census it had a population of 4210 people living in 851 individual households.
