= Duli, Hamadan =

Duli دولي
- Village
- Location within Iran
- Coordinates: 35°12′36″N 48°32′06″E
- Country: Iran
- Province: Hamadan
- County: Kabudarahang
- Bakhsh: Central
- Rural District: Sardaran

Population (2006)
  - Total: 486
- Time zone: UTC+3:30 (IRST)
  - Summer (DST): UTC+4:30 (IRDT)

Duli (Persian: دولي, also Romanized as Dūlī) is a village in Sardaran Rural District, in the Central District of Kabudarahang County, Hamadan Province, Iran. At the 2006 census, its population was 486, in 122 families.
