= District Coordination Committee =

District Coordination Committee जिल्ला समन्वय समिति
- Also known as: DCC
- Districts of Nepal governed by the Coordination Committee
- Location: Nepal
- Created: 17 March 2017

The District Coordination Committee (Nepali: जिल्ला समन्वय समिति, abbreviation: DCC) was formed on March 14, 2017, to replace the existing district development committee. Each of the 77 districts in Nepal have their own district coordination committees in.

The Head of a district development committee is elected by the district assembly. The government also appoints a Local Development Officer in each district development committee who heads the DCC in absence of an elected head or deputy head.

The DCC acts as an executive to the district Assembly. The DCC coordinates with the Provincial Assembly to establish coordination between the Provincial Assembly and rural municipalities and municipalities and to settle disputes, if any, of political nature. It also maintains coordination between the provincial and Federal government and among the local bodies in the district. It also monitors development within the district.

== See also ==
- District Administration in Nepal
- Districts of Nepal
