= Liwang, Rolpa =

Rolpa Lungri रोल्पा लुङग्रीं
- Municipality
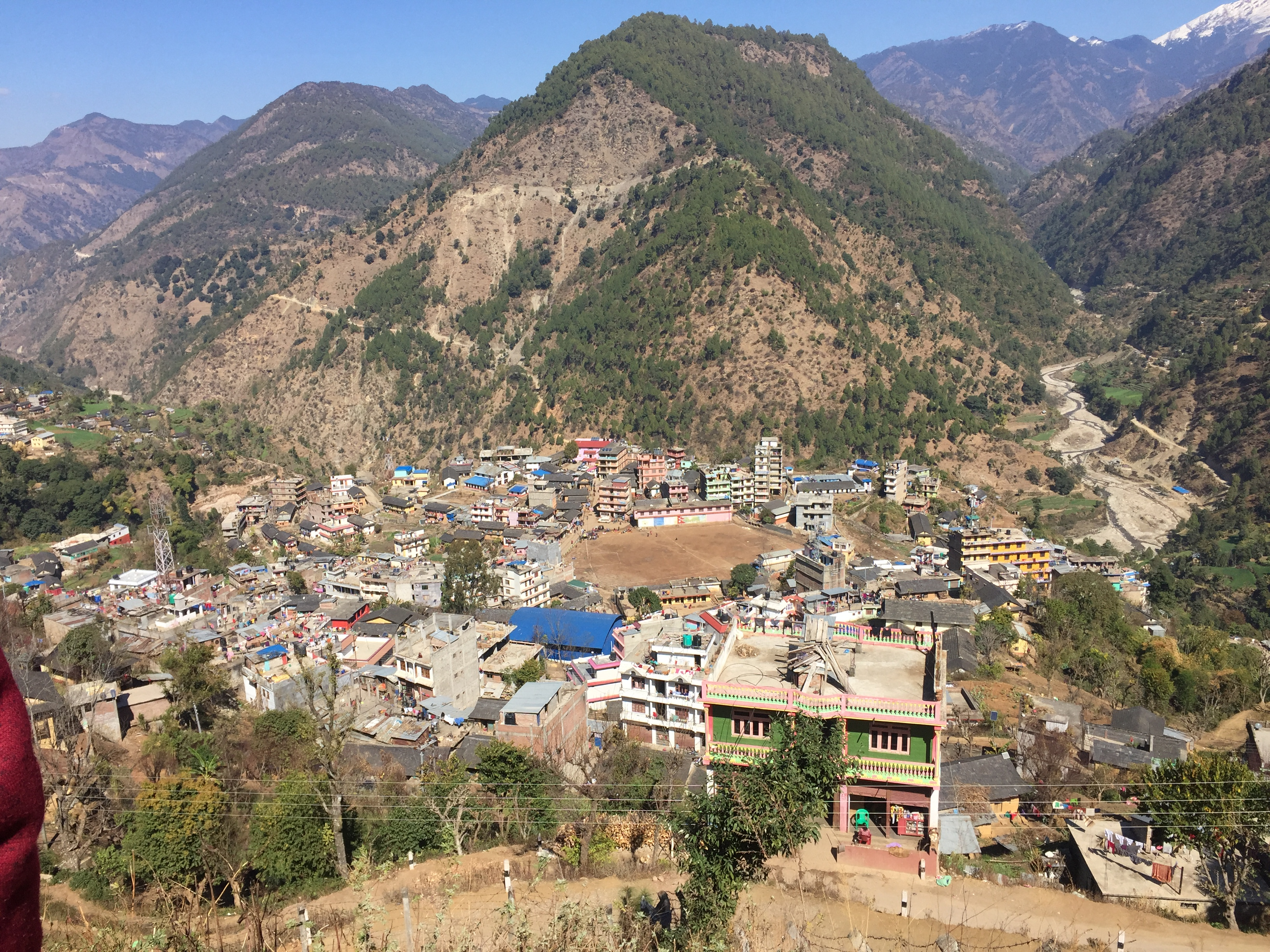

- Location in Nepal Rolpa Lungri (Nepal)
- Coordinates: 28°18′N 82°38′E
- Country: Nepal
- Province: Lumbini Province
- District: Rolpa District

Government
  - Chairman: Bharat Kumar Thapa

Population (2011)
  - Total: 10,417
- Time zone: UTC+5:45 (NST)
- Postal code: 22100
- Area code: 086
- Website: www.liwangmun.gov.np

Liwang is district headquarters and municipality in Rolpa District in Lumbini Province of southwestern Nepal. At the time of the 1991 Nepal census it had a population of 8425.

== Media ==
To Promote local culture Liwang has one FM radio station Radio Rolpa FM - 93.8 MHz Which is a Community radio Station. Liwang has three local radio. Community Radio Rolpa FM 93.8mhz, Community Radio Jaljala 96.4mhz and Community Radio Malashree 100.5mhz
