= Tom Arma =

American photographer and author

Tom Arma is a New York–based photographer, costume designer and picture book author who specializes in baby photography and children's costumes. He has been called the "most published baby photographer in the world" in The New York Times and the "Armani of the kiddy costume world" on MSNBC.com.

== Background and career ==
Arma began his photographic career as a teenager at the New York Daily News, as their youngest staff photographer. At the Daily News, his assignments included political conventions, the Woodstock Music Festival, Beatles invasion, and President Richard Nixon.

Arma was reassigned to the New York Times Magazine where he photographed Clint Eastwood, Paul Newman, Jack Nicholson, and Michael Caine, among others. He then opened hid own studio for magazine and advertising work. He shot successful campaigns for Fortune 500 companies, as well as covers for Time Magazine, People Magazine, Money, French Photo, and Ladies Home Journal. In 1972 he began his work with babies. In the 1980s, his photos of costumed children were on magazine covers, including consecutive Christmas covers for Ladies Home Journal. He was the first person to publish a book solely of babies in costume.

Arma created a Please Save the Animals series of posters and greeting cards with babies dressed in animal outfits he designed. He also works on picture books and has authored 47 original books worldwide. The Harry N. Abrams company publishes his picture books.
