= Banphikot Rural Municipality =

Banphikot (Nepali: बाँफिकोट गाउँपालिका) is a rural municipality located in Western Rukum District of Karnali Province of Nepal. According to 2011 Census conducted by Central Bureau of Statistics (CBS), Banphikot Rural Municipality had total population of 18,696. Banphikot Rural Municipality was established in 2015 through the merging five the former Village development committees of Aathbiskot, Pipal, Duli (ward no. 4, 5 &6) and Magma (ward no. 1-6 & 9). This Municipality shares boarder with Sisne Rural Municipality (East Rukum district) in the East, Sani Bheri Rural Municipality in the West, Aathbiskot Municipality in the North, and Musikot Municipality in the South.

== Demographics ==
At the time of the 2011 Nepal census, Banphikot Rural Municipality had a population of 18,696. Of these, 99.8% spoke Nepali and 0.1% other languages as their first language.

In terms of ethnicity/caste, 55.5% were Chhetri, 12.0% Kami, 9.7% Magar, 8.9% Thakuri, 7.2% Hill Brahmin, 4.2% Damai/Dholi, 1.4% Sarki, 0.4% Sanyasi/Dasnami, 0.2% Gaine, 0.1% Badi, 0.1% other Dalit, 0.1% Gurung and 0.1% others.

In terms of religion, 99.1% were Hindu, 0.4% Christian, 0.2% Buddhist and 0.3% others.

In terms of literacy, 61.0% could read and write, 3.1% could only read and 35.8% could neither read nor write.
