= Pokhara (harvestman) =

Scientific classification
- Domain: Eukaryota
- Kingdom: Animalia
- Phylum: Arthropoda
- Subphylum: Chelicerata
- Class: Arachnida
- Order: Opiliones
- Family: Sclerosomatidae
- Genus: Pokhara; Suzuki, 1970

Species
- Pokhara kathmandica Martens, 1987; Pokhara lineata Suzuki, 1970; Pokhara minuta Martens, 1987; Pokhara occidentalis Martens, 1987; Pokhara quadriconica Martens, 1987; Pokhara trisulensis Martens, 1987; Pokhara uenoi Martens, 1987

Genus of harvestmen/daddy longlegs

Pokhara is a genus of harvestmen in the family Sclerosomatidae from Nepal.

== Species ==
- Pokhara kathmandica J. Martens, 1987
- Pokhara lineata Suzuki, 1970
- Pokhara minuta J. Martens, 1987
- Pokhara occidentalis J. Martens, 1987
- Pokhara quadriconica J. Martens, 1987
- Pokhara trisulensis J. Martens, 1987
- Pokhara uenoi J. Martens, 1987
