= Sani Bheri Rural Municipality =

Rural municipality in Western Rukum District, Karnali Province, Nepal

Sani Bheri (Nepali: सानी भेरी गाउँपालिका) is a rural municipality located in Western Rukum District of Karnali Province of Nepal.

== Demographics ==
At the time of the 2011 Nepal census, Sani Bheri Rural Municipality had a population of 22,194. Of those, 98.8% spoke Nepali, 1.1% Magar and 0.1% other languages as their first language.

In terms of ethnicity/caste, 58.1% were Chhetri, 20.3% Magar, 13.1% Kami, 4.2% Damai/Dholi, 2.7% Thakuri, 0.7% Sarki, 0.6% Hill Brahmin, 0.1% Sonar, 0.1% other Terai and 0.2% others.

In terms of religion, 95.8% were Hindu, 2.3% Buddhist, 1.2% Prakriti, 0.6% Christian and 0.1% others.

In terms of literacy, 61.8% could read and write, 3.8% could only read and 34.4% could neither read nor write.
