= Pipariya, Balaghat =

Coordinates: 21.844°N 79.992°E

Pipariya
- Location within India
- Country: India
- State: Madhya Pradesh
- District: Balaghat

Languages
- Time zone: UTC+5:30 (IST)

Pipariya is a village in the Balaghat District of Madhya Pradesh, India.

Its postal code is 481332 India, and Gram Panchayat is Pipariya.

As of the 2011 census, it had a population of 1573.

The nearest town is Waraseoni (13 km).

Pipariya is surrounded by agriculture land, forest and water reserves, and some tourist visitor locations:

- Bakram Baba - A small hill with an ancient rock in the form of a temple. This place has been worshiped by local tribals and they must visit this place once in a year. Distance from Pipariya: 3 km.
- Ramrama Hill - A Shiva Home is situated on the hill of Ramrama. This place has Lord Shiva temple. Many devotees visit this place regularly, especially during the Hindu festival Mahashivratri. Distance from Pipariya - 7 km.
- Katangjhari water reserve - Water tank covers a surface area of 0.41 km^{2} and depth of 3 meters. The tank has 4 km shore. Distance from Pipariya is 4 km.
- Ramrama Forest - Ramrama forest is a hiking destination. Distance from Pipariya: 6 km
