= Balthazar Armas =

Venezuelan artist

- Balthazar Armas
- Born: Balthazar Armas; 1941; Caracas, Venezuela
- Died: January 1, 2015 (aged 74); Caracas, Venezuela
- Education: Instituto de Diseño Fundación Neumann-INCE; Centro de Enseñanza Gráfica (CEGRA); Self-taught artist
- Known for: Painting, engraving, graphic arts
- Notable work: Andé Andé (2003), Botánica (2007), Sobre el Vuelo (2007)
- Style: Contemporary figurative art, postmodernism
- Movement: Latin American modernism, social realism
- Awards: Havana Biennial, Library of Congress recognition, Art Museum of the Americas, Washington D.C., Premio Braulio Salazar, Salón Arturo Michelena

Balthazar Armas. "La Escena", Primer Premio II Salón Nacional de Grabado

Balthazar Armas (Caracas, Venezuela, 1941 – 2015) is considered one of the pioneers of the contemporary figurative art movement in Latin America, where the industrial and urban influences in his paintings make them both approachable and distinctive. His most recent work exhibits a postmodern influence, reflected in the presence of social narratives, indigenism, and social criticism. His most recent series, Andé Andé (2003), Botánica (2007), and Sobre el Vuelo (2007), convey the energy and mysticism of the people and environments of Latin American cultures.

Born in Caracas, Venezuela, he began as a self-taught artist in the 1950s and participated in the experimental theater movement at the Academy of Dramatic Art Carmen Antillano in Caracas. He later studied at the Neumann Institute of Graphic Arts and the Center for Graphic Studies (CEGRA) with a focus on engraving. Balthazar's first solo exhibitions date back to 1966, and he has since participated in numerous design, engraving, and art exhibitions across Latin America, Europe, and the United States, including at MOKA Gallery in Chicago, Illinois.

His awards and recognitions includes the Pratt Institute, Havana biennial, IE in Norway, Library of Congress, Art Museum of the Americas in Washington D.C, IE Gracovia, Poland, Premio "Braulio Salazar" Salón de Artes Arturo Michelena, Venezuela, and more.

== Education ==
- Self-taught Artist. 1953/58. Caracas.
- Acting and Stage Scene. Academia de Arte Dramático Carmen Antillano. 1962/64. Caracas.
- Drawing. Instituto Académico de Bellas Artes 62/66. Caracas.
- Industrial Design. Instituto de Diseño, Fundación Newmann-INCE. 1967/70. Caracas.
- Graphic Arts. Specialty: Engraving. Centro de Enseñanza Gráfica, CEGRA. 1978/80. Caracas.

== Academic contributions ==
- CEGRA Centro de Enseñanza Gráfica, Caracas.
- Language, Communication y Visual Thought. 1977.
- Hand-made Paper Crafting. 1978.
- Paper Conservation and Paper-based Art. 1979.
- TAGA Taller de Artistas Gráficos Asociados, Caracas. Colografía. 1979
- Museo de Arte Moderno de Latinoamérica (OEA) Washington DC. 1982.
- The Path of Art in Latinoamérica
