= Pipalia Hasnabad =

- village
- Location within Madhya Pradesh Location within India
- Coordinates: 23.6345362°N 77.38699°E
- Country: India
- State: Madhya Pradesh
- District: Bhopal
- Tehsil: Berasia
- Elevation: 482 m (1,581 ft)

Population (2011)
  - Total: 1,694
- Time zone: UTC+5:30 (IST)
- ISO 3166 code: MP-IN
- 2011 census code: 482229

Pipalia Hasnabad is a village in the Bhopal district of Madhya Pradesh, India. It is located in the Berasia tehsil.

== Demographics ==
According to the 2011 census of India, Pipalia Hasnabad has 287 households. The effective literacy rate (i.e. the literacy rate of population excluding children aged 6 and below) is 54.56%.

Demographics (2011 Census)
	Total	Male	Female
Population	1694	855	839
Children aged below 6 years	400	209	191
Scheduled caste	49	26	23
Scheduled tribe	0	0	0
Literates	706	414	292
Workers (all)	504	378	126
Main workers (total)	304	289	15
Main workers: Cultivators	78	75	3
Main workers: Agricultural labourers	107	103	4
Main workers: Household industry workers	0	0	0
Main workers: Other	119	111	8
Marginal workers (total)	200	89	111
Marginal workers: Cultivators	4	2	2
Marginal workers: Agricultural labourers	145	45	100
Marginal workers: Household industry workers	0	0	0
Marginal workers: Others	51	42	9
Non-workers	1190	477	713
