= 16S rRNA (guanine1405-N7)-methyltransferase =

Class of enzymes

16S rRNA (guanine^{1405}-N^{7})-methyltransferase

Identifiers
- EC no.: 2.1.1.179

Databases
- IntEnz: IntEnz view
- BRENDA: BRENDA entry
- ExPASy: NiceZyme view
- KEGG: KEGG entry
- MetaCyc: metabolic pathway
- PRIAM: profile
- PDB structures: RCSB PDB PDBe PDBsum
Search
- PMC: articles
- PubMed: articles
- NCBI: proteins

16S rRNA (guanine^{1405}-N^{7})-methyltransferase (EC 2.1.1.179, methyltransferase Sgm, m7G1405 Mtase, Sgm Mtase, Sgm, sisomicin-gentamicin methyltransferase, sisomicin-gentamicin methylase, GrmA, RmtB, RmtC, ArmA) is an enzyme with systematic name S-adenosyl-L-methionine:16S rRNA (guanine^{1405}-N^{7})-methyltransferase. This enzyme catalyses the following chemical reaction

S-adenosyl-L-methionine + guanine^{1405} in 16S rRNA $\rightleftharpoons$ S-adenosyl-L-homocysteine + 7-methylguanine^{1405} in 16S rRNA

The enzyme specifically methylates guanine^{1405} at N^{7} in 16S rRNA.
