= Pipalia Chhaparband =

- village
- Location within Madhya Pradesh Location within India
- Coordinates: 23.3584801°N 77.3195196°E
- Country: India
- State: Madhya Pradesh
- District: Bhopal
- Tehsil: Huzur
- Elevation: 501 m (1,644 ft)

Population (2011)
  - Total: 284
- Time zone: UTC+5:30 (IST)
- ISO 3166 code: MP-IN
- 2011 census code: 482360

Pipalia Chhaparband is a village in the Bhopal district of Madhya Pradesh, India. It is located in the Huzur tehsil and the Phanda block.

== Demographics ==
According to the 2011 census of India, Pipalia Chhaparband has 64 households. The effective literacy rate (i.e. the literacy rate of population excluding children aged 6 and below) is 64.63%.

Demographics (2011 Census)
	Total	Male	Female
Population	284	153	131
Children aged below 6 years	38	21	17
Scheduled caste	135	65	70
Scheduled tribe	0	0	0
Literates	159	104	55
Workers (all)	77	63	14
Main workers (total)	51	44	7
Main workers: Cultivators	16	13	3
Main workers: Agricultural labourers	30	28	2
Main workers: Household industry workers	0	0	0
Main workers: Other	5	3	2
Marginal workers (total)	26	19	7
Marginal workers: Cultivators	3	2	1
Marginal workers: Agricultural labourers	23	17	6
Marginal workers: Household industry workers	0	0	0
Marginal workers: Others	0	0	0
Non-workers	207	90	117
