= Rukum Salle Airport =

Airport in Nepal

Salle Airport सल्ले विमानस्थल
- IATA: none; ICAO: VNSL

Summary
- Airport type: Public
- Serves: Musikot Khalanga, Nepal
- Elevation AMSL: 5,184 ft / 1,580 m
- Coordinates: 28°38′14″N 82°26′58″E

Map
- Location of airport in Nepal

Runways
Direction	Length		Surface
Direction	m	ft	Surface
16/34	580	1,903	Asphalt

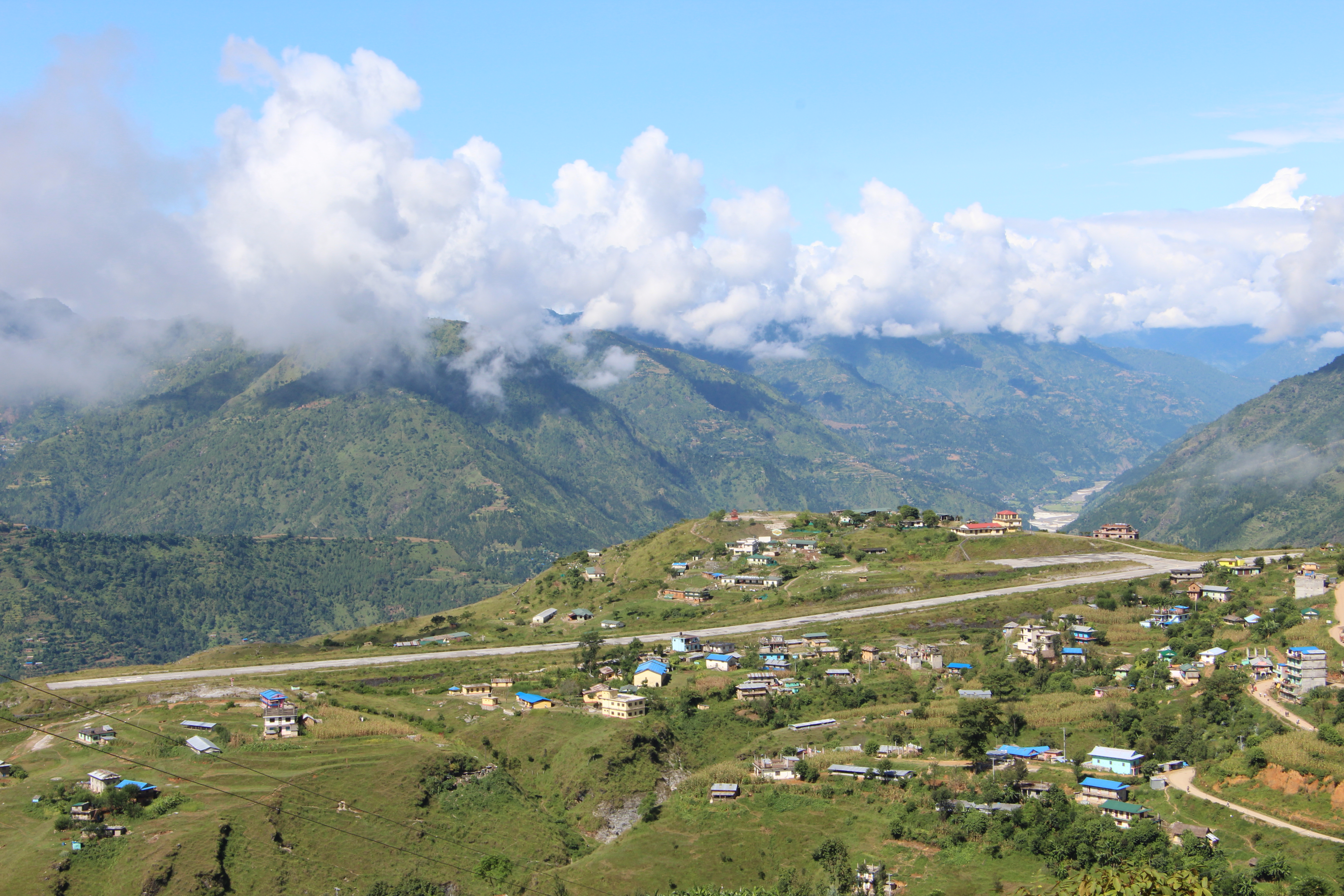
Rukum Salle airport

Salle Airport (ICAO: VNSL), also known as Musikot Airport, is a domestic airport located in Musikot serving Western Rukum District, a district in Karnali Province in Nepal. It is the main tourist gateway to Mount Sisne.

== History ==
The airport was originally opened in 1994. The airport was renovated and the runway blacktopped in 2014 after previously only having a grass/clay runway.

== Facilities ==
The airport resides at an elevation of 5,184 feet (1,580 m) above mean sea level. It has one asphalt runway which is 580 metres (1,903 ft) in length.

== Airlines and destinations ==
Airlines	Destinations
Nepal Airlines	Kathmandu, Nepalgunj
