= District Development Committee =

District level governing body in Nepal

The District Development Committee, popularly DDC, is a Committee of Delhi Legislative Assembly working for Development of Districts in Delhi.

== Structure ==
The current structure of the local governance in Nepal put DDCs to the body lower to the Ministerial level and above the Village Development Committee (VDC) and Municipalities in the same district. Ministry of Federal Affairs and Local Development (MoFALD) is the governing body for the DDCs.

There are 77 districts in Nepal and currently total of 3157 under the DDCs. Post constitution 2015 of Nepal, Districts will comprise Village Council and Municipalities only meaning no more VDCs forming a new governance structure in the country. All the DDC websites and their social media presence, specially Facebook, has been unified after the positioning of ICT Volunteers in the districts.

== Local officers ==
During this absence of legally elected local body representatives, Local Development Officer (LDO) appointed from MoFALD head each DDC and work closely in-line with the District Technical Office (DTO) while rest of the government offices in the district are the DDC's line agencies.
