= Western Rukum District =

District in Karnali Province, Nepal

Western Rukum District पश्चिमी रुकुम
- District
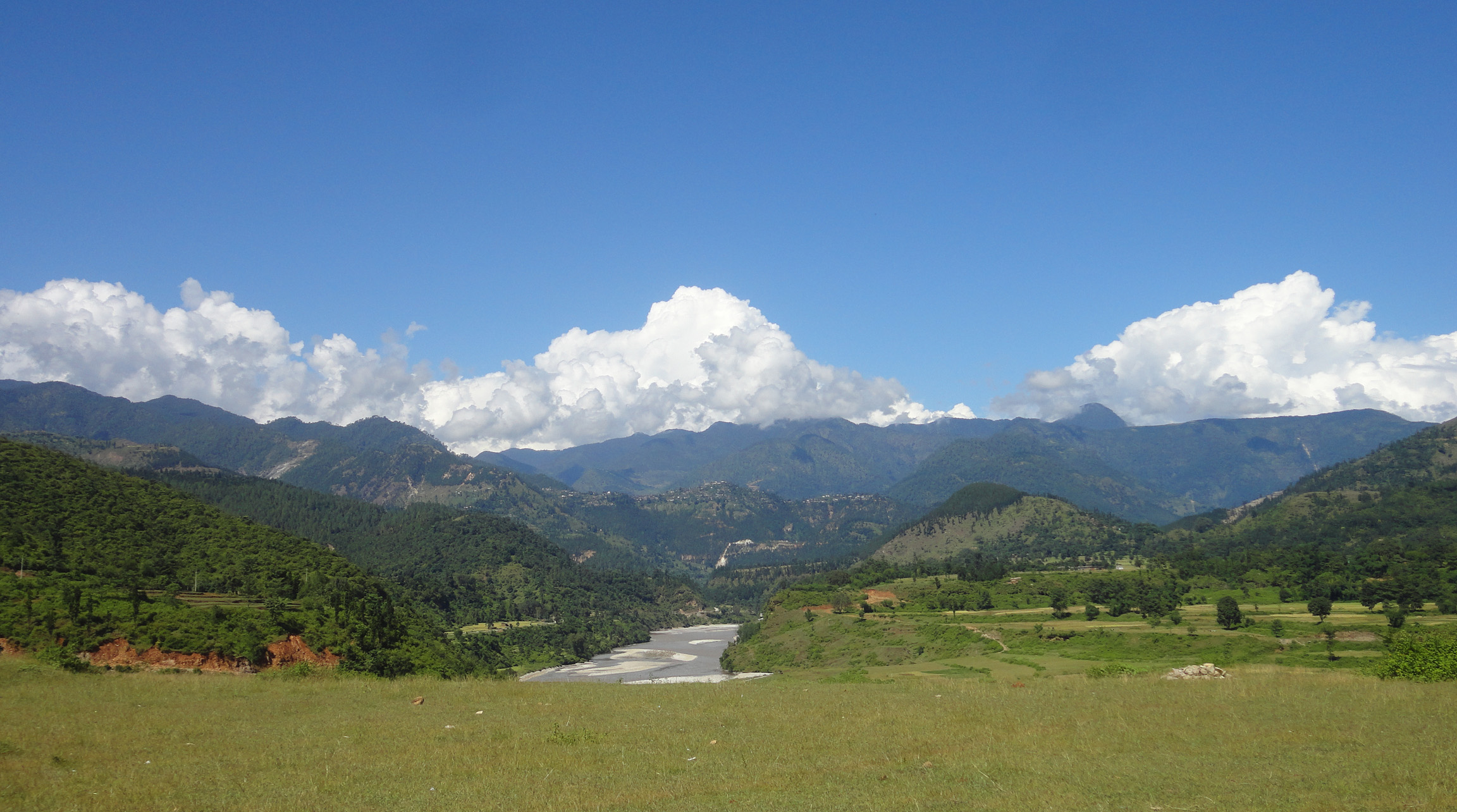
- Chaurjahari

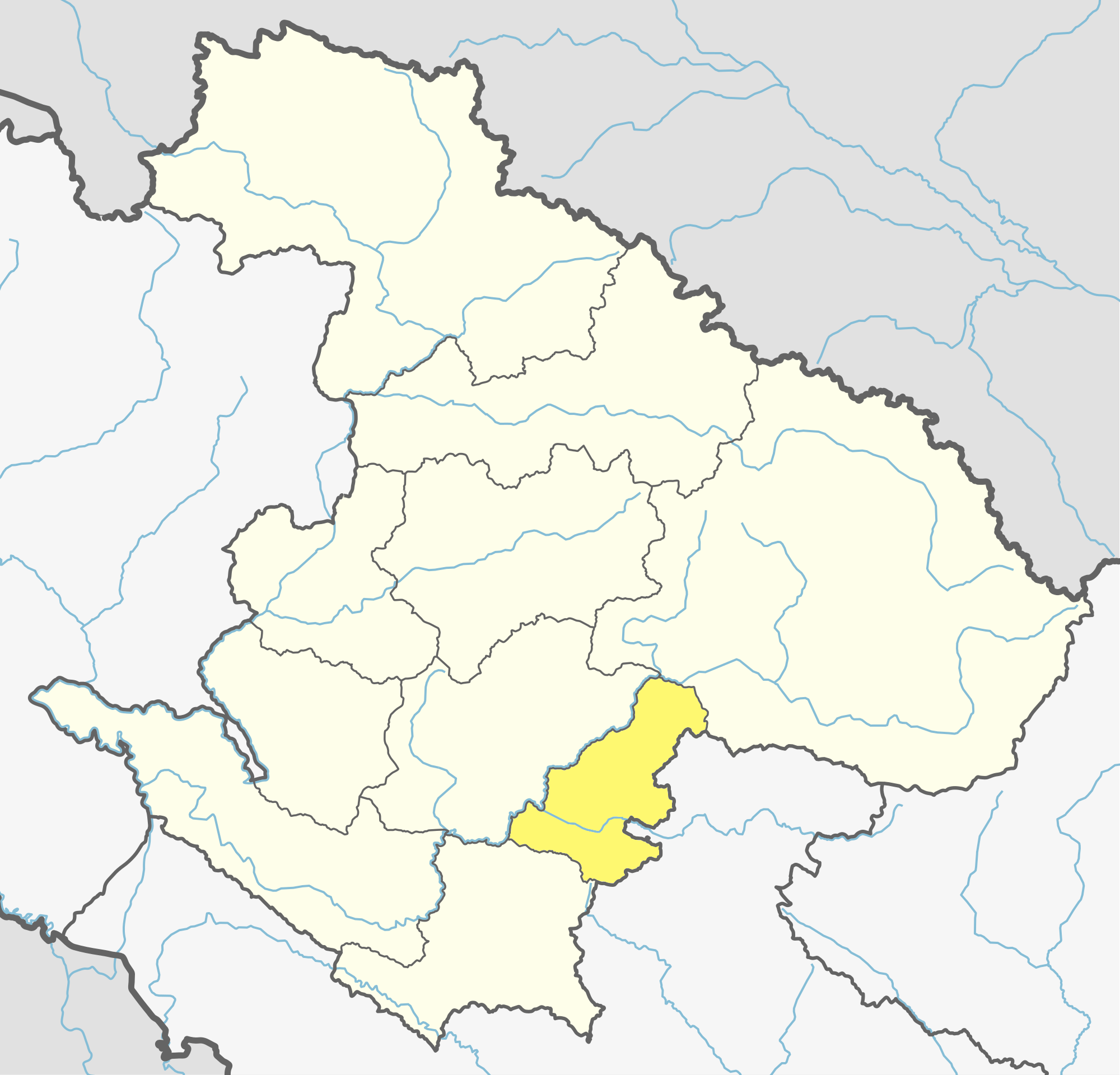
- Location of West Rukum District (dark yellow) in Karnali

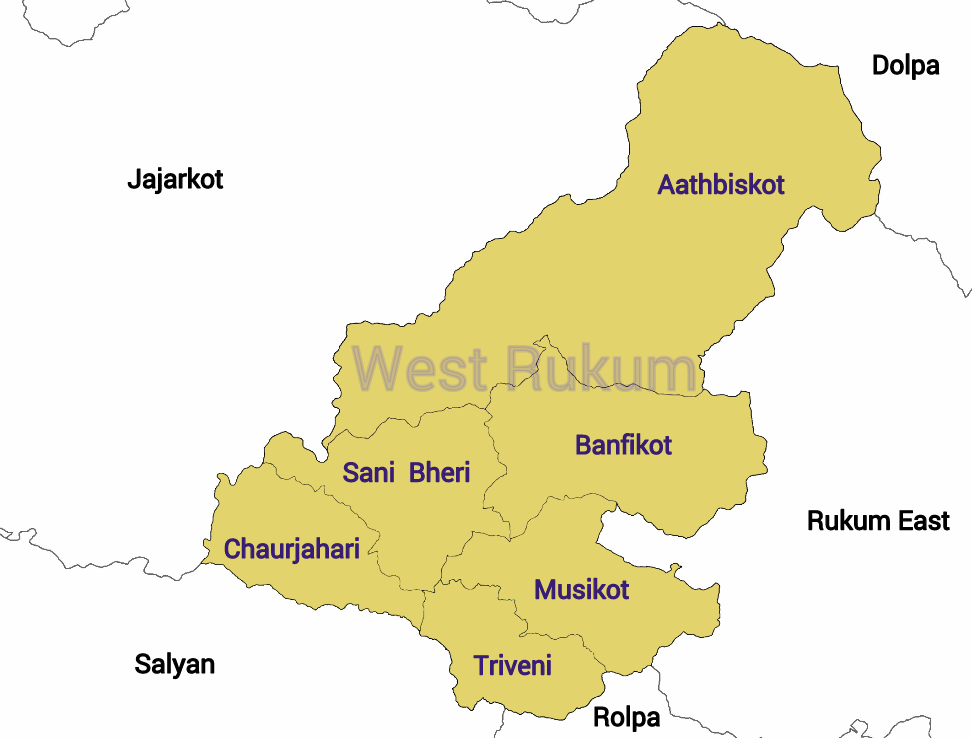
- Division of West Rukum
- Coordinates: 28.63°N 82.49°E
- Country: Nepal
- Province: Karnali Province
- Established: 2015
- Admin HQ.: Musikot

Government
  - Type: Coordination committee
  - Body: DCC, Western Rukum

Area
  - Total: 1,213.49 km^{2} (468.53 sq mi)

Population
  - Total: 154,272
  - Density: 127.131/km^{2} (329.267/sq mi)
- Time zone: UTC+05:45 (NPT)
- Website: dccrukumwest.gov.np

Western Rukum (Nepali: पश्चिमी रुकुम) a part of Karnali Province, is one of the seventy-seven districts of Nepal. Musikot is the headquarter of the district.

Formally Western Rukum District was part of Rukum District, which divided into two districts Western Rukum and Eastern Rukum after the state's reconstruction of administrative divisions as of 20 September 2015.

The total area of Western Rukum District is 1,213.49 square kilometres (468.53 sq mi) and total population of this district as of 2011 Nepal census is 154,272 individuals.

Located in the western hill region, Western Rukum is a hill district with many valleys. It is bordered with five districts: Eastern Rukum and Rolpa district of Lumbini province on the east, Salyan district to the south, Jajarkot district on the west, and Dolpa district to the north.

== Demographics ==
Historical population
Census year	Pop.	±% p.a.
1981	98,662	—
1991	115,888	+1.62%
2001	140,387	+1.94%
2011	155,383	+1.02%
2021	166,354	+0.68%
Source: Citypopulation

At the time of the 2021 Nepal census, Western Rukum District had a population of 166,740. 9.92% of the population is under 5 years of age. It has a literacy rate of 75.74% and a sex ratio of 1056 females per 1000 males. 99,143 (59.46%) lived in municipalities.

Castes/ethnic groups in Western Rukum district (2021)
1. Chhetri (53.1%)
2. Kami (14.8%)
3. Magar (13.8%)
4. Thakuri (5.91%)
5. Bahun (3.73%)
6. Damai (3.66%)
7. Sarki (2.13%)
8. Dasnami (1.06%)
9. Other Hill Janjati (1.02%)
10. Others (0.83%)

Khas people make up a majority of the population with 85% of the population. Chhetris form an outright majority in the district with 53% of the population, while Khas Dalits make up 21% of the population. Hill Janjatis make up 15% of the population, of which Magars are 14% of the population.

Languages of Western Rukum district (2021)
1. Nepali (98.3%)
2. Magar Kham (1.22%)
3. Others (0.43%)

At the time of the 2021 census, 98.35% of the population spoke Nepali and 1.22% Magar Kham as their first language. In 2011, 99.3% of the population spoke Nepali as their first language.

Religion in Western Rukum District (2021)
Religion	Percent
Hinduism	97.53%
Christianity	1.23%
Buddhism	0.61%
Prakriti	0.57%
Other or not stated	0.06%

== Transport ==
Though Western Rukum is considered a remote district, transportation has been rapidly expanded after the Second People's Movement of 2006. With recent building of roads, bus and jeep services are available with links to the southern plains and major cities including Kathmandu. Two airports offer safe but rudimentary facilities for passenger flights, mainly from Nepalganj and Kathmandu.

The Rapti Highway was under construction (as of 2010) to connect Musikot to Salyan Khalanga, Tulsipur, and Mahendra Highway to the south. On the other hand, Nepal's dream project "Mid-Hill Highway" is under construction.

=== Rapti Highway ===
It is about a four-hour bus ride from Dang Tulsipur to Western Rukum Musikot.

=== Mid-Hill Highway ===
Mid-Hill Highway is under construction. It is a national pride project that passes through 12 zones, 24 districts, and 215 VDCs(old divisions). With a total length of 1,767 km, the highway connects Chiyo Bhanjyang of Panchthar district in the east with Jhulaghat of Baitadi district in the west.

The bus ride from Kathmandu takes up to 24 hours to Musikot.

=== Airports ===
The two airports in Western Rukum are in Chaurjahari (Nepali: चौरजहारी) and Salle (Nepali: सल्ले).

Chaurjahari Airport lies near the Bheri River, 762 m above sea level and accessible by footpaths and horse trails only, with a grass runway 850 m long and 30 m wide. It was the primary mode of travel to Rukum for government, NGO personnel, aid workers and backpackers before the civil war. During the conflict the security situation deteriorated and the local police station was shut down. The airport has 10 aircraft parking spaces.

The flight from Nepalganj to Rukum Salle airport takes 15–20 minutes.

Rukum Salle Airport lies near Musikot, the district headquarters. It is accessible by foot way and road transport since Rapti Highway has touched Salle airport. Its runway is 650 meters long with capability of parking of four aircraft.

The flight from Kathmandu to Rukum Salle airport takes about 90 minutes, while the flight from Nepalganj takes about 20 minutes.

The district is divided into 3 urban municipalities and 3 rural municipalities

=== Urban municipalities ===
- Musikot
- Chaurjahari
- Aathbiskot

=== Rural municipalities ===
- Banphikot
- Tribeni
- Sani Bheri
