= List of districts of Nepal =

District
- Category: Jilla
- Location: Nepal
- Created: pre-1816
- Number: 77 (as of 20 September 2015)
- Populations: 2,041,587 – 5,658
- Areas: 7,889 square kilometres (3,046 mi^{2}) - 119 square kilometres (46 sq mi)
- Government: District Coordination Committee
- Subdivisions: Urban Municipality; Rural Municipality

Districts in Nepal are second level of administrative divisions after provinces. Districts are subdivided into municipalities and rural municipalities. There are seven provinces and 77 districts in Nepal.

There were total of 75 districts in Nepal until 2015, grouped into 14 Zones and 5 Development Regions. After the adoption of federalism in 2015, the existing Zones and Development Regions were dissolved. Nawalparasi District and Rukum District were respectively divided into Parasi District and Nawalpur District, and Eastern Rukum District and Western Rukum District, making total number of districts 77. (Note: The districts of Nawalparasi and Rukum were formally divided following the promulgation of the Constitution of Nepal in 2015. However, the division was implemented administratively only in 2017, following the restructuring of local governance and the local level elections, when the former 75 District Development Committees were replaced by 77 District Coordination Committees.) These 77 districts were regrouped into 7 provinces.

== District officials ==
District official include:

- Chief District Officer, an official under Ministry of Home Affairs is appointed by the government as the highest administrative officer in a district. The C.D.O is responsible for proper inspection of all the departments in a district such as health, education, security and all other government offices.
- District Coordination Committee acts as an executive to the District Assembly. The DCC coordinates with the Provincial Assembly to establish coordination between the Provincial Assembly and rural municipalities and municipalities and to settle disputes, if any, of political nature. It also maintains coordination between the provincial and Federal government and the local bodies in the district.

== History ==
During the time of king Rajendra Bir Bikram Shah and prime minister Bhimsen Thapa, Nepal was divided into 10 districts. All areas east of Dudhkoshi River were one district, Dhankuta.

=== Rana regime (1885–1951) ===
During the time of prime minister Bir Shumsher Jang Bahadur Rana (1885–1901), Nepal was divided into 32 districts and Doti, Palpa and Dhankuta were 3 gaunda (Nepali: गौंडा, "cantonment"). Hilly region had 20 districts and Terai had 12 districts.

The districts were categorized into Gaundas, Goswaras and Gadhis. Each had a headquarters and Badahakim (District Administrator) as its head. Kathmandu Valley was administered directly by Rana Prime Minister through Hajuriya General with additional Brigadier Generals for Lalitpur and Bhaktapur. The list of districts until 1951 are given below:

Districts until 1951
S.N.	District	Headquarters	Category	District Administrator
1	East No. 1	Chautara (initially Dhulikhel)	Militia Goswara	Badahakim
2	East No. 2	Ramechhap	Militia Goswara	Badahakim
3	East No. 3	Okhaldhunga	Militia Goswara	Badahakim
4	East No. 4	Bhojpur	Militia Goswara	Badahakim
5	Dhankuta	Dhankuta	Gaunda	Governor (General rank)
6	Ilam	Ilam	Gaunda	Governor (General rank)
7	Udayapur	Udayapur Gadhi	Gadhi	Badahakim
8	Sindhuli	Sindhuli Gadhi	Gadhi	Badahakim
9	Jhapa	Jhapa	Chhoti Goswara	Badahakim
10	Morang (Biratnagar)	Biratnagar (initially Rangeli)	Goswara	Badahakim
11	Saptari	Rajbiraj (initially Hanumannagar)	Goswara	Badahakim
12	Mahottari-Sarlahi	Jaleshwar	Goswara	Badahakim
13	Birgunj	Birgunj	Goswara	Badahakim
14	Kathmandu Valley	Kathmandu	Valley administration	Hajuriya General (with additional Brigadier Generals for Lalitpur and Bhaktapur)
15	Chisapani	Chisapani Gadhi	Gadhi	Badahakim
16	West No. 1	Nuwakot	Militia Goswara	Badahakim
17	West No. 2	Gorkha	Militia Goswara	Badahakim
18	West No. 3	Pokhara (initially Bandipur)	Militia Goswara	Badahakim
19	West No. 4	Syangja	Militia Goswara	Badahakim
20	Palpa	Tansen	Gaunda	Governor (General rank)
21	Pyuthan	Pyuthan	Chhoti Gaunda	Badahakim (Captain rank)
22	Salyan	Salyan	Gaunda	Badahakim (Colonel rank)
23	Dailekh	Dailekh	Gaunda	Badahakim (Colonel rank)
24	Jumla	Jumla	Chhoti Gaunda	Badahakim
25	Doti	Silgadhi	Gaunda	Badahakim (Colonel rank)
26	Baitadi	Baitadi	Chhoti Gaunda	Badahakim
27	Dadeldhura	Dadeldhura	Chhoti Gaunda	Badahakim
28	Pali-Majhkhanda	Bhairahawa (initially Bethari)	Goswara	Badahakim
29	Khajahani-Shivaraj	Taulihawa	Goswara	Badahakim
30	Dang-Deukhuri	Bijauri	Goswara	Badahakim
31	Banke-Bardiya	Nepalgunj	Goswara	Badahakim
32	Kailali-Kanchanpur	Dhangadhi	Goswara	Badahakim

=== Districts from 1951 to 1962 ===
Several changes were brought to district administration after the fall of Rana regime in 1951. Gulmi (Headquarters: Tamghas) and Baglung (Headquarters: Baglung) were separated from Palpa and made into new districts of Gaunda category. Sindhuli was merged with East No. 2 (Ramechhap). Headquarters of Jhapa was moved to Chandragadhi whereas the headquarters of Dang-Deukhuri was moved to Ghorahi.

In 1953, districts were classified into three classes of A, B and C according to population, revenue and importance. In 1954, the positions of Hajuriya General and Brigadier Generals, who governed Kathmandu Valley were abolished and the three subdivisions of Kathmandu Valley were brought under the governance of three magistrates.

In 1956, an Administrative Reorganization Planning Commission (ARPC) was setup for administrative reorganization. It recommended a fresh reorganization of the old districts whose boundaries were "the result of historical factors" and not "efficiency of administration or uniformity of size." It recommended 32 new districts, grouped into seven regions. However, these recommendations were overlooked and the traditional districts (Gaundas, Goswaras and Gadhis) were continued till 1962. (Note: The traditional districts (Gaundas, Goswaras, and Gadhis) were administratively abolished only in 1965 (2022 B.S), when Badahakims were replaced by Chief District Officers (CDOs).)

Districts from 1951 to 1962
Class	Districts	No. of districts
A	Dhankuta • Birgunj • Mahottari-Sarlahi • Saptari • Biratnagar • Palpa • Palhi-Majhkhanda	7
B	East No. 1 • Ilam • Jhapa • West No. 1 • West No. 3 • Doti • Khajahani-Shivaraj • Banke-Bardiya • Kailali-Kanchanpur	9
C	East No. 2 • East No.3 • East No. 4 • Chisapani • Udayapur • West No. 2 • West No. 4 • Baglung • Salyan • Pyuthan • Gulmi • Dailekh • Dadeldhura • Jumla • Baitadi • Dang-Deukhuri	16
Valley magistrates (since 1954)	Kathmandu • Lalitpur • Bhaktapur	3
Total districts		35

=== Panchayat era (1960–1990) ===
In 1961 (2018 B.S), King Mahendra declared that the country would be divided into 14 zones and 75 development districts. A Zone and Development District Division Committee (Nepali: अञ्चल एवं विकास जिल्ला विभाजन समिति) was setup to draw zonal/district boundaries and fix their headquarters. As per the report submitted by the committee, on 20 November 1962 (5 Mangsir 2019 B.S), the Government of Nepal took the decision to divide Nepal into 14 zones and 75 development districts, and it came into effect upon the publication in the Nepal Gazette on 17 December 1962 (2 Poush 2019 B.S) replacing the traditional districts.

In 1975, most districts underwent major boundary changes that shaped Nepal’s present-day districts. Large number of Village Panchayats were shifted across 58 districts. The most significant change was the merger of the former Tibrikot District into Jumla District and the creation of new district Kalikot, carved out of western Jumla. Bhojpur District was moved from Sagarmatha Zone to Koshi Zone, Parbat District from Gandaki Zone to Dhaulagiri Zone, and Dolpa District from Dhaulagiri Zone to Karnali Zone. Despite these changes, the total number of districts remained at 75.

District Panchayat was the district level governing body during the Panchayat System (1962–1990).

Zones and Districts of Nepal (1975-2015)
S.N.	Zone	Districts	No. of Districts
1	Mechi	Taplejung • Panchthar • Ilam • Jhapa	4
2	Koshi	Sankhuwasabha • Tehrathum • Bhojpur • Dhankuta • Morang • Sunsari	6
3	Sagarmatha	Solukhumbu • Khotang • Okhaldhunga • Udayapur • Saptari • Siraha	6
4	Janakpur	Dolakha • Ramechhap • Sindhuli • Dhanusha • Mahottari • Sarlahi	6
5	Bagmati	Rasuwa • Nuwakot • Dhading • Sindhupalchok • Kavrepalanchok • Bhaktapur • Lalitpur • Kathmandu	8
6	Narayani	Makwanpur • Rautahat • Bara • Parsa • Chitwan	5
7	Gandaki	Gorkha • Manang • Lamjung • Kaski • Tanahun • Syangja	6
8	Lumbini	Gulmi • Palpa • Arghakhanchi • Nawalparasi • Rupandehi • Kapilvastu	6
9	Dhaulagiri	Mustang • Myagdi • Baglung • Parbat	4
10	Rapti	Rukum • Rolpa • Pyuthan • Salyan • Dang	5
11	Bheri	Jajarkot • Dailekh • Surkhet • Banke • Bardiya	5
12	Karnali	Dolpa • Mugu • Humla • Jumla • Kalikot	5
13	Seti	Bajura • Bajhang • Achham • Doti • Kailali	5
14	Mahakali	Darchula • Baitadi • Dadeldhura • Kanchanpur	4
Nepal			75

=== District Development Committee (1990–2017) ===
District Development Committee (DDC) was established in 1990, following the end of the Panchayat system. It replaced the previous District Panchayat. It was composed of elected members at the district level. It was responsible for formulating district-level development policies. It was replaced with District Coordination Committee (DCC) in 2017.

Maps of historical Districts of Nepal
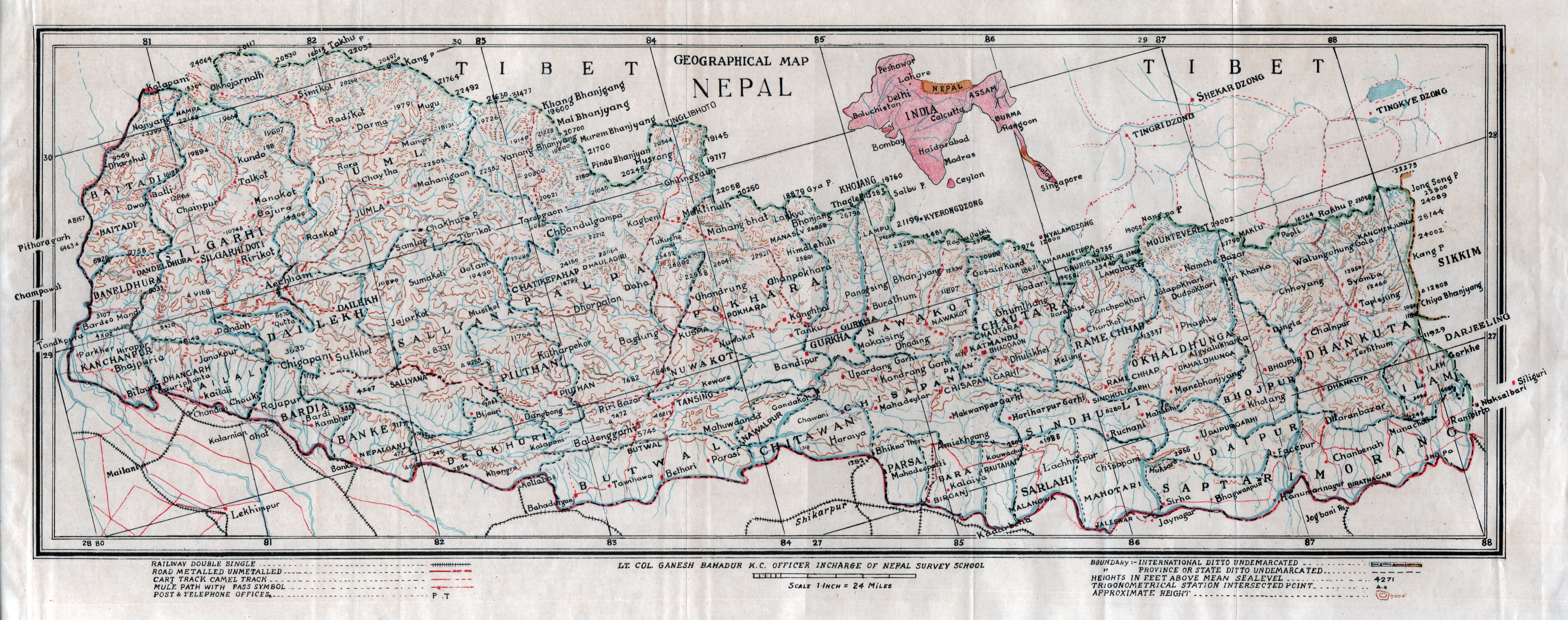
Districts of Nepal in 1942

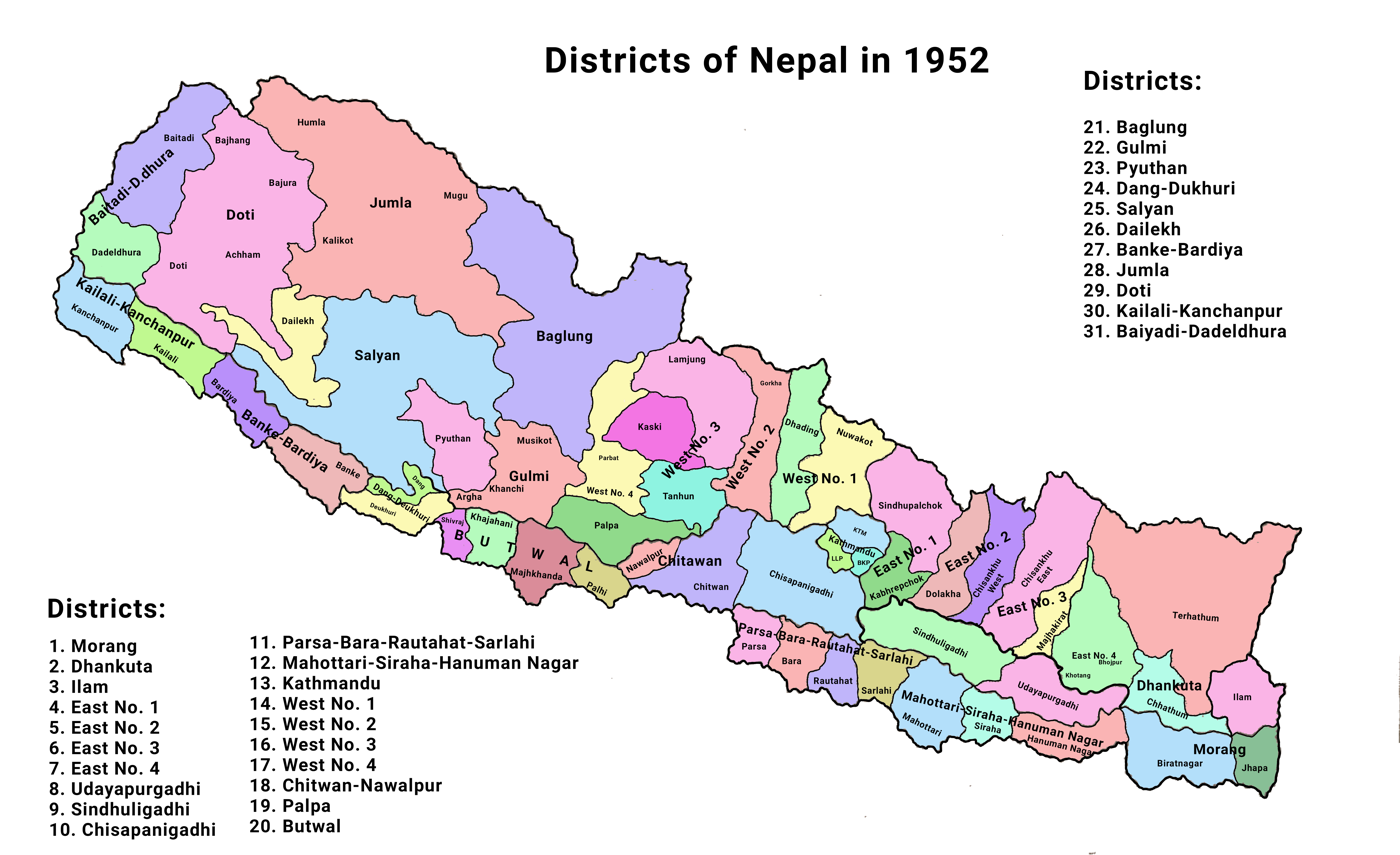
Districts of Nepal in 1952

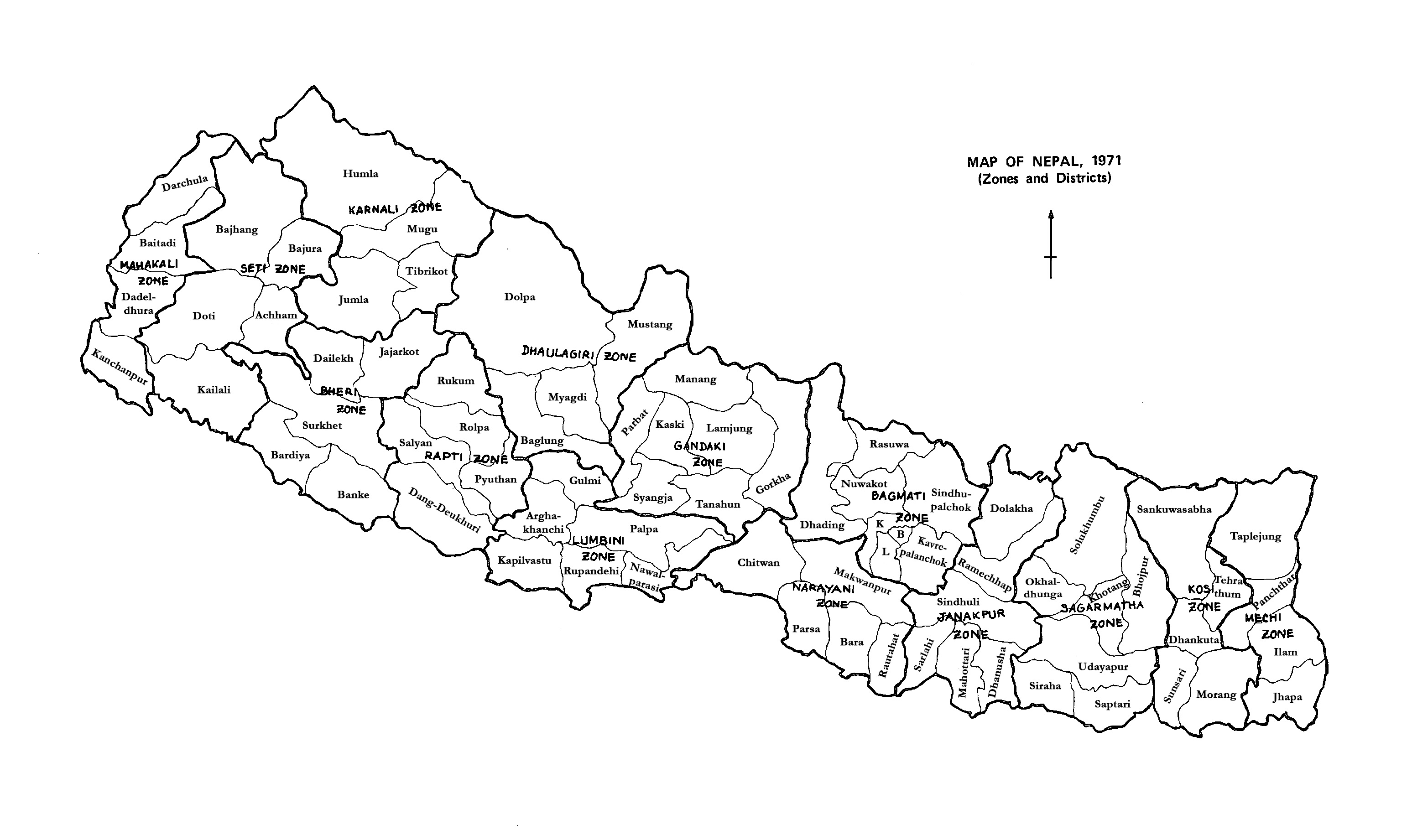
Districts of Nepal in 1971

Districts of Nepal until 2015

Districts of Nepal after 2015

Districts of Nepal in 2020

== Districts under new administration ==
Since 20 September 2015, Nepal is divided into 7 provinces and 77 districts. They are defined by schedule 4 of the new constitution, by grouping together the existing districts. Two districts, Nawalparasi and Rukum, were split in two parts: Parasi District and Nawalpur District, and Eastern Rukum District and Western Rukum District respectively ending up in two different provinces. The old District Development Committee (DDC) was replaced with District Coordination Committee (DCC) in 2017.

Provinces	Capital	Districts	Area (KM^{2})	Population (2021) CBS	Density (people/KM^{2})	Major Languages
Nepal	Kathmandu	77	147,641.28 km^{2}	29,164,578	198.15	Nepali
Koshi Province	Biratnagar	14	25,905 km^{2}	4,961,412	191.52	Nepali/Rai/Limbu/ Rajbanshi
Madhesh Province	Janakpur	8	9,661 km^{2}	6,114,600	632.92	Nepali/Maithili/Bhojpuri
Bagmati Province	Hetauda	13	20,300 km^{2}	6,116,866	301.32	Nepali/Tamang/Nepal Bhasha
Gandaki Province	Pokhara	11	21,504 km^{2}	2,466,427	113.18	Nepali/Gurung/Magar
Lumbini Province	Deukhuri	12	22,288km^{2}	5,122,078	265.79	Nepali/Tharu/Awadhi
Karnali Province	Birendranagar	10	27,984km^{2}	1,688,412	54.97	Nepali/Magar/Tamang
Sudurpashchim Province	Godawari	9	19,999.28 km^{2}	2,694,783	137.92	Nepali/Doteli/Tharu

== List of districts ==
=== Koshi Province ===

Districts of Koshi
Name	Nepali	Headquarters	Area (km^{2})	Population (2021)	Website
Bhojpur District	भोजपुर जिल्ला	Bhojpur	1,507	157,923	
Dhankuta District	धनकुटा जिल्ला	Dhankuta	891	150,599	
Ilam District	इलाम जिल्ला	Ilam	1,703	279,534	
Jhapa District	झापा जिल्ला	Chandragadhi (Bhadrapur)	1,606	998,054	
Khotang District	खोटाङ जिल्ला	Diktel	1,591	175,298	
Morang District	मोरङ जिल्ला	Biratnagar	1,855	1,148,156	
Okhaldhunga District	ओखलढुङ्गा जिल्ला	Okhaldhunga (Siddhicharan)	1,074	139,552	
Panchthar District	पाँचथर जिल्ला	Phidim	1,241	172,400	
Sankhuwasabha District	सङ्खुवासभा जिल्ला	Khandbari	3,480	158,041	
Solukhumbu District	सोलुखुम्बु जिल्ला	Salleri (Solududhkunda)	3,312	104,851	
Sunsari District	सुनसरी जिल्ला	Inaruwa	1,257	926,962	
Taplejung District	ताप्लेजुङ जिल्ला	Phungling	3,646	120,590	
Tehrathum District	तेह्रथुम जिल्ला	Myanglung	679	88,731	
Udayapur District	उदयपुर जिल्ला	Gaighat (Triyuga)	2,063	340,721	
Koshi Pradesh	कोशी प्रदेश	Biratnagar	25,905 km^{2}	4,961,412	

=== Madhesh Province ===

Districts of Madhesh Province
Districts	Nepali	Headquarters	Area (km^{2})	Population (2021)	Official Website
Parsa District	पर्सा जिल्ला	Birgunj	1,353	654,471	
Bara District	बारा जिल्ला	Kalaiya	1,190	763,137	
Rautahat District	रौतहट जिल्ला	Gaur	1,126	813,573	
Sarlahi District	सर्लाही जिल्ला	Malangwa	1,259	862,470	
Dhanusha District	धनुषा जिल्ला	Janakpur	1,180	867,747	
Siraha District	सिराहा जिल्ला	Siraha	1,188	739,953	
Mahottari District	महोत्तरी जिल्ला	Jaleshwar	1,002	706,994	
Saptari District	सप्तरी जिल्ला	Rajbiraj	1,363	706,255	
Madhesh Province	मधेश प्रदेश	Janakpur	9,661 km^{2}	6,114,600	

=== Bagmati Province ===

Districts of Bagmati
Districts	Nepali	Headquarters	Area (km^{2})	Population (2021)	Official Website
Sindhuli District	सिन्धुली जिल्ला	Sindhulimadhi (Kamalamai)	2,491	300,026	
Ramechhap District	रामेछाप जिल्ला	Manthali	1,546	170,302	
Dolakha District	दोलखा जिल्ला	Charikot (Bhimeshwar)	2,191	172,767	
Bhaktapur District	भक्तपुर जिल्ला	Bhaktapur	119	432,132	
Dhading District	धादिङ जिल्ला	Dhading Besi (Nilkantha)	1,926	325,710	
Kathmandu District	काठमाडौँ जिल्ला	Kathmandu	395	2,041,587	
Kavrepalanchok District	काभ्रेपलाञ्चोक जिल्ला	Dhulikhel	1,396	364,039	
Lalitpur District	ललितपुर जिल्ला	Lalitpur	385	551,667	
Nuwakot District	नुवाकोट जिल्ला	Bidur	1,121	263,391	
Rasuwa District	रसुवा जिल्ला	Dhunche	1,544	46,689	
Sindhupalchok District	सिन्धुपाल्चोक जिल्ला	Chautara	2,542	262,624	
Chitwan District	चितवन जिल्ला	Bharatpur	2,218	719,859	
Makwanpur District	मकवानपुर जिल्ला	Hetauda	2,426	466,073	
Bagmati Province	बागमती प्रदेश	Hetauda	20,300 km^{2}	6,116,866	

=== Gandaki Province ===

Districts of Gandaki
Districts	Nepali	Headquarters	Area (km^{2}.)	Population (2021)	Official Website
Baglung District	बागलुङ जिल्ला	Baglung	1,784	249,211	
Gorkha District	गोरखा जिल्ला	Gorkha	3,610	251,027	
Kaski District	कास्की जिल्ला	Pokhara	2,017	600,051	
Lamjung District	लमजुङ जिल्ला	Besisahar	1,692	155,852	
Manang District	मनाङ जिल्ला	Chame	2,246	5,658	
Mustang District	मुस्ताङ जिल्ला	Jomsom	3,573	14,452	
Myagdi District	म्याग्दी जिल्ला	Beni	2,297	107,033	
Nawalpur District	नवलपरासी (बर्दघाट सुस्ता पूर्व) जिल्ला	Kawasoti	1,370	378,079	
Parbat District	पर्वत जिल्ला	Kusma	494	130,887	
Syangja District	स्याङग्जा जिल्ला	Putalibazar	1,164	253,024	
Tanahun District	तनहुँ जिल्ला	Damauli (Vyas)	1,546	321,153	
Gandaki Province	गण्डकी प्रदेश	Pokhara	21,793 km^{2}	2,466,427	

=== Lumbini Province ===

Districts of Lumbini
Districts	Nepali	Headquarters	Area (km^{2}.)	Population (2021)	Official Website
Kapilvastu District	कपिलवस्तु जिल्ला	Taulihawa	1,738	682,961	
Nawalparasi (West of Bardaghat Susta) District	नवलपरासी (बर्दघाट सुस्ता पश्चिम) जिल्ला	Parasi (Ramgram)	792	386,868	
Rupandehi District	रुपन्देही जिल्ला	Bhairahawa (Siddharthanagar)	1,360	1,121,957	
Arghakhanchi District	अर्घाखाँची जिल्ला	Sandhikharka	1,193	177,086	
Gulmi District	गुल्मी जिल्ला	Tamghas (Resunga)	1,149	246,494	
Palpa District	पाल्पा जिल्ला	Tansen	1,373	245,027	
Dang District	दाङ जिल्ला	Ghorahi	2,955	674,993	
Pyuthan District	प्युठान जिल्ला	Pyuthan	1,309	232,019	
Rolpa District	रोल्पा जिल्ला	Liwang (Rolpa)	1,879	224,506	
Eastern Rukum District	पूर्वी रूकुम जिल्ला	Rukumkot	1,161	56,786	
Banke District	बाँके जिल्ला	Nepalganj	2,337	603,194	
Bardiya District	बर्दिया जिल्ला	Gulariya	2,025	459,900	
Lumbini Province	लुम्बिनी प्रदेश	Deukhuri	19,271 km^{2}	5,122,078	

=== Karnali Province ===

Districts of Karnali
Districts	Nepali	Headquarters	Area (km^{2})	Population (2021)	Official Website
Western Rukum District	पश्चिमी रूकुम जिल्ला	Musikot	1,716	166,740	
Salyan District	सल्यान जिल्ला	Salyan (Sharada)	1,462	238,515	
Dolpa District	डोल्पा जिल्ला	Dunai (Thuli Bheri)	7,889	42,774	
Humla District	हुम्ला जिल्ला	Simikot	5,655	55,394	
Jumla District	जुम्ला जिल्ला	Jumla (Chandannath)	2,531	118,349	
Kalikot District	कालिकोट जिल्ला	Manma (Khandachakra)	1,741	145,292	
Mugu District	मुगु जिल्ला	Gamgadhi (Chhyanath Rara)	3,535	64,549	
Surkhet District	सुर्खेत जिल्ला	Birendranagar	2,451	415,126	
Dailekh District	दैलेख जिल्ला	Dailekh (Narayan)	1,502	252,313	
Jajarkot District	जाजरकोट जिल्ला	Jajarkot Khalanga (Bheri)	2,230	189,360	
Karnali Province	कर्णाली प्रदेश	Birendranagar	30,712 km^{2}	1,688,412	

=== Sudurpashchim Province ===

Districts of Sudurpaschim
Districts	Nepali	Headquarters	Area (km^{2})	Population (2021)	Official Website
Kailali District	कैलाली जिल्ला	Dhangadhi	3,235	904,666	
Achham District	अछाम जिल्ला	Mangalsen	1,680	228,852	
Doti District	डोटी जिल्ला	Dipayal Silgadhi	2,025	204,831	
Bajhang District	बझाङ जिल्ला	Chainpur (Jayaprithvi)	3,422	189,085	
Bajura District	बाजुरा जिल्ला	Martadi (Badimalika)	2,188	138,523	
Kanchanpur District	कंचनपुर जिल्ला	Mahendranagar (Bheemdatta)	1,610	513,757	
Dadeldhura District	डडेलधुरा जिल्ला	Dadeldhura (Amargadhi)	1,538	139,602	
Baitadi District	बैतडी जिल्ला	Baitadi Khalanga (Dasharathchand)	1,519	242,157	
Darchula District	दार्चुला जिल्ला	Darchula Khalanga (Mahakali)	2,322	133,310	
Sudurpashchim Province	सुदूर-पश्चिम प्रदेश	Dhangadhi	19,539 km^{2}	2,694,783	

== Geographical classification of districts ==
Following table shows the geographical classification of districts as per the Local Government Operation Act, 2074 B.S (2017 A.D).

Mountain Districts	Hill Districts	Inner Terai Districts	Terai Districts	Kathmandu Valley Districts
1. Taplejung; 2. Sankhuwasabha; 3. Solukhumbu; 4. Dolakha; 5. Sindhupalchok; 6. Rasuwa; 7. Manang; 8. Mustang; 9. Dolpa; 10. Jumla; 11. Mugu; 12. Humla; 13. Kalikot; 14. Bajura; 15. Bajhang; 16. Darchula; 17. Ramechhap (Note: Ramechhap, Dhading, Gorkha and Eastern Rukum were classified as Hill Districts before 2017.); 18. Dhading; 19. Gorkha; 20. Eastern Rukum	1. Panchthar; 2. Ilam; 3. Tehrathum; 4. Dhankuta; 5. Bhojpur; 6. Okhaldhunga; 7. Khotang; 8. Kavrepalanchok; 9. Nuwakot; 10. Lamjung; 11. Tanahun; 12. Kaski; 13. Syangja; 14. Parbat; 15. Myagdi; 16. Baglung; 17. Palpa; 18. Arghakhanchi; 19. Gulmi; 20. Western Rukum; 21. Rolpa; 22. Pyuthan; 23. Salyan; 24. Jajarkot; 25. Dailekh; 26. Doti; 27. Achham; 28. Baitadi; 29. Dadeldhura	1. Udayapur; 2. Sindhuli; 3. Makwanpur; 4. Chitwan; 5. Nawalparasi (East of Bardaghat Susta)/Nawalpur; 6. Dang; 7. Surkhet	1. Jhapa; 2. Morang; 3. Sunsari; 4. Saptari; 5. Siraha; 6. Dhanusha; 7. Mahottari; 8. Sarlahi; 9. Rautahat; 10. Bara; 11. Parsa; 12. Nawalparasi (West of Bardaghat Susta)/Parasi; 13. Rupandehi; 14. Kapilvastu; 15. Banke; 16. Bardiya; 17. Kailali; 18. Kanchanpur	1. Kathmandu; 2. Lalitpur; 3. Bhaktapur

For many purposes like census, districts are classified into only three geographical regions: Mountain, Hill and Terai. In such case, Udayapur, Sindhuli, Makwanpur and Surkhet from Inner Terai, and all districts of Kathmandu Valley are classified as hill districts. The remaining Inner Terai districts of Chitwan, Nawalpur and Dang are classified as Terai districts. The census still counts Ramechhap, Dhading, Gorkha and Eastern Rukum as hill districts.

== See also ==
- Provinces of Nepal
- Development Regions of Nepal (former)
- List of zones of Nepal (former)
- List of village development committees of Nepal (former)
- District Coordination Committee
- List of mayors of municipalities in Nepal
